= La Vereda del Monte =

Backcountry route in California, United States

La Vereda del Monte (Spanish for "The Mountain Trail") was a backcountry route through remote regions of the Diablo Range, one of the California Coast Ranges. La Vereda del Monte was the upper part of La Vereda Caballo, (Spanish for "The Horse Trail"), used by mesteñeros from the early 1840s to drive Alta California horses to Sonora for sale.

From its northern beginning at Point of Timber on the Sacramento River Delta near modern-day Brentwood, the trail traveled south to the Livermore Valley. It passed nearby east of Alisal (now part of Pleasanton, California) up into the mountains on Crane Ridge, then continued south through the San Antonio Valley onto the rugged backcountry divide of the Diablo Range, traversing what is now Henry Coe State Park and crossing Pacheco Pass. It continued southward to a mountain ranch on Cantua Creek where mustangs and stolen horses were gathered by Joaquin Murrieta's horse gang before they drove them down the rest of La Vereda Caballo to Sonora for sale.

At Poso de Chane east of present-day Coalinga, La Vereda del Monte linked to other roads and trails of La Vereda Caballo such as El Camino Viejo, or another across the valley to the east to the Kern River and Kern Lake, then through Old Tejon Pass, south through Southern California across Antelope Valley and east along the foot of north side of the San Gabriel Mountains before crossing to a spot near Rancho Cucamonga. From there the drove went by various routes, depending on available water, to cross the Colorado Desert into Baja California and the crossings of the Colorado River into what was then Sonora (before the Gadsden Purchase), then across the Sonoran Desert on the Camino del Diablo to Caborca and south into Sonora where the horses were sold.

La Vereda del Monte was used by mesteñeros and horse thieves most notably by Joaquin Murrieta's Five Joaquins Gang as a route for driving mustangs and stolen horses from Contra Costa County and the upper Central Valley southward toward Mexico, unobserved by authorities. Murrieta was reportedly killed by California Rangers at the Arroyo de Cantua, after they had found and followed the Vereda to his gathering place there on the trail where he and his gang held and organized their horse herd for the drive to Sonora.

== Stations Along The Route Of La Vereda del Monte ==
- Estación primero, Located in Contra Costa County northwest of Point of Timber on Arroyo del Sur, was the uppermost of the gathering points of mustangs for the drove down the Vereda del Monte to Cantua Creek.
- Estación segundo: Las Tinajas, 37°46′13″N 121°41′40″W, a watering place and corral with a supply of relief saddle horses, and occasional captured mustangs to add to the drove. The location is at large outcrops of Vaqueros Sandstone, called Murrieta Rocks, about a mile northeast of Brushy Peak just within the southern bounds of the Rancho Cañada de los Vaqueros. From the east the outcrop overlooks a spring in an eastern tributary arroyo to the upper Kellogg Creek that flows down from Brushy Peak. The original name Las Tinajas, (The Jars), refers to the waterholes to be found eroded into the sandstone on top of the outcrops.
- Estación tercero: Located along Crane Ridge, at a waterhole in the Arroyo Mocho, in the vicinity of Mud Springs. Fresh saddle horses were stationed here. Between droves the band gathered in horses from the plain beyond Corral Hollow at La Centinela for the next drove. The arroyo was named Mocho after the nickname of the custodian of this and the next station near the source of the arroyo.
- Estación cuarto: Valle de Mocho, 1st overnight stop in what is now known as Blackbird Valley, south of Mount Mocho. Horses captured on the plain to the east opposite Lone Tree, Hospital, Kern and Ingram Canyons were brought here for the drove as well as horses from the lower Santa Clara Valley as far up the east bay side as the Rancho San Antonio (Peralta) and Rancho San Leandro. The Valle de Mocho was named after the man in charge of the station, Avalino Martínez, known by his nickname as "Mocho," (meaning cut off or short) for his diminutive four feet, four inch, stature. The Arroyo Mocho, and the nearby peak, Mount Mocho is also named after him.
- Estación quinto: In Adobe Valley was a brush corral that held captured horses taken near Arroyos del Puerto, Salado Grande and Saladillo and brought up Salado Grande and from near Latta Creek, over the mountains toward Adobe Mountain37°23′17″N 121°23′32″W to Adobe Valley. They were added into the drove in San Antonio Valley along with others held in Isabel Valley. From here the Vereda followed the divide of the Diablo Range, taking the path now taken by County Line Road as far as the Fifield Ranch.
- Estación sexto (alternate): Valle Atravesado, (Crossed Valley),37°11′51″N 121°25′06″W, so named because it lay across the path of the north-south trending Vereda in an east west direction, was an alternative to Valle Hondo as an overnight camp with a brush corral for the drove if it was slowed while driven from Valle de Mocho to Valle Hondo. Valle Atravesado has been subsequently dammed in the 20th century on its south side and is now a reservoir on the upper reach of Mississippi Creek and is now called Mississippi Lake.
- Estación sexto: Valle Hondo (Deep Valley) a former rancheria below the Vereda on North Fork Pacheco Creek, was an overnight camp with a brush corral. Valle Atravesado was the alternative overnight spot if Valle Hondo could not be reached. From either location the drove then added in horses taken from Arroyos Orestimba, Garzas and Mesteño that had been held at either Estación Paraiso or at Mustang Flat. They were added into the drove where the Vereda passed north of Mustang Peak.
- Estación séptimo: Estación Romero, gathered in horses captured opposite Arroyos Quinto, Romero, San Luis Gonzaga and Alamos. This station was a major hangout for the gang, and it had a brush and pole corral for the holding of stolen horses nearby in Bull Heads Canyon that were added into the drove at early daylight.
- Pacheco Pass was where La Vereda crossed over the trail through this pass at the head of Pacheco Creek, to the west of its summit. This trail over the Diablo Range, between the coastal valleys and the San Joaquin Valley, was steep and rugged and not heavily traveled until 1857 when a wagon road with a lesser grade than the old trail was built over it.
- Frenchs Flat a holding corral for horses to be picked up by the droves, here where the Vereda passed, five miles south of Pacheco Pass.
- Estación octavo: Aguaje Caballo Blanco.
- Estación noveno: Valle Quien Sabe, on the Rancho Santa Ana y Quien Sabe. It was a watering place and sometime gathering point for large numbers of horses from the valleys to the west.
- Estación décimo: Aguaje Panochita gathered in horses captured opposite Arroyos Los Banos, Ortigalita, Panochita and Panoche Grande.
- Estación undécimo: Corral Redondo 36°33′23″N 120°50′22″W located a little ways above the mouth of Arroyo de Corral on the Arroyo Panoche Grande at the eastern foot of the trail over Panoche Pass to the west. Corral Redondo was (and still is) a natural, high banked, almost round loop in the arroyo channel that the vaqueros finished enclosing with drag lines, poles and brush. At this station horses were added in that had been taken from the Upper San Benito, Bitterwater and Salinas Valleys. Also a change of horses was kept there at all times.
- Deposito: Rancho de Cantua, on Arroyo Grande (Arroyo de Cantua). The rancho of the Cantua brothers, used to gather and brand and organize the gang's droves of horses. Location of an adobe building, used as a warehouse for the gang.
  - Murrieta Spring a historic spring flowing from the south bank of Cantua Creek, about 100 yards above where El Camino Viejo crossed the Creek in the San Joaquin Valley. The Spring formed a pool in the arroyo where it emerged from the foot of the western mountains southwest of the Rancho de Cantua. This is where Harry Love and his detachment of California Rangers found the gang at the spring and attacked them on July 25, 1853.
- Joaquin Ridge
  - Joaquin Rocks Also known by the name "Tres Piedras" meaning "three rocks". It was a lookout, a meeting place and campsite for the gang and its leaders, and also sometimes the route of droves of horses being sent to Sonora.
  - Joaquin Spring This spring below Joaquin Rocks to the west along Joaquin Ridge was originally known as Valenzuela Spring until about 1950. This original name probably commemorates Joaquin Valenzuela, one of the Joaquins of the Five Joaquins Gang, leader in charge of the Gang's horse trade to Sonora, and one of the men said to have been killed in the battle of the Cantua at Murrieta Spring. The spring, located in a mountainside meadow, would also supply water and grazing for droves of horses.
