= Corral Redondo =

Historical locale in California, US

Coordinates: 36°33′23″N 120°50′22″W

Corral Redondo was a historical locale in San Benito County, California. It was located a little over two miles above the mouth of the Arroyo de Corral (now Griswold Creek) on the Arroyo Panoche Grande at the eastern foot of the trail over Panoche Pass to the west. The site of Corral Redondo is a natural, high banked, almost round loop in the channel of Griswold Creek that mesteñeros turned into a corral by enclosing its open ends with drag lines, poles and brush.

== History ==
During the early 1850s the Corral Redondo was the eleventh station along La Vereda del Monte. At this station, mustangs and horses stolen from the Upper San Benito, Bitterwater and Salinas Valleys were held. In addition, a change of horses was kept there at all times by the Five Joaquins Gang.

== The site today ==
The site today is a private residence on New Idra Road.
