= Murrieta Rocks =

Coordinates: 37°46′13″N 121°41′40″W

Murrieta Rocks originally named Las Tinajas, (The Jars), refers to the waterholes to be found eroded into the Vaqueros Sandstone on top of the outcrop. The location is at a large outcrop of Vaqueros Sandstone, called Murrieta Rocks, about a mile northeast of Brushy Peak just within the southern bounds of the Rancho Cañada de los Vaqueros in California. From the east, the outcrop overlooks a spring in an eastern tributary arroyo to the upper Kellogg Creek that flows down from Brushy Peak.

== History ==
Murrieta Rocks was a station on La Vereda del Monte ("The Mountain Trail") used by mesteñeros and horse thieves, most notably the horse gang of Joaquin Murrieta. It was used as a watering place, a place to hold a supply of relief saddle horses, and occasionally captured mustangs to add to the drove of horses on the route to the south.
