= Joaquin Spring =

Coordinates: 36°18′55″N 120°27′11″W

Joaquin Spring, originally known as Valenzuela Spring, is a spring on Joaquin Ridge in the Diablo Range in Fresno County, California. The spring is located on the southwestern slope of the ridge, about 500 feet below Joaquin Rocks, at an elevation of 3,520 feet (1,070 meters).

== History ==
This spring was originally known as Valenzuela Spring until about 1950. It was subsequently named for Joaquin Murrieta, a Sonoran bandit in California during the California Gold Rush who used this region as a rendezvous and hideout from around 1850 to the time of his alleged death nearby at Murrieta Spring on July 25, 1853. This name change was an error, in that Joaquin Murrieta was only one of the five accused leaders of the Five Joaquins Gang, named Joaquin that could be found there.

The one leader most responsible for the Gang in the vicinity of the spring was Joaquin Valenzuela one of Joaquin Murrieta's cousins. It was he who organized the gathering and drives of the Gangs stolen and wild horses to Sonora from their nearby rancho and hideout on Cantua Creek. Among other uses for Joaquin Rocks, the Valenzuela band of the Gang would post lookouts on the Rocks to observe the valley below and probably got the water for their camp there, at that spring. It may have been the memory and stories told of him among the surviving gang members of Valenzuela's band and mesteñeros that sold their horses to the Gang, who lived and worked long afterward on the ranches of the San Joaquin Valley and in the Diablo Range that gave the spring its original name.
