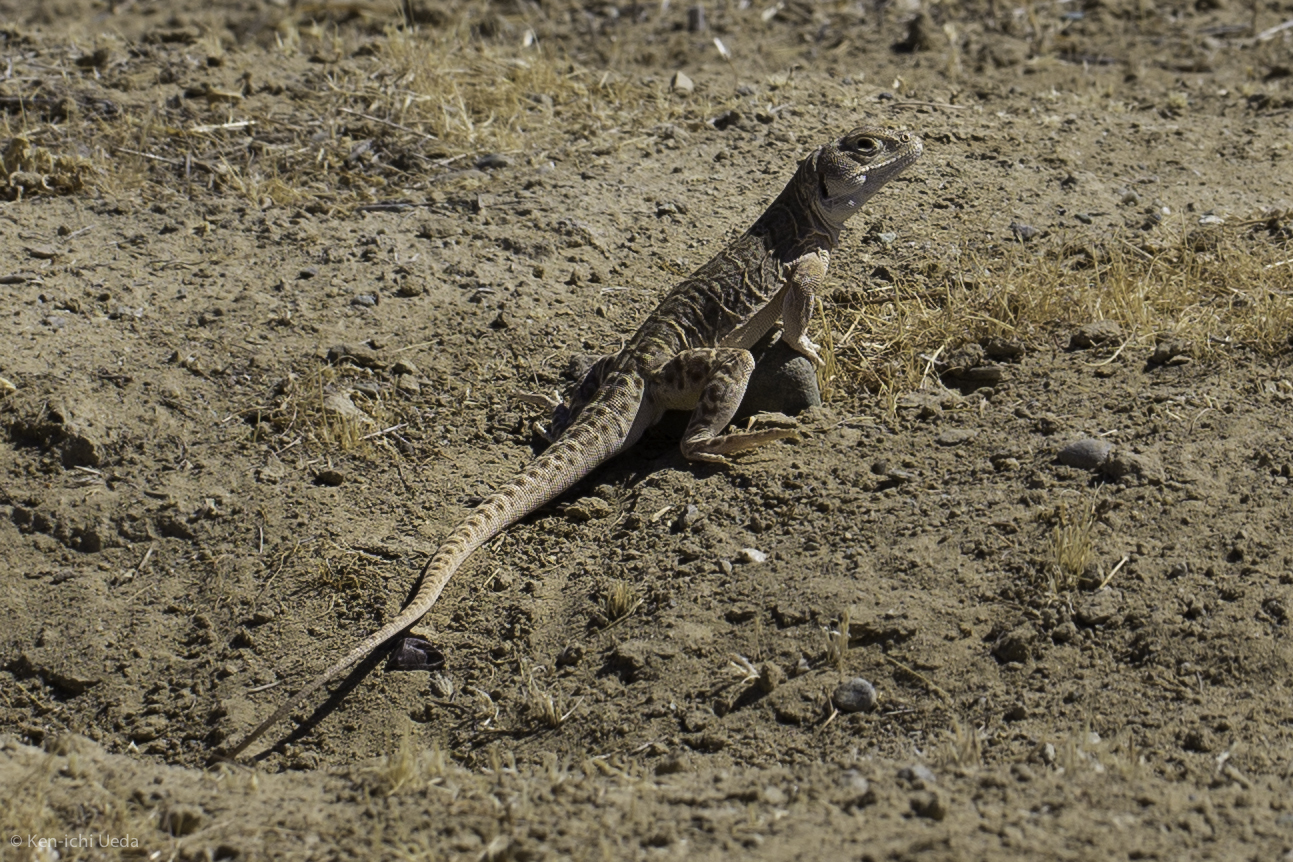

Conservation status
- Endangered (IUCN 3.1)

Scientific classification
- Kingdom: Animalia
- Phylum: Chordata
- Class: Reptilia
- Order: Squamata
- Suborder: Iguania
- Family: Crotaphytidae
- Genus: Gambelia
- Species: G. sila

Binomial name
- Gambelia sila (Stejneger, 1890)

Synonyms
- Crotaphytus silus Stejneger, 1890; Gambelia wislizenii silus — H.M. Smith, 1946; Gambelia silus — Stebbins, 1985; Gambelia sila — Frost & Collins, 1988

= Gambelia sila =

Species of lizard

Gambelia sila, commonly known as the blunt-nosed leopard lizard, is a species of lizard in the family Crotaphytidae. The species is endemic to southern California.

== Taxonomy ==
Gambelia sila was originally described by Leonhard Stejneger in 1890 as Crotaphytus silus. The type locality is Fresno, California. In 1900 Cope believed the lizard to be a subspecies of the long-nosed leopard lizard, C. wislizenii, and classified it as C. w. silus. Based on differences in bony plates on the head, the presence or absence of gular folds, and head shape, Crotaphytus silus was reclassified into the genus Gambelia by H.M. Smith in 1946, retaining the specific name "silus ". Gambelia is the generic name for leopard lizards in the family Crotaphytidae. Gambelia sila is similar to the lizards in the genus Crotaphytus, the difference is that the latter have fracture planes in their tails. This allows the tails to break off when grasped by predators. This reclassification remained controversial until Montanucci in 1970 proposed the argument for specific classification based on the differences between the long-nosed and blunt-nosed leopard lizards. Eventually the scientific name was changed from "Gambelia silus " to "Gambelia sila " to agree in gender.

== Geographic range ==
Gambelia sila is found only in Southern California. It used to be found in the San Joaquin Valley and adjacent foothills ranging from Stanislaus County, in the south, to the northern tip of Santa Barbara County. However, it is only found in elevations of 800 meters (2,600 feet) and below. Gambelia sila can now only be found in isolated sections of undeveloped land in the San Joaquin Valley. In the northern part of the San Joaquin Valley it can be found in the Ciervo Hills, Tumey Hills, Panoche Hills, Anticline Ridge, Pleasant Valley, and the Lone Tree, Sandy Mush Road, Whites Bridge, Horse Pasture, and Kettleman Hills Essential Habitat Areas. In the southern part of the San Joaquin Valley it can be found in Pixley National Wildlife Refuge, Liberty Farm, Allensworth, Kern National Wildlife Refuge, Antelope Plain, Buttonwillow, Elk Hills, Lost Hills, and Tupman Essential Habitat Areas; on the Carrizo and Elkhorn Plains; north of Bakersfield around Poso Creek; in western Kern County in the area around the towns of Maricopa, McKittrick, and Taft; at the Kern Front Oil Field; at the base of the Tehachapi Mountains on the Tejon Ranch; and just west of the California Aqueduct on the Tejon Ranch and Rancho San Emidio.

== Diet ==
The diet of Gambelia sila mainly consists of an assortment of invertebrates and other lizards. The insects that it normally preys on are: grasshoppers, beetles, bees, wasps, and ants. The blunt-nosed leopard lizard is also known to eat other species of lizards, and sometimes eats its own offspring. It is an agile predator, with the ability to leap 60 centimetres (2 feet), making it very easy for it to catch its prey.

== Physical characteristics ==
The blunt-nosed leopard lizard (Gambelia sila) is a relatively large lizard in the family Crotaphytidae. It has a long, regenerative tail; long, powerful hind limbs; and a short, blunt snout. Adult males are slightly larger than females, ranging in size from 3.4 to 4.7 inches (86 to 119 mm) in length, excluding tail. Females are 3.4 to 4.4 inches (86 to 112 mm). Males weigh 1.3 to 1.5 ounces (37 to 43 g), females 0.8 to 1.2 ounces (23 to 34 g). Although the blunt-nosed leopard lizard is darker than other leopard lizards, it exhibits tremendous variation in dorsal color and pattern. The background color ranges from yellowish or light gray-brown to dark brown, depending on the surrounding soil color and vegetation. The underside is uniformly white. It has rows of dark spots across the back, alternating with white, cream-colored or yellow bands. Gambelia sila is relatively unique among crotaphytids in that sexes cannot be distinguished by permanent coloration and patterning, but both males and females develop breeding coloration, and these colors and patterns differ markedly between them. Also, unlike almost all other crotaphytids, juvenile G. sila obtain a yellow coloring under the hind limbs and tails. The signs of yellow coloration in young G. sila might indicate that some type of signal is being sent to adult leopard lizards, although no testing has been done. Possibly the purpose of yellow coloration is to signal to adults that carriers are too small to breed, and, therefore, do not pose a competitive threat. Conversely, the bright yellow coloration of juveniles could serve as a means of avoiding predators.

== Breeding ==
In G. sila the breeding season is initiated in April and lasts into or through June. Male and female pairs are commonly seen together and often occupying the same burrow systems. In June and July, 2-6 eggs averaging 15.6 by 25.8 mm (0.61 by 1.02 in) are laid. Environmental conditions may influence the number of clutches females produce each year, but they usually lay only one clutch. After about a two-month incubation period, the young hatch. They range in size at birth from 42 to 48 mm (1.7 to 1.9 in), excluding tail. Some young blunt-nosed leopard lizards may grow to double their hatching size prior to their first winter. During the breeding season, females are recognized by the bright red-orange markings on the sides of the head and body and the undersides of the thighs and tail. Males may also develop a color of salmon to bright rusty-red over the entire undersides of the body and limbs. This new coloring may continue indefinitely in males. Male and female blunt-nosed leopard lizards exhibit several different physical behaviors. The simple headbob is a single, vertical motion of only the head whereas the pushup involves an up and down movement of the forelimbs and a headbob. Rocking and fighting displays are restricted to males. Rocking involves rotating the head and shoulders in a forward, circular motion. When one male encounters another, it exhibits a threat-challenge display. It consists of inflating the body, extending the hind limbs, arching the back, and performing pushups in rapid succession. Two fighting males will align side by side while facing in opposite directions. Each will then attempt to bite the other as they lash their tails and jump toward each other. Females exhibit a rejection posture when a male attempts copulation. With back arched, body inflated, limbs extended, and mouth open, she always faces the male or moves to orient herself laterally to the male.

== Conservation status ==
Gambelia sila, also known as the blunt-nosed leopard lizard, is listed as a federal endangered species and is listed by the State of California as an endangered species and fully protected species. This species is thought to have declined as a result of habitat destruction and habitat fragmentation caused by development and habitat modification. This lizard used to be found in all of the San Joaquin Valley and the adjacent foothills of southern California. The Blunt-nosed leopard lizard now only occupies a few, scattered, undeveloped plots of land on the floor of the San Joaquin Valley and in the foothills of the Coast Range. San Joaquin Valley is a desert experiencing an ecological shift due to invasive species of non-native annual grasses most likely spread by grazing cows. The blunt-nosed leopard lizard along with other small terrestrial vertebrates are declining due to the ecological changes of the San Joaquin Valley as it is hypothesized that the invasive plants are altering vegetative structure. Although cattle may have originally been a factor in the establishment of these invasive species of plants, it was discovered by David Germano et al. that continued grazing, in order to keep the spread of the grasses limited, allowed for an increase in population size of not only the blunt-nosed leopard lizard, but other suffering species of the Valley as well.

== Sources ==
- Hammerson, G.A. (2007). "Gambelia sila". IUCN Red List of Threatened Species. 2007 e.T40690A10336468. doi:10.2305/IUCN.UK.2007.RLTS.T40690A10336468.en. Listed as Endangered (EN A1ce v2.3)
- "Gambelia sila ". ITIS (Integrated Taxonomic Information System). www.itis.gov. Retrieved on 10-26-2012.
- CSU Stanislaus (2006), Endangered Species Recovery Program, Dept. of Biological Sciences, One University Circle, Turlock, California 95382. http://esrp.csustan.edu/publications/pubhtml.php?doc=sjvrp&file=chapter02K00.html. Retrieved on 10-26-2012.
- Blunt-nosed Leopard Lizard (Gambelia sila). Arkive.com. Wildscreen, n.d. Web. 24 Oct. 2012. .
- Germano, David J. (2007). "Food Habits of the Blunt-Nosed Leopard Lizard". Southwestern Naturalist 52 (2): 318-23. BioOne. 6 Oct. 2010. Web. 24 Oct. 2012.
- Germano DJ, Williams DF (1993). "Recovery of the blunt-nosed leopard lizard: past efforts, present knowledge, and future opportunities". Trans. West. Sec. Wildl. Soc. 28: 38-47.
- Montanucci RR (1965). "Observations on the San Joaquin leopard lizard, Crotaphytus wislizenii silus Stejneger". Herpetologica 21: 270-283.
- Stebbins RC (1985). A Field Guide to Western Reptiles and Amphibians, Second Edition. Boston: Houghton Mifflin Company. 336 pp.
- Tollestrup K (1983). "The social behavior of two species of closely related leopard lizards, Gambelia silus and Gambelia wislizenii ". J. Tierpsychol. 62: 307-320.
- United States Fish and Wildlife Service (1985). Blunt-nosed leopard lizard revised recovery plan. Portland, Oregon: U.S. Fish and Wildlife Service. 85 pp.
