= Point of Timber, California =

Coordinates: 37°54′58″N 121°36′24″W

Point of Timber is a former settlement in Contra Costa County, California, United States. It was located on Indian Slough 2 miles (3.2 km) north of Byron, and about 2.5 miles east of Union Cemetery in Brentwood. It was originally named Point of Timber Landing. The landing was built by Josiah Wills, who organized the deepening of Indian Slough, connecting the landing to the Old River. Point of Timber got its name from the mile wide strip of open Oak woodland that ran from just east of the house of John Marsh along the course of Arroyo del Sur to the edge of the marshes bordering Indian Slough and Old River.

The northern end of La Vereda del Monte, a trail through the backcountry of the Diablo Range to the Central Valley was located at Point of Timber. Joaquin Murrieta and other ranchers and mesteñeros used the trail along Arroyo del Sur to drive mustangs, captured legally in rodeos held on Marsh's Rancho Los Meganos, southward from Contra Costa County. From the time the Five Joaquins Gang was formed stolen horses were fed into the droves of mustangs at its various stations as they were driven down the Vereda.

The community included a general store and a blacksmith shop. A post office operated at Point of Timber Landing from 1869 to 1882, with a closure from 1871 to 1872. Tule fires burned the landing about 1882, but it was rebuilt by 1884.

Author Jack London anchored his yacht, "The Sea Wolf" at the landing while he collaborated with Captain C. W. Lent on a book, "The Seafaring Life of a Captain." London died before the work was finished. The book was never completed. Lent was a sea captain who had retired to Byron and operated a passenger ship between the landing and Stockton.
