= Joaquin Ridge =

Mountain in the American state of California

Joaquin Ridge is a ridge in the Diablo Range in Fresno County, California. The ridge is named for Joaquin Murietta (1830-1853), a California Gold Rush bandit, leader of the Five Joaquins Gang, who used this region as a rendezvous and camp that overlooked the gangs base at the Rancho de Cantua. The ridge is ten miles long, running from its high point at 36°19′48″N 120°34′09″W, east of Spanish Lake, eastward to Joaquin Rocks 36°19′11″N 120°27′32″W, and then southwestward to 36°18′15″N 120°24′11″W near 3,629-foot Black Mountain at 36°18′16″N 120°24′12″W the high point on the south southeast trending Anticline Ridge. Joaquin Ridge is bound on the northeast by the Ragged Valley and the Big Blue Hills and on the southwest by Portuguese Canyon. Its highest elevation is 4,701 feet (1,433 meters), 0.64 km (0.40 mi) east of Spanish Lake.

The most distinguishing feature of Joaquin Ridge is Joaquin Rocks, originally known as "Las Tres Piedras" (The Three Rocks). These three pillars of rock on the ridge are clearly visible on the ridge for many miles from many directions in the San Joaquin Valley and from their summits have a view of much of the valley. On the slope nearby just south of the Rocks at 36°18′55″N 120°27′11″W is Joaquin Spring, that until the 1950s was known as Valenzuela Spring named for Joaquin Valenzuela one of the leaders of the Five Joaquins Gang, and the one responsible for running the gang's trade in stolen and wild horses with Sonora from their hidden ranch on nearby Cantua Creek.
