= San Antonio Valley, California =

Unincorporated community in California, United States

San Antonio Valley
- Unincorporated community
- Location within California Location within the United States
- Coordinates: 37.391709°N 121.490335°W
- Country: United States
- State: California
- County: Santa Clara
- Time zone: UTC-8 (Pacific (PST))
  - Summer (DST): UTC-7 (PDT)
- ZIP code: 94550
- Area code: 408
- GNIS feature ID: 232374

The community of San Antonio Valley, also called San Antonio or San Antone, is located along the Diablo Range in eastern Santa Clara County, California, United States. The locale is bordered by Alameda County to the north and Stanislaus County to the east. The sparsely populated area is located at the junction of San Antonio Valley Road, Mines Road, and Del Puerto Canyon Road. San Antonio Valley Road and Del Puerto Canyon Road are legislatively part of California State Route 130 but have not been adopted by Caltrans.

The area includes the San Antonio Valley Ecological Reserve, a 3,282-acre nature preserve created by a Nature Conservancy purchase of land from local rancher, Keith Hurner, and known for its herd of tule elk.

== History and Variant Names ==
The San Antonio Valley appears to have been a transitional area between the native Ohlone cultures from the San Francisco-Monterey region and the Yokuts of the San Joaquin River watershed. The Ohlone are speculated to have arrived in the Bay Area around 500 A.D. when they displaced Hokan speaking populations already in the region.

On April 5, 1776, the de Anza Expedition called the area El Cañada de San Vicente. The 1956 Thomas Brothers map spells it San Antone. This spelling mimics the way it is pronounced in common, modern usage by locals. It was spelled San Antone on the 1924 "Mount Boardman, California" U.S. Geological Survey 15-minute quadrangle.

La Vereda del Monte traversed the valley on its way between the Sacramento River Delta and the Central Valley and was used by Joaquin Murrieta to transport stolen horses included among legally obtained mustangs taken by mesteñeros in the San Joaquin Valley. San Antonio Valley was one of the places along the Vereda where these horses were picked up from holding places nearby in Adobe Canyon and Isabel Valley.

The U.S. Postal Service established a Deforest Post Office in the area during 1892. It was moved within the area in 1897, 1906, and finally closed in 1909. Another 1924 map calls a group of buildings along San Antonio Creek, Deforest. The name comes from Ransford S. Deforest, the first Postmaster in the community.

== Geography ==
The community lies in the San Antonio Valley at a mean elevation of 2,133 feet (650 m). The valley is traversed by San Antonio Creek, which flows northwesterward to Arroyo Valle, part of the Alameda Creek watershed.

== Community ==
The community includes a CAL FIRE station at 47405 Mines Road. The station is called, Sweetwater - Station 25 and is part of the Santa Clara Ranger Unit, (Firescope mutual aid identifier SCU).

There is a restaurant at the junction of the three roads (Mines, San Antonio Valley, Del Puerto Canyon), appropriately called The Junction Bar and Grill. This restaurant serves as a community center as well as a stopping-off point for the many motorcycles, bicycles, and tourists that travel the roads.

== Telephone ==
The area was served by manual telephone service until deregulation forced the arrival of dial service in the early 1980s. Prior to this, a non-dial Western Electric 1A1 coin telephone served on San Antonio Road about one mile east of Lick Observatory. Its telephone number was San Antonio California Toll Station Number 3. Today, wired telephone numbers for the area follow the format (408) 897-xxxx. The telephone utility serving this area today is Frontier Communications's Citizens Telecommunications Company of California.

== Sources ==
- Santa Clara County Street Atlas, (1956 Edition), George Thomas.

== Books about the area ==
Red Mountain: The Rise and Fall of a Magnesite Mining Empire, 1900-1947 by Robert W. P. Cutler, Morris Publishing, 2001, ISBN 0-9713235-0-X
I Made a Lot of Tracks by Phil Stadtler, CP Media, Bonanza, OR, 2007, ISBN 0-9759841-2-8
