= Cantua Creek =

Cantua Creek may refer to:

- Cantua Creek (Fresno Slough tributary), a creek in California
- Cantua Creek, California, a census-designated place
