= Frenchs Flat =

Coordinates: 37°00′46″N 121°14′10″W

Frenchs Flat is a flat along the divide of the Diablo Range south of Pacheco Pass in Santa Clara County, California. It lies at an elevation of 1,362 feet (415 meters) south southwest of Pacheco Pass.

== History ==
Frenchs Flat was along the route of La Vereda del Monte used by Joaquin Murrieta and his gang to drive their droves of wild and stolen horses through here on their way south to their depot and ranch at Cantua Creek and ultimately to Sonora.
