= Pedro Gonzales (Five Joaquins Gang) =

Pedro Gonzales (? - June 1852), origins unknown, possibly a Sonoran, was killed in July 1852 by Harry Love at what is now the Conejo Grade. He was a known member of the Five Joaquins Gang riding with Joaquin Murrieta's band, as published in newspapers of the time. Another Pedro Gonzales, also a member of the Gang, a Californio that rode with Joaquin Valenzuela, and was killed on July 25, 1853 at the battle of the Arroyo Cantua, was uncovered decades later by the research of Frank F. Latta.

== Pedro Gonzales (Murrieta's band) ==
The Los Angeles Star had noted Pedro's death in an earlier news item noting he had been captured by Harry Love and his partner after tracking him to Mission San Buenaventura. Pedro was shot while fleeing the custody of Harry Love on the Cuesta del Conejo in mid June 1852. Love and his partner had been one of several parties of bounty hunters, hunting the killers of Allen Ruddle for the reward offered by Ruddle's family. The reward was for the apprehension of the killers of their son, who had been killed and robbed on April 27, 1852 by three Mexican men, attacked while driving a wagon on the road to Stockton.

Pedro Gonzales was identified as a member of Joaquin Murrieta's company after his death, by a fellow gang member and Murrieta's brother-in-law Reyes Feliz, in his confession published in the December 4, 1852 Los Angeles Star. In the confession in the trial before his hanging, Reyes confessed to robbing with Murrieta and Gonzales, stealing horses at the Rancho Orestimba, and driving them to the Sinks of Tejon. This was just after the time of Allan Ruddle's murder and robbery, when the gang was under the pressure of the parties and individuals seeking the bounty for his killers. They drover their stolen horses taken from the Rancho Orestimba southward to the Sinks of Tejon. The gang had been followed by a posse led by the Californio owner of the stolen horses and the gang had been captured by the local Yokuts tribe at the Sinks of Tejon and their stolen horses returned to their owner, by their chieftain, Jose Zapatero, a story mentioned in the June 12, 1852 Los Angeles Star. All the gang were subsequently let go by the Yokuts, without clothes or other belongings according to the account of John Rollin Ridge in his Joaquin Murieta, and all but Reyes had then come down to Los Angeles. Reyes himself had been mauled by a bear and took some time to recover before he followed.

In the meantime Pedro Gonzales and an unknown companion had been tracked to the Mission San Buenaventura by Love and his partner. After an exchange of gunshots, they had captured one of the suspects, Pedro Gonzales, while the other, possibly Joaquin Murrieta himself, escaped.

Love and his companion began their return to Los Angeles, herding their captive along on foot while they rode. The Los Angeles Star reported what happened next at the Cuesta del Conejo as given in the affidavit:

The prisoner, being on foot, complained of fatigue and made several ineffectual attempts to escape. When about 8 miles this side of the river he complained of thirst and pointing to a ravine near at hand, told his conductor that there was plenty of water a little way up. Accordingly, Mr. Lull [Love] dismounted and proceeded with the man til they came to a small clump of bushes, when the prisoner darted forward into them and would have made his escape - Mr. L's botas and spurs preventing him from giving chase - but the latter, in endeavoring to knock him down with his pistol, accidently [sic] discharged it and shot him through the head, killing him instantly.

As noted above Pedro Gonzales was later, in December of that year, identified by Reyes Feliz as a member of the company of Joaquin Murietta, and as one of those who robbed persons and stole horses with them.

== Pedro Gonzales (Valenzuela's band) ==
According to the sources of Frank F. Latta, former Five Joaquins Gang members or their descendants, Pedro Gonzales was a Californio whose family lived on the Rancho San Ysidro, at what is now Old Gilroy. According to Latta's sources, he was an excellent vaquero and a lieutenant in the band of Joaquin Valenzuela, involved most of the time in the illegal horse trade to Sonora and said to have been the custodian of the Gang's Las Tres Piedras branding iron. He was said to have gone to Sonora with the last of the years droves that were sent south in late spring. Latta's sources asserted that Pedro Gonzales was one of the men killed at the Arroyo de Cantua July 25, 1853. Unlike Joaquin Valenzuela and Tres Dedos, later buried under a sections of collapsed stream bank by survivors of the gang, Pedro with the rest of the remaining men of the gang killed, were left scattered on the plain for the buzzards, for fear of the return of Love and his Rangers. Juan Mendez and some others of the Gang from Las Juntas later recovered all the bodies and buried them in graves marked by short posts about 100 yards south of the south bank of the Arroyo de Cantua, below the old crossing for the El Camino Viejo.
