= Spanish Lake (Diablo Range) =

Lake in California, United States

- Location within California Location within the United States
- Location: Fresno County, California
- Coordinates: 36°19′51″N 120°34′32″W
- Surface elevation: 4,672 feet (1,424 m)

Spanish Lake is a lake in the Diablo Range, in Fresno County, California. It lies at an elevation of 4,672 feet (1,424 m), 1.6 miles (2.6 km) southeast of Santa Rita Peak at the far western end of Joaquin Ridge.
