= Ragged Valley =

Valley in Fresno County, California, US

Ragged Valley is a valley in the Diablo Range of Fresno County, California, named for the ragged appearance of its surface. It is bound on the east by the Big Blue Hills and on the west by Joaquin Ridge, extending northwesterly from its large mouth at Domengine Creek to the divide between Salt Creek and Cantua Creek where it heads at 36°21′42″N 120°25′25″W.
