= Pedro Gonzales =

Pedro Gonzales may refer to:

- Pedro Gonzales (Five Joaquins Gang), 19th-century bandit in U.S. state of California
- Pedro Gonzales, cartoon character on the UK children's TV show El Nombre

== See also ==
- Pedro Gonzalez (disambiguation)
