= List of cities in Stanislaus County (by population) =

This list includes incorporated cities in Stanislaus County, California as well as census-designated places according to population over 5,000 people listed in the 2010 United States census

1. Modesto - 201,165

Modesto, Spanish for modest, has been an agriculturally active city as well as being the county seat and California's 16th largest city.

2. Turlock - 68,549

Turlock, named after Turlough (a village in County Mayo, Ireland) is home to California State University, Stanislaus.

3. Ceres - 45,417

Ceres is a city full of achievement and unity.

4. Riverbank - 22,678

The Central Valley's City of Action has grown from a small town to a bustling city full of new homes.

5. Oakdale - 20,675

The Cowboy Capital of the World is the largest city in east and north Stanislaus.

6. Patterson - 20,413

Laid out in the Spanish plaza style, Patterson is one of California's fastest growing cities.

7. Salida - 13,722

Spanish for exit, Salida is a community full of excitement and is home to the Town & Country Parade.

8. Newman - 10,224

9. Waterford - 8,456

10. Hughson - 6,640

11. West Modesto - 5,682

12. Keyes - 5,601

13. Bret Harte - 5,152
