= San Benito River =

San Benito River San Juan River
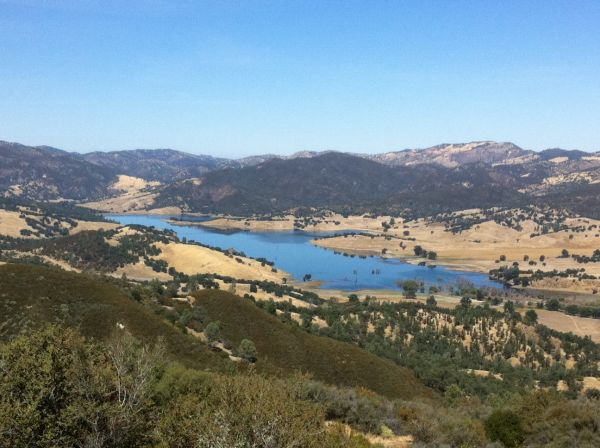
- The San Benito River valley and Hernandez Reservoir

- Mouth of San Benito River

Location
- Country: United States
- State: California
- Region: San Benito County

Physical characteristics
- Source
  - location: southeast of Santa Rita Peak in the Diablo Range.
  - coordinates: 36°19′58″N 120°35′03″W
  - elevation: 4,760 ft (1,450 m)
- Mouth: mouth
  - location: at its confluence with the Pajaro River.
  - coordinates: 36°53′47″N 121°33′46″W
  - elevation: 115 ft (35 m)
- Length: 109 mi (175 km)

The San Benito River is a 109 miles (175 km) long river flowing northwesterly between the Diablo Range and the Gabilan Range, on the Central Coast of California. The river begins in southeasternmost San Benito County, California and ends in the extreme northwestern part of the county, where it is a tributary to the Pajaro River. The San Benito River is longer than the Pajaro River and it drains more area, although it has proportionally lower flows.

== History ==
Father Juan Crespí, in his expedition in 1772, named the river in honor of San Benito (Spanish)/ Saint Benedict (English), the patron saint of monasticism.

== Watershed and Course ==
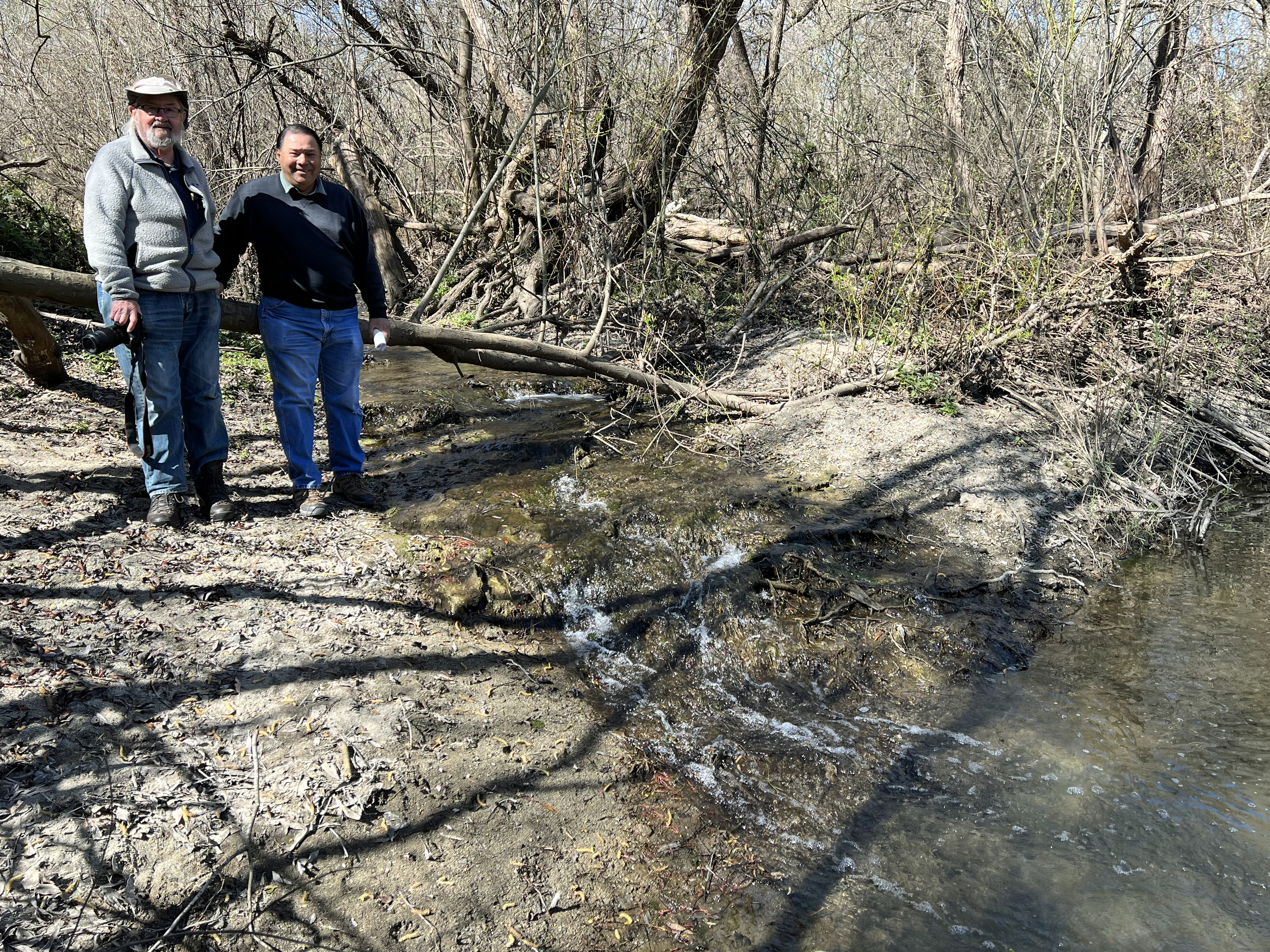
Two individuals stand at the mouth of the San Benito River, where it flows in the Pajaro River.

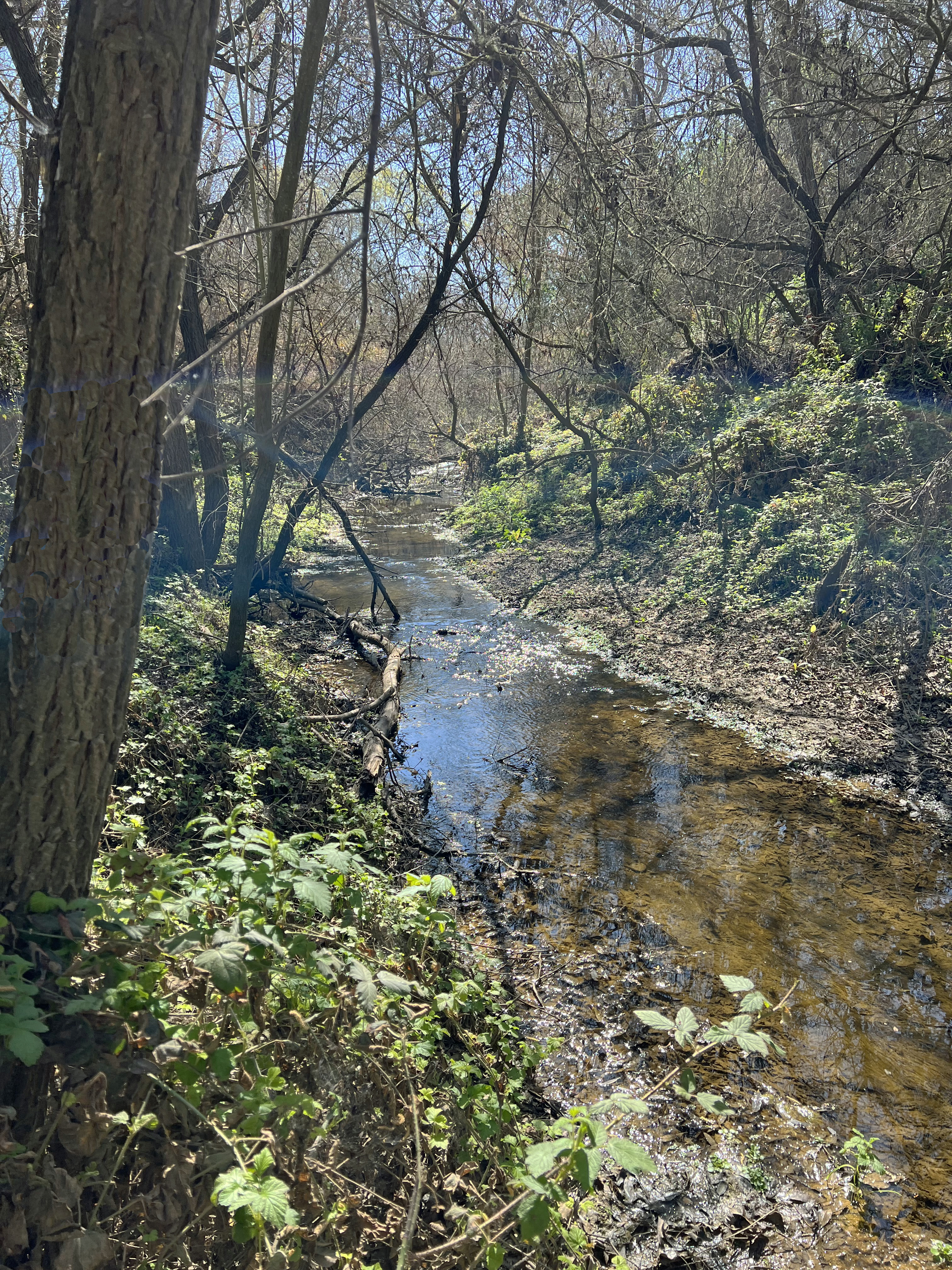
Looking upstream from the mouth of the 109-mile long San Benito River.

The San Benito River drains a 530 square miles (1,400 km^{2}) watershed and flows roughly along the San Andreas Fault between the Gabilan Range to the west and the Diablo Range and south Santa Clara Valley to the east. Its headwaters begin at elevation at 4,760 feet (1,450 m) beginning southeast of Santa Rita Peak in the Diablo Range just south of southern San Benito County in extreme western Fresno County. From there the river crosses quickly northwest to San Benito County and thence to Hernandez Reservoir, formed by a dam built in the early 1960s for irrigation supply and flood control. The lake has a storage capacity of 18,000 acre⋅ft (22,000,000 m^{3}). Below the dam, the streambed is mostly dry during the summer, as the Central Coast receives almost all of its rain during the winter. As the river courses north by northwest it passes through the small communities of San Benito, then Paicines, and then Tres Pinos, before eventually reaching Hollister, California where it turns west into the San Juan Valley and follows the northern hills before turning north to its confluence with the Pajaro River, about 15 miles (24 km) upstream from the latter river's outlet in Monterey Bay. Tres Pinos Creek is its major tributary.

== Geology ==
The surrounding mineral soils come from serpentine which has naturally occurring asbestos. Mining of asbestos, sand, gravel and gypsum has and continues to degrade the watershed. In portions of the river you will find homeless camps, trash, concrete, evidence of mining damage, and the occasional fossil. California's official state gem, Benitoite, was first discovered in the headwaters of the river. The mineral is named after its county of origin, San Benito County.

== Ecology ==
After restoration of trash removal near the mouth of the San Benito River by the conservation group, CHEER, juvenile steelhead trout (Oncorhynchus mykiss) returned, indicating that successful spawning and rearing habitat is now present after a 75-year absence. In a 1940 correspondence, California Department of Fish and Wildlife (CDFW) stated that San Benito Creek "is a good trout stream in its headwaters" with "considerable runs of sea-run steelhead" in some years. However, 1962 CDFW correspondence stated that the "small sporadic run of steelhead" in the San Benito River "has been largely if not completely eliminated by the construction of the Hernandez Project" southeast of the community of San Benito, California.

== See also ==
- Clear Creek (San Benito River)
- List of rivers of California
