= Three Rocks, California =

Three Rocks
- census-designated place
- Location in Fresno County and the state of California

- Location in California
- Coordinates: 36°30′09″N 120°23′30″W
- Country: United States
- State: California
- County: Fresno County

Area
  - Total: 0.749 sq mi (1.941 km^{2})
  - Land: 0.749 sq mi (1.941 km^{2})
  - Water: 0 sq mi (0 km^{2}) 0%
- Elevation: 423 ft (129 m)

Population (2020)
  - Total: 248
  - Density: 331/sq mi (128/km^{2})
- Time zone: UTC-8 (Pacific (PST))
  - Summer (DST): UTC-7 (PDT)
- GNIS feature IDs: 1665672; 2583162

Three Rocks is a census-designated place in Fresno County, California, United States. It lies at an elevation of 423 ft (129 m). As of the 2020 census, Three Rocks had a population of 248.

It was founded by Raymond Minnite of Hiawatha, Utah in 1954. While sitting at the corner of Clarkson Ave and Derrick Ave (HWY 33) counting cars, and dreaming about how many he could make stop, he noticed three large boulders off in the horizon where the Sierra Madre mountain range met the sky, known historically as the Joaquin Rocks, or Las Tres Piedras. This would become the name of the town he founded.

== Demographics ==
Historical population
Census	Pop.	Note	%±
2010	246		—
2020	248		0.8%
U.S. Decennial Census; 2010

Three Rocks first appeared as a census designated place in the 2010 U.S. census.

The 2020 United States census reported that Three Rocks had a population of 248. The population density was 330.7 inhabitants per square mile (127.7/km^{2}). The racial makeup of Three Rocks was 35 (14.1%) White, 0 (0.0%) African American, 7 (2.8%) Native American, 1 (0.4%) Asian, 0 (0.0%) Pacific Islander, 165 (66.5%) from other races, and 40 (16.1%) from two or more races. Hispanic or Latino of any race were 245 persons (98.8%).

The whole population lived in households. There were 63 households, out of which 22 (34.9%) had children under the age of 18 living in them, 34 (54.0%) were married-couple households, 3 (4.8%) were cohabiting couple households, 6 (9.5%) had a female householder with no partner present, and 20 (31.7%) had a male householder with no partner present. 18 households (28.6%) were one person, and 4 (6.3%) were one person aged 65 or older. The average household size was 3.94. There were 41 families (65.1% of all households).

The age distribution was 71 people (28.6%) under the age of 18, 29 people (11.7%) aged 18 to 24, 72 people (29.0%) aged 25 to 44, 61 people (24.6%) aged 45 to 64, and 15 people (6.0%) who were 65 years of age or older. The median age was 35.0 years. For every 100 females, there were 106.7 males.

There were 65 housing units at an average density of 86.7 units per square mile (33.5 units/km^{2}), of which 63 (96.9%) were occupied. Of these, 28 (44.4%) were owner-occupied, and 35 (55.6%) were occupied by renters.

== Education ==
Three Rocks is served by the Golden Plains Unified School District.
