= Clear Creek (San Benito River tributary) =

River in California, United States

Coordinates: 36°21′32″N 120°47′11″W

Clear Creek is a 9.9-mile-long (15.9 km) tributary of the San Benito River in California, in the United States. The creek is the site of Clear Creek Management Area, operated by the BLM, and is known for its mineral abundance. The headwaters area of the creek is the only known location of gem quality benitoite, the designated California State Gem.

In 1998 the creek was identified as containing high levels of mercury in excess of water quality standards. The creek and the surrounding area have ongoing issues with several types of asbestos and other carcinogens. The area is known for having the largest deposit of asbestos in the United States and is designated as a Superfund site.

== See also ==
- List of rivers of California
