= Pedro Gonzalez =

Pedro Gonzalez or Pedro González may refer to:

== Arts and entertainment ==
- Pedro Gonzalez Gonzalez (1925–2006), U.S. character actor
- Pedro González (humorist) (born 1965), Colombian humorist, journalist and actor
- Pedro J. González (1895–1995) Mexican singer-songwriter, activist, and radio host

== Politics ==
- Pedro González de Lara (fl. 1095–1130), Spanish noble and statesman
- Pedro González de Mendoza (1428–1495), Spanish cardinal and statesman
- Pedro González Fernández (1904–1985), Chilean Conservative politician
- Pedro González García (1903–1953), Chilean lawyer and politician
- Pedro González Llamas (fl. 1808–1812), Spanish general in the Peninsular War
- Pedro González Vallejo (1770–1842), Spanish cleric and politician
- Pedro Miguel González Pinzón (born 1965), Panamanian politician, speaker of the National Assembly

== Religion ==
- Pedro Gallego ("Pedro González Pérez") (c. 1197–1267), Spanish scholar and bishop
- Blessed Peter González (1190–1246), Spanish Roman Catholic priest of the mediaeval period

== Miscellaneous ==
- Pedro González Ramos (1935–2023), Puerto Rican academic and educator

== Sports ==
=== Association football ===
- Pedro González (Peruvian footballer) (born 1943), Peruvian football midfielder
- Pedro González (footballer, born 1967), Chilean football forward
- Pedro González (footballer, born 1968), Spanish football left-back
- Pedro González (footballer, born 1970), Argentine football winger

=== Other sports ===
- Pedro González (baseball) (1937–2021), Dominican baseball player
- Pedro González (cyclist) (born 1983), Argentine cyclist

== Places ==
- Pedro González, Panama

== See also ==
- Petrus Gonsalvus (fl. 1537–1617), first recorded case of hypertrichosis
- Pedro Gonzales (disambiguation)
