= Ciervo Hills =

Mountain range in California, US

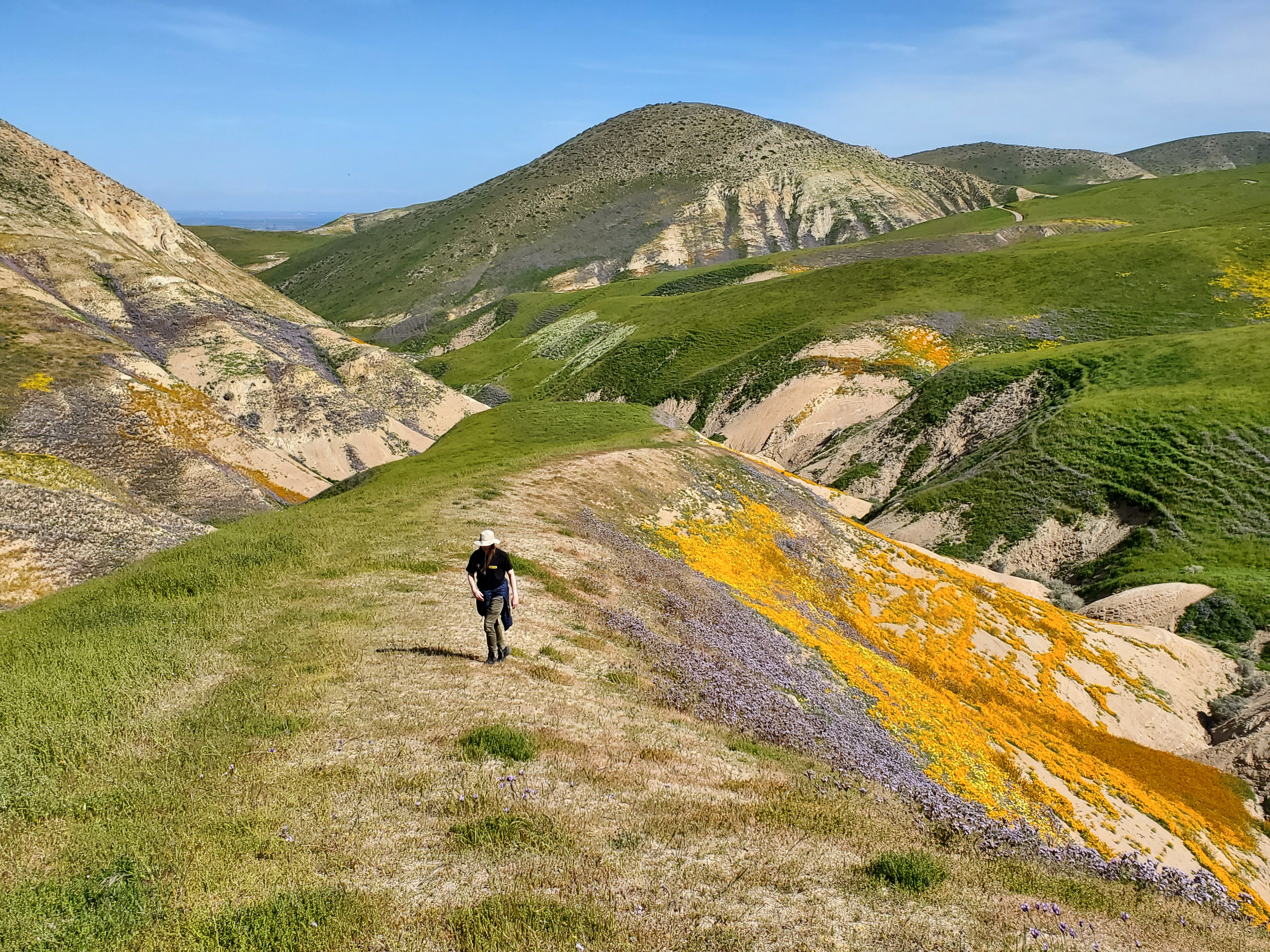

Highest point
- Elevation: 1,027 m (3,369 ft)

Geography
- Location within California
- Country: United States
- State: California
- Region(s): California Coast Ranges, San Joaquin Valley
- District: Fresno County
- Range coordinates: 36°28′23.829″N 120°34′47.602″W
- Topo map: USGS Ciervo Mountain

The Ciervo Hills are a low mountain range in west Fresno County, in the western San Joaquin Valley of central California.

Interstate 5 runs parallel to the hills on the east.

== Geography ==
The Ciervo Hills are in the Southern Inner California Coast Ranges System, adjacent to the Diablo Range on the west, Tumey Hills to the north, and Big Blue Hills to the south. Their highest point is 1,027 metres (3,369 ft) in elevation.

Cantua Creek and its Arroyo de Cantúa canyon divides them from the Big Blue Hills.

== Flora ==
Several California rare plant species are endemic to the Ciervo Hills and bordering Tumey Hills including Panoche peppergrass (Lepidium jaredii ssp. album), Idria buckwheat (Eriogonum vestitum), and gypsum-loving crownscale (Atriplex gypsophila).
