= Brushy Peak Regional Preserve =

Regional park in California, United States

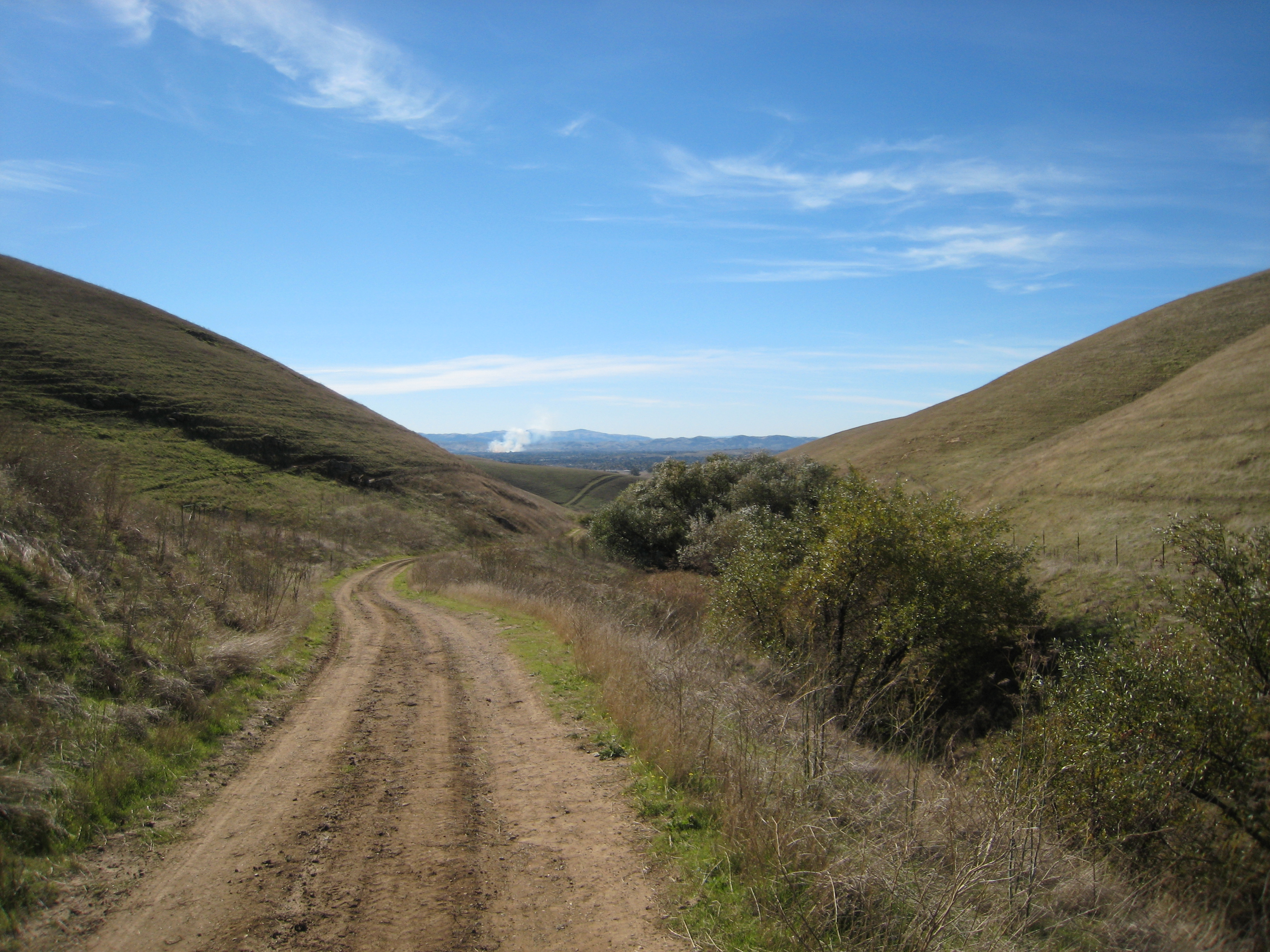
- A view down a trail in Brushy Peak Regional Preserve

- Location within San Francisco Bay Area Location within California
- Nearest city: Livermore, California
- Coordinates: 37.74973°N 121.70832°W
- Area: 1,912 acres (774 ha)
- Operator: East Bay Regional Parks and the Livermore Area Recreation and Park District (LARPD) systems
- Open: Call for times
- Status: Limited access

Brushy Peak Regional Preserve is a regional park that is part of the East Bay Regional Parks (EBRPD) and the Livermore Area Recreation and Park District (LARPD) systems. It is located in unincorporated land in Alameda County, just north of Livermore, California, and is named after Brushy Peak.

== History ==
=== Pre-contact ===
The park is named for Brushy Peak (elevation 1,702 feet (519 m)), a mountain in the Diablo Range, that has had historical significance dating back to Native Americans who lived in the region before the arrival of European settlers. It was a focus of trade routes that connected the Bay Area Ohlones, Bay Miwoks, and Northern Valley Yokuts. According to the EBRPD, "The Ssaoam triblet of the Ohlone peoples was probably the most closely linked to the Brushy Peak area, living in the surrounding dry hills and tiny valleys around the peak and nearby Altamont Pass. Ssaoam populations in the dry summer months may have dispersed and reconverged at various camps throughout the year." Today, access to the top of the mountain is closed to the public to protect grounds that were sacred to ancient Native American tribes.

=== European settlement ===
The first European to make an expedition into this part of California was Pedro Fages, who passed through the Livermore Valley in 1772, on his return from Monterey. Mission San Jose (in present-day Fremont) was founded in 1797, and the Ssaoams lived there from 1806 to 1836. As mission lands were converted into ranchos by the Mexican government, some of the people left Mission San Jose to work as laborers on the new ranchos. The land was probably grazing land for cattle from Rancho Cañada Los Vaqueros.

During the California gold rush, Brushy Peak became a hideout for bandits, most notably Joaquin Murietta (1829 - 1853). By the 1870s, the land around the peak was becoming increasingly occupied by immigrants from the east, and less hospitable to the outlaws. In 1900 and 1901, the Bohemian Club of San Francisco held outings on the top of the peak.

=== Modern ===
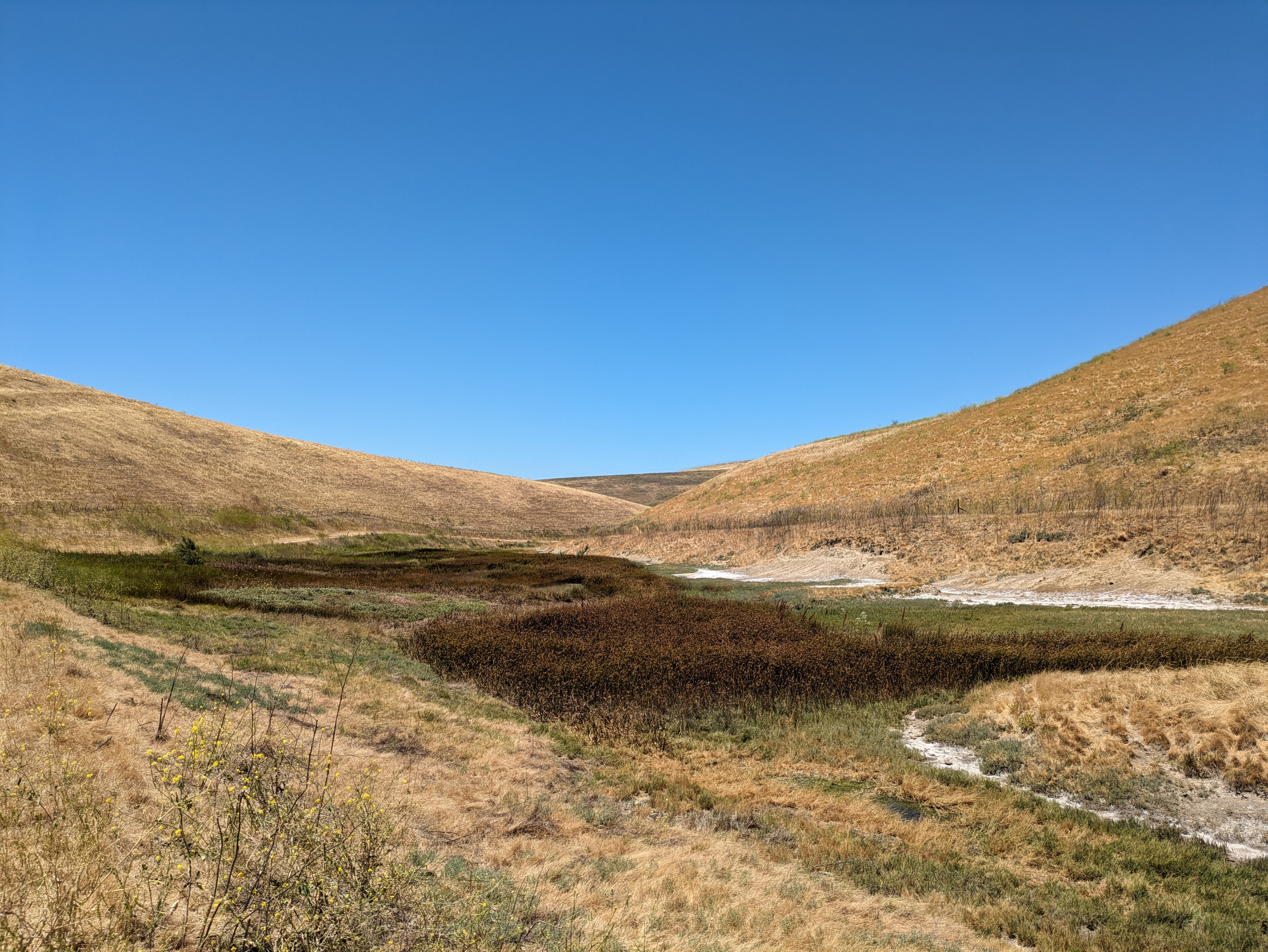
Brushy Peak Regional Preserve

The Livermore Area Recreation and Park District (LARPD) identified Brushy Peak as a potential city park in the early 1970s, and acquired 507 acres (205 ha) for that purpose in 1974. In 1997, LARPD and the East Bay Regional Park District (EBRPD) formally agreed to cooperate in the further acquisition, planning, and protection of Brushy Peak Regional Preserve.

On April 3, 2014, two conservation groups, Center for Biological Diversity and the Alameda Creek Alliance, announced the acquisition of a 79 acres (32 ha) land parcel known as "Eddie's Flat", adjacent to the western boundary of Brushy Peak Regional Preserve.

== See also ==
- "East Bay Wild!" Word Press. 2017. Accessed December 26, 2017. Photographs and text describing Brushy Peak Regional Park Preserve.
