= Adobe Canyon (Del Puerto Creek tributary) =

Adobe Canyon is a valley and tributary stream of Del Puerto Creek in Stanislaus County, California.

The mouth of Adobe Canyon is at its confluence with Del Puerto Canyon and Del Puerto Creek at an elevation of 1,319 feet (402 meters). The head of the valley and source of the stream is at 37°23′45″N 121°19′22″W at an elevation of 2,250 feet (690 meters) near the headwaters of Latta Creek.
