= Patterson, California =

City in California, United States

- City
- Nickname: Apricot Capital of the World
- Interactive map of Patterson, California
- Location within California Location within the United States Location within North America
- Coordinates: 37°28′23″N 121°7′58″W
- Country: United States
- State: California
- County: Stanislaus
- Region: Central Valley
- CSA: San Jose-San Francisco-Oakland
- Metro: Modesto
- Incorporated: December 22, 1919

Government
  - Type: Mayor–council
  - Body: Patterson City Council
  - Mayor: Michael Clauzel

Area
  - City: 7.873 sq mi (20.39 km^{2})
  - Land: 7.787 sq mi (20.17 km^{2})
  - Water: 0.086 sq mi (0.22 km^{2})
- Elevation: 115 ft (35 m)
- Highest elevation: 171 ft (52 m)
- Lowest elevation: 102 ft (31 m)

Population (2020)
  - City: 23,781
  - Rank: 6th in Stanislaus County
  - Density: 3,054/sq mi (1,179/km^{2})
  - Metro: 550,081 (102nd)
  - CSA: 9,665,000 (5th)
- Demonym: Pattersonite
- Time zone: UTC−08:00 (Pacific Time Zone)
  - Summer (DST): UTC−07:00 (Pacific Daylight Time)
- ZIP Code: 95363
- Area code: 209
- FIPS code: 06-56112
- GNIS feature IDs: 277574, 2411383
- Website: www.pattersonca.gov

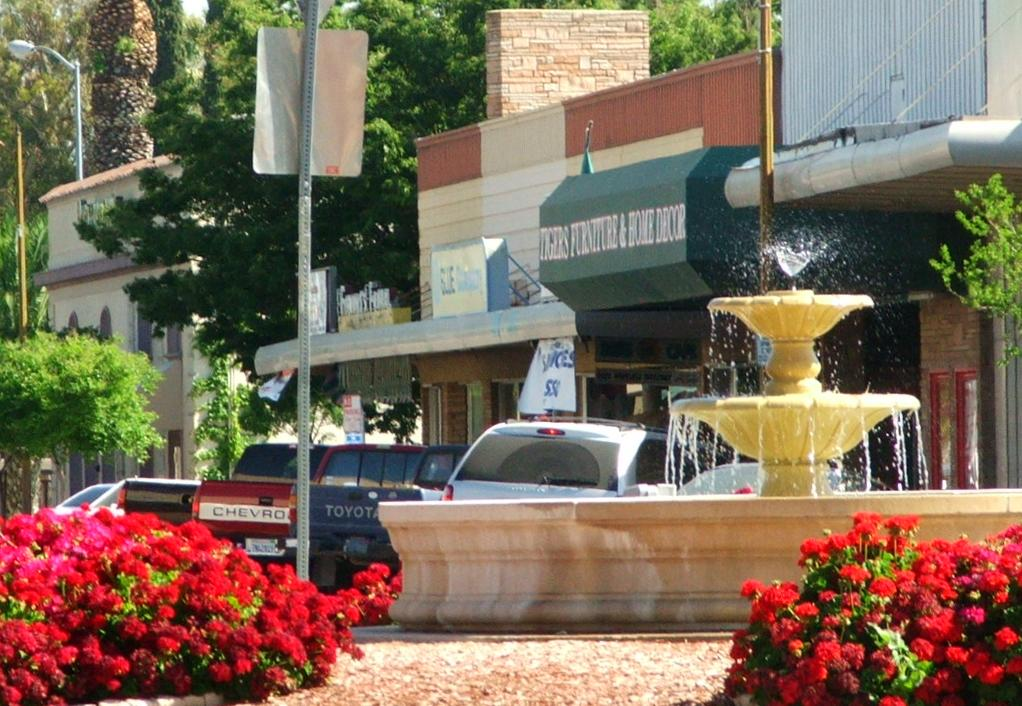
A fountain in one of Patterson's many roundabouts

Patterson is a city in Stanislaus County, California, United States, located off Interstate 5. It is 27 miles (43 km) southeast of Tracy and is part of the Modesto metropolitan area. Patterson is known as the "Apricot Capital of the World" and holds an annual Apricot Fiesta to celebrate with many drinks, food, desserts and games. The population was 23,781 at the 2020 Census.

== History ==
The Rancho Del Puerto Mexican land grant (1844) by Governor Manuel Micheltorena extended east of the present-day Highway 33 to the San Joaquin River. The northern boundary was Del Puerto Creek, and the southern boundary was just south of present-day Marshall Road. This early land grant marked the beginning of the area that would eventually become modern-day Patterson.

Samuel G. Reed and Ruben S. Wade claimed the land on January 7, 1855. A patent encompassing the land grant was signed by President Abraham Lincoln, confirming their ownership. Reed and Wade received title to 13,340 acres (54 km^{2}) on August 15, 1864. Reed and Wade then sold the grant to J. O. Eldredge on June 18, 1866, for $5,000. Mr. Eldredge held the title for only two months before selling it to John D. Patterson on August 14, 1866, for $5,400. John D. Patterson purchased additional land that expanded the property upon his death on March 7, 1902, a total of 18,462 acres (75 km^{2}) were willed to Thomas W. Patterson and William W. Patterson, his estate executors, and other heirs. The land was sold to the Patterson Ranch Company on May 16, 1908, for $540,000 cash gold coin. Thomas W. Patterson subdivided the land into ranches of various sizes and plotted the design of the town of Patterson. Determined to make Patterson different from most rural towns, he modeled Patterson after the cities of Washington, D.C., and Paris, France, using a series of circles and radiating streets. Major streets were planted with palm, eucalyptus, and sycamore trees.

The Patterson Colony map was filed with the Stanislaus County Recorder's office on December 13, 1909. Sales of the ranch properties and city lots commenced. Patterson was the third city in Stanislaus County to incorporate on December 22, 1919. In May 1971, the chamber of commerce approved the title of "Apricot Capital of the World" for Patterson, highlighting the identity.

In recent years, Patterson has become known for its distribution centers, including for Amazon.com and RH.

== Geography ==
According to the United States Census Bureau, the city has a total area of 7.9 square miles (20 km^{2}), of which 98.9% is land and 1.1% is water. The city is located 17 miles (27 km) southwest of Modesto, and 78 miles (126 km) southeast of Oakland making it close to the San Francisco Bay Area and major cities.

Two creeks run through Patterson, Del Puerto Creek crosses the northwest portion of the city, and Salado Creek crosses the center of town, both heading towards the San Joaquin River.

== Demographics ==
Historical population
Census	Pop.	Note	%±
1920	694		—
1930	905		30.4%
1940	1,109		22.5%
1950	1,343		21.1%
1960	2,246		67.2%
1970	3,147		40.1%
1980	3,908		24.2%
1990	8,626		120.7%
2000	11,606		34.5%
2010	20,413		75.9%
2020	23,781		16.5%
U.S. Decennial Census

=== 2020 census ===
As of the 2020 census, Patterson had a population of 23,781. The population density was 3,053.9 inhabitants per square mile (1,179.1/km^{2}).

The median age was 33.7 years. 28.9% of residents were under the age of 18, 10.5% were aged 18 to 24, 27.1% were aged 25 to 44, 22.9% were aged 45 to 64, and 10.7% were 65 years of age or older. For every 100 females, there were 99.0 males, and for every 100 females age 18 and over there were 97.3 males age 18 and over.

99.8% of the population lived in households, and no one was institutionalized. There were 6,461 households, of which 51.4% had children under the age of 18 living in them. Of all households, 58.6% were married-couple households, 7.2% were cohabiting-couple households, 13.9% were households with a male householder and no spouse or partner present, and 20.3% were households with a female householder and no spouse or partner present. About 12.1% of all households were made up of individuals and 5.0% had someone living alone who was 65 years of age or older. The average household size was 3.67. There were 5,395 families (83.5% of all households).

There were 6,685 housing units at an average density of 858.5 units per square mile (331.5 units/km^{2}). Of these, 6,461 (96.6%) were occupied. Of occupied housing units, 67.8% were owner-occupied and 32.2% were renter-occupied. Overall, 3.4% of housing units were vacant. The homeowner vacancy rate was 1.5% and the rental vacancy rate was 2.7%.

99.2% of residents lived in urban areas, while 0.8% lived in rural areas.

Racial composition as of the 2020 census
Race	Number	Percent
White	6,970	29.3%
Black or African American	1,685	7.1%
American Indian and Alaska Native	544	2.3%
Asian	1,550	6.5%
Native Hawaiian and Other Pacific Islander	331	1.4%
Some other race	8,870	37.3%
Two or more races	3,831	16.1%
Hispanic or Latino (of any race)	14,961	62.9%

=== 2023 ACS estimates ===
In 2023, the US Census Bureau estimated that 21.1% of the population was foreign-born. Of all people aged 5 or older, 43.9% spoke only English at home, 48.7% spoke Spanish, 2.2% spoke other Indo-European languages, 4.2% spoke Asian or Pacific Islander languages, and 1.1% spoke other languages. Of those aged 25 or older, 74.7% were high school graduates and 14.2% had a bachelor's degree.

The median household income in 2023 was $93,542, and the per capita income was $29,365. About 7.8% of families and 8.5% of the population were below the poverty line.

=== 2010 census ===
The 2010 United States census reported that Patterson had a population of 20,413. The population density was 3,428.5 inhabitants per square mile (1,323.8/km^{2}). The racial makeup of Patterson was 10,117 (49.6%) White, 1,291 (6.3%) African American, 221 (1.1%) Native American, 1,069 (5.2%) Asian, 280 (1.4%) Pacific Islander, 6,235 (30.5%) from other races, and 1,200 (5.9%) from two or more races. Hispanic or Latino of any race were 11,971 persons (58.6%).

The Census reported that 20,410 people (100% of the population) lived in households, 3 (0%) lived in non-institutionalized group quarters, and 0 (0%) were institutionalized.

There were 5,630 households, out of which 3,162 (56.2%) had children under the age of 18 living in them, 3,398 (60.4%) were opposite-sex married couples living together, 758 (13.5%) had a female householder with no husband present, 491 (8.7%) had a male householder with no wife present. There were 453 (8.0%) unmarried opposite-sex partnerships, and 47 (0.8%) same-sex married couples or partnerships. 716 households (12.7%) were made up of individuals, and 273 (4.8%) had someone living alone who was 65 years of age or older. The average household size was 3.63. There were 4,647 families (82.5% of all households); the average family size was 3.95.

The population was spread out, with 6,890 people (33.8%) under the age of 18, 2,140 people (10.5%) aged 18 to 24, 5,822 people (28.5%) aged 25 to 44, 4,280 people (21.0%) aged 45 to 64, and 1,281 people (6.3%) who were 65 years of age or older. The median age was 29.1 years. For every 100 females, there were 101.1 males. For every 100 females age 18 and over, there were 98.0 males.

There were 6,328 housing units at an average density of 1,062.8 units per square mile (410.3 units/km^{2}), of which 3,801 (67.5%) were owner-occupied, and 1,829 (32.5%) were occupied by renters. The homeowner vacancy rate was 4.5%; the rental vacancy rate was 5.7%. 13,304 people (65.2% of the population) lived in owner-occupied housing units, and 7,106 people (34.8%) lived in rental housing units.

== Government ==
=== State and national ===
In the California State Legislature, Patterson is in the 4th senatorial district, represented by Republican Marie Alvarado-Gil, and the 22nd Assembly district, represented by Republican Juan Alanis. In the United States House of Representatives, Patterson is in California's 13th congressional district, represented by Democrat Adam Gray.

=== Local ===
The city council consists of five representatives. The mayor is elected to a two-year term, and four council members are elected in district elections to four-year terms on a staggered basis; this means that every two years, there are two council seats and the mayor's seat up for election. The current council consists of Mayor Michael Clauzel and Council members Shivaughn Alves (District A), Jessica Romero (District B), Dominic Farinha (District C), and Carlos Roque (District D). The City Council appoints a city manager, who hires all city staff and manages the day-to-day business of the city. Advisory bodies work with the city council and identify issues before the council makes final decisions. Advisory body members are appointed by the mayor, subject to the approval of a majority of the council.

=== Public safety ===
Patterson previously had a local police department. In 1998, it was merged into the Stanislaus County Sheriff's Department. The county sheriff's department, through a contract with the city, provides services through Patterson Police Services.

== Culture ==
=== Media ===
The daily newspaper in Patterson is the Patterson Irrigator, which was founded in 1911. It is located in downtown Patterson and has been at the same location since 1929. The Irrigator, since 2009, is published weekly.

Patterson is also the city of license for two radio stations, the iHeartRadio-affiliated country music channel KOSO and Spanish contemporary hit radio channel KTSE-FM.

=== Celebrations ===
During the first weekend in June, Downtown Patterson hosts the town's largest celebration of the year, the Apricot Fiesta.Patterson is known as the “Apricot Capital of the World”, celebrates its strong agricultural history through its annual fiesta held every June. In 1971, the first year of the fiesta, the Chamber of Commerce agreed to decree that Patterson was the Apricot Capital of the World. It may have been the “capital” at the time, with California growing 95 percent of the nation’s apricots and the United States leading the world in production of the delicate fruit. The event begins on Friday with several beauty pageants, which have become a local tradition. The Patterson Library hosts an art show during the celebration, and displays on local history are held open to the public at the Patterson Museum, also known as the Center Building, located at the center of Patterson. The three-day celebration also features fireworks shows and typically takes place on the first weekend of June.

Patterson has also been the site of the Fiestas Patrias celebration, commemorating the independence of various Latin American countries. This celebration is held in mid-September.

== Education ==
The Patterson Joint Unified School District serves more than 5,669 students and operates four elementary schools, one middle school, and two high schools.

== Transportation ==
Major highways include Interstate 5 and State Route 33. Patterson is also the eastern terminus of State Route 130 as defined by state legislation, although the route is unbuilt in Stanislaus County. A freeway has been proposed for construction along this route, passing directly through the Diablo Range west of the city toward the San Francisco Bay Area.

Public transit service is operated by the Stanislaus Regional Transit Authority, including commuter service to Dublin/Pleasanton station.

== Notable people ==
- Eslabón Armado, band
- Amy Franceschini, artist
- Danielle Hansen, Paralympic rower
- Pedro Tovar, singer
