= Mud Springs (Arroyo Mocho) =

Coordinates: 37°36′18″N 121°39′51″W

Mud Springs, is a spring on Crane Ridge located just above the Arroyo Mocho in Alameda County, California. Elevation of the spring is 1,427 feet (435 meters).
