= Salado Creek (California) =

- Native name: Arroyo Salado Grande (Spanish)

Location
- Country: United States
- State: California
- Region: Stanislaus County

Physical characteristics
- Source
  - coordinates: 37°23′19″N 121°19′23″W
  - elevation: 2,560 ft (780 m)
- Mouth: mouth
  - location: in Stanislaus County
  - coordinates: 37°29′27″N 121°07′30″W
  - elevation: 82 ft (25 m)

Basin features
- River system: San Joaquin River

Salado Creek, originally Arroyo Salado Grande (Big Salt Creek) is a tributary of the San Joaquin River draining eastern slopes of part of the Diablo Range within the Central Valley of California, United States. The Creek ends before it reaches the San Joaquin River, north of Patterson in Stanislaus County.

== History ==
Arroyo de La Puerta was a watering place on El Camino Viejoin the San Joaquin Valley and provided water for Rancho Del Puerto.

== See also ==
- Salado Creek AVA
- Latta Creek
