= Santa Rita Peak =

Mountain in California, United States

- Location within California

Highest point
- Elevation: 5,165 ft (1,574 m) NGVD 29
- Coordinates: 36°20′48″N 120°36′06″W

Geography
- Location: San Benito County, California, U.S.
- Parent range: Diablo Range
- Topo map: USGS Santa Rita Peak

Santa Rita Peak is a mountain located in the Diablo Range of California in San Benito County, a short distance to the west of the Fresno County line and 3 miles (5 km) southeast of San Benito Mountain. Cantua Creek has its source on its northern slope. The San Benito River has its source on its southeastern slopes.
