= Rancho Del Puerto =

1844 Mexican land grant in California

Coordinates: 37.480°N 121.070°W

Rancho Del Puerto was a 13,340-acre (54.0 km^{2}) Mexican land grant in present-day Stanislaus County, California given in 1844 by Governor Manuel Micheltorena to Mariano and Pedro Hernández. The grant extended east of the present-day Highway 33 to the San Joaquin River. The northern boundary was Del Puerto Creek and the southern boundary was just south of Marshall Road, and encompassed present-day Patterson.

== History ==
Brothers Mariano and Pedro Hernandez received the 3 square league Rancho Del Puerto in 1844. Samuel G. Reed and Ruben S. Wade acquired the property.

With the cession of California to the United States following the Mexican-American War, the 1848 Treaty of Guadalupe Hidalgo provided that the land grants would be honored. As required by the Land Act of 1851, a claim for Rancho Del Puerto was filed with the Public Land Commission in 1853, and the grant was patented to Samuel G. Reed and Ruben S. Wade in 1864.

Reed and Wade sold Rancho Del Puerto to J.O. Eldredge in 1866. Two months later, he sold it to John D. Patterson. John D. Patterson (1816–1902) came to California in 1854 bringing with him Rambouillet French merino sheep. Patterson bought more land and owned three ranches in California including 6,000 acres (24.3 km^{2}) of Rancho El Rio de Santa Clara o la Colonia near Oxnard. Patterson married Caroline L. Gage (1826–) in 1866. Patterson returned to Woodstock with his wife and his brother in 1890, to run the Patterson Works, a family farm implement firm. When Patterson died in 1902, a total of acres 18,462 acres (74.7 km^{2}) was willed to nephews Thomas W. Patterson and William W. Patterson, executors of his estate, and other heirs. Two of the heirs, Thomas W. Patterson and John D. Patterson bought out the other heirs and incorporated the Patterson Ranch Company on May 16, 1908.
