= Indian Slough (Old River tributary) =

River in California, United States

Indian Slough is a slough, tributary to the Old River, an old channel of the San Joaquin River in California. Its mouth is at an elevation of 7 feet (2.1 meters), at its confluence with the Old River. Its source is at its confluence with Kellogg Creek at an elevation of 7 feet (2.1 meters) at the location 37°54′58″N 121°36′18″W.
