= Adobe Mountain =

Mountain in Stanislaus County, California, U.S.

Highest point
- Elevation: 3,207 ft (977 m)
- Coordinates: 37°23′17″N 121°23′32″W

Geography
- Location: California, United States
- Parent range: Diablo Range

Adobe Mountain is a peak with an elevation of 3,207 feet (977 meters) in the Diablo Range in Stanislaus County, California.
