= Castle Rock (Corral Hollow) =

Pillar in Corral Hollow, San Joaquin County, California

Coordinates: 37°38′14″N 121°29′25″W

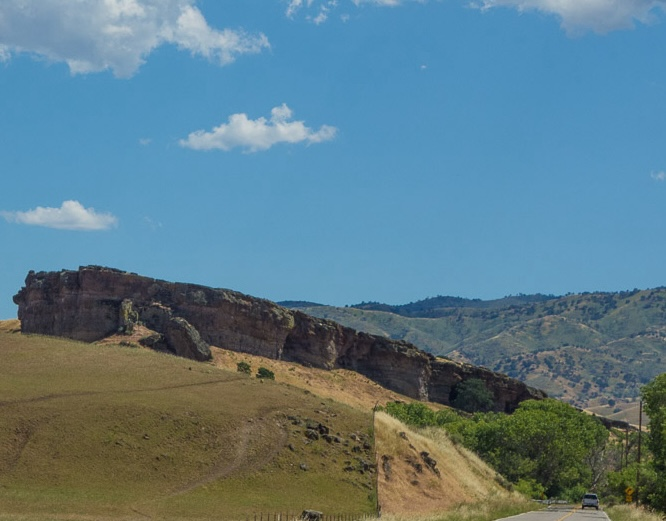
Castle Rock, off Corral Hollow Road

Castle Rock, originally known as La Centinela (The Sentinel), is a pillar in Corral Hollow, in San Joaquin County, California. It rises to an elevation of 653 feet (199 m). According to legend, it was used as a hideout by members of the horse gang of Joaquin Murrieta. According to Frank Latta, it was used by bands of the horse gang to gather droves of wild and stolen horses from the plain beyond Corral Hollow for the next drove to Sonora.
