= Joaquin Rocks =

Group of three rock pillars in the American state of California

Joaquin Rocks Las Tres Piedras
- Rock formation
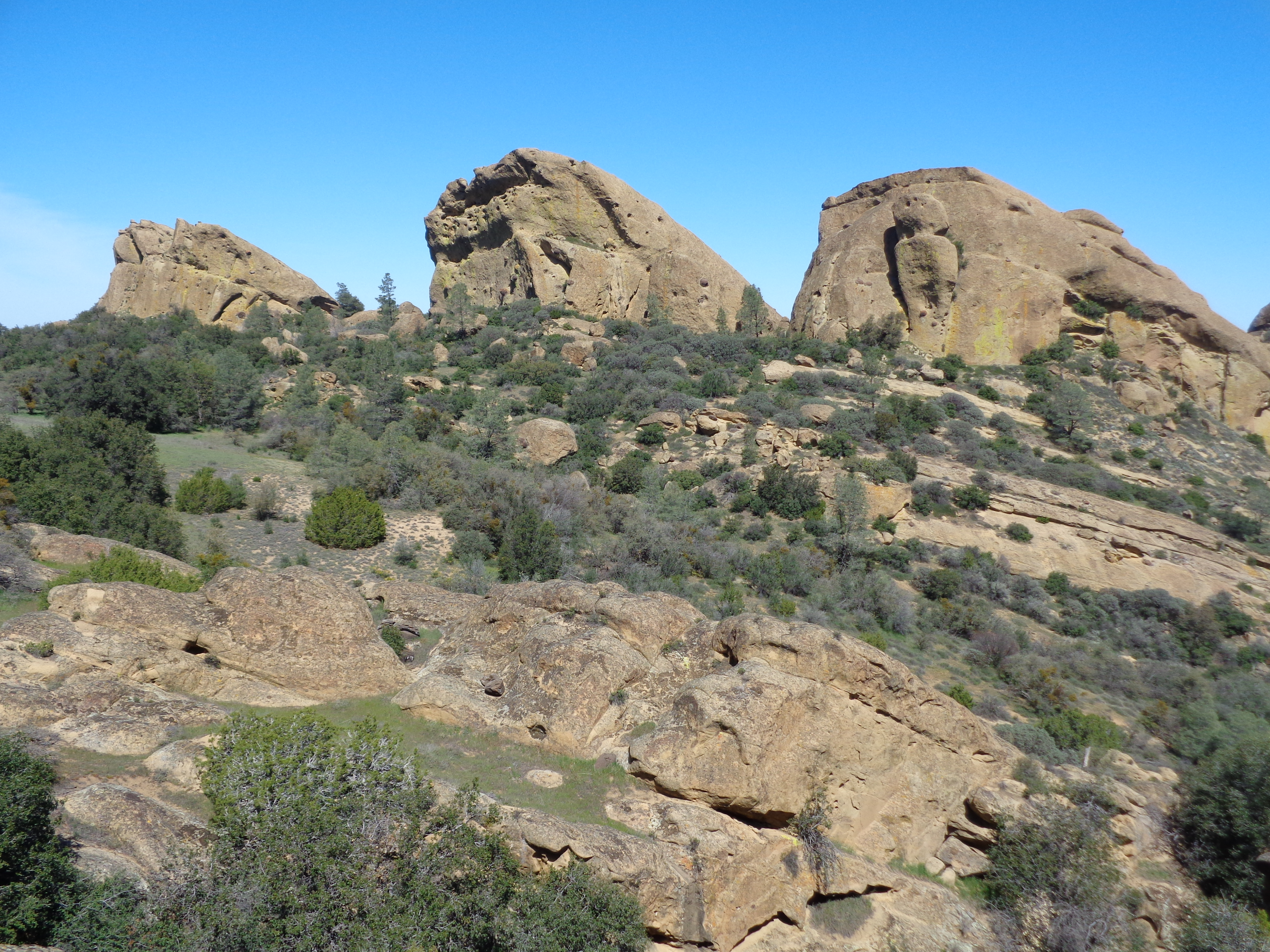

- Location within California
- Coordinates: 36°19′11″N 120°27′32″W
- Location: Fresno County, California, U.S.
- Elevation: 1,256 m (4,121 ft)

Joaquin Rocks are a group of three pillars of rock, originally known as "Las Tres Piedras" (The Three Rocks), located on Joaquin Ridge, in the Diablo Range, in Fresno County, California. The Joaquin Rocks are at an elevation of 4,121 feet (1,256 meters), and are the most distinguishing feature of Joaquin Ridge. The three pillars of rock are clearly visible on the ridge for many miles from many directions in the San Joaquin Valley and from their summits have a view of much of the valley. It is located, 3 miles (4.8 km) west-northwest of Black Mountain (Anticline Ridge) and 3 miles (4.8 km) southwest of Ragged Valley.

== History ==
The rocks were named for Joaquin Murrieta (1830-1853), a Sonoran 49'er turned bandit during the California Gold Rush after his death at the hands of the California Rangers in the Arroyo de Cantua. He and his gang used this region as a base and a refuge for their business of horse theft and robbery. The Rocks themselves were used as a lookout, overlooking the approaches to their rancho in the Arroyo de Cantua.

The small town of Three Rocks, California is named for the rocks.
