= Kern Canyon (Stanislaus County) =

Kern Canyon is a canyon and stream in Stanislaus County, California. The mouth of the stream in Kern Canyon is at an elevation of 302 feet (92 meters), just beyond the mouth of the canyon on the west side of Interstate 5 in California. Its source is located at 37°28′59″N 121°17′00″W at an elevation of 1,725 feet (526 meters) in the Diablo Range.
