= Del Puerto Creek =

Stream in California

Del Puerto Creek Arroyo de La Puerta, Arroyo del Puerto, Puerto Creek
- Etymology: Spanish
- Native name: Arroyo de La Puerta (Spanish)

Location
- Country: United States
- State: California
- Region: Stanislaus County

Physical characteristics
- Source
  - location: Red Mountain, just east of the Diablo Range Crest
  - coordinates: 37°23′50″N 121°27′26″W
  - elevation: 2,777 ft (846 m)
- Mouth: mouth
  - location: Confluence with the San Joaquin River in Stanislaus County
  - coordinates: 37°32′29″N 121°06′56″W
  - elevation: 30 ft (9.1 m)

Basin features
- River system: San Joaquin River

Del Puerto Creek, originally Arroyo de La Puerta (Creek of the Door), is an east-by northeast-flowing 32-mile-long (51 km) tributary stream of the San Joaquin River. The creek drains the eastern slopes of part of the Diablo Range within the Central Valley of California, United States. After passing through Patterson, the creek enters the San Joaquin River, about 4.9 miles (7.9 km) north of Patterson in Stanislaus County, California.

== History ==
The Indigenous peoples of Del Puerto Canyon were the Hoyumne and Miumne, sub-tribes of the Northern Valley Yokuts. Archaeological remains include grinding rocks, cooking ovens, burial grounds, dwelling structures, and a prehistoric pathway carved into the Gateway rocks at the entrance to the canyon.

Arroyo de La Puerta was a watering place on El Camino Viejo which the Spanish named for the narrow exit a "puerta" or door, where the creek emerged from the La Puerta Canyon into the San Joaquin Valley. It provided the southern boundary of Rancho Pescadero (Grimes) and the northern boundary of Rancho Del Puerto.

== Course and watershed ==
Del Puerto Creek drains the eastern slopes of the Diablo Range, running 24 miles (39 km) until it enters the flat Central Valley plain and then another 8 miles (13 km) before reaching the San Joaquin River about 4.9 miles (7.9 km) north by northeast of downtown Patterson, California. It begins on the eastern and southern flanks of 3,652 feet (1,113 m) tall Red Mountain and drains 76.2 square miles (197 km^{2}), the second largest of the 13 tributaries of the San Joaquin River's westside basin (the 141 square miles (370 km^{2}) Orestimba Creek watershed is the largest). Red Mountain is part of the Diablo Range Crest and is just east of Stanislaus County's border with Santa Clara County.

Del Puerto Canyon Road follows the creek west from Patterson to the San Antonio Valley where it connects to westbound California State Route 130 which connects San Jose and the Santa Clara Valley to the San Antonio Valley.

Del Puerto Creek receives several tributaries (heading downstream): first an unnamed stream which joins the creek from the left at Hideout Canyon, then Adobe Creek which joins from the right at Adobe Canyon, then another unnamed creek (locally known as Deer Creek) which joins from the left at Deer Park Canyon, then Falls Creek joining from the right, then the creek passes through Slick Rock Canyon, Salt Grass Canyon, Washington Canyon, Murderers Gulch, then receives from the right Garden Canyon Creek at Garden Canyon, and finally, passes through Windmill Canyon before opening to the valley floor. Many of these place names evoke historical references to Gold Rush era bandits hiding out in Del Puerto Canyon, including Joaquin Murrieta who hid his gathered wild mustangs in what is now Adobe Valley Ranch along Del Puerto Canyon's Adobe Creek tributary, before heading south to Sonora, Mexico to sell them.

Adobe Springs is an artesian spring that produces magnesium-rich water, located on Del Puerto Creek's Adobe Springs tributary. Its spring water are sold to 7 Up's bottling plant in Modesto.

== Ecology ==
Del Puerto Creek is of high ecological importance to the Diablo Range because although its flows are generally intermittent, it offers wildlife year-round water supplies via perennial spring-fed pools. It harbors several California Endangered Species Act threatened species including puma (Puma concolor) Central Coast North ESU, and state-ranked S2 (imperiled) western burrowing owl (Athene cunicularia hypugaea) and foothill yellow-legged frog (Rana boylii) and S3 (vulnerable) American badger (Taxidea taxus), tule elk (Cervus canadensis nannodes) and golden eagle (Aquila chrysaetos). Del Puerto Creek's perennial flows and adjacent aquatic habitats are special aquatic sites under EPA's 404(b)(I) guidelines because they contain wetlands and riffle and pool complexes critical to multiple threatened amphibian and fish species. These include federally threatened California red-legged frogs (Rana draytonii), California tiger salamanders (Ambystoma californiense) central California distinct population segment (DPS). An environmental impact report generated by the proponents to dam Del Puerto Creek failed to review dozens of California special status species known to occur near the dam site and a biological survey supported by the Save Mount Diablo land trust and environmental organization found 15 times more species in a single half day of survey in 2025 (including 15 California special status species).

Historically, William Henry Brewer described in his Up and Down California camping in the Cañada del Puerto or "Door Canyon" on June 10, 1862: "since we left Corral Hollow we have had no road ... we came upon a herd of thirty of forty antelope ... as fleet as the wind when really alarmed ... Here we found another sheep ranch–a cabin, and two men keeping four thousand sheep."

== Pollution ==
As of 2020, the Westside-San Joaquin Stormwater Management Plan lists Del Puerto Creek's agricultural reaches in the Central Valley as a 303(d)-Listed Impaired Water Body due to numerous pesticides, fecal bacteria and salinity.

== Recreation ==
The Frank Raines Regional Park is a Stanislaus County Park about 18 miles west of Patterson on Del Puerto Canyon Road. It includes an 1,000 acres (400 hectares) eastern section known as the Minnier Area for non-motorized recreation uses (e.g. hiking and nature trails, and limited deer and wild pig hunting, etc.) and a campground at Deer Park Canyon, and a western section that is an off-highway vehicle park.

== See also ==
- San Joaquin River
- Diablo Range
