= Black Mountain (Anticline Ridge) =

Mountain in the American state of California

- Location within California

Highest point
- Elevation: 3,626 ft (1,105 m)
- Prominence: 440 ft (130 m)
- Coordinates: 36°18′16.19″N 120°24′11.20″W

Geography
- Location: Fresno County, California, United States
- Parent range: Diablo Range
- Topo map: USGS Joaquin Rocks

Black Mountain is a summit and the high point of Anticline Ridge in the Diablo Range of Fresno County, California. It rises to an elevation of 3,629 feet (1,106 meters).
