= Isabel Valley =

Valley in Santa Clara County, California, United States

Isabel Valley is a valley in the Diablo Range in Santa Clara County, California. It is also known as Santa Ysabel Valley.

The mouth of Isabel Valley lies at an elevation of 2,270 feet (690 meters). Its head is at 37°19′17″N 121°29′44″W at an elevation of 2,480 feet (760 meters).

== History ==
Isabel Valley was used by the Five Joaquins Gang of Joaquin Murrieta to hold stolen horses until they could be driven southward on the La Vereda del Monte.
