= Lone Tree Creek (San Joaquin River tributary) =

River in California

Location
- Country: United States
- State: California
- County: San Joaquin County, California

Physical characteristics
- Source
  - location: Confluence of North Fork and Middle Fork in the Diablo Range
  - coordinates: 37°34′15″N 121°26′24″W
  - elevation: 790 ft (241 m)
- Mouth: Formerly the San Joaquin River; later diverted into the Delta–Mendota Canal
  - coordinates: 37°38′24″N 121°21′12″W
  - elevation: 290 ft (88 m)

Basin features
- Progression: Delta–Mendota Canal → San Joaquin River → Sacramento–San Joaquin River Delta → Suisun Bay → San Francisco Bay → Pacific Ocean
- River system: San Joaquin River watershed
- Tributaries
  - left: North Fork Lone Tree Creek
  - right: Middle Fork Lone Tree Creek
- Status: Largely diverted and interrupted by development

Lone Tree Creek is a tributary stream of the San Joaquin River now diverted, in San Joaquin County, California. Its source is in the Diablo Range at its confluence with its North Fork and Middle Fork tributary streams an elevation of 790 feet (240 meters). Its mouth was originally at its confluence with the San Joaquin River, but later was diverted into the Delta Mendota Canal, but now interrupted by development, reaches just past the mouth of its canyon at an elevation of 290 feet (88 meters).
