= Whites Bridge, California =

Whites Bridge White's Bridge, Whitesbridge
- Former settlement
- Location in California
- Coordinates: 36°43′58″N 120°20′33″W
- Country: United States
- State: California
- County: Fresno
- Established: 1879
- Elevation: 157 ft (48 m)

Whites Bridge or Whitesbridge is a former settlement on the Fresno Slough near Tranquillity in Fresno County, California, United States.

== History ==
The settlement grew around White's Bridge, a bridge built over the Fresno Slough ten miles above Firebaugh by Fresno County pioneer James R. White. The settlement of Whites Bridge became the new head of steamboat navigation on the slough at high water. Whites Bridge post office opened January 9, 1879. By 1881, the settlement, in addition to the post office, had a store and hotel, and was the site of sheep shearing. The wool and produce of local farms was shipped down river to Stockton and San Francisco. Large ranch holdings belonging to Miller & Lux lay nearby along the San Joaquin River. The Whites Bridge post office closed on November 15, 1893, and was moved to Mendota.
