= Tumey Hills =

Mountain range in California

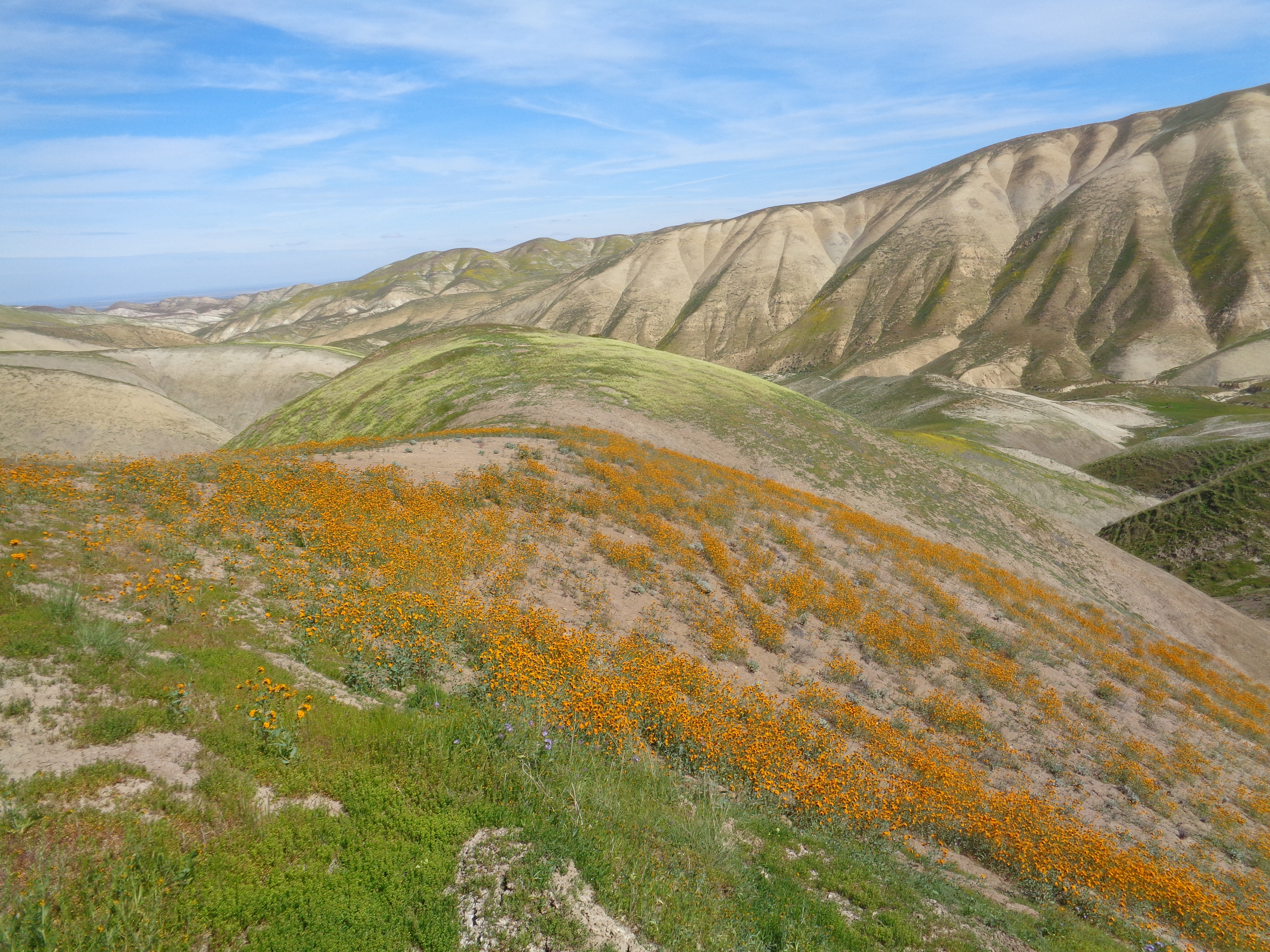

Highest point
- Elevation: 747 m (2,451 ft)

Geography
- Location within California Location within the United States
- Country: United States
- State: California
- District(s): Fresno County and San Benito County
- Range coordinates: 36°32′5.831″N 120°39′31.620″W
- Topo map: USGS Tumey Hills

The Tumey Hills are a low mountain range in the interior California Coast Ranges, in western Fresno County and southeastern San Benito County, California. The Tumey Hills area is part of the U.S. Bureau of Land Management (BLM), which is a division of the United States Department of the Interior. This BLM land is under Fire Season Vehicle Restrictions from mid-April to mid-October. No motorized access is allowed during this time period.

== Flora ==
Tumey Hills BLM offers a mixture of native and non-native species. Non-native plants include:

1. Wild Oats (Avena spp.)
2. Filaree (Erodium spp.)
3. Barnyard Foxtail (Hordeum murinum)
4. Bromus spp.
5. Rat-tail Fescue (Vulpia myuros)

Native plants of Tumey Hills include:

1. Forked Fiddleneck (Amsinckia furcata)
2. Miner's lettuce (Claytonia perfoliata)
