= Kellogg Creek (Indian Slough tributary) =

Small river in California, USA

Kellogg Creek is a tributary of Indian Slough, in Contra Costa County, California. Indian Slough itself is a tributary of the Old River, an old channel of the San Joaquin River.

== History ==
Kellogg Creek was formerly named Arroyo Santa Ángela de Fulgino by Pedro Font, on April 4, 1776, as the expedition of Juan Bautista de Anza passed through the area. In the 19th century it was known to the Californios as Arroyo del Sur.

== Geography ==
The mouth of Kellogg Creek lies at an elevation of 7 feet (2.1 meters) at its confluence with Indian Slough in Contra Costa County. Its source is located at 37°47′23″N 121°42′51″W at the head of a canyon in the hills north of Brushy Peak, in the Diablo Range in Alameda County, California. It arises at an elevation of 1,162 feet (354 meters).
