= Crane Ridge =

Coordinates: 37°36′21″N 121°37′14″W

Crane Ridge is a 6 mile long ridge of the Diablo Range in Alameda County, California. Crane Ridge runs southeast from the Livermore Valley toward Mount Wallace. Its highest point is at 2,939 feet (896 meters).
