= Murrieta Spring =

Historic spring

Coordinates: 36°24′34″N 120°24′20″W

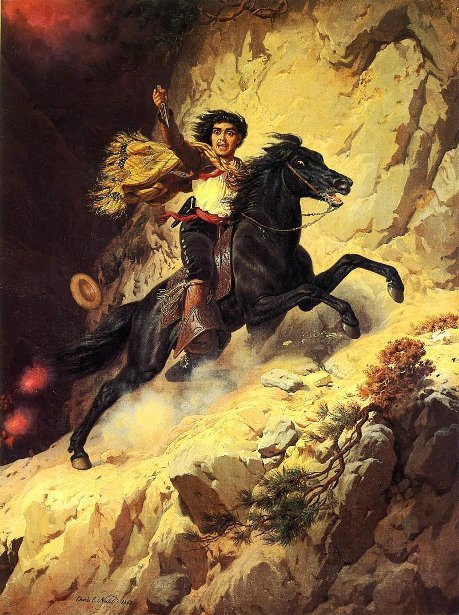
Murrieta Spring is named after Joaquín Murrieta, known as the "Robin Hood of California".

Murrieta Spring is a historic spring flowing from the south bank of Cantua Creek, about 100 yards above where El Camino Viejo crossed the Creek in the San Joaquin Valley. The Spring formed a pool in the arroyo where it emerged from the foot of the eastern mountains of the Diablo Range, a mile above where formerly California State Route 33, now South Derrick Avenue, crosses Cantua Creek. This is where Harry Love and his detachment of California Rangers found the gang of Joaquin Murrieta at the spring and attacked them on July 25, 1853.

Years later wells drilled by the Lillis Ranch to provide water for livestock stopped the flow of water from the spring.
