= San Juan Valley =

Valley in California, United States

- Location within California

Naming
- Native name: Canada de San Benito; Llano De San Juan (Spanish)

Geography
- Country: United States
- State: California
- Region: San Benito County
- Coordinates: 36°52′52″N 121°33′21″W
- Interactive map of San Juan Valley

San Juan Valley, sometimes called San Benito Valley formerly Canada de San Benito or Llano De San Juan is a valley that has its head near the Gabilan Range. Bounded on the north by the Lomerias Muertas and the Flint Hills and south and east by the Gabilan Range, and the gap between the Gabilan Range and Flint Hills where the San Benito River enters the valley from the east. It terminated where the San Benito River has its confluence the Pajaro River, about 15 miles (24 km) upstream from the river's outlet in Monterey Bay. It is the lowest part of the watershed of the San Benito River and can be considered part of the San Benito Valley.

Named for the Mission San Juan Bautista which was established in this valley.
