= Big Blue Hills =

- Location within California

Highest point
- Elevation: 564 m (1,850 ft)

Geography
- Country: United States
- State: California
- Region(s): California Coast Ranges, San Joaquin Valley
- District: Fresno County
- Range coordinates: 36°21′23″N 120°24′14″W
- Topo map: USGS Joaquin Rocks

The Big Blue Hills are a low mountain range in west Fresno County, in the western San Joaquin Valley of central California.

Interstate 5 runs parallel to the hills on the east.

== Geography ==
The Big Blue Hills are in the Southern Inner California Coast Ranges System, adjacent to the Diablo Range on the west. Their highest point is 564 metres (1,850 ft) in elevation.

Cantua Creek and its Arroyo de Cantúa canyon divides them from the Ciervo Hills.
