= Bitterwater Valley =

Valley in California

Bitterwater Valley is a valley in San Benito County, California. Its mouth is located at an elevation of 971 feet (296 meters) near the confluence of Bitterwater Creek with Lewis Creek a tributary to San Lorenzo Creek, a tributary of the Salinas River. Its head is at 1,630 feet (500 meters), at 36°23′07″N 120°58′31″W.
