= Cantua Creek, California =

Cantua Creek
- Unincorporated Community; Census Designated Place
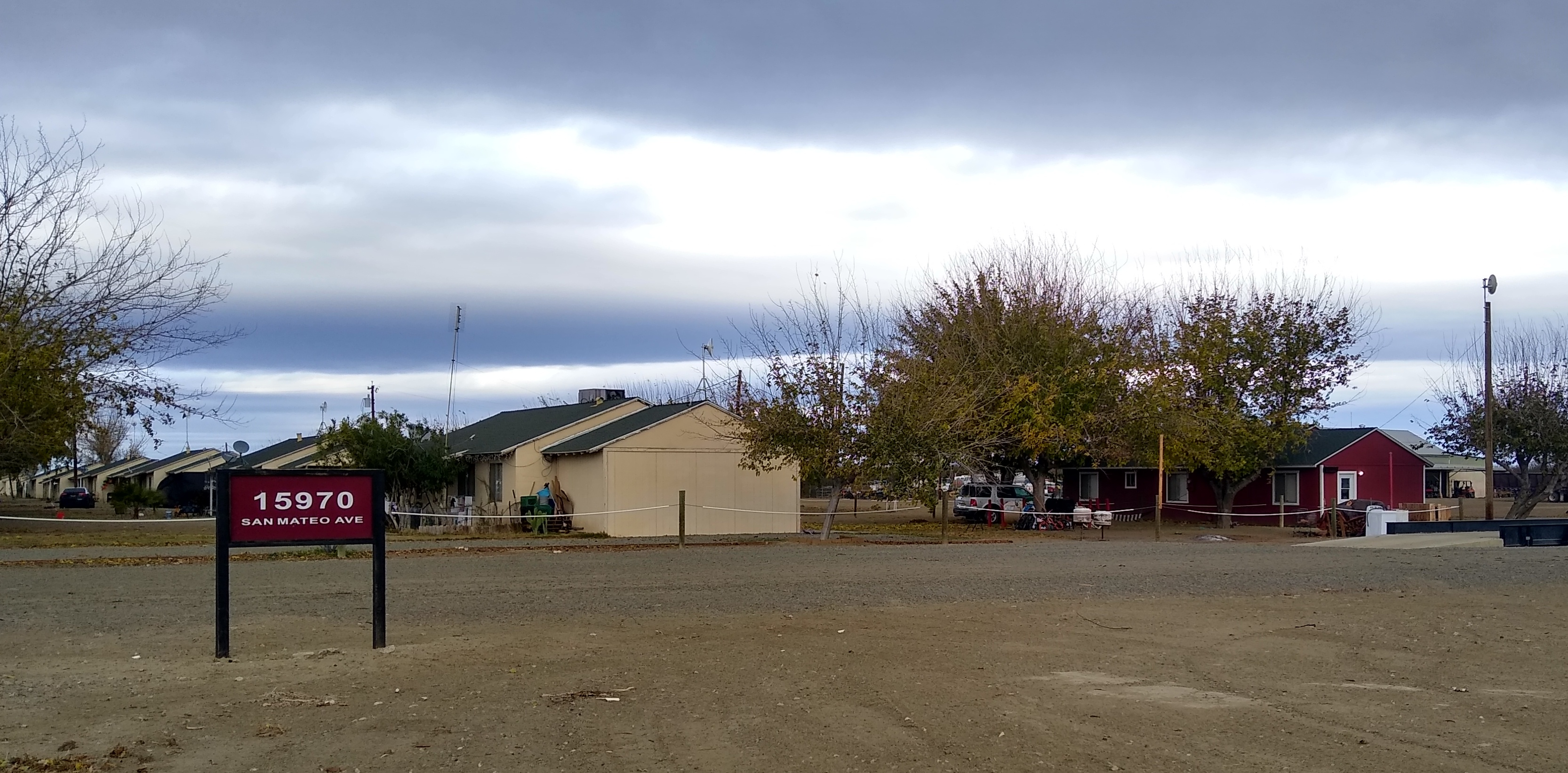

- Location in Fresno County and the state of California

- Location in the United States Location in California
- Coordinates: 36°30′05″N 120°18′59″W
- Country: United States
- State: California
- County: Fresno

Government
  - State Senator: Anna Caballero (D)
  - State Assembly: Esmeralda Soria (D)
  - U. S. Congress: Adam Gray (D)

Area
  - Total: 3.80 sq mi (9.83 km^{2})
  - Land: 3.80 sq mi (9.83 km^{2})
  - Water: 0 sq mi (0.00 km^{2}) 0%
- Elevation: 300 ft (90 m)

Population (2020)
  - Total: 500
  - Density: 131.7/sq mi (50.85/km^{2})
- Time zone: UTC-8 (Pacific (PST))
  - Summer (DST): UTC-7 (PDT)
- ZIP code: 93608
- Area code: 559
- FIPS code: 06-10816
- GNIS feature IDs: 220554, 2407954

Cantua Creek (formerly, Cantua and Cantuna) is a census-designated place (CDP) in Fresno County, California, United States. As of the 2020 census, the population was 500, up from the 466 reported at the 2010 census. Cantua Creek is located 11 miles (18 km) south-southwest of Tranquillity, at an elevation of 295 feet (90 m).

== Geography ==
According to the United States Census Bureau, the CDP has a total area of 3.8 square miles (9.8 km^{2}), all land.

=== Climate ===
According to the Köppen Climate Classification system, Cantua Creek has a semi-arid climate, abbreviated "BSk" on climate maps.

== History ==
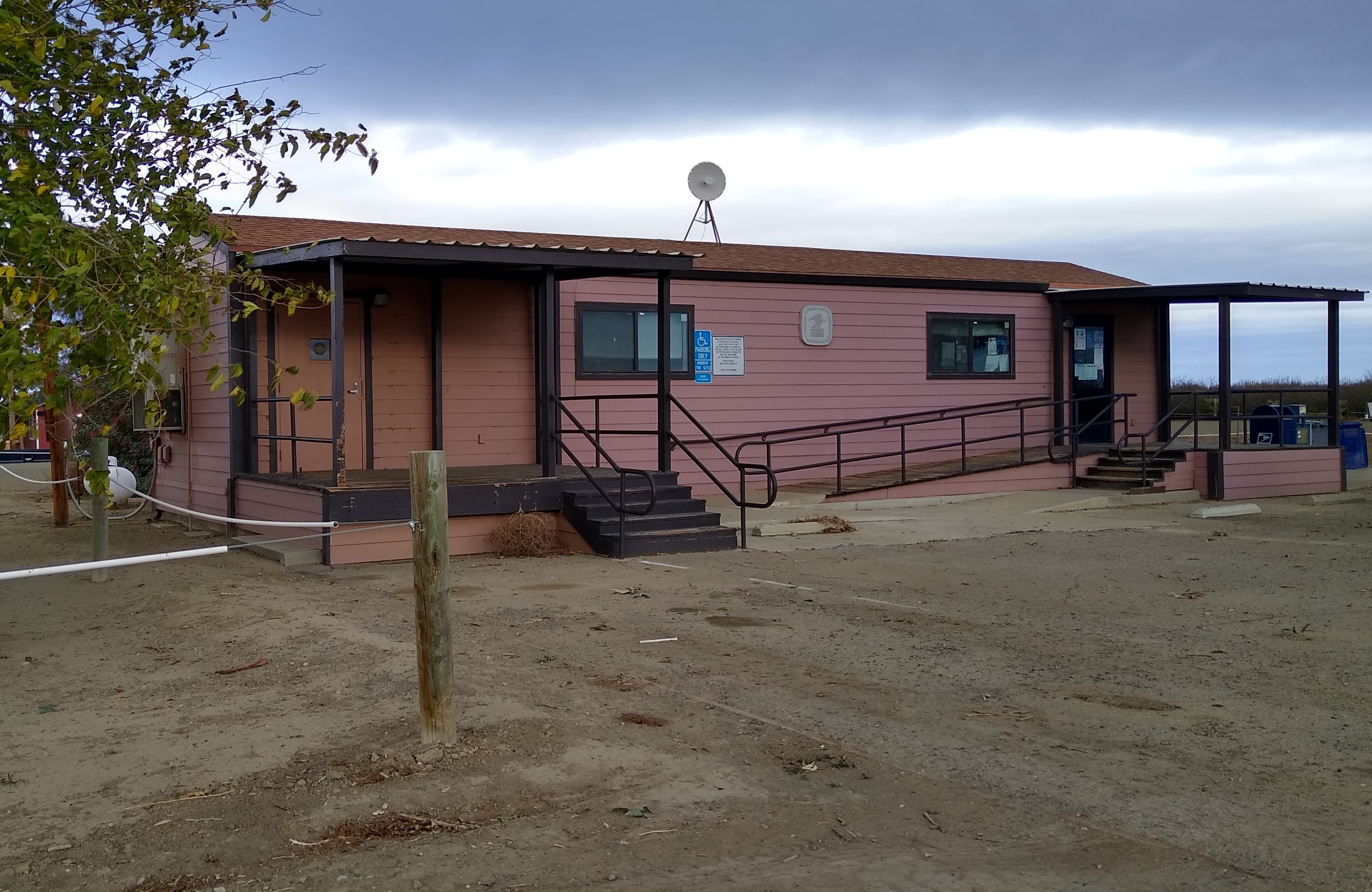
Cantua Creek Post Office in 2021

The community of Cantua Creek is located near Cantua Creek, a tributary of the Fresno Slough that flows down from the Coast Range to the west toward the Fresno Slough. That creek originally, Arroyo de Cantua, was a stopping place on the El Camino Viejo. The hideout of Joaquin Murrieta was located in the vicinity of this creek in the mountains to the west of this community.

The Cantua post office operated in 1888, and from 1890 to 1892. The Cantua Creek post office opened in 1941.

== Demographics ==
Historical population
Census	Pop.	Note	%±
2000	655		—
2010	466		−28.9%
2020	500		7.3%
U.S. Decennial Census; 1850–1870 1880-1890; 1900 1910 1920; 1930 1940 1950; 1960 1970 1980; 1990 2000 2010

Cantua Creek first appeared as a census designated place in the 2000 U.S. census.

=== 2020 census ===
As of the 2020 census, Cantua Creek had a population of 500. The median age was 29.6 years. 29.6% of residents were under the age of 18 and 10.2% of residents were 65 years of age or older. For every 100 females there were 121.2 males, and for every 100 females age 18 and over there were 122.8 males age 18 and over.

0.0% of residents lived in urban areas, while 100.0% lived in rural areas.

There were 118 households in Cantua Creek, of which 33.1% had children under the age of 18 living in them. Of all households, 63.6% were married-couple households, 19.5% were households with a male householder and no spouse or partner present, and 6.8% were households with a female householder and no spouse or partner present. About 6.8% of all households were made up of individuals and 3.4% had someone living alone who was 65 years of age or older.

There were 126 housing units, of which 6.3% were vacant. The homeowner vacancy rate was 0.0% and the rental vacancy rate was 0.0%.

Racial composition as of the 2020 census
Race	Number	Percent
White	78	15.6%
Black or African American	2	0.4%
American Indian and Alaska Native	8	1.6%
Asian	4	0.8%
Native Hawaiian and Other Pacific Islander	0	0.0%
Some other race	284	56.8%
Two or more races	124	24.8%
Hispanic or Latino (of any race)	468	93.6%

=== 2010 census ===
The 2010 United States census reported that Cantua Creek had a population of 466. The population density was 122.7 inhabitants per square mile (47.4/km^{2}). The racial makeup of Cantua Creek was 244 (52.4%) White, 5 (1.1%) African American, 3 (0.6%) Native American, 1 (0.2%) Asian, 0 (0.0%) Pacific Islander, 199 (42.7%) from other races, and 14 (3.0%) from two or more races. Hispanic or Latino of any race were 461 persons (98.9%).

The Census reported that 461 people (98.9% of the population) lived in households, 5 (1.1%) lived in non-institutionalized group quarters, and 0 (0%) were institutionalized.

There were 113 households, out of which 66 (58.4%) had children under the age of 18 living in them, 77 (68.1%) were opposite-sex married couples living together, 15 (13.3%) had a female householder with no husband present, 12 (10.6%) had a male householder with no wife present. There were 6 (5.3%) unmarried opposite-sex partnerships, and 0 (0%) same-sex married couples or partnerships. 6 households (5.3%) were made up of individuals, and 1 (0.9%) had someone living alone who was 65 years of age or older. The average household size was 4.08. There were 104 families (92.0% of all households); the average family size was 4.24.

The age distribution was 144 people (30.9%) under the age of 18, 56 people (12.0%) aged 18 to 24, 137 people (29.4%) aged 25 to 44, 92 people (19.7%) aged 45 to 64, and 37 people (7.9%) who were 65 years of age or older. The median age was 28.0 years. For every 100 females, there were 130.7 males. For every 100 females age 18 and over, there were 133.3 males.

There were 128 housing units at an average density of 33.7 per square mile (13.0/km^{2}), of which 113 were occupied, of which 48 (42.5%) were owner-occupied, and 65 (57.5%) were occupied by renters. The homeowner vacancy rate was 0%; the rental vacancy rate was 8.5%. 198 people (42.5% of the population) lived in owner-occupied housing units and 263 people (56.4%) lived in rental housing units.

=== 2000 census ===
As of the census of 2000, there were 655 people, 141 households, and 131 families residing in the CDP. The population density was 172.7 inhabitants per square mile (66.7/km^{2}). There were 154 housing units at an average density of 40.6 per square mile (15.7/km^{2}). The racial makeup of the CDP was 42.60% White, 0.15% Black or African American, 0.61% Native American, 52.06% from other races, and 4.58% from two or more races. 93.74% of the population were Hispanic or Latino of any race.

There were 141 households, out of which 66.7% had children under the age of 18 living with them, 80.1% were married couples living together, 3.5% had a female householder with no husband present, and 6.4% were non-families. 2.8% of all households were made up of individuals, and none had someone living alone who was 65 years of age or older. The average household size was 4.51 and the average family size was 4.52.

The age distribution was 36.5% under the age of 18, 14.5% from 18 to 24, 29.6% from 25 to 44, 16.2% from 45 to 64, and 3.2% who were 65 years of age or older. The median age was 24 years. For every 100 females, there were 134.8 males. For every 100 females age 18 and over, there were 132.4 males.

The median income for a household in the CDP was $26,484, and the median income for a family was $26,484. Males had a median income of $0 versus $26,250 for females. The per capita income for the CDP was $5,693. About 26.7% of families and 38.1% of the population were below the poverty line, including 46.2% of those under age 18 and none of those age 65 or over.

== Education ==
Cantua Creek is served by the Golden Plains Unified School District.
