= Latta Creek =

Latta Creek is a tributary stream of Salado Creek in the Diablo Range in Stanislaus County, California. It has its source at 37°24′05″N 121°19′33″W. Its mouth is at its confluence with Salado Creek. The creek is named for Eli C. Latta, a pioneer that came to California during the California Gold Rush and homesteaded the headwaters of the creek.
