= Brushy Peak =

Mountain in the American state of California

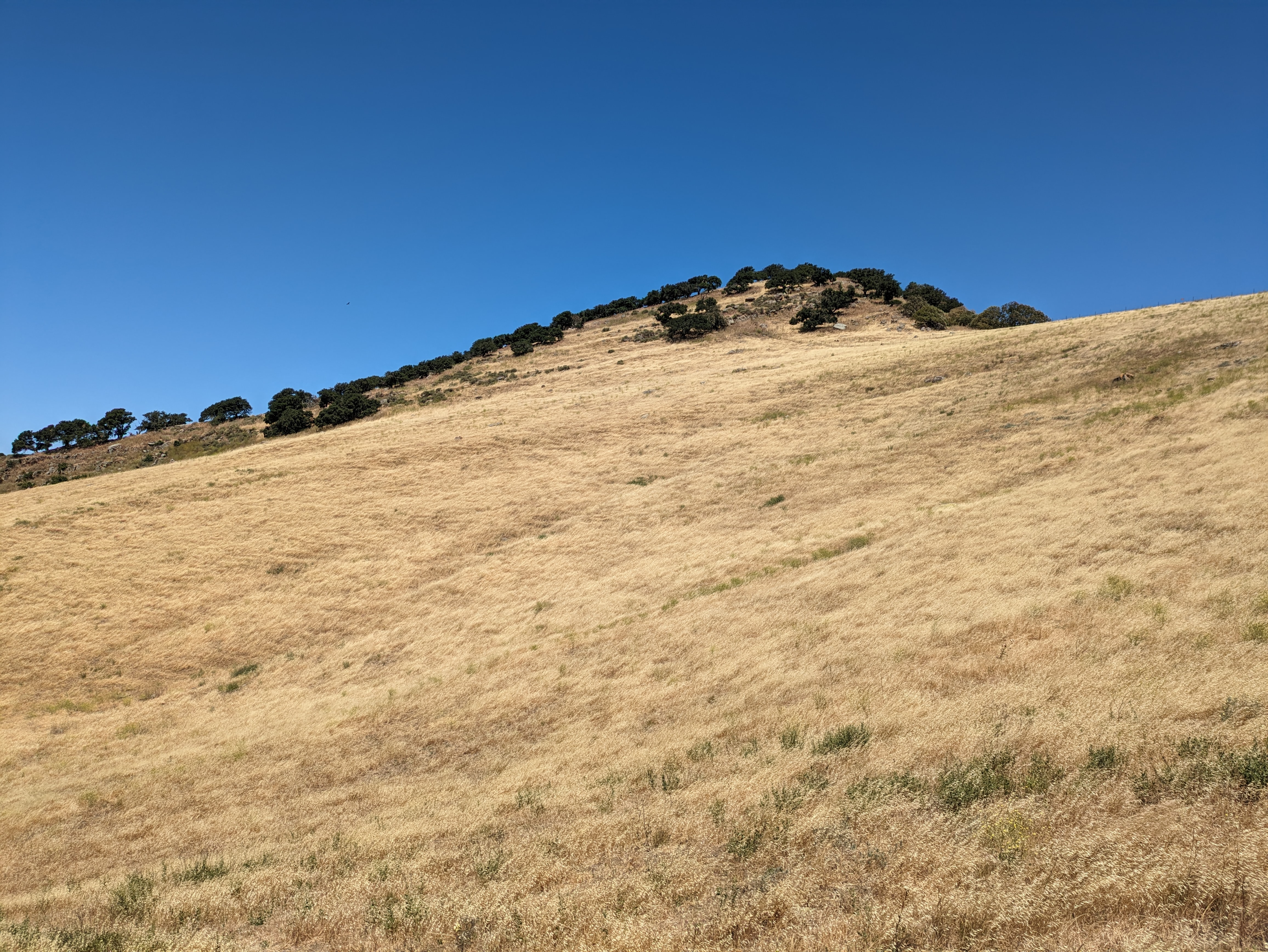

Highest point
- Elevation: 1,703 ft (519 m)
- Prominence: 722 ft (220 m)
- Coordinates: 37°46′2.68″N 121°42′11.02″W

Geography
- Location within California
- Location: Alameda County, California, United States
- Parent range: Diablo Range
- Topo map: USGS Byron Hot Springs

Brushy Peak, also known as Brushy Knob or Las Cuevas (The Caves), is a summit in Alameda County, California that overlooks the Livermore Valley. North of the valley, it is part of the Diablo Range. It rises to an elevation of 1,686 feet (514 m) and is the location of Brushy Peak Regional Preserve; there are guided tours to the peak itself.

Historically, the peak and its immediate surroundings were used for some outdoor events, like picnics.
