= Mesteñeros =

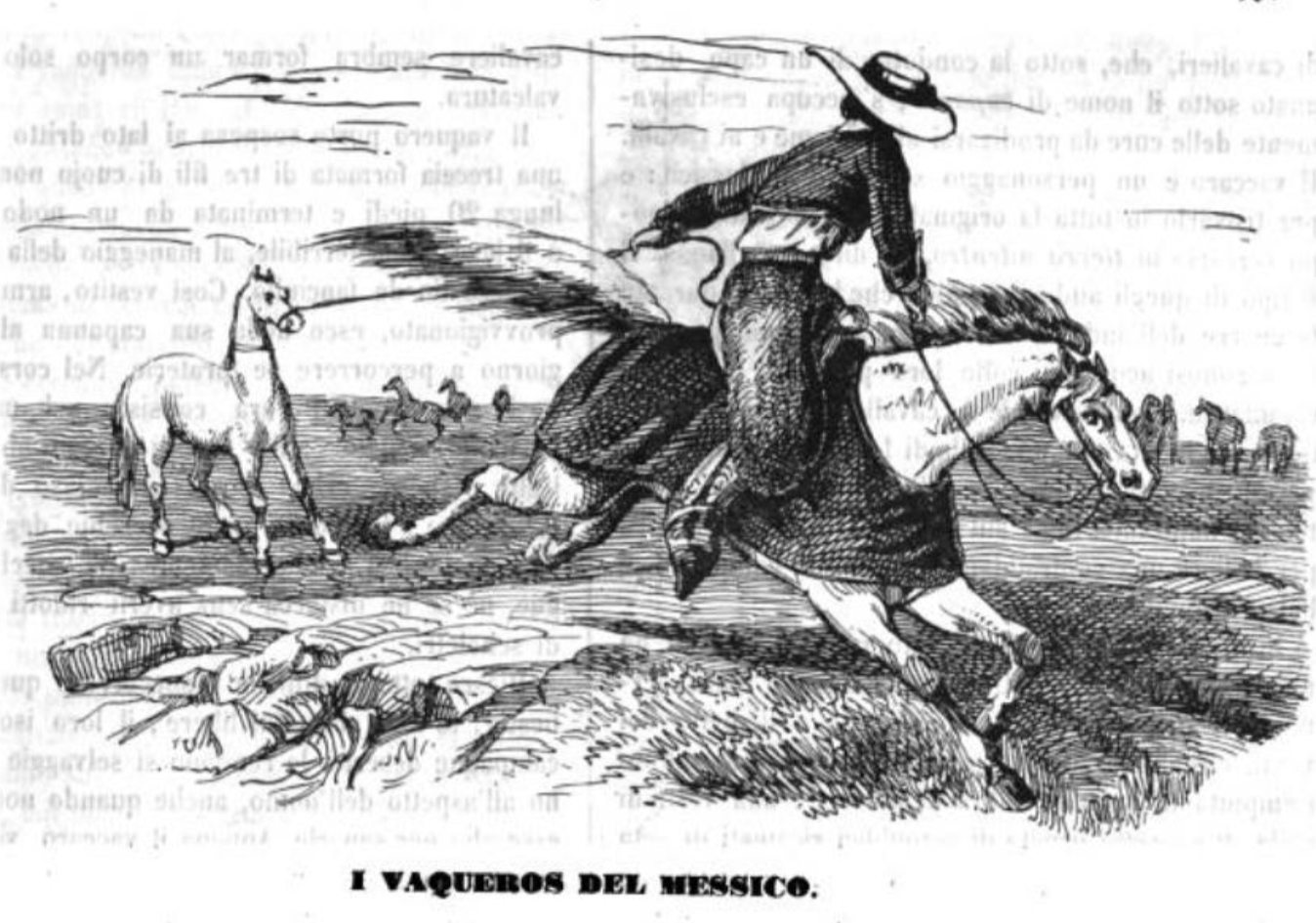
Mesteñeros were Charros who hunted Mesteño or “mustang” horses, wild ownerless horses.

Mesteñeros, or mustang runners, were people in Mexico, and later on in the United States, in the 16th, 17th, 18th, 19th and early 20th century, usually vaqueros or cowboys, that caught, broke and drove wild horses, called mesteños or mustangs, to market in what is now Central and Northern Mexico, Texas, New Mexico and California. These Mesteñeros operated originally in the 16th century in what is now Central Mexico, then, by the 18th century primarily in Northern Mexico, the Great Plains from Texas and New Mexico, and in California, primarily in the San Joaquin Valley during the 19th century and in the Great Basin during the 20th century.

== Etymology and History ==
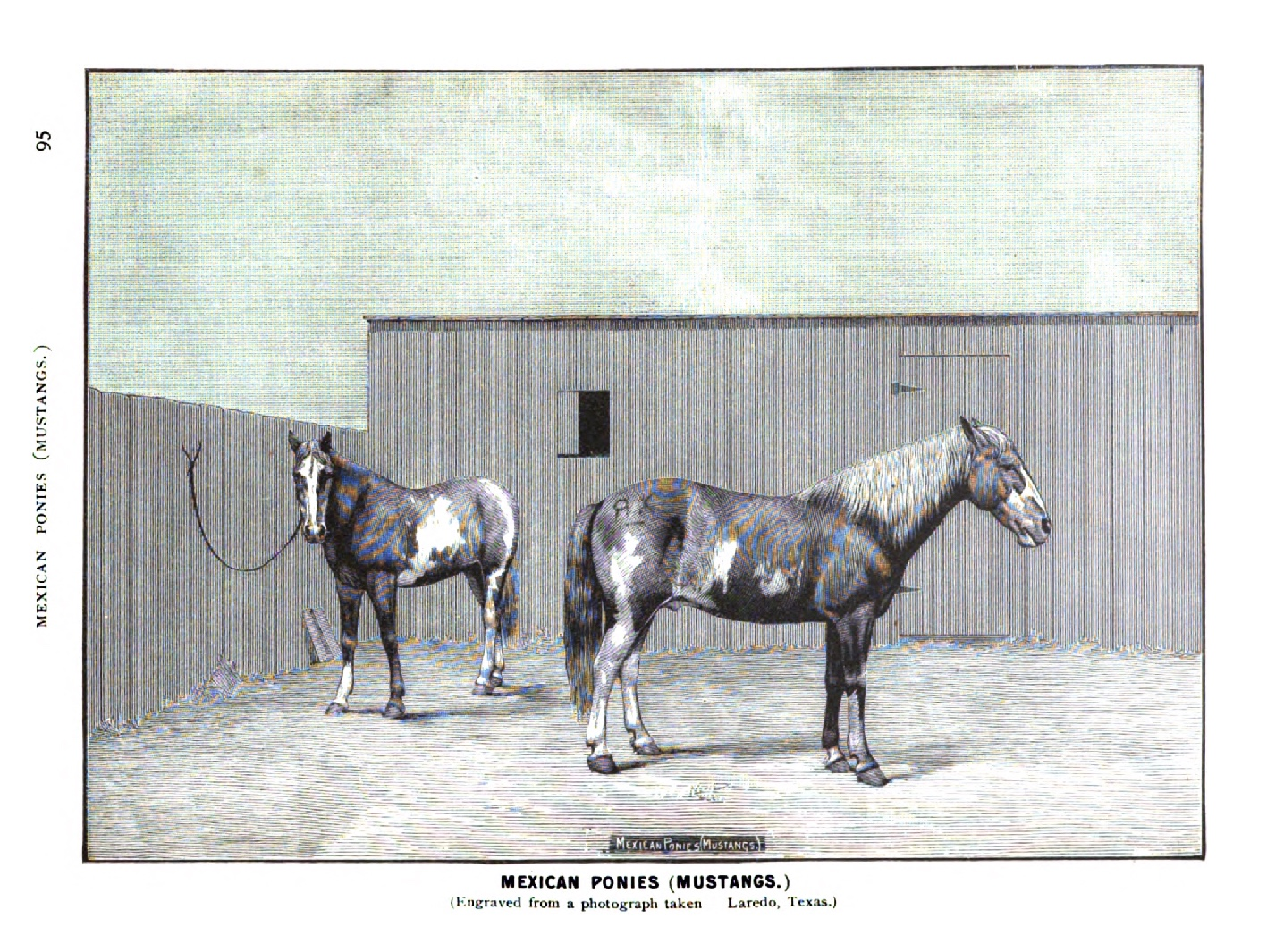
In Mexico, and later on the USA, the term Mesteño or Mustang was applied to the wild, ownerless Mexican horses.

“Mesteñero”, or mesteño hunter, derives from mesteño or wild ownerless horses. In Mexican Spanish, both, mesteño and mostrenco were used interchangeably and meant untamed, wild ownerless horses, mules and cattle that roamed free in the vastness of the Mexican countryside; synonymous with untamed, unbroken, bronco, ferocious, wild. The Mexican definition is the one adopted by the Americans. Although the vast majority of Mexican horses were raised in the wild, mesteños or mostrencos were only those that had no owner, thus, they were public property and under Mexican law any Mexican citizen could take possession of them. Prior to the 18th century, the proper name used in the country for such animals was cimarrrón or çimarrón, any animal, whether a horse or bull, that was wild and had no owner.

In Spain, Mesteño referred originally to any stray livestock animal of uncertain ownership that ended under the ownership of the powerful transhumant merino sheep ranchers' guild in medieval Spain, called the Mesta (Honrado Concejo de la Mesta, 'Honorable Council of the Mesta'); mesteño, in Castilian Spanish, literally means, “lo que toca o pertenece a la Mesta” (what belongs to the Mesta). The name of the Mesta derived ultimately from the Latin: mixta, lit. 'mixed', referring to the common ownership of the guild's animals by multiple parties. While Mostrenco, is any goods, including beasts and jewels, that had been abandoned or whose ownership is uncertain and, as such, after a year and one day they fall under the ownership of the Prince or to the community that has privilege over it. It derives from mostrar, which means “to present” or “to manifest” because by law, after finding said goods, they must present or manifest them to the authorities. In Spain, it also means a person who doesn’t have a home or a master, someone who is ignorant or slow to reason or learn, and someone who is fat and heavy.

== The great Mustang hunts (Cacería de la Caballada Mesteña) ==
The hunt for the mesteño horse was a grand event, a great battle between man and beast. The hunt was colloquially called by the Mexicans, correr mesteños, that is hunting mesteños with the lasso as they were hunted using their reatas. The great hunts for mesteño horses took place after the rainy season (monsoon) and during the winter rains, between October and December, or after the melting of the snow, when the watering holes were replenished and the pastures were renewed, and the horses came down to drink, mainly in the region colloquially known as "Los Llanos" (the plains), an area that stretched from northern Zacatecas in the south to southern New Mexico in the north, and west to the foothills of the Sierra Madre Occidental in Chihuahua to the foothills of the Sierra Madre Oriental in Nuevo León to the east. In this large area, the Bolsón de Mapimí region alone had, by the late 18th century, more than 230,000 wild horses.

For this great hunt, or rodeo as it was called by the Rancheros—for it was a grand roundup—a large number of men was required, typically between 100 and 200 skilled, cunning, and well-mounted riders and enough provisions for at least a month. These Rancheros would go out in search of the herds in groups of six to ten, wandering for many days across the vast plains, deserts, and mountains until they found their target. This operation required time and great patience, as the entire process, from the moment they set out until they were captured, could take weeks. When they finally managed to locate the horses, they built a very large and wide corral made out of thick mezquite wood with double palisades tied with strong leather ropes, where they would enclose them. Once the construction of the corral was finished and covered with grass and bushes so as not to alarm the horses, the roundup began, which consisted of the hunters dividing into groups of five, ten and fifteen men positioning themselves in certain places surrounding an area of more than twenty leagues (approximately 65 miles) in order to block the passage of the herds, forcing them towards the point where the corral was built. The enclosure process was a very dangerous and violent battle in which many horses and men perished. When they finally managed to capture and enclose enough of them—hundreds of them—they would leave them without food and water for six days. Weakened and exhausted, they were then joined by tamed mares called "caponeras" and lead them to the pastures and corrals where they would be sorted and tested to later be taken to the large cities to be sold.
