= Cantua Creek (Fresno Slough tributary) =

- Etymology: Spanish
- Native name: Arroyo de Cantúa (Spanish)

Location
- Country: United States
- State: California
- Region: Fresno County

Physical characteristics
- Source: source
  - location: on the northwest slope of Santa Rita Peak in the Diablo Range., San Benito County
  - coordinates: 36°20′58″N 120°36′19″W
  - elevation: 4,200 ft (1,300 m)
- Mouth: mouth
  - location: 4 miles south of Cantua Creek, California., Fresno County
  - coordinates: 36°26′51″N 120°18′36″W
  - elevation: 344 ft (105 m)

California Historical Landmark
- Official name: Arroyo de Cantúa
- Reference no.: 344

Cantua Creek, formerly in Spanish Arroyo de Cantúa, was named for José de Guadalupe Cantúa, a prominent Californio Ranchero in the 19th-century Mexican era of Alta California.

The creek was formerly a tributary of the Fresno Slough, in years of very heavy winter rains.

== Course ==
Its source is on the northern slope of Santa Rita Peak in the Diablo Range, 5.9 miles southeast of Idria within San Benito County. It flows north then east into Fresno County, emerging from its Arroyo de Cantúa canyon, that divides the Big Blue Hills from the Ciervo Hills, into the western San Joaquin Valley.

Continuing toward the Fresno Slough to the northeast, but no longer reaching it, Cantua Creek ends shortly after passing under Interstate 5, 4 miles south of the census-designated place of Cantua Creek and just west of the California Aqueduct.

== History ==
The Arroyo de Cantúa was first explored by a detachment of troops under José de Guadalupe Cantúa (1786–1860) who served in the Spanish army, stationed at San Juan Bautista, and lead the party that first explored the Arroyo Cantúa area while gathering in the Native American people that lived in the area for the Mission San Juan. Arroyo Cantúa was named in his honor. He was later granted the Rancho San Luisito near San Luis Obispo.

The 19th century Spanish and Mexican El Camino Viejo trail crossed the Arroyo Cantúa in the San Joaquin Valley.

=== Rancho de Cantua ===
Two of Guadalupe Cantúa's sons, Lupe and Domingo, later established a ranch on the Arroyo Cantúa. They were members of the California bandit Joaquin Murrieta's Five Joaquins Gang and their ranch in the mountains on the Arroyo Cantúa was the gathering place for the gangs herd of stolen horses and mustangs the gang would organize for the drive down to their ranch in Sonora, Mexico for later sale.

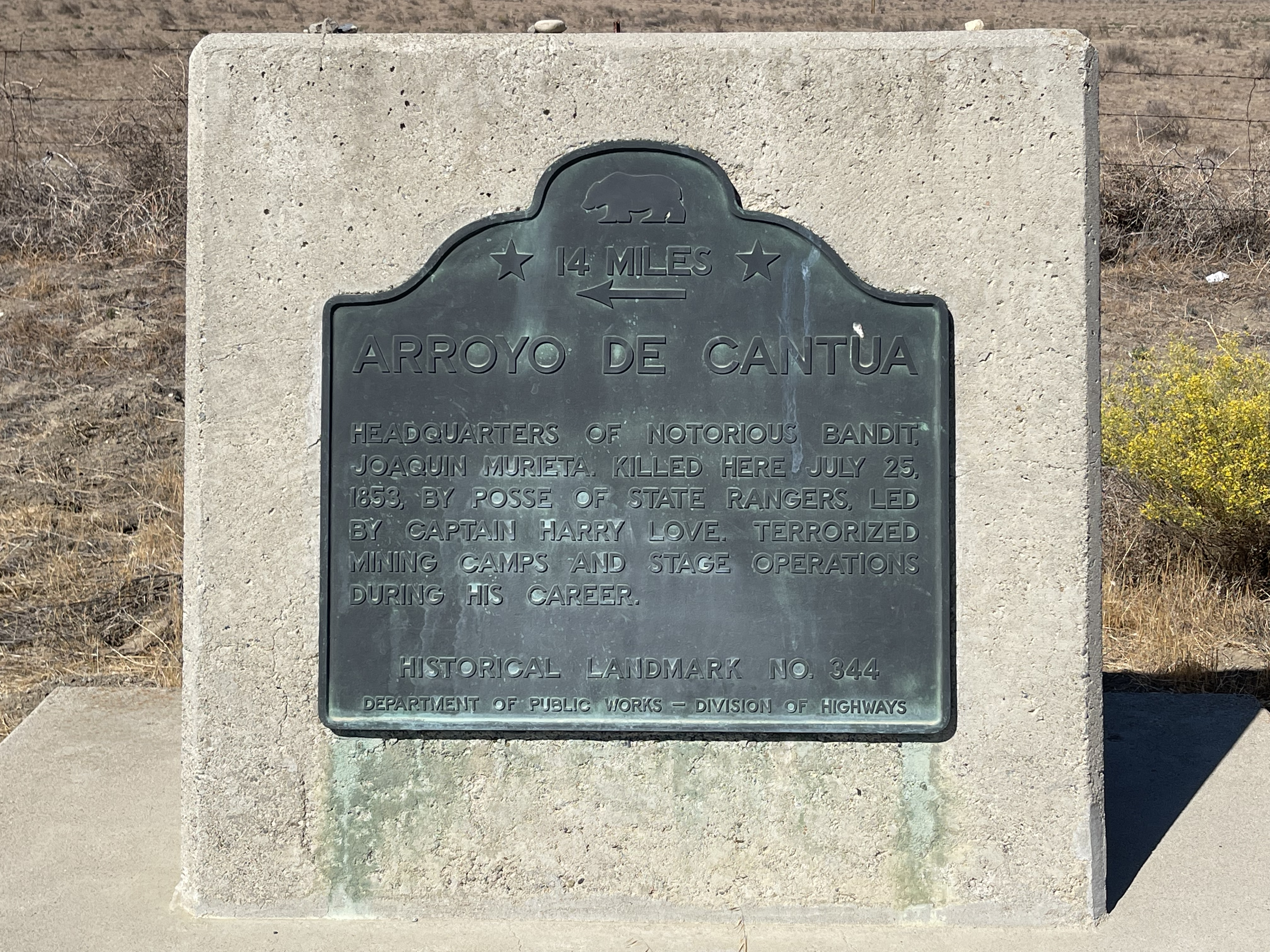
The California Historic Landmark plaque for Arroyo de Cantúa in 2022.

=== Historical Landmark ===
The Arroyo de Cantúa has California Historical Landmark #344, commemorating where California Rangers led by Harry Love were said to have killed Joaquin Murrieta and Three Fingered Jack (Tres Dedos) and capturing two others in 1853. The place was at Murrieta Spring 36°24′34″N 120°24′20″W a spring flowing from the south bank of the Cantúa forming a pool in the arroyo where it emerged from the foot of the western mountains, a mile above where California State Route 33 now crosses Cantua Creek. The spring was located about 100 yards above where the El Camino Viejo crossed the arroyo. Years later wells drilled to provide water for livestock stopped the flow of water from the spring.
