= Cholame Hills =

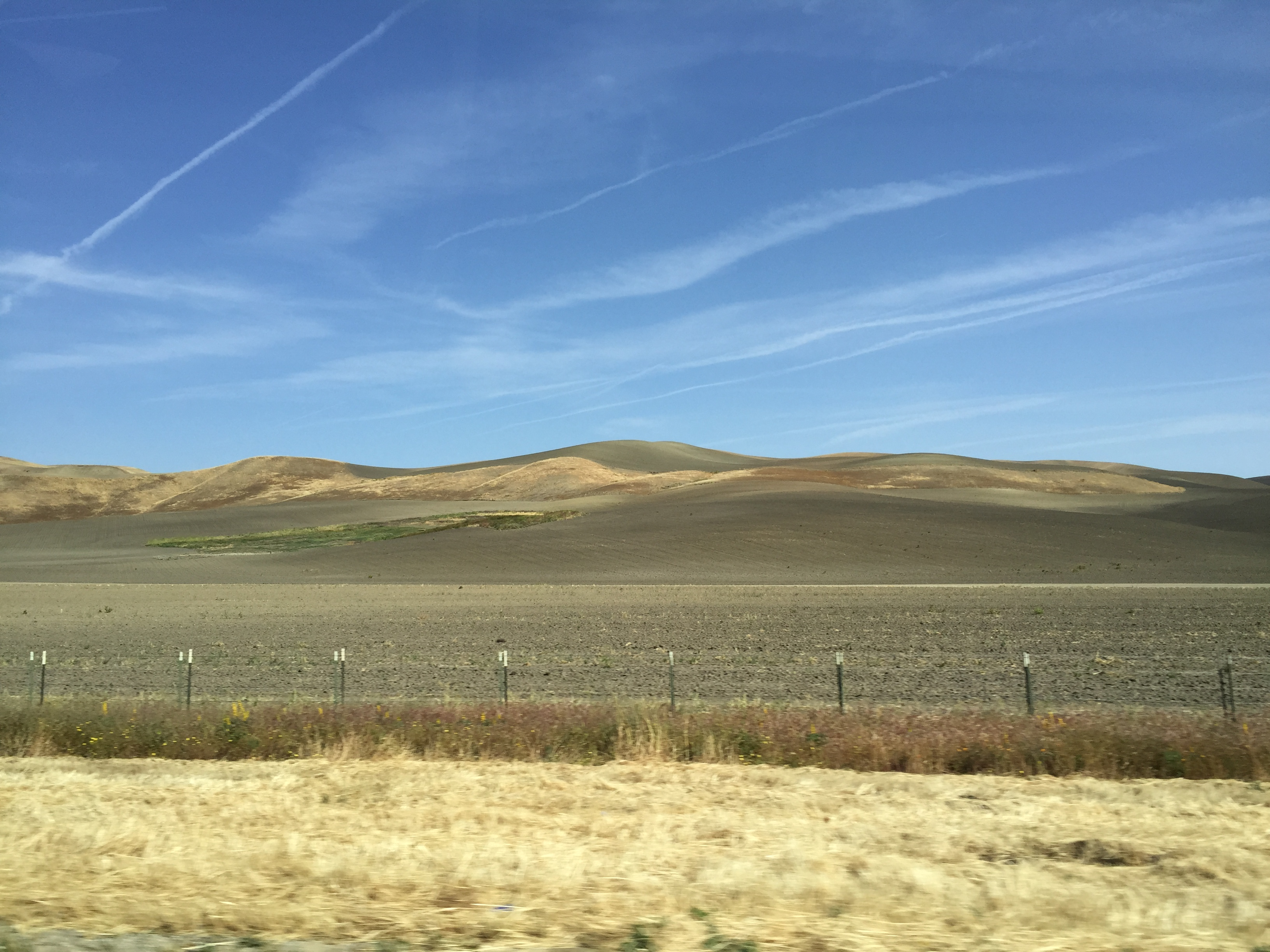
- View of the Cholame Hills from CA 46

Highest point
- Elevation: 675 m (2,215 ft)

Geography
- Location within California Location within the United States
- Country: United States
- State: California
- District: Monterey County
- Range coordinates: 35°49′14″N 120°25′36″W
- Parent range: Temblor Range, California Coast Ranges
- Topo map: USGS Cholame Hills

The Cholame Hills are a low mountain range in extreme southeastern Monterey County, California.

They are a northern extension of the Temblor Range, both of the California Coast Ranges System.

To the south of the range lie California State Route 46 and the town of Cholame, California.

== See also ==
- California Flats Solar Project — proposed for the area
