= Diablo Range =

Mountain range in the California Coastal Ranges

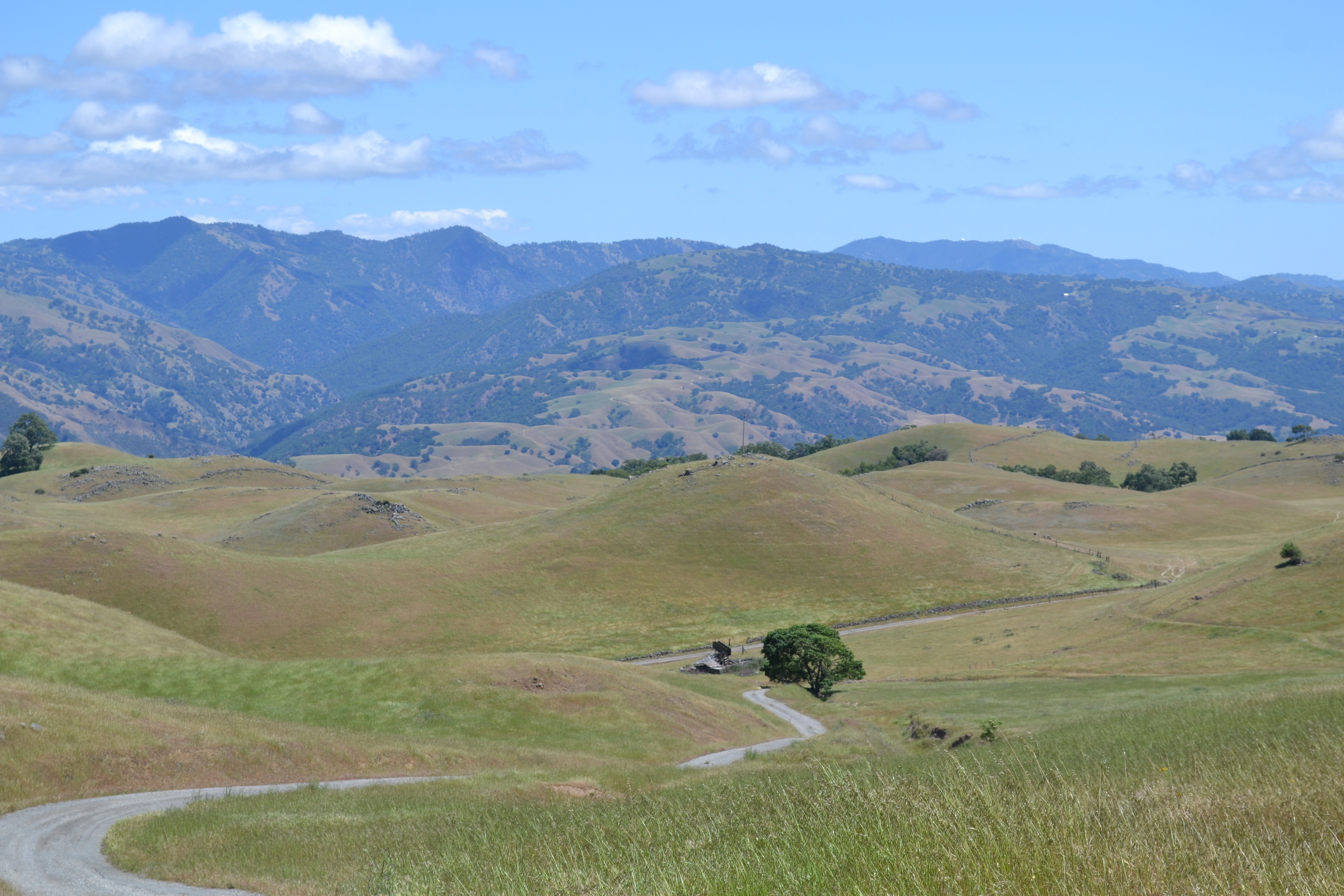
- Mount Hamilton

Highest point
- Elevation: 5,240 ft (1,600 m)

Dimensions
- Length: 180 mi (290 km) north-south from Carquinez Strait to Polonio Pass
- Width: 20 mi (32 km)

Geography
- Location within California
- Country: United States
- State: California
- Region: Central California
- Range coordinates: 36°22′10.844″N 120°38′39.609″W
- Topo map: USGS San Benito Mountain

The Diablo Range is a mountain range in the California Coast Ranges subdivision of the Pacific Coast Ranges in northern California, United States. It stretches from the eastern San Francisco Bay Area at its northern end to the Salinas Valley area at its southern end.

== Geography ==
The Diablo Range extends from the Carquinez Strait in the north to Orchard Peak and Polonio Pass in the south, near the point where State Route 46 crosses over the Coast Ranges at Cholame, as described by the United States Geological Survey (USGS). It is bordered on the northeast by the San Joaquin River, on the southeast by the San Joaquin Valley, on the southwest by the Salinas River, and on the northwest by the Santa Clara Valley and San Francisco Bay. On USGS maps, the "Diablo Range" is shown as the ridgeline which runs between its namesake Mount Diablo southeastward past Mount Hamilton. However, the USGS Geographic Names Information System (GNIS) includes the East Bay Hills in its list of various GPS coordinates for the Diablo Range. Although not formally recognized by USGS GNIS, the East Bay Hills consists of the Briones Hills furthest north, then the Berkeley Hills, the San Leandro Hills centrally, and Walpert Ridge and Pleasanton Ridge to the southwest and southeast, culminating at Alameda Creek/Highway 84.

Geologically, the Diablo Range corresponds to the California Coast Ranges east of the Calaveras Fault in its northern section. For much of its length, it is paralleled by other sections of the California Coast Ranges to the west, the Santa Cruz Mountains across the southern San Francisco Bay and Santa Clara Valley, and the Santa Lucia Range across the Salinas Valley. To the west the north Diablo Range is bounded geologically from the East Bay Hills by the Calaveras Fault. However, ecologically the East Bay Hills are part of the East Bay Hills/Western Diablo Range subregion, which along with the Diablo Range, falls within the Central California Foothills and Coastal Mountains Level III Ecoregion #6.

The range passes through Contra Costa, Alameda, San Joaquin, Santa Clara, Stanislaus, Merced, San Benito, Fresno, Monterey, and Kings Counties, and ends in the northwesternmost extremity of Kern County.

=== Topography ===
Though the average elevation is about 3,000 feet (910 meters), a summit of over 2,300 feet (700 m) is considered high, mainly because the range is mostly rolling grassland and plateaus, punctuated by isolated peaks. Plateaus are usually at about 2,000–3,000 feet (610–910 m). Hills rise to about 1,000 feet (300 m), while foothills such those in the Santa Clara Valley, Livermore Valley and San Joaquin Valley are typically 400–1,000 feet (120–300 m).

Canyons are usually 300–400 feet (91–122 m) deep; valleys are often deeper but less steep-sided. Peaks often have high topographic prominence, as they are surrounded by valleys or lower hills or plateaus. Streams draining the eastern slopes of the Diablo Range include Hospital Creek and Ingram Creek. Stream draining the western slopes include Alameda Creek and Coyote Creek.

=== Peaks ===
The Diablo Range's peaks and ridges are between 2,517–5,241 feet (767–1,597 m) and are distinct landmarks. Mount Diablo (3,849 feet (1,173 m)), San Benito Mountain (5,241 feet (1,597 m)), Mount Hamilton Ridge (4,230–4,260 feet (1,290–1,300 m)), and Mount Stakes (3,804 feet (1,159 m)) are four of the highest peaks in the range.

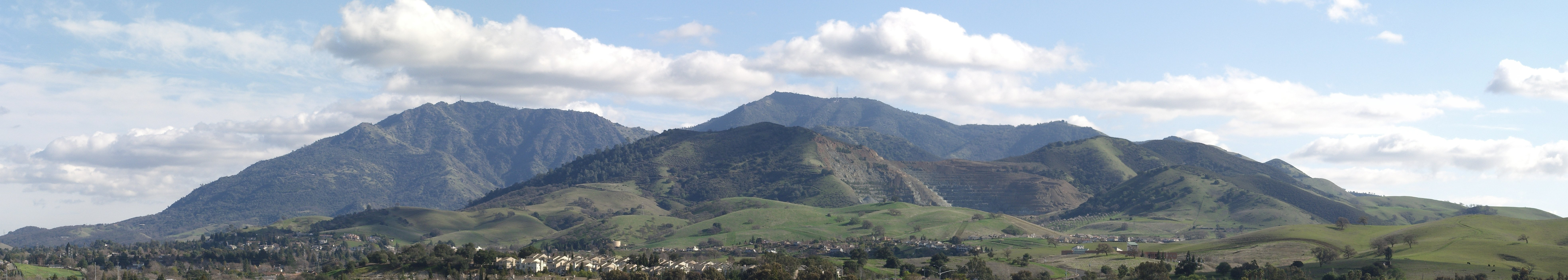
View of Mt. Diablo from Concord. Main peak at right, North Peak at left, Mt. Zion at center (scroll image L/R to view)

== Geology ==
In the Diablo Range, there are sedimentary and extrusive igneous rocks. Specifically basalt, chert, and graywacke sandstone. The igneous rock was formed between 201 and 145 million years ago. The sedimentary rock was formed between 201 and 66 million years ago.

The soil of the Diablo Range consists of serpentine rocks alongside ophiolite. These rocks were formed alongside the original oceanic crust about 165 million years ago through rapid lava cooling. Segments of silica carbonate rocks (altered serpentine) have been located alongside nearby mercury mines.

Much of the Diablo Range is located alongside the Franciscan Complex. Franciscan rocks, including basalt, graywacke, shale, and chert, were formed by the subduction of the oceanic crust during the late Jurassic and early Cretaceous periods. Overlaying Franciscan rocks have undergone metamorphism during the Cretaceous and Eocene eras, resulting in the vertical growth and formation of the range's mountainous slopes.

Over multiple centuries, weathering and erosion have impacted deposits of sedimentary rocks and fossils from the Eocene era and resulted in the formation of unusual rock features and deposits in the Diablo Range.

=== Mining ===
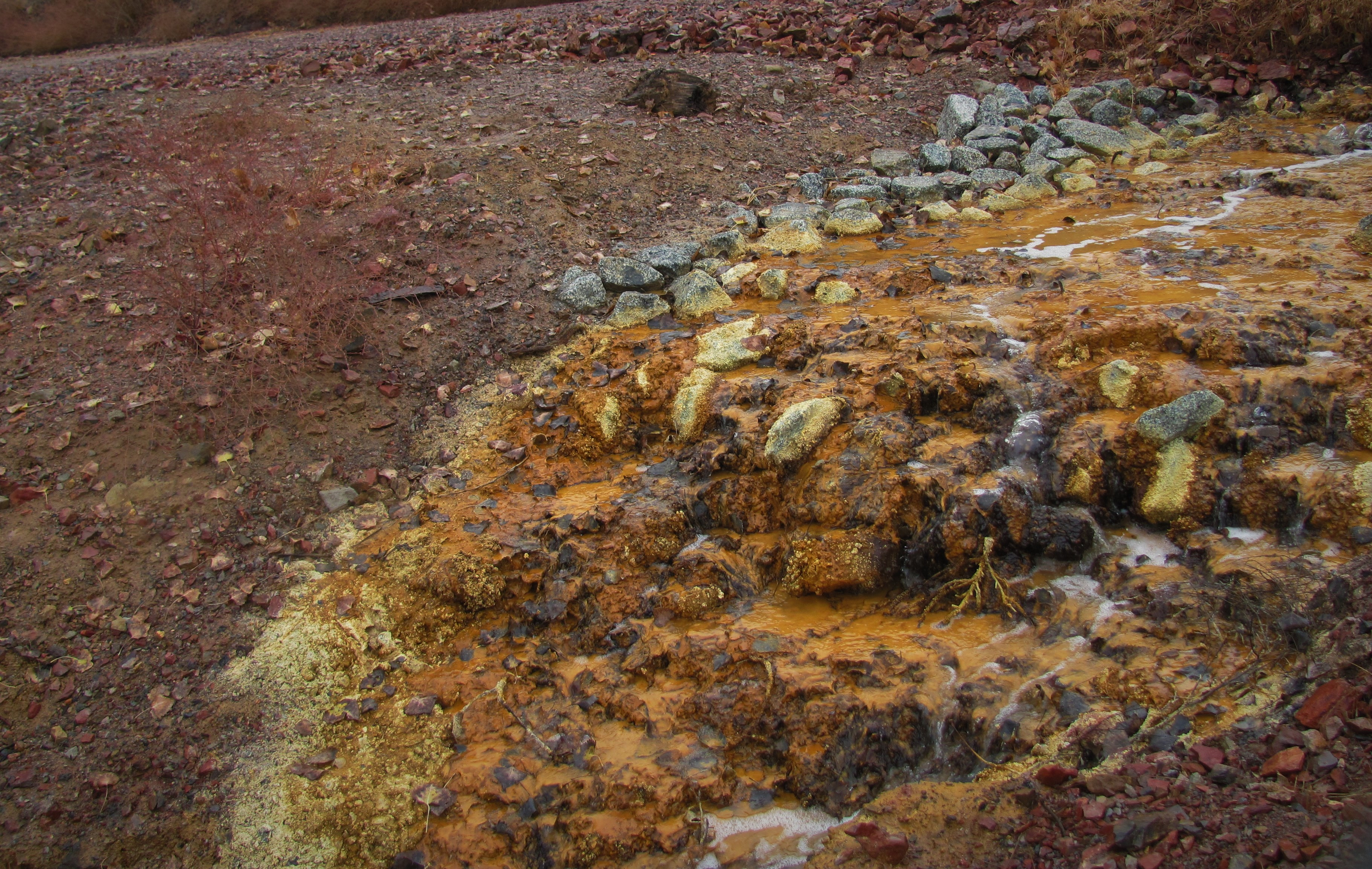
Polluted water spewing from the New Idria Mercury Mine in 2013

Mercury mining deposits are prevalent along much of the Diablo Range. The ore is mined from silica-carbonate rocks, which have a spongey-like formation and are produced in cinnabar and metacinnabar variations. The New Idria Mercury Mine produced much of the nation's mercury resources between 1854 and the early 1970s. Widescale mercury mining facilities in the Diablo Range date back to World War II mercury supply demands, and were later shut down by the latter half of the twentieth century. This mercury mining, most notably from New Idria, has resulted in the contamination of acid mine water into nearby wetlands and water sources, including the Panoche Creek and the San Joaquin River.

Other materials, including copper, travertine, coal, gas, and oil reservoirs, were also mined along the Diablo Range.

== Human elements ==
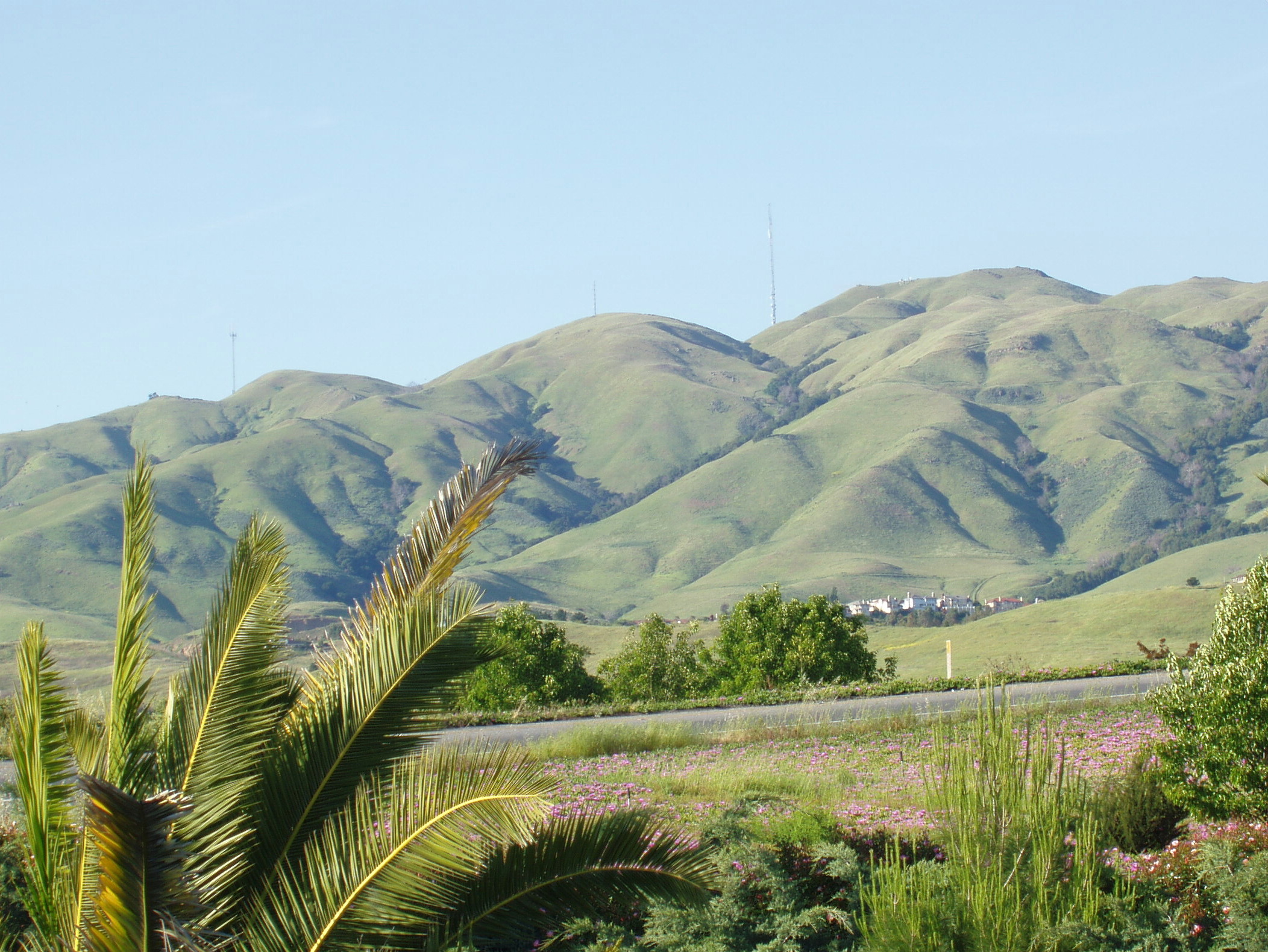
The south edge (mostly Monument Peak) of the Mission Ridge as seen from Milpitas.

The Diablo Range is paralleled for much of its distance by U.S. Route 101 to the west and by I-5 to the east. Major routes of travel through the range include:

- North of the range
  - BNSF Railway/Gold Runner
- Willow Pass
  - State Route 4
  - BART Yellow Line
- Altamont Pass
  - Union Pacific Railroad/Altamont Corridor Express
  - I-580
- Sunol Valley
  - State Route 84
  - I-680
- Patterson Pass
- Corral Hollow Pass
- Mount Hamilton
  - State Route 130
- Pacheco Pass
  - State Route 152
  - Future California High-Speed Rail
- Panoche Pass
- State Route 198
- Cottonwood Pass (State Route 41)
- Polonio Pass (State Route 46)

A sparsely used gravel road is the highest road in the range, with its highest point being on San Benito Mountain at over 5,000 feet.

The Diablo Range is largely unpopulated outside of the San Francisco Bay Area. Major nearby communities include, Antioch, Pittsburg, Concord, Walnut Creek, Alamo, Danville, San Ramon, Pleasanton, Livermore, Fremont, Milpitas, San Jose, Morgan Hill, and Gilroy and the Central Valley city of Tracy. South of Pacheco Pass, the only major nearby communities (those with a population over 15,000) are Los Banos, and Hollister. The small town of Coalinga may also be notable for its location on State Route 198, one of the few routes through the mountains. Also the town of Kettleman City is also on State Route 41, another route that crosses the mountains. Towns west of the range south of Gilroy include: Salinas, King City, and Paso Robles.

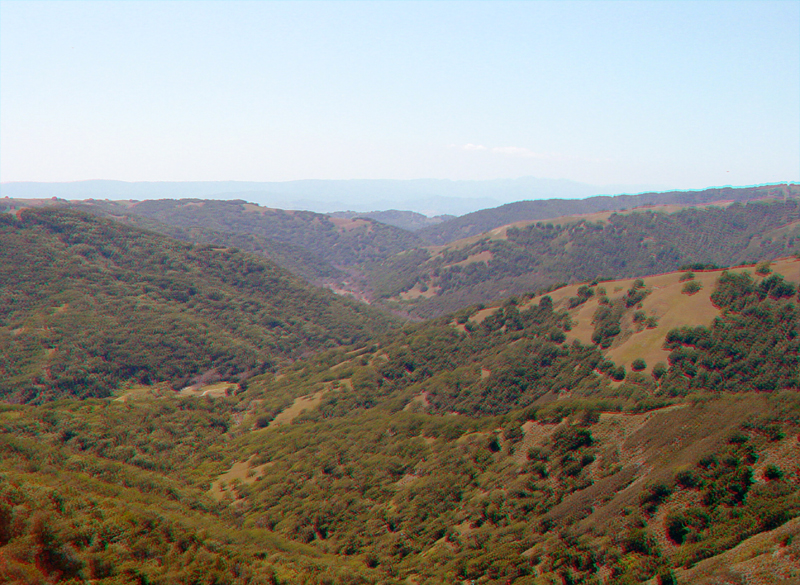
The southern end of Henry W. Coe State Park, near Gilroy

=== Protected areas ===
Most of the range consists of private ranchland, limiting recreational use. However, the range does contain several areas of parkland, including Mount Diablo State Park, Alum Rock Park, Grant Ranch Park, Henry W. Coe State Park, Laguna Mountain Recreation Area, and the BLM's Clear Creek Management Area. In addition, some private land is held in conservation easements by the California Rangeland Trust.

== Natural history ==
Since the range lies around 10–50 miles (16–80 kilometers) inland from the ocean, and other coastal ranges like the Santa Lucia Range and the Santa Cruz Mountains block incoming moisture, the range gets little precipitation. In addition, the average elevation of 3,000 feet (910 m) is not high enough to catch most of the incoming moisture at higher altitudes.

Winters are mild with moderate rainfall, but summers are very dry and hot. Areas above 2,500 feet (762 m) get light to moderate snow in the winter, especially at the highest point, the 5,241 ft (1,597 m) San Benito Mountain in the remote southeastern section of the range. However, though sites at the lower end get annual snowfall, it is typically light and melts too fast to be noticed. Once or twice a decade there is seriously deep and long lasting snowfall.

Mercury contamination near the southern end of the range is an ongoing problem, due to the New Idria quicksilver mines, which stopped production in the 1970s. Heavy mercury contamination has been documented in the San Carlos and Silver Creeks, which flow into Panoche Creek, and thence into the San Joaquin River. This has resulted in mercury contamination all the way downstream to the San Francisco Bay. Silver and San Carlos creeks provide a wetland environment in an otherwise arid region and are important for the ecology of the region. Mercury waste from calcine furnaces has polluted much of these abandoned mines and the biodiversity of the Diablo Range environment. In recent years, this contamination has been acknowledged by federal and state authorities and has been the focus of clean-up initiatives. As of 2011, New Idria has been listed as a Superfund site and scheduled for cleanup.

Energy development, suburbanization, and community projects have threatened the biodiversity of the Diablo Range. Notably, the encroachment of solar farms and wind turbines endangers the population of many rare species of flora and fauna. This biodiversity is a direct effect of the range's serpentine soil and chaparral climate.

=== Flora ===
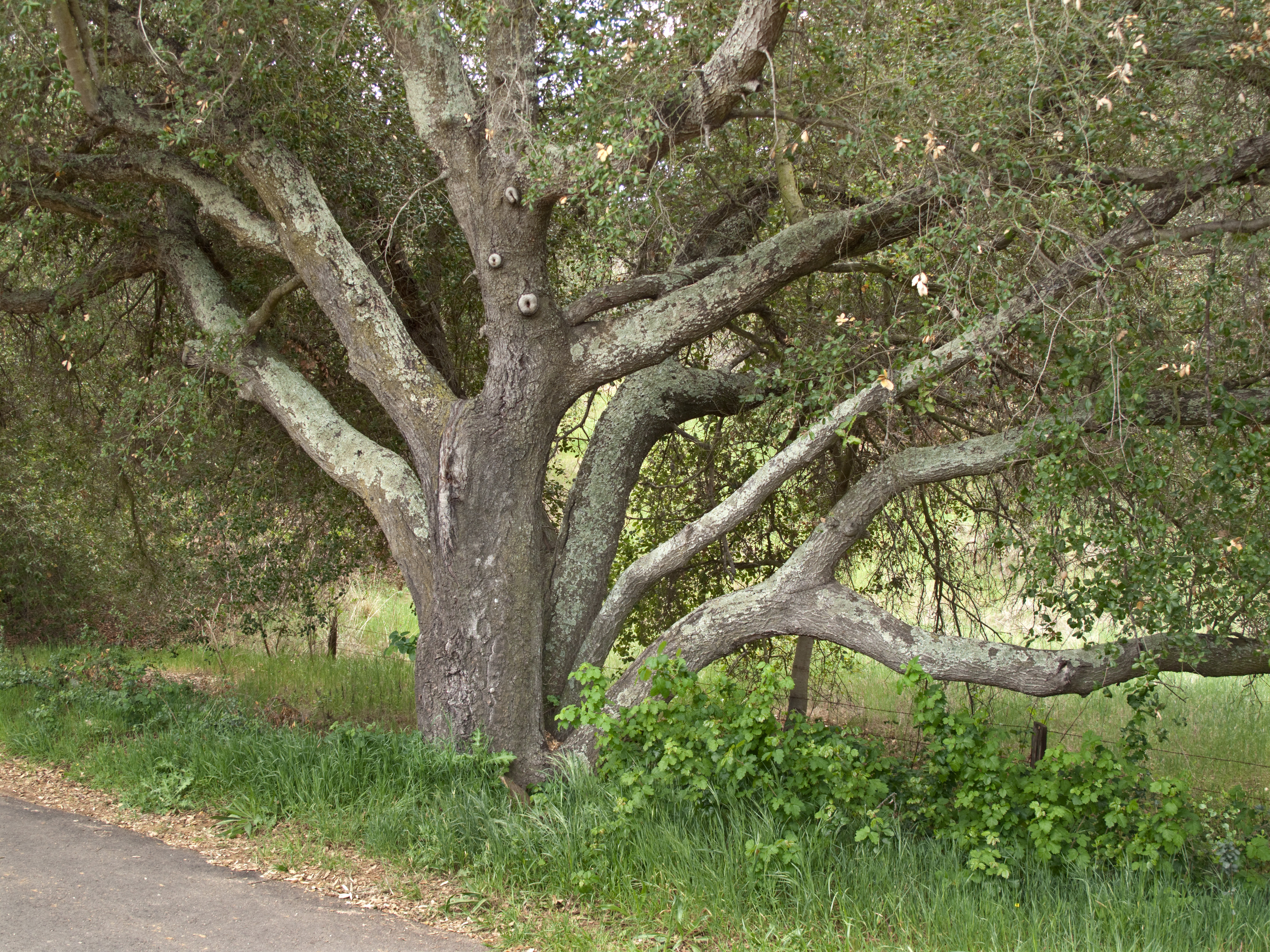
Coast Live Oak

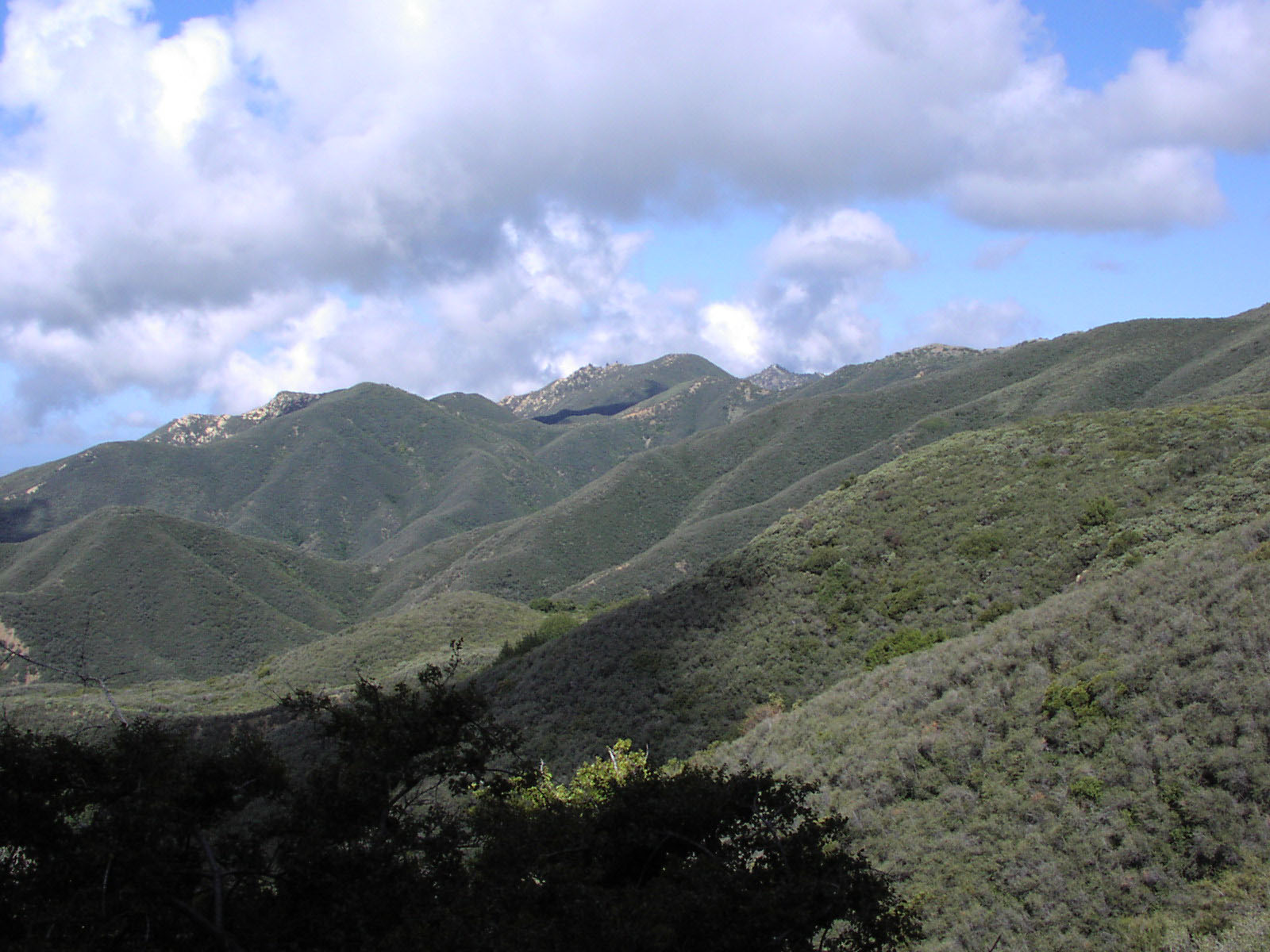
Chaparral covers most of the Diablo Range

The Diablo Range is part of the California interior chaparral and woodlands ecoregion. It is covered mostly by chaparral and California oak woodland communities, with stands of closed-cone pine forests appearing above 4,000 feet (1,219 m). The native bunch grass savanna has been predominantly replaced by annual Mediterranean grasses, except in some rare habitat fragments. The understory is dominated with nonnative invasives. Blooming in spring are such plants as Viola pedunculata, Dodecatheon pulchellum, Fritillaria liliacea, and Ribes malvaceum, which can be viewed in the Blue Oak Ranch Reserve.

The range's riparian zones have such trees as bigleaf maple (Acer macrophyllum), white alder (Alnus rhombifolia), California bay (Umbellularia californica), and California sycamore (Platanus racemosa).

The most common trees are coast live oak (Quercus agrifolia) and blue oak (Quercus douglasii), with the largest blue oak growing in Alameda County. There are also good populations of California buckeye (Aesculus californica), and California black oak (Quercus kelloggii). The gray pine (Pinus sabiniana) and rarer Coulter pine (Pinus coulteri) can be found at all elevations, especially between 800–3,000 feet (240–910 m). Coulter pine reaches its northern limit on northern of Mt. Diablo. The conifers at higher elevations in the Diablo Range include knobcone pine (Pinus attenuata), Jeffrey pine (Pinus jeffreyi) and ponderosa pine (Pinus ponderosa).

=== Fauna ===
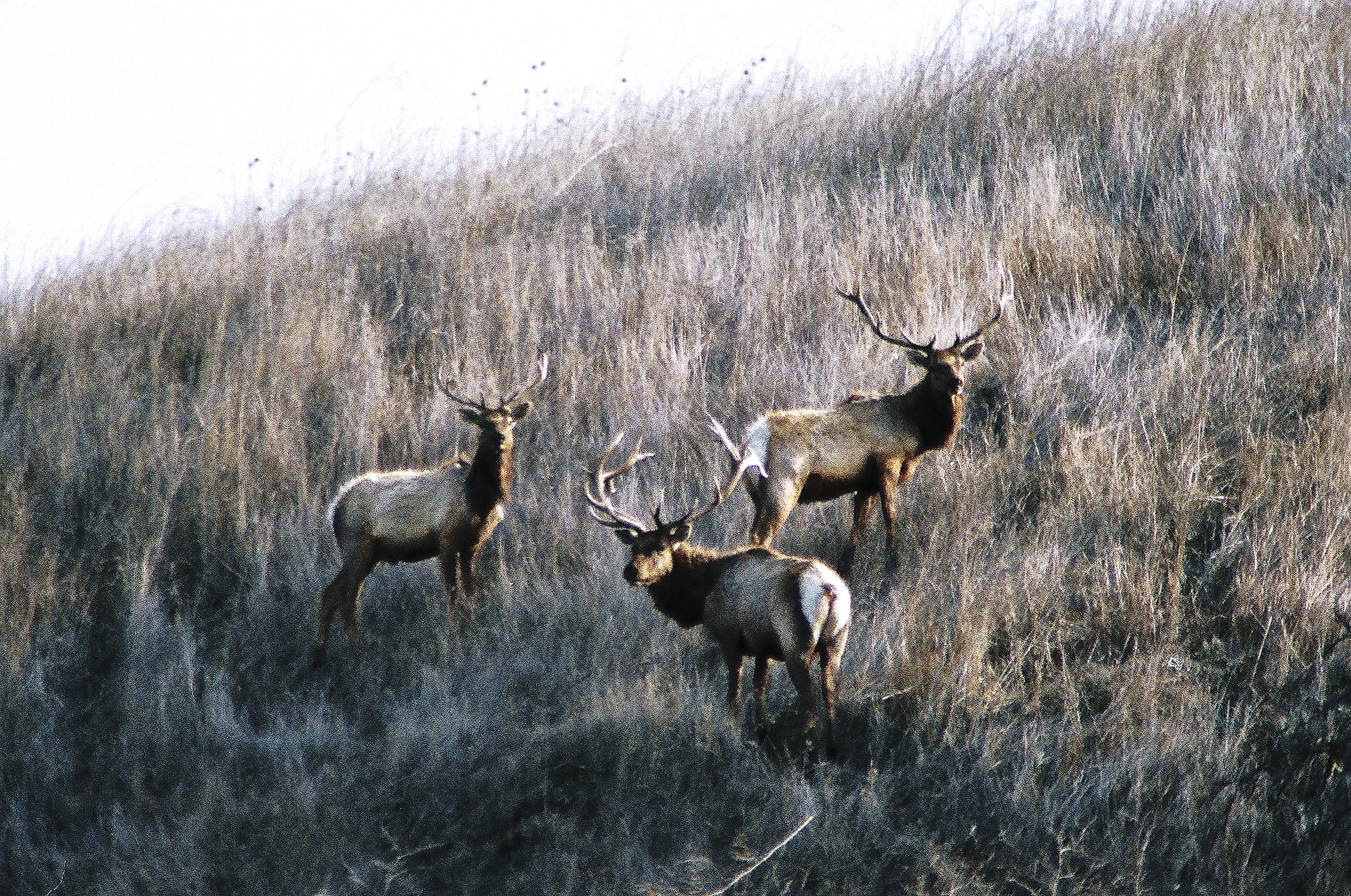
Three tule elk in Basking Ridge Park just north of U.S. Highway 101, which is a barrier to elk migration to the Coast Range

The Diablo Range attracts far more raptors than coastal forests, such as red-tailed hawks. Golden eagle nesting sites are found in the Diablo Range, reaching their highest density in southern Alameda County.

The Bay checkerspot butterfly, a federally listed threatened species, has habitat in the Range, especially at Mount Diablo. The California tiger salamander (Ambystoma californiense), also a federally threatened species and a vulnerable species of amphibian native to Northern California, lives in ponds in the range. The northern Pacific rattlesnake is thriving, as are many ground squirrels, hares, and various species of native and nonnative rodents.

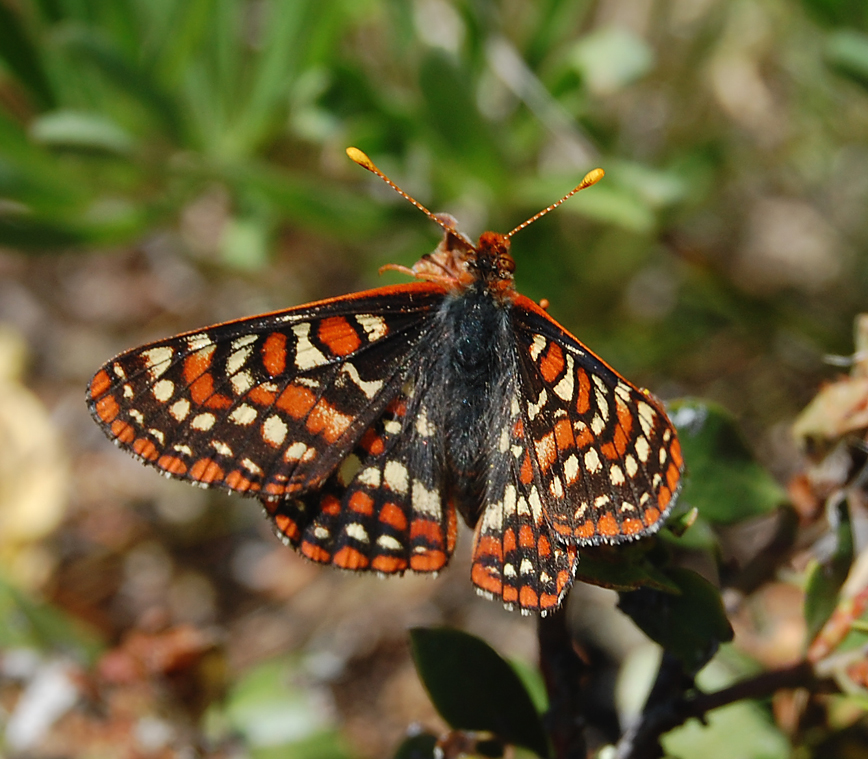
Bay checkerspot butterflies are an endangered species in the Diablo Range

Tule elk (Cervus canadensis ssp. nannodes) were restored to Mount Hamilton between 1978–1981 and are slowly recovering in several small herds in Santa Clara and Alameda Counties. See Mount Hamilton elk recovery. Black-tailed deer are abundant. Pronghorn, grizzly bears, and wolves were extirpated in the 1800s. There still are numerous coyotes and some of the more vital mountain lion populations in the state. There are excellent populations of bobcats and gray foxes, which depend on the chaparral habitat.

A species of millipede, Illacme plenipes, is endemic to the southern Diablo Range. First described in 1926, then not seen again until 2005, the species has more legs than any other species of millipede, with one specimen having 750.

== Indigenous habitation ==
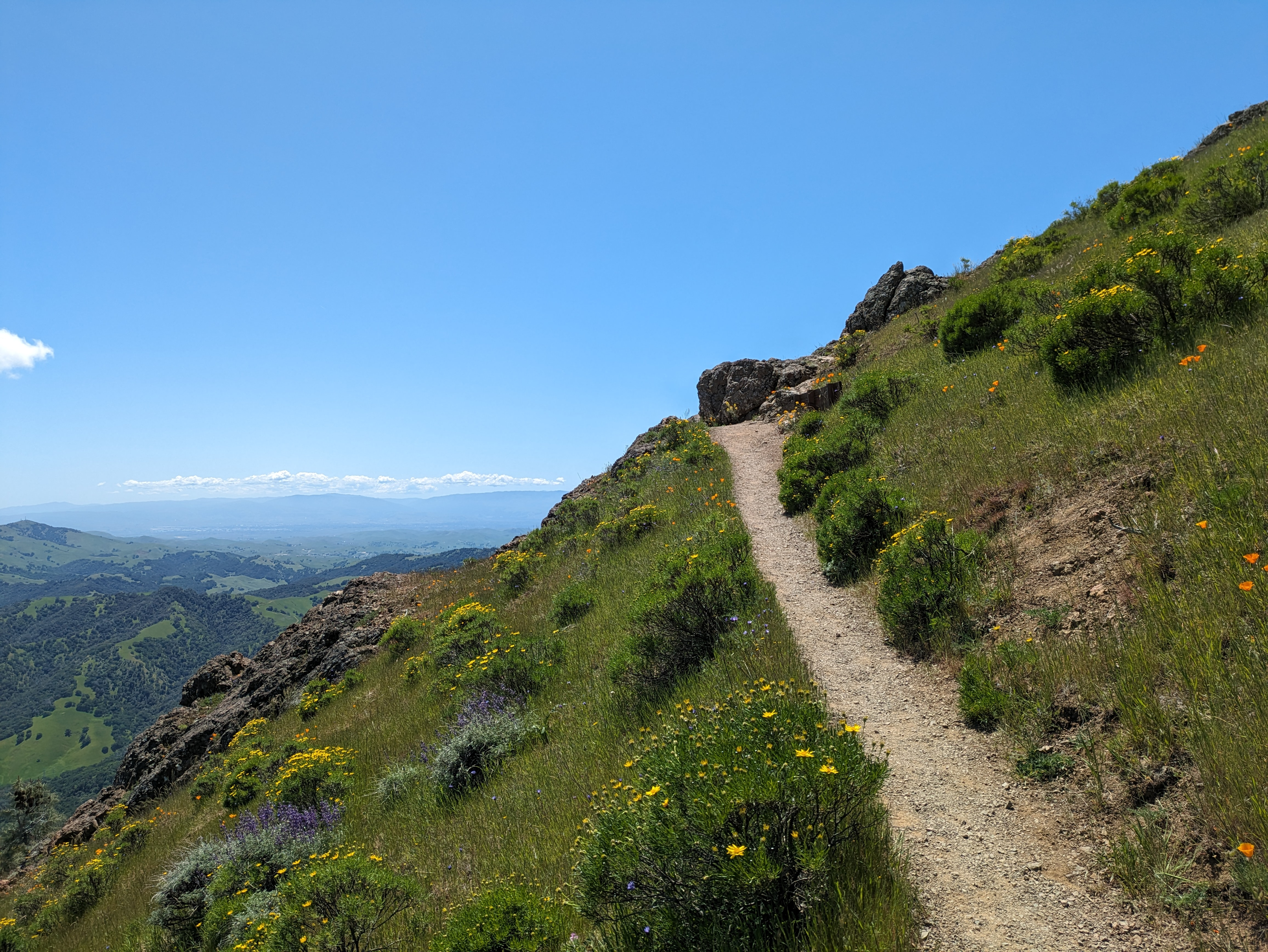
Mt. Diablo surrounded by California golden violets

Many indigenous groups have settled alongside the Diablo Range, including the Ohlone, Yokuts, Miwok, Volvon, Muwekma, Tamien Nation, Amah Mutsen, Chalon, and Salinan. These indigenous communities maintained a sacred connection to the mountain range and local topography. Pre-colonial contact, these Native American communities preserved and respected their surrounding land, which had granted life. Specifically, Mount Diablo stood as a sacred symbol for multiple generations, representing the relationship between humans and their local environment. Multiple cultural artifacts of ceremonial importance have been unearthed and excavated from protected state parks within the Diablo Range.

In the early 1800s, the Volvon were relocated to Spanish Mission systems. Their removal greatly impacted the local Diablo Range environment and established biodiversity. The Volvon resisted Spanish settlement throughout the 1820s, eventually declining in population due to epidemics.

== See also ==
- Mountain ranges of the San Francisco Bay Area
- Rancho Cañada de Pala
- Rancho Santa Teresa
