= Temblor Range =

Mountain range in the southern California Coastal Ranges

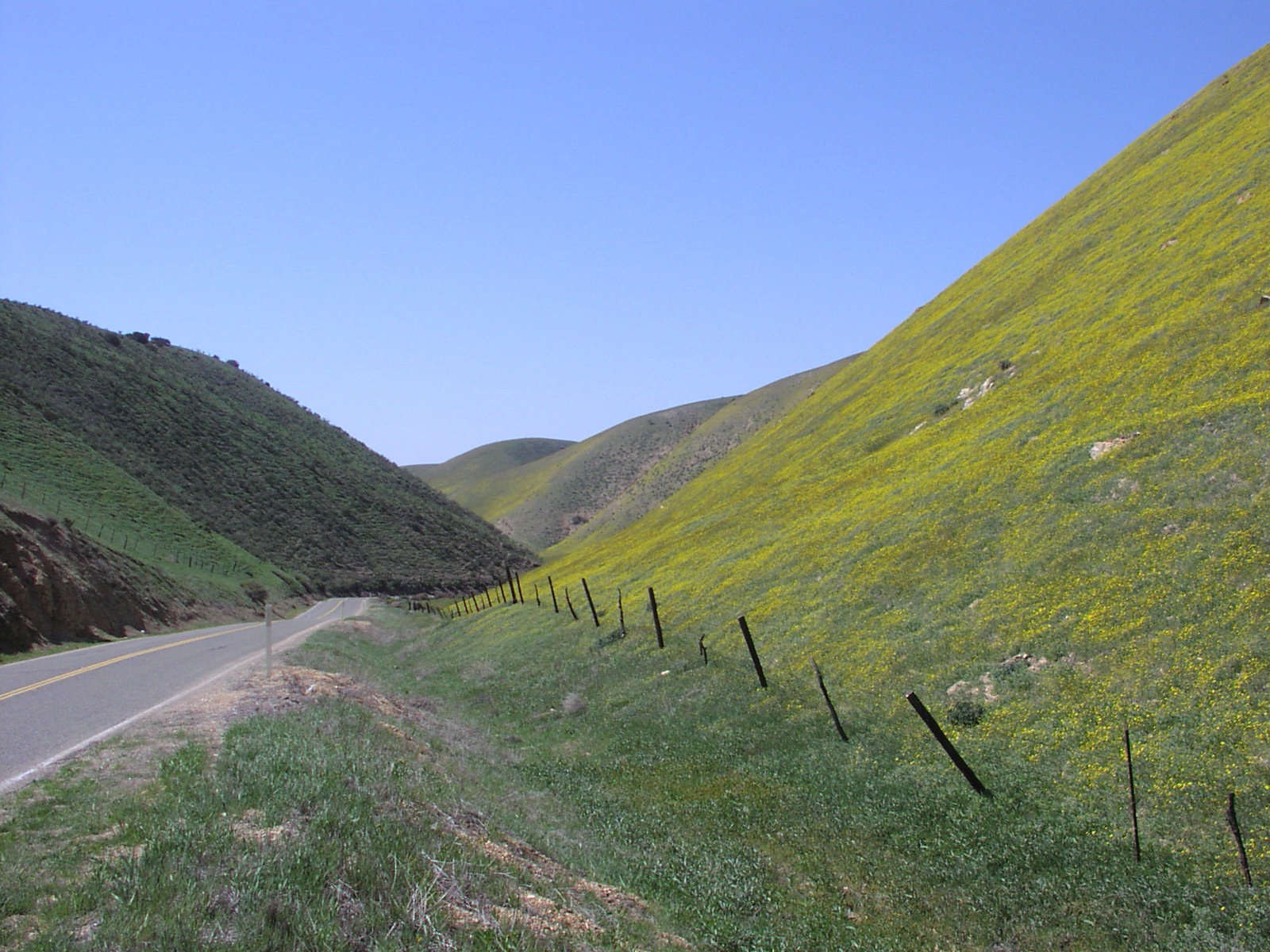
- Temblor Mountains in spring; view from near State Route 58 summit

Highest point
- Elevation: 4,331 ft (1,320 m)

Geography
- Location within California
- Country: United States
- State: California
- District(s): San Luis Obispo County & Kern County
- Range coordinates: 35°19′25.877″N 119°47′48.469″W
- Parent range: California Coast Ranges
- Borders on: San Emigdio Mountains and Diablo Range
- Topo map: USGS McKittrick Summit
- Biome: California interior chaparral and woodlands

The Temblor Range is a mountain range within the California Coast Ranges, at the southwestern extremity of the San Joaquin Valley in California in the United States. It runs in a northwest-southeasterly direction along the borders of Kern County and San Luis Obispo County. The name of the range is from Spanish temblor meaning "tremor", referring to earthquakes. The San Andreas Fault Zone runs parallel to the range at the base of its western slope, on the eastern side of the Carrizo Plain, while the Antelope Plain, location of the enormous Midway Sunset, South Belridge, and Cymric oil fields, lies to the northeast.

Peaks within the Temblor Range average about 3,500 ft (1,100 m) above sea level. The highest point is McKittrick Summit at 4,331 ft (1,320 m), located in the center of the range about 35 mi (56 km) west of Bakersfield. State Route 58 crosses the range nearby at 3,750 ft (1,140 m) above sea level. The lowest crossing of the range is Polonio Pass on State Route 46 at 1,750 ft (530 m), which also separates it from the Diablo Range to the north.

== Origin and composition ==
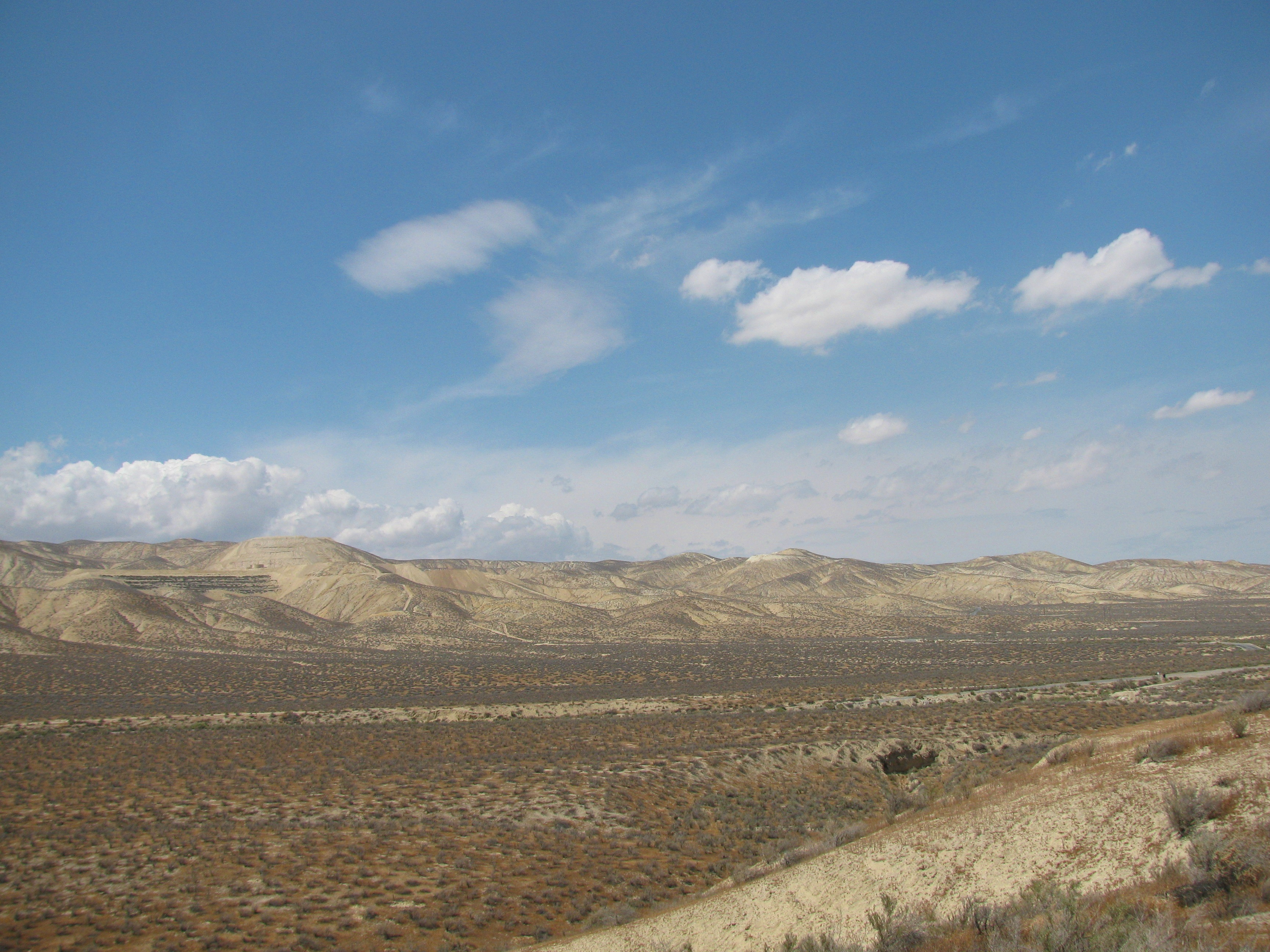
Southern extreme of the range, looking north, from near Maricopa.

The Temblor Range and surrounding region contains extensive outcrops of the Monterey Formation (Miocene age, about 20 to 9 million years). Rocks from the Monterey formation consist mostly of silicate shales and porcellanite (silica derived from fossil plankton in an intermediate to deep-water marine setting). Fossils and sediments from the Monterey Formation show that the Carrizo Plain region was a marine basin with shallow to intermediate depths (marine waters covered the southern San Joaquin Valley region). Marine sediments younger than about 9 million years are not preserved in the Carrizo Plain National Monument area, but they occur throughout the Kettleman Hills region (about 60 miles (97 km) north of the park). The Pliocene-age Etchegoin Formation contains marine fossils to about 4 million years old. Fossils of the Etchegoin Formation are supporting evidence that the Coast Ranges and the Temblor Range are young, having been uplifted mostly during the Pleistocene Epoch (or Quaternary Period) in the past several million years. Much of that ongoing uplift is due to tectonics associated with the San Andreas Fault and other fault systems in the region.

During the Pleistocene, sometime more recently than 1.8 million years ago, an enormous block of the Temblor Range – a swath of Monterey shale more than six miles (9.7 km) long, a mile across, and over 2,000 feet (610 m) thick, about three cubic miles of rock in all – slid down the northeastern side of the range, covering a distance of approximately three miles and descending 2,000 feet (610 m). This mass movement completely covered the McKittrick Oil Field, giving it a highly unusual geology for an oil field, as the petroleum deposits in most oil fields are in structural or stratigraphic traps; this field is capped by an enormous mass of rock that moved off of the adjacent mountain range. The Temblor Range is delineated from the San Emigdio Mountains and the Santa Ynez Mountains by State Route 166 in Maricopa. This is the Temblor Range's southern end. The Temblor Range is delineated from the Diablo Range by Polonio Pass and State Route 46, connecting the Central Valley and the Central Coast. This is the range's northern end near Cholame.

== Temblor Recreation Area ==
The Temblor Recreation Area is less than 3 miles Southwest of Taft, California. Although there are numerous unofficial routes into the area, legal public access is currently limited.
