= Death of James Dean =

1955 car crash that killed American actor

- Photograph of Dean with his Porsche 550, named "Little Bastard", a few hours before his death
- Date: September 30, 1955
- Location: At the junction of SR 46 and SR 41 near Cholame, California; 35°44′04″N 120°17′04″W
- Cause: Car crash
- Deaths: James Dean
- Injuries: Rolf Wütherich; Donald Turnupseed

American actor James Dean was killed at the age of 24 in an auto accident on September 30, 1955, near Cholame, California. He had previously competed in several auto racing events, and was traveling to a sports car racing competition in Salinas, California, when he was involved in a car crash at the junction of U.S. Route 466 (later SR 46) and SR 41.

== Racing career background ==
In April 1954, after securing the co-starring role of Cal Trask in East of Eden, James Dean purchased a 1955 Triumph Tiger T110 650 cc motorcycle and, later, a used red 1953 MG TD sports car. In March 1955, Dean traded the MG for a new 1955 Porsche Speedster purchased from Competition Motors in Hollywood, California. He traded the Triumph T110 for a 1955 Triumph TR5 Trophy three days after filming wrapped on East of Eden. Just before filming began on Rebel Without a Cause, Dean competed in the Palm Springs Road Races with the Speedster on March 26–27. He finished first overall in Saturday's novice class, and second overall in the Sunday main event. Dean also raced the Speedster at Bakersfield on May 1–2, finishing first in class and third overall. His final race with the Speedster was at Santa Barbara on Memorial Day, May 30, where he started in the eighteenth position, working his way up to fourth before over-revving his engine and blowing a piston. He did not finish the race.

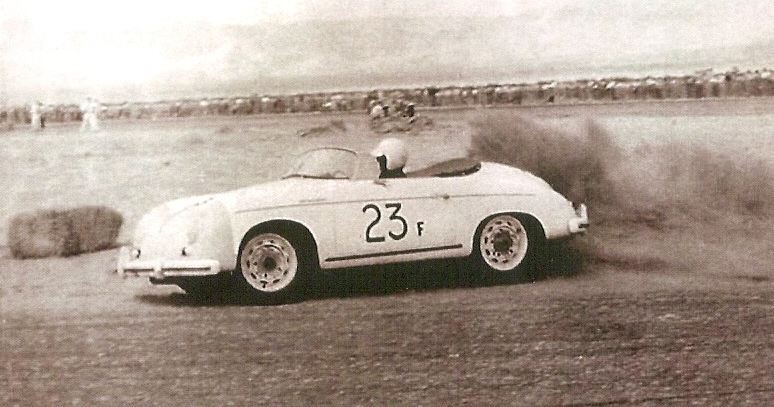
Dean and his Porsche Speedster 23F at Palm Springs Races, March 1955

During the filming of Giant from June through mid-September, Warner Brothers had barred Dean from all racing activities. In July, Dean put down a deposit on a new Lotus Mark IX sports racer with Jay Chamberlain, a dealer in Burbank. Dean was told that the Lotus delivery would be delayed until autumn. On September 21, as Dean was finishing Giant, he suddenly traded in his Speedster at Competition Motors for a new, more powerful and faster 1955 Porsche 550 Spyder and entered the upcoming Salinas Road Race event scheduled for October 1–2. He also purchased a new 1955 Ford Country Squire station wagon to use for towing the "Little Bastard" to and from the races on an open wheel car trailer.

According to Lee Raskin, Porsche historian and author of James Dean: At Speed, Dean asked custom car painter and pinstriper Dean Jeffries to paint "Little Bastard" on the car:

Dean Jeffries, who had a paint shop next to [George] Barris, did the customizing work which consisted of: painting '130' in black non-permanent paint on the front hood, doors and rear deck lid. He also painted "Little Bastard" in script across the rear cowling. The red leather bucket seats and red tail stripes were original. The tail stripes were painted by the Stuttgart factory, which was customary on the Spyders for racing ID.

Purportedly, Dean had been given the nickname "Little Bastard" by Bill Hickman, a Warner Bros. stunt driver whom Dean befriended. Hickman was part of Dean's group driving to the Salinas Road Races on September 30, 1955. Hickman says he called Dean "little bastard", and Dean called Hickman "big bastard". Another version of the "Little Bastard" origin – corroborated by two of Dean's close friends, Phil Stern and Lew Bracker – is that Warner Bros. president Jack L. Warner had once referred to Dean as a little bastard after he refused to vacate his temporary East of Eden trailer on the studio's lot. And Dean wanted to get "even" with Warner by naming his race car "Little Bastard" and defiantly show that despite the racing ban during all filming, he would be racing the "Little Bastard" in between projects.

== Car crash ==
1 Dean leaves the Hollywood Ranch Market near Vine Street and Fountain Avenue in Hollywood
2 Dean stops at a gas station on Ventura and Beverly Glen Blvds. in Sherman Oaks
3 Dean is pulled over for speeding in Mettler
4 Dean uses SR 166/SR 33, passing through Maricopa
5 Dean stops in Blackwells Corner
6 Crash site at the junction of SR 46 and SR 41
7 Paso Robles, intended stop for dinner
8 Salinas, intended destination

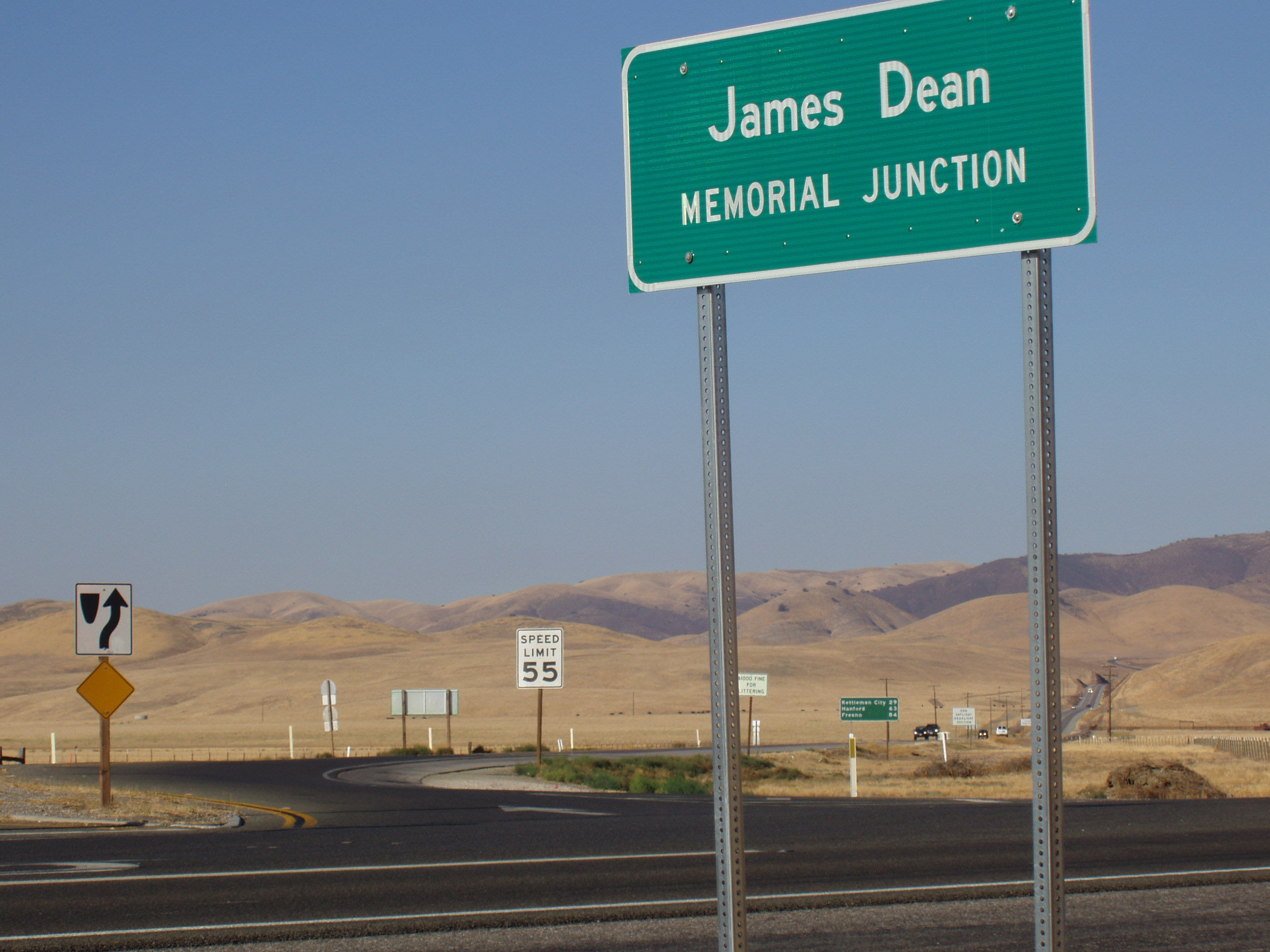
Junction of SR 46 (former US 466) and SR 41 as it looked in 2007

On September 30, 1955, Dean and his Porsche factory-trained mechanic, Rolf Wütherich, were at Competition Motors in Hollywood preparing the "Little Bastard" for the weekend sports car races at Salinas. Dean originally intended to tow the Porsche behind his 1955 Ford Country Squire station wagon, driven by Hickman and accompanied by professional photographer Sanford H. Roth, who was planning a photo story about Dean at the races for Collier's magazine. Because the Spyder had not yet been driven enough miles to qualify for the race, Wütherich recommended that Dean drive it to Salinas to accrue more time behind the wheel. The group had coffee and donuts at the Hollywood Ranch Market on Vine Street across from Competition Motors before leaving around 1:15 p.m. PST. They stopped for gas at a Mobil station on Ventura Boulevard at Beverly Glen Boulevard in Sherman Oaks at around 2:00 p.m. They then headed north on the Golden State Highway (US 99, later part of Interstate 5 (Note: Note that the West Side Freeway segment of Interstate 5 through the Central Valley from Wheeler Ridge north to Sacramento, bypassing Mettler and Bakersfield to the west, was not built until the 1970s.)) and then through Grapevine toward Bakersfield.

At 3:30 p.m, Dean was stopped by California Highway Patrol (CHP) officer Otie V. Hunter at Mettler Station, south of Bakersfield, for driving 65 mph (105 km/h) in a 55 mph (89 km/h) zone. Hickman, following the Spyder in the Ford Country Squire with the trailer, was also ticketed for driving 20 mph (32 km/h) over the limit, as the speed limit for vehicles towing a trailer was 45 mph (72 km/h). After receiving the citations, Dean and Hickman headed west onto SR 166/SR 33 to avoid Bakersfield's slow 25 mph (40 km/h) downtown district. SR 166/SR 33 was a known shortcut for sports car drivers traveling to Salinas, called "the racer's road", which led to Blackwells Corner at US 466 (later SR 46). However, Dean biographer and expert Warren Beath disagrees with this account, citing Wütherich's inquest deposition stating that they had driven through Bakersfield and turned left on US 466. Beath, who lives in Bakersfield, emphasizes that SR 99 does not traverse downtown Bakersfield but instead skirts the city on the east side. In Hunter's testimony, he stated that Dean continued on to Bakersfield.

At Blackwells Corner, Dean stopped briefly for refreshments and met fellow racers Lance Reventlow and Bruce Kessler, who were also driving to Salinas in Reventlow's Mercedes-Benz 300 SL coupe. As Reventlow and Kessler were leaving, they and Dean's group agreed to meet for dinner in Paso Robles.

At approximately 5:15 p.m., Dean and Hickman left Blackwells Corner, driving west on US 466 toward Paso Robles, approximately 60 miles (97 km) away. Dean accelerated in the Spyder and left the Ford station wagon far behind. Further along on US 466, Dean crested Polonio Pass and headed down the long Antelope Grade, passing cars along the way toward the junction of US 466 and SR 41.

At approximately 5:45 p.m., a two-tone black and white 1950 Ford Tudor was headed east on US 466, just west of the junction near Shandon. Its driver, 23-year-old Navy veteran and Cal Poly student Donald Turnupseed, turned left onto SR 41 headed north toward Fresno. As Turnupseed's Ford crossed the center line, Dean—clearly recognizing the imminent crash—tried to steer the Spyder in a "side-stepping" racing maneuver, but with insufficient time and space, the two cars collided almost head-on. Witness John Robert White reported that the Spyder smashed into the ground two or three times in cartwheels and landed in a gully beside the shoulder of the road, northwest of the junction. The velocity of the impact sent the much heavier Ford broad-sliding 39 feet (12 m) down US 466 in the opposing lane. The collision was witnessed by several people who stopped to help. A woman with nursing experience attended to Dean and detected a weak pulse in his neck.

CHP captain Ernest Tripke and corporal Ronald Nelson were called to the scene. Before Tripke and Nelson arrived, Dean had been extricated from the Spyder's mangled wreckage, his left foot having been crushed between the clutch pedal and the brake pedal. He was critically injured because his vehicle had absorbed the brunt of the crash, and he suffered a broken neck and massive internal and external injuries. Hickman and Roth arrived at the scene approximately ten minutes after the crash, and Hickman assisted in the extrication of Dean from the wreckage. Nelson witnessed Dean, unconscious and dying, as he was placed into an ambulance and Wütherich, who had been thrown from the Spyder, lying nearly unconscious on the shoulder of the road next to the wrecked vehicle.

Dean and Wütherich were taken in the same ambulance to the Paso Robles War Memorial Hospital, 28 miles (45 km) away. Dean was pronounced dead on arrival at 6:20 p.m. by the attending emergency room physician, Robert Bossert. The cause of death listed on Dean's death certificate is listed as a broken neck, multiple fractures of the upper and lower jaw, both arms broken and internal injuries. Beath wrote that Dean had died in the arms of his friend Hickman. Despite reports that Dean had been driving approximately 85 mph (137 km/h), Nelson estimated that the actual speed was around 55 mph (89 km/h) based on the wreckage and the position of Dean's body.

Wütherich survived the impact with a broken jaw and serious hip and femur injuries that required immediate surgery. Turnupseed was not seriously injured in the crash. He sustained facial bruises and a bloodied nose. After being interviewed by the CHP, Turnupseed hitchhiked in the dark to his home in Tulare. Roth took photographs of the crash scene later acquired by Seita Ohnishi, a retired Japanese businessman who erected a memorial near the site.

Some sources attest that Dean's last known words, uttered just before impact after Wütherich told Dean to decelerate as the Ford Tudor pulled into their lane, as: "That guy's gotta stop ... He'll see us." Lee Raskin believes that any reports that Dean and Wütherich spoke just prior to the crash are pure conjecture. According to the coroner's deposition of Wütherich taken in the hospital, and later in a 1960 interview, Wütherich could not recall any of the exact moments directly preceding or following the crash.

== Inquest and aftermath ==
The official sheriff-coroner called for an inquest, held at the council chambers in San Luis Obispo on October 11, 1955. Turnupseed told the jury that he did not see the low-profile Spyder until after he was turning left onto SR 41. After other testimony by the CHP and witnesses, the coroner's jury returned a verdict of accidental death with no criminal intent, finding Turnupseed not guilty of any contributory wrongdoing in the death of Dean.

Though not charged with any offense, Turnupseed had nevertheless been dealt a devastating blow that would haunt him for the rest of his life. He granted just one interview, to the Tulare Advance-Register newspaper immediately following the crash, but after that, he refused to speak publicly about the accident. Turnupseed later owned and operated a very successful family electrical contracting business in Tulare. He died at the age of 63 from lung cancer in 1995.

Wütherich, after enduring several complicated surgeries on his hip and femur, returned to West Germany in 1957 with psychological and legal problems. He worked for Porsche's testing department and international rally and racing teams during the 1960s. He died in July 1981 at the age of 53 in Kupferzell, West Germany, when he lost control of his car and crashed into a residence. As with Dean, Wütherich was extricated from the wreck and died at the scene.

While filming Giant, Dean filmed a short public-service announcement with actor Gig Young for the National Safety Council. It featured Dean dressed as Jett Rink talking about how excessive speed on the highway may be more dangerous than racing on the track. At the end of the segment, instead of reading the scripted phrase "The life you save may be your own," Dean ad-libbed the line as "The life you might save might be mine."

== Funeral and memorial ==
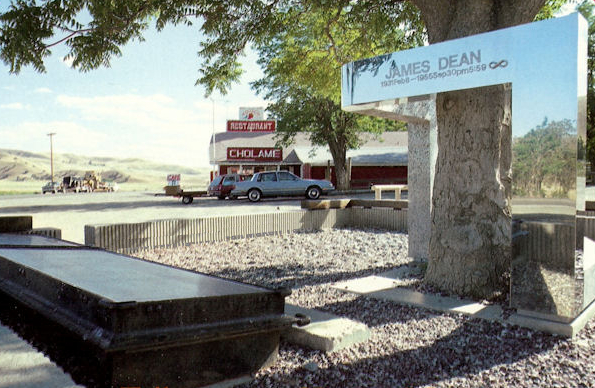
James Dean Memorial in Cholame. Dean died approximately one mile east of this tree.

Dean's funeral was held on October 8, 1955, at the Fairmount Friends Church in Fairmount, Indiana. The coffin remained closed to conceal the severe injuries to his upper torso and face. An estimated 600 mourners were in attendance, while another 2,400 fans gathered outside the church during the procession. Dean's body is buried at Park Cemetery in Fairmount, less than a mile from where he was raised on his aunt and uncle's farm.

In 1977, a memorial to Dean was erected in Cholame, California. The stylized sculpture is composed of stainless steel around a tree of heaven growing in front of the former Cholame post-office building. The sculpture was designed in Japan and transported to Cholame, accompanied by the project's benefactor, Seita Ohnishi of Kobe. Ohnishi chose the site after examining the location of the crash scene less than a mile away. The original Highway 41 and 46 junction where the collision occurred has shifted slightly as the two roadways were realigned over the decades to improve safety. In April 2023, construction began on a new elevated interchange that will eliminate the left turn across traffic from Highway 46 across Highway 41. On September 30, 2005, the junction at SR 46 and SR 41 was dedicated as the James Dean Memorial Junction as part of California's official commemoration of the 50th anniversary of Dean's death.

The dates and hours of Dean's birth and death are etched into the sculpture along with a handwritten description by Dean's friend William Bast quoting one of Dean's favorite lines from Antoine de Saint-Exupéry's The Little Prince: "What is essential is invisible to the eye." It also includes an infinity symbol next to the date of Dean's death to indicate that he will never be forgotten.

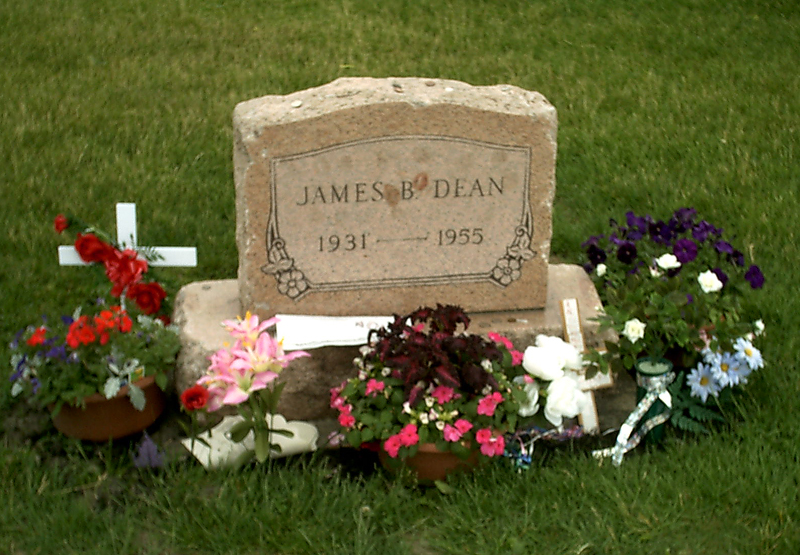
Dean's grave in his hometown, Fairmount, Indiana.

== "Curse" of Dean's car ==
The "curse" of James Dean's car, the "Little Bastard", has become part of America's cultural mythology. The story of the "curse" begins before the car itself had been involved in any crash; in his 1985 autobiography Blessings in Disguise, British actor Alec Guinness relates that on his first night in Los Angeles on September 23, 1955, after leaving a restaurant with no table available and starting to look elsewhere, he and his friend Thelma Moss met Dean, who invited them to dine with him at his table at the place that they had just left. Dean showed them his silver Porsche and said: "It's just been delivered." Guinness allegedly warned Dean to never enter the car: "Please, never get in it. It is now ten o'clock, Friday the 23rd of September, 1955. If you get in that car you will be found dead in it by this time next week." The following Friday, his prediction came true. However, Guinness did not mention this alleged prophetic warning until decades after Dean's death.

After the fatal crash, Warren Beath, a James Dean archivist and author, attributes the existence of the "curse" to George Barris, the self-described "King of the Kustomizers", who says he was the first to purchase the wrecked car. Barris promoted the "curse" after he placed the wreck on public display in 1956. Over the years, Barris described a mysterious series of accidents and car crashes that occurred from 1956 to 1960 involving the "Little Bastard" that resulted in serious injuries to spectators and even a truck driver's death. Raskin states many claims regarding the "curse" appear to have been based on Barris's 1974 book Cars of the Stars.

Raskin's 2005 book James Dean: At Speed states that the wrecked Spyder was declared as a total loss by the insurance company, which paid Dean's father Winton fair-market value as a settlement. The insurance company, through a salvage yard in Burbank, sold the Spyder to Dr. William F. Eschrich, who had competed against Dean in his own sports car at three race events in 1955. Eschrich dismantled the engine and mechanical parts and installed the Porsche four-cam engine in his Lotus IX race car chassis. Eschrich then raced the Porsche-powered Lotus, which he called a "Potus", at seven California Sports Car Club events during 1956. While driving the car at the Pomona Sports Car Races on October 21, 1956, Eschrich was involved in a minor "shunt" (low-speed, minor traffic collision) with another driver.

Barris's Cars of the Stars states that a Dr. McHenry, "driving a car powered by the engine from Dean's car, was killed when his vehicle went out of control and struck a tree in the first race in which the motor had been used since Dean's mishap. Another doctor, William F. Eschrid [sic] of Burbank, was injured in the same race when his car, which contained the drivetrain from Dean's car, rolled over." Eschrich, interviewed a day after McHenry's fatal crash, said he had loaned the Dean transmission and several other parts to McHenry: "I don't believe he was using the transmission when he crashed, but he was using the back swinging arms which holds the rear end." McHenry appears to have the distinction of being the only bona fide victim of the "curse".

Raskin states that although Barris may have customized several cars for Rebel Without a Cause, he never customized any of Dean's personal cars and neither of his Porsches. Lew Bracker, Dean's best friend in Los Angeles and fellow Porsche racer, maintained that Barris was not involved with Dean's racing activities; he was never considered to be part of Dean's "inner circle" invited to go to Salinas on September 30, 1955. It is not known exactly how Barris knew Eschrich, but he was given the Spyder's mangled body after Eschrich had stripped out the Porsche. In 1956, Barris announced that he was going to rebuild the "Little Bastard", but that proved to be a Herculean task as the wrecked chassis had no remaining integral strength. Instead, Barris decided to weld aluminum sheet metal over the caved-in left front fender and cockpit area. He proceeded to beat on the aluminum panels with a 2x4 to try to simulate what would appear to be collision damage. Later in 1956, Barris loaned out the "Little Bastard" to the Los Angeles chapter of the National Safety Council for a local rod and custom car show. The gruesome display was promoted as: "James Dean's Last Sports Car". During 1957–1959, the exhibit was toured in various rod and custom car shows, movie theatres, bowling alleys, and highway safety displays throughout California.

There are few stories associated with the "curse" that can be corroborated. For example, a wire service story on March 12, 1959, reported that the "Little Bastard", temporarily stored in a garage at 3158 Hamilton Avenue in Fresno, caught fire "awaiting display as a safety exhibit in a coming sports and custom automobile show". However, on May 12, 1959, The Fresno Bee, reported that the fire occurred on the night of March 11 and only slight damage occurred to the Spyder without any damage to other cars or property in the garage. No one was injured: "The cause of the fire is unknown. It burned two tires and scorched the paint on the vehicle." Later that year, the "Little Bastard" toured national auto shows and traffic safety exhibitions. Legend also holds that the "Little Bastard" mysteriously disappeared in 1960. According to Barris, the Spyder was returning from a traffic safety exhibit in Florida in a sealed truck. In Barris' book and in many TV interviews, he said the "Little Bastard" was being shipped back in a sealed boxcar. When the train arrived in Los Angeles, Barris said he signed the manifest and verified that the seal was intact—but the boxcar was empty.

Raskin believes that Barris's "Little Bastard" side show had lost its fan appeal just as the 1960s pop culture began to focus on "big block" Muscle Cars. Raskin also believes that Barris opted to misplace the "Little Bastard". The mysterious disappearance stories were Barris's way of perpetuating the Dean myth, especially on the milestone anniversaries of Dean's death.

Although the "Little Bastard" remains missing as of 2022, Historic Auto Attractions in Roscoe, Illinois, claims to have an original piece of Dean's Spyder on display. It is a small chunk of aluminum, a few square inches in size, that was stolen from an area near the broken windscreen while the Spyder was being stored in the Cholame Garage following the crash. In 2005, for the 50th anniversary of Dean's death, the Volo Auto Museum in Volo, Illinois, announced they were displaying what was purported to be the passenger door of the "Little Bastard". Volo and Barris offered $1,000,000 to anyone who could prove that they owned the remains of the "Little Bastard". No one came forth to claim the prize.

The 4-Cam Porsche engine (#90059), along with the original California owner's registration listing the engine number, is still in the possession of the family of the late Dr. Eschrich. The Porsche's transaxle assembly (#10046), is owned by Porsche collector and restorer Jack Styles in Massachusetts. Raskin originally documented and published all the serial numbers (VINs) for the Spyder (chassis, engine, transmission), as well as for his 356 Super Speedster. As of 2004, neither of Dean's Porsches have been located.

== Documentary ==
On February 15, 2009, all three of the California Highway Patrol (CHP) officers who dealt with Dean on the day of his death – Officer Otie Hunter, who ticketed Dean for speeding, and Officers Ernie Tripke and Ronald Nelson, who investigated the fatal crash – participated and shared their memories of the crash in an SCVTV documentary titled The Stuff of Legend: James Dean's Final Ride, co-produced by the Santa Clarita Valley Historical Society.
