= California State Route 46 =

Highway in California

State Route 46
- SR 46 highlighted in red

Route information
- Maintained by Caltrans
- Length: 110.696 mi (178.148 km) SR 46 is broken into pieces, and the length does not reflect the US 101 overlap that would be required to make the route continuous.
- History: State highway in 1916; numbered in 1964

Major junctions
- West end: SR 1 near Cambria
- US 101 in Paso Robles; SR 41 from Shandon to Cholame; I-5 in Lost Hills; SR 43 in Wasco
- East end: SR 99 at Famoso

Location
- Country: United States
- State: California
- Counties: San Luis Obispo, Kern

Highway system
- State highways in California; Interstate; US; State; Scenic; History; Pre‑1964; Unconstructed; Deleted; Freeways
← SR 45	→ SR 47

State Route 46 (SR 46) is an east–west state highway in the U.S. state of California. It is a major crossing of the Coast Ranges and it is the southernmost crossing of the Diablo Range, connecting SR 1 on the Central Coast near Cambria and US 101 in Paso Robles with SR 99 at Famoso in the San Joaquin Valley.

The road that is now SR 46 was built and improved during the 1920s and was fully paved by 1930. The majority of SR 46 was originally designated as U.S. Route 466; however, after the latter was entirely removed from the U.S. Highway system, the eastern portion of the route became SR 46.

== Route description ==
Route 46 is defined in section 346 of the California Streets and Highways Code. The definition omits the concurrency with Route 101 instead of duplicating that segment in the other route's definition in the code:

Route 46 is from:
(a) Route 1 near Cambria to Route 101 near Paso Robles.
(b) Route 101 in Paso Robles to Route 99 near Famoso via Cholame Pass.

State Route 46 begins at SR 1 southeast of Cambria, about one mile (1.6 km) from the Pacific Ocean. It heads east as the Eric Seastrand Highway across the Santa Lucia Range on a relatively straight roadway built in the 1970s, bypassing the steep, curvy Santa Rosa Creek Road. After passing near several wineries, this first segment ends at US 101 north of Templeton, where SR 46 turns north, overlapping the US 101 freeway through the valley formed by the Salinas River to central Paso Robles. Immediately after splitting from US 101, SR 46 crosses the Salinas River, passing near the Paso Robles Municipal Airport, and then heads east through a hilly area with several wineries and the community of Whitley Gardens. It then runs partially alongside the Estrella River to a merge with SR 41 near Shandon and a rest area. There, it turns northeast, following Cholame Creek through Cholame Pass between the Cholame Hills and Temblor Range to the settlement of Cholame and the split with SR 41. After crossing into Kern County, the highway continues to rise as it heads east up the Antelope Grade to a summit near Bluestone Ridge before descending through Polonio Pass into the San Joaquin Valley. State Route 46 takes the southernmost crossing of the Diablo Range, which is one of the routes linking the Central Valley to the coast. Interstate 580, State Route 152, and State Route 46 are the major routes that cross the Diablo Range. This route is heavily used when the Grapevine is closed. Truckers who do not want to take SR 58 through Tehachapi can use this route to head to I-5 to the Bay Area, Northern California, and vice versa. Many travelers from the Bay Area also use this route to head to Tehachapi Pass and access Interstate 40, the Antelope Valley, Las Vegas, and Mount Whitney, if they do not want to use I-5.

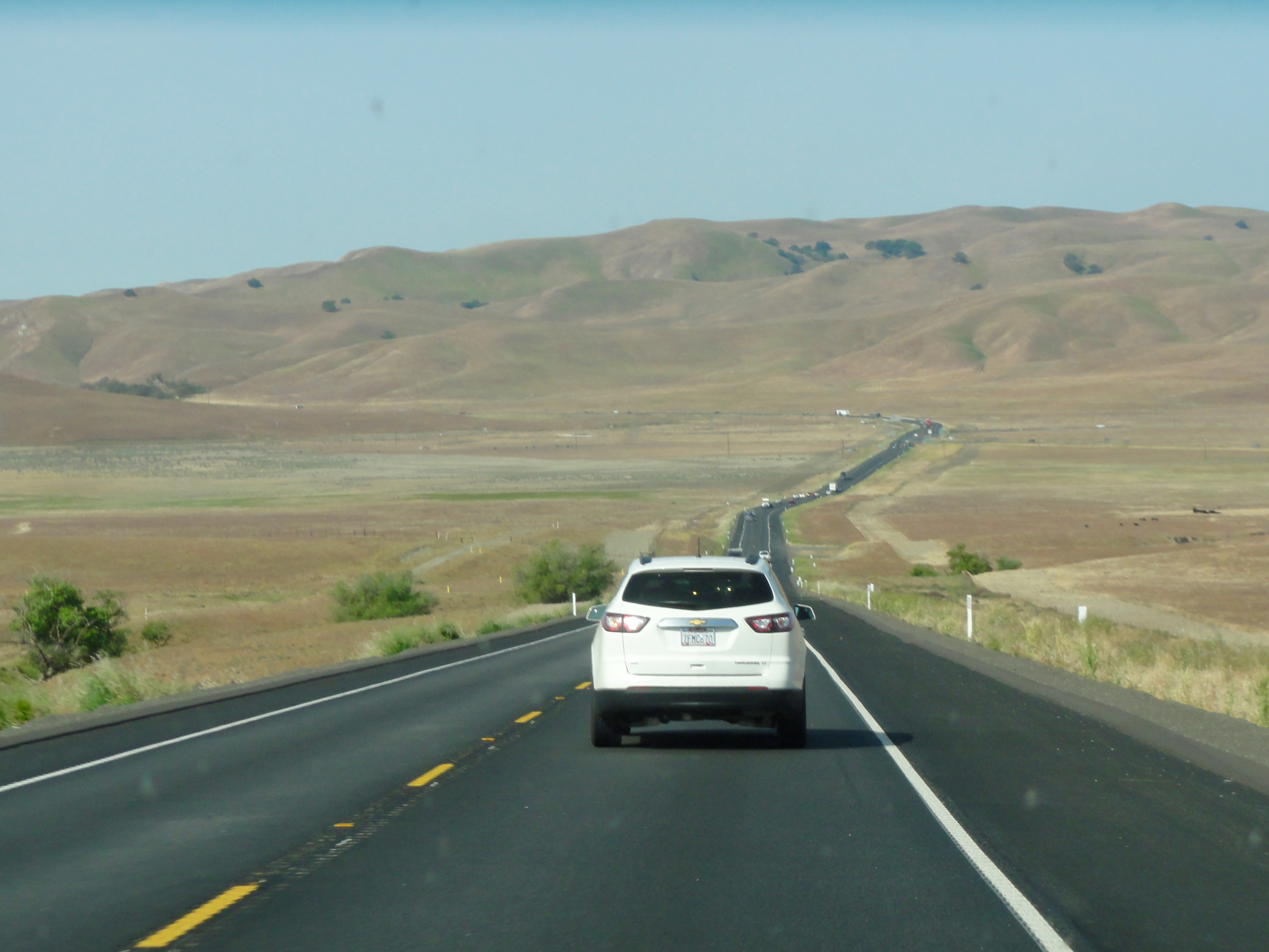
Descending into Cholame westbound on SR 46. The Cholame Hills are visible in the distance.

Once it enters the San Joaquin Valley, SR 46, known as the Paso Robles Highway, follows an almost perfectly straight eastward alignment, crossing SR 33 at Blackwells Corner, passing through the Lost Hills Oil Field, and intersecting I-5 about two miles (3.2 km) past Lost Hills and the crossing of the California Aqueduct. SR 46 then passes through the Semitropic Oil Field about seven miles (11 km) west of Wasco. SR 46 and SR 43 overlap for a short distance in the city of Wasco, and then SR 46 passes over Calloway Canal and Friant Canal before it ends at SR 99 in Famoso. The county-maintained Famoso Road continues east across SR 65 and into the Sierra Nevada foothills.

East of Paso Robles, SR 46 is part of the California Freeway and Expressway System, and east of US 101 is part of the National Highway System, a network of highways that are considered essential to the country's economy, defense, and mobility by the Federal Highway Administration. The highway from SR 1 to SR 41 near Cholame is an eligible State Scenic Highway, but it is not officially designated as a scenic highway by the California Department of Transportation.

== History ==
As part of the second state highway bond issue, approved by the state's voters in 1916, Route 33 was created, linking the San Joaquin Valley trunk (Route 4, now SR 99) near Bakersfield with the coast trunk (Route 2, now US 101 in Paso Robles, passing through the Coast Ranges via Cholame Pass. The road was not yet built in 1919 when the Automobile Blue Book recommended only the county-maintained "very poor road" (now SR 58) via Simmler as a connection between the valley and Central Coast. By 1925, the Cholame Pass highway had been improved, and paving was completed in December 1930. An extension west to Route 56 (now SR 1) near Cambria was added in 1933; however, it ran along Santa Rosa Creek Road, north of today's alignment.

The state sign route system was established in 1934 but the majority of Route 33 did not receive a state route designation, instead becoming part of the new U.S. Route 466. However, US 466 turned southwest from Cholame Pass along Legislative Route 125 (modern SR 41) to Morro Bay. Sign Route 41, which followed Legislative Route 125 northeast of Cholame, continued along Route 33 west to the coast. However, Route 125 had still not been paved between Cholame and Atascadero by the 1950s and so US 466 was moved to the longer but better-quality Route 33 via Paso Robles, replacing SR 41 to Paso Robles and overlapping US 101 to Atascadero. As SR 41 had not been signed over the unpaved road west of Paso Robles, it was truncated to Cholame. US 466 was eliminated in the 1964 renumbering, becoming SR 46 east from Paso Robles. However, instead of going south and west to Morro Bay, SR 46 continued west to Cambria and the road via Creston and Atascadero to Morro Bay (which had since been paved) became part of SR 41. A new two-lane expressway carrying SR 46 west from Paso Robles was built in the mid-1970s, replacing Santa Rosa Creek Road.

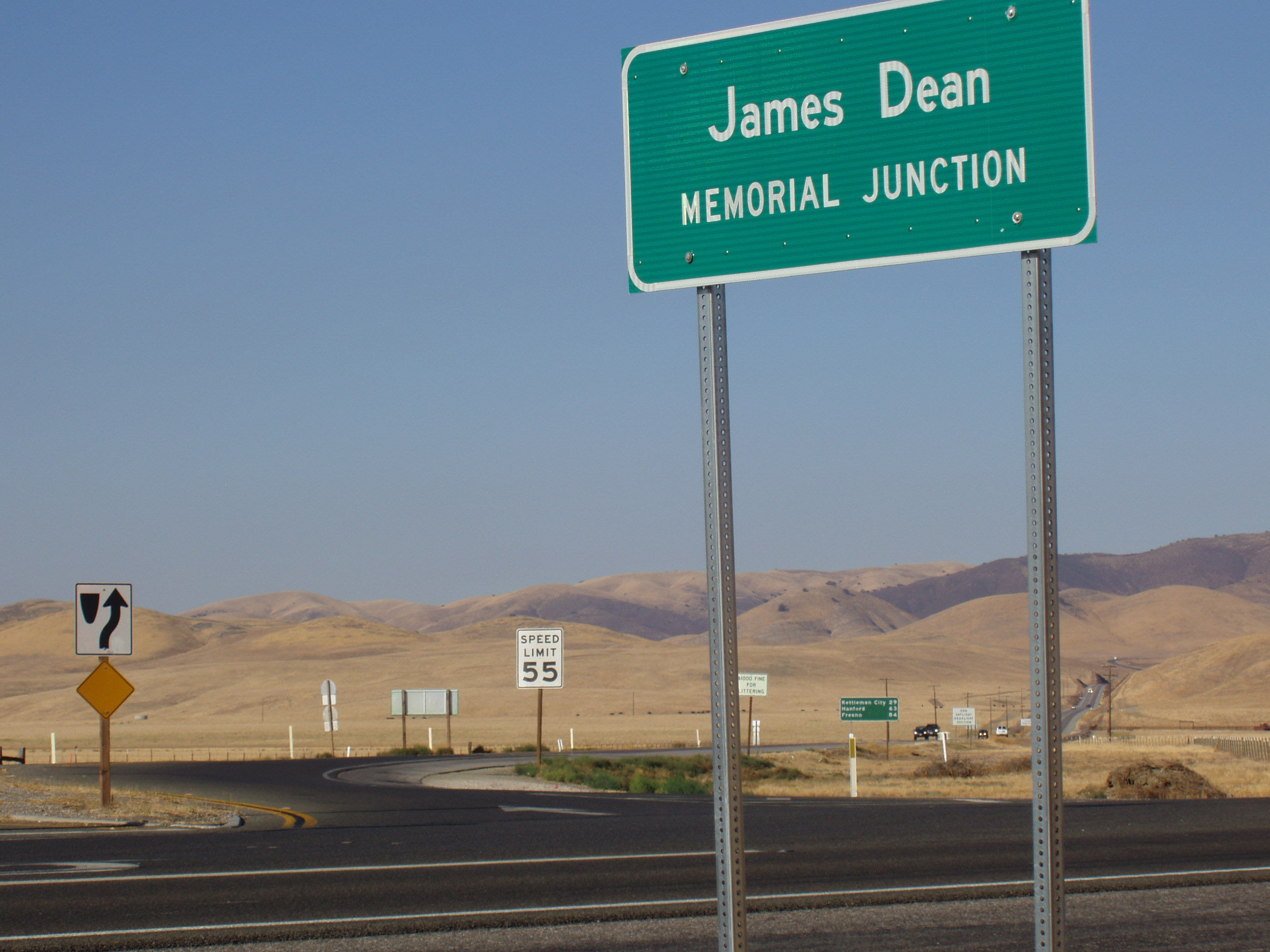
The James Dean Memorial Junction, looking northeast, with SR 41 heading away from the camera

The two-lane stretch from Paso Robles to Cholame was known as "Blood Alley" for the large number of vehicle incidents, mainly head-on collisions, among the high volume of commuters, truck drivers and tourists. Between 1994 and 1999, there were 206 accidents along the corridor, resulting in 17 deaths, and another 38 deaths between 2000 and 2010. The intersection between SR 46 and SR 41, known locally as the Wye, was more accident-prone than the statewide average. The California State Legislature dedicated that intersection as the James Dean Memorial Junction on September 30, 2005, for the 50th anniversary of the actor's death in a car crash near that site. The California Department of Transportation (Caltrans) carried out an interim safety project west of Cholame in December 1995, mandating daytime headlights and installing thermoplastic striping, a concrete barrier and rumble strips. In 2006, Caltrans identified SR 46 as a "critical east-west corridor connecting the Central Coast and Central Valley areas of California", in an environmental impact statement that approved the road's expansion. In 2010, the first stretch of newly widened road opened in Paso Robles, utilizing funds from a 2006 statewide ballot proposition. A series of additional projects and progressed eastward over the next decade.

In March 2022, construction began on the section near Cholame that led to the Wye. On April 25, 2023, workers broke ground on constructing a new grade-separated interchange at the James Dean Memorial Junction, which is scheduled to be completed in 2026. The 3.6 mi (5.8 km) portion of SR 46 leading to Kern County, known as the Antelope Grade Section, is scheduled to begin construction in 2026.

== Major intersections ==
Except where prefixed with a letter, postmiles were measured on the road as it was in 1964, based on the alignment that existed at the time, and do not necessarily reflect current mileage. Postmile prefixes include: R reflecting a realignment in the route since then, M indicating a second realignment, L referring to an overlap due to a correction or change, and T indicating postmiles classified as temporary. Segments that remain unconstructed or have been relinquished to local control may be omitted. The numbers reset at county lines; the start and end postmiles in each county are given in the county column.

County	Location	Postmile	Exit	Destinations	Notes
San Luis Obispo; SLO R0.15-60.85		R0.15		SR 1 – Cambria, Hearst Castle, Harmony, Cayucos, Morro Bay	West end of SR 46
San Luis Obispo; SLO R0.15-60.85	Paso Robles	R21.97 54.12 (Note: Indicates that the postmile represents the distance along US 101 rather than SR 46.)		US 101 south / Ramada Drive	Interchange; west end of US 101 overlap; US 101 exit 228
San Luis Obispo; SLO R0.15-60.85	Paso Robles	R21.97 54.12	West end of freeway on US 101		
San Luis Obispo; SLO R0.15-60.85	Paso Robles	55.67	229	Spring Street (US 101 Bus. north)	Eastbound exit and westbound entrance
San Luis Obispo; SLO R0.15-60.85	Paso Robles		230	Pine Street	Westbound exit and entrance
San Luis Obispo; SLO R0.15-60.85	Paso Robles		230	Paso Robles Street	Eastbound exit only
San Luis Obispo; SLO R0.15-60.85	Paso Robles	56.88	231A	16th Street	Westbound exit and eastbound entrance
San Luis Obispo; SLO R0.15-60.85	Paso Robles	57.92 29.76	East end of freeway on US 101		
San Luis Obispo; SLO R0.15-60.85	Paso Robles	57.92 29.76		US 101 north / CR G14 (24th Street) – Paso Robles	Interchange; east end of US 101 overlap; US 101 north exit 231, south exit 231B
San Luis Obispo; SLO R0.15-60.85	Shandon	48.63		SR 41 south (West Centre Street) / McMillan Canyon Road – Shandon, Creston	West end of SR 41 overlap; former US 466 west; also accessible westbound via a left turn at East Centre Street
San Luis Obispo; SLO R0.15-60.85		49.60	Shandon Rest Area		
San Luis Obispo; SLO R0.15-60.85	Cholame	55.11	56	SR 41 north – Fresno	Interchange; east end of SR 41 overlap
Kern; KER 0.00-57.79			Polonio Pass		
Kern; KER 0.00-57.79	Blackwells Corner	20.54		SR 33 – Coalinga, McKittrick, Taft	
Kern; KER 0.00-57.79		27.48		Brown Material Road, Halloway Road	
Kern; KER 0.00-57.79	Lost Hills	32.53		I-5 (West Side Freeway) – Sacramento, Los Angeles	Interchange; I-5 exit 278
Kern; KER 0.00-57.79		43.02		Rowlee Road – Buttonwillow	
Kern; KER 0.00-57.79	Wasco	50.90		SR 43 south (F Street) to I-5 south – Shafter, Central District	West end of SR 43 overlap
Kern; KER 0.00-57.79	Wasco	51.22		SR 43 north / J Street – Corcoran	East end of SR 43 overlap
Kern; KER 0.00-57.79	Famoso	57.78		SR 99 – Delano, Bakersfield	Interchange; east end of SR 46; former US 99 / US 466 east; SR 99 exit 44
Kern; KER 0.00-57.79	Famoso	57.78		Famoso Road – Famoso	Continuation beyond SR 99
1.000 mi = 1.609 km; 1.000 km = 0.621 mi: Concurrency terminus; Incomplete access
