= Polonio Pass =

Depression in the Coast Ranges

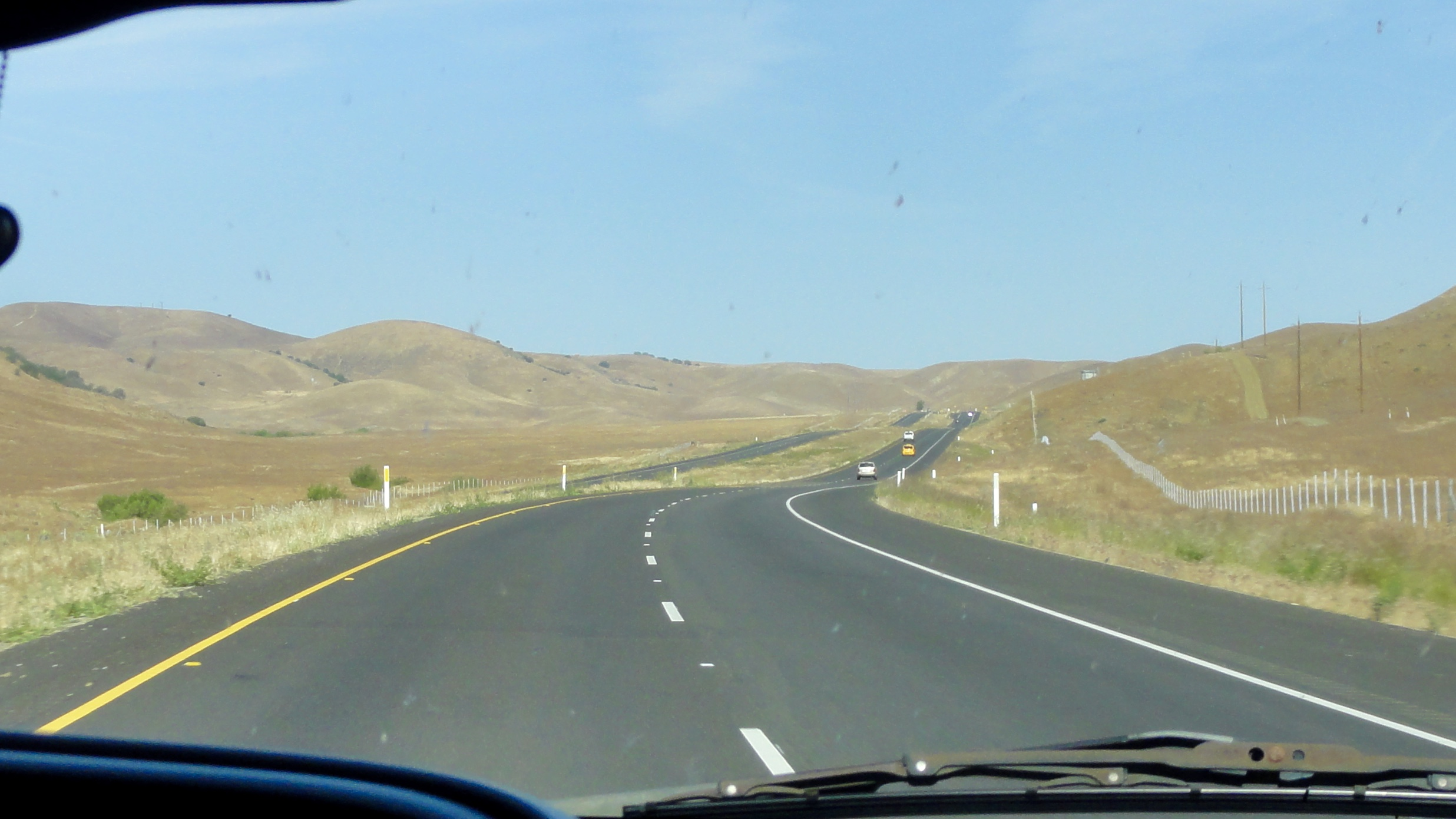
- View of the surrounding grasslands from the crest of Polonio Pass.
- Interactive map of Polonio Pass
- Elevation: 1,750 ft (530 m)
- Traversed by: SR 46; US 466 (until 1964)

Third Approach
- Location: Kern County
- Range: Temblor and Diablo Ranges
- Coordinates: 35.723679°N 120.193286°W

Polonio Pass is a low mountain pass in the California Coast Ranges, marking the boundary between the Temblor Range to the south and the Diablo Range to the north. It is traversed by California State Route 46, which links Kern County, in the Central Valley, to Shandon and Paso Robles in San Luis Obispo County. The name Polonio Pass is traditionally associated with the eastern approach to the summit, while the western approach is known as the Antelope Grade. The terrain consists mostly of gently rolling grass-covered hills. James Dean crested the pass westbound not long before his fatal automobile crash in 1955.
