= Blackwells Corner, California =

Unincorporated community in California, United States

- Unincorporated community
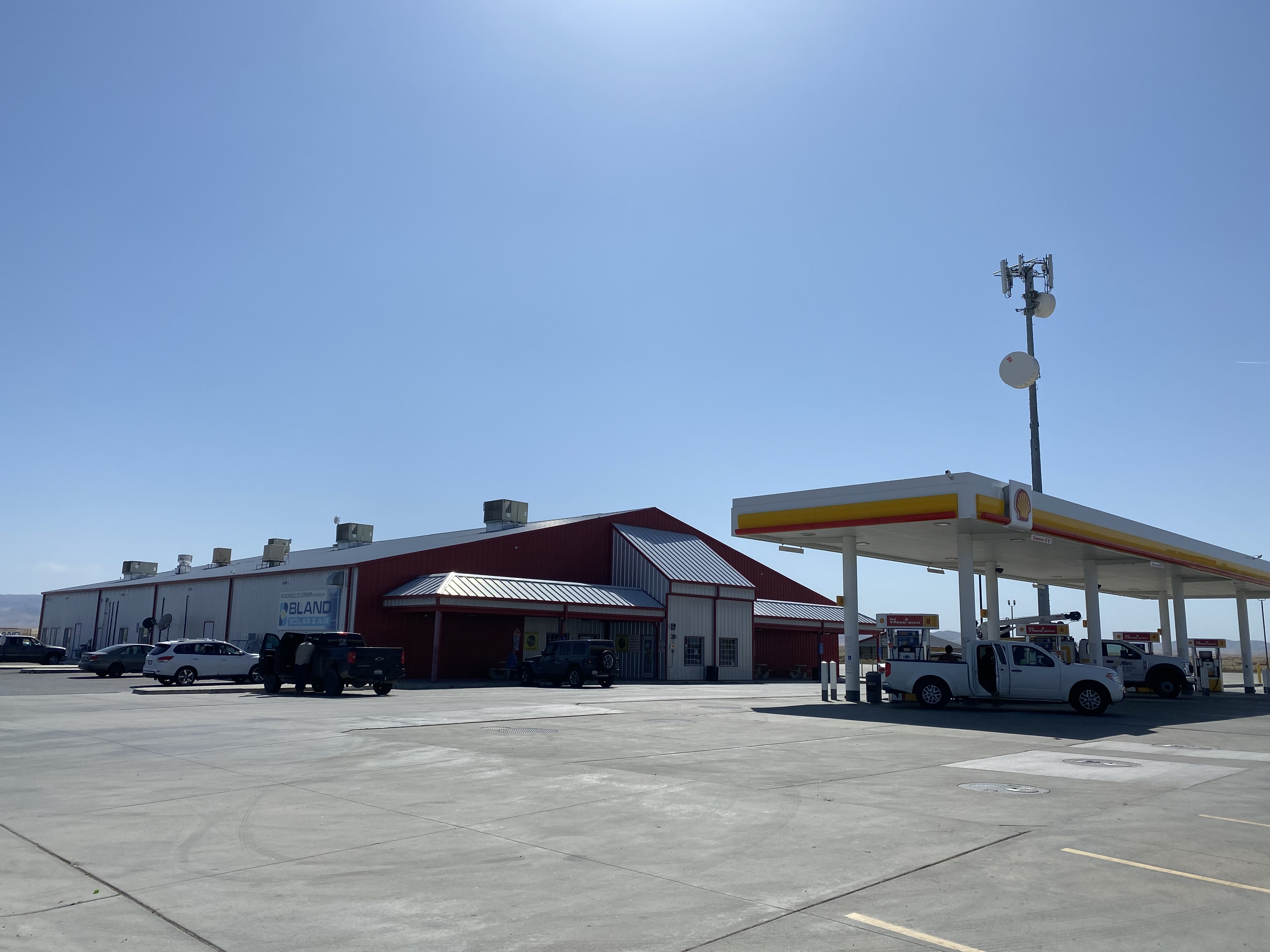
- The Shell gas station at the SR 46 and SR 33 intersection marks the location of Blackwells Corner

- Location in California Blackwells Corner, California (the United States)
- Coordinates: 35°36′54″N 119°52′04″W
- Country: United States
- State: California
- County: Kern
- Elevation: 650 ft (198 m)

Blackwells Corner is an unincorporated community in Kern County, California, United States. It is located 50 miles (80 km) west-northwest of Bakersfield, at an elevation of 650 feet (198 m). Blackwells Corner is at the intersection of SR 46 (formerly US 466) and SR 33, and was the last place James Dean was seen alive prior to his death in a car wreck.

The name honors George Blackwell, who started a rest stop there in 1921.

== Climate ==
According to the Köppen Climate Classification system, Blackwells Corner has an arid climate, abbreviated "BWk" on climate maps.
