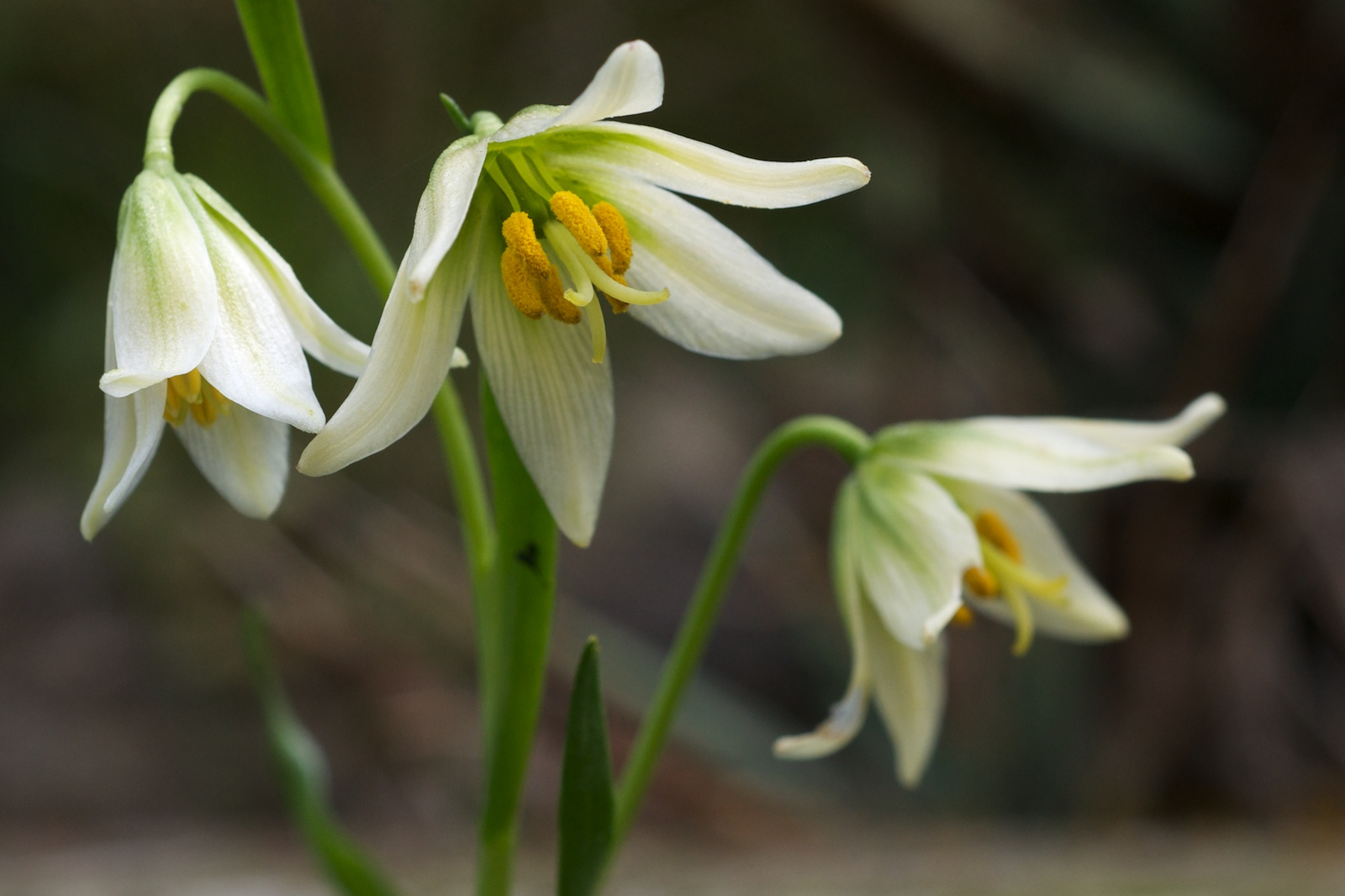

Conservation status
- Imperiled (NatureServe)

Scientific classification
- Kingdom: Plantae
- Clade: Embryophytes
- Clade: Tracheophytes
- Clade: Spermatophytes
- Clade: Angiosperms
- Clade: Monocots
- Order: Liliales
- Family: Liliaceae
- Subfamily: Lilioideae
- Genus: Fritillaria
- Species: F. liliacea

Binomial name
- Fritillaria liliacea Lindl.

Synonyms
- Fritillaria alba Kellogg 1855, illegitimate homonym not Nutt. 1818; Liliorhiza lanceolata Kellogg

= Fritillaria liliacea =

Fragrant fritillary

Species of flowering plant

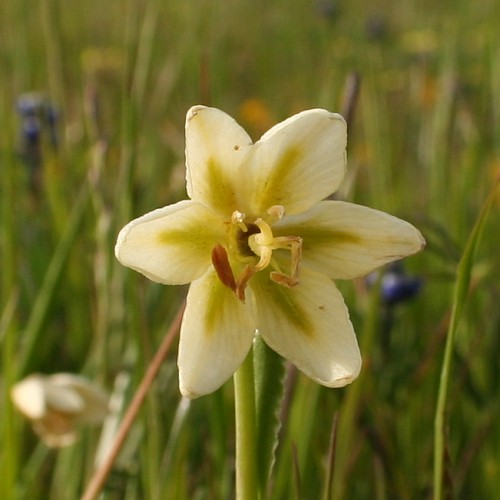

Fritillaria liliacea, the fragrant fritillary, is a threatened bulbous herbaceous perennial plant in the lily family Liliaceae. It is native to the region surrounding San Francisco Bay in California, USA.

== Description ==
The bell-shaped white flowers have greenish stripes and are set on a nodding pedicel of about 37 centimeters in height. The blooms are odorless to faintly fragrant. Fritillia liliacea prefers heavy soils including clays; for example, andesitic and basaltic soils derived from the Sonoma Volcanic soil layers are suitable substrate for this species.

== Distribution ==
The range of this wildflower is over parts of southwestern Northern California, United States, especially Solano and Sonoma counties and at coastal locations south to Monterey County; occurrence is typically in open hilly grasslands at altitudes less than 200 meters in elevation.

This California endemic has been a candidate for listing as a U.S. federally endangered species, and some of the remaining fragmented colonies are at risk of local extinction, such that the species is considered locally endangered. Example occurrences are: Edgewood Park in San Mateo County and the Sonoma Mountains foothills in Sonoma County. Examples of highly fragmented or extirpated colonies are in San Francisco due to urban development.

== See also ==
- Sonoma County, California
