= Rolf Wütherich =

German racecar driver (1927–1981)

- Born: Rudolf Karl Wütherich; 5 August 1927; Heilbronn, Germany
- Died: 22 July 1981 (aged 53); Kupferzell, West Germany
- Cause of death: Car accident
- Occupation: Field engineer
- Known for: Death of James Dean

Rudolf Karl "Rolf" Wütherich (German: [ˈvyːtəʁɪç]; 5 August 1927 – 22 July 1981) was a German automotive engineer, mechanic and racer. He was the passenger in James Dean's Porsche at the time of Dean's death in a car crash in 1955. He experienced many personal difficulties as a result of the crash and himself died in a car crash 25 years later.

== Early life and education ==
Wütherich was born in Heilbronn, Württemberg, Germany on 5 August 1927. He served as a Luftwaffe glider pilot, paratrooper, and aircraft mechanic before joining the Daimler-Benz (a.k.a. Mercedes) factory racing department. In 1950 he joined the Porsche factory, becoming the second employee of their racing department. Wütherich participated as a factory team member at the 24 Hours of Le Mans races in 1952, 1953, and 1954. Wütherich was also a factory team member for the Porsche endurance racing and formula racing team at the AVUS, Mille Miglia, 12 Hours of Reims, and 6 Hours of Nürburgring races.

== Career ==
The Porsche factory sent Wütherich to the United States as a field engineer for Johnny von Neumann's Competition Motors in Los Angeles, where the new 550 Spyder racing cars were being distributed. He arrived in April 1955 and met actor James Dean, a Porsche Speedster racer, at the Bakersfield races. He befriended Dean and began to work on Dean's Speedster for race events.

=== James Dean's fatal crash ===
In mid-September 1955, Competition Motors received five new Porsche 550 Spyders that were being offered only to 'privateer' racers. Dean traded in his Super Speedster to purchase a new Spyder on September 21. Von Neumann only agreed to sell the new 550 Spyder to Dean as long as Wütherich would accompany him to the races as his mechanic. Dean immediately entered the Salinas Road Races scheduled for October 1–2.

On Friday morning, 30 September 1955, Dean and Wütherich were at Competition Motors preparing Dean's new Porsche 550 Spyder for the weekend sports car races at Salinas, California. Dean originally intended to trailer the Porsche to Salinas, behind his 1955 Ford Country Squire station wagon, driven by friend and movie stunt man, Bill Hickman, and accompanied by professional photographer Sanford Roth, who was planning a photo story of Dean at the races for Collier's magazine. Due to the Porsche being a newly assembled vehicle and thus not yet optimized fully, Wütherich recommended that Dean drive the Spyder to Salinas in order to have the engine and other components mechanically "broken in." The group had coffee and donuts at the Hollywood Ranch Market on Vine Street across from Competition Motors (not the legendary Farmer's Market at Fairfax and 3rd Ave., as sometimes reported) before leaving around 1:15pm. "Jimmy's and my nerves were pretty frayed when we finally pulled away from Competition Motors," Wütherich told Bill Barrett. "Our first stop was at a service station on Ventura Blvd.", he said. It was at that Mobil station on Ventura Blvd. at Beverly Glen Blvd. in Sherman Oaks where the photograph was taken of Dean standing next to the "Little Bastard." The group left around 2:00pm heading north on CA Rt. 99 and then over the ‘Grapevine’ toward Bakersfield.

At 3:30pm, Dean was stopped by a California Highway Patrolman, O.V. Hunter at Mettler Station on Wheeler Ridge, just south of Bakersfield, for driving 65 mph in a 55 mph zone. Hickman, following behind the Spyder in the Ford with the trailer, was also ticketed for driving 20 mph over the limit, as the speed limit for all vehicles towing a trailer was 45 mph. After receiving the speeding tickets, Dean and Hickman turned left onto Rt. 166/33 to avoid going through Bakersfield's 25 mph downtown district. Rt. 166/33 was a known short-cut for all the sports car drivers going to Salinas, termed ‘the racer’s road,’ which took them directly to Blackwells Corner at CA Route 46. At Blackwells Corner, Dean stopped briefly only for refreshments and met up with fellow racers Lance Reventlow and Bruce Kessler, who were also on their way to the Salinas road races in Reventlow's Mercedes-Benz 300 SL Coupe. As Reventlow and Kessler were leaving, they all agreed to meet for dinner in Paso Robles.

At approximately 5:15pm, Dean and Hickman left Blackwells Corner driving west on Route 46 toward Paso Robles, approximately sixty miles away. Dean accelerated in the Porsche and left the Ford station wagon far behind. Further along on Rt. 46, the Porsche crested Polonio Pass and headed down the long Antelope Grade passing cars along the way toward the junction floor at Rt. 46 and 41. Dean spotted an oncoming black-and-white 1950 Ford Custom coupe heading east on Rt. 46 toward the junction. The time was approximately 5:45pm. Its driver, 23-year-old Navy Veteran and Cal Poly student Donald Turnupseed, suddenly turned in front of the Porsche to take the left fork onto Route 41. Turnupseed then hesitated as he 'spiked' the brakes just as the Ford crossed over the center line. Dean saw an impending crash and apparently tried to 'power steer' the Spyder in a 'side stepping' racing maneuver—but there wasn't enough time or space as the two cars crashed almost head-on. The Spyder flipped up into the air and landed back on its wheels off in a gully, northwest of the junction. The sheer velocity of the impact sent the much heavier Ford broad-sliding thirty-nine feet down Rt. 46 in the west bound lane. Later findings showed that Dean drove at 70 mph and was braking hard before the crash. The first witnesses of the scene driving behind Turnupseed, Tom Frederick, 28, and his 15-year-old brother-in-law Don Dooley, testified at the coroner's inquest that Rolf Wütherich was actually driving the car and that James Dean sat in the passenger's seat. The inquest was only looking into the possibility of criminal wrongdoing by Turnupseed ("What we want to find out is who this person was, and how he came to his death, whether there was negligence on the part of Mr. Turnupseed, or whether there wasn’t."), such that the final landing position of Wütherich, on the road next to the driver's side after being ejected from the spinning Spyder, was not germane to the inquest.

James Dean had been cut from the Spyder's mangled cockpit after his left foot was crushed between the clutch and brake pedal. Dean was severely injured and was put in an ambulance. The barely conscious Wütherich, who had been thrown from the Spyder onto the shoulder of the road next to the Porsche, was loaded in next. Dean and Wütherich were taken to the Paso Robles War Memorial Hospital, twenty-eight miles away. Dean was pronounced dead on arrival. Wütherich survived the crash with a double fractured jaw and serious hip and femur injuries. He was taken to a Los Angeles hospital for immediate surgery. So badly torn was Wütherich's left hip that it required more surgery over the next six months.

== Personal life ==
As a result of the crash which killed James Dean, Wütherich developed severe psychological problems. He reportedly suffered from bouts of depression, suicidal tendencies and subsequently became an alcoholic. Some Dean fans blamed Wütherich for the actor's death and sent him abusive, threatening letters.

Wütherich was married four times and had one son. His first marriage was to a Hungarian woman named Julia and ended in 1954. A second marriage to a woman named Gudrun ended shortly after she accused him of killing James Dean. Wütherich married for a third time to a woman named Inge whom he met on vacation in Rimini. This marriage produced his son Bernd. They divorced after four years.

Wütherich's fourth and final marriage was to a woman named Doris. On 1 May 1967, he stabbed Doris while she slept after he had attempted to kill himself. Wütherich was arrested and, in 1969, was found guilty of attempted manslaughter. Due to his mental instability, Wütherich was ultimately sent to a mental institution in Weissenau in lieu of prison.

== Later career and death ==
Wütherich began to 'freelance' as a Porsche mechanic after the James Dean crash, but legal and psychological problems arose. He returned to West Germany, where Porsche invited him back to work with the factory's testing department. Wütherich eventually went back to the U.S. with the Porsche racing team, but only for the 12 Hours of Sebring races in 1957 and 1958.

In 1965, Wütherich established himself as a skilled rally navigator for the Porsche factory at the Monte Carlo Rally, where he teamed with driver Eugen Böhringer in a factory-sponsored 904 GTS Porsche to finish second overall and first in class. In 1966, Wütherich and Günter Klass teamed in a factory-sponsored 911S Coupe to finish fifth overall and first in class for the European Rally Championship season. In 1968, Wütherich was dismissed by the Porsche factory after 18 years of service. In 1979, he joined a Honda dealer in Hohenlohe, near his native Heilbronn.

In July 1981, he signed a contract for 20,000 Deutsche Marks for a feature TV show about him discussing the death of James Dean. On 22 July, an intoxicated Wütherich was killed when he lost control of his Honda Civic and crashed into the wall of a residence in Kupferzell. Like James Dean, Wütherich had to be cut from the wreck and was pronounced dead at the scene. He was 53 years old.
