= Cholame, California =

Unincorporated community in California, United States

- Unincorporated community
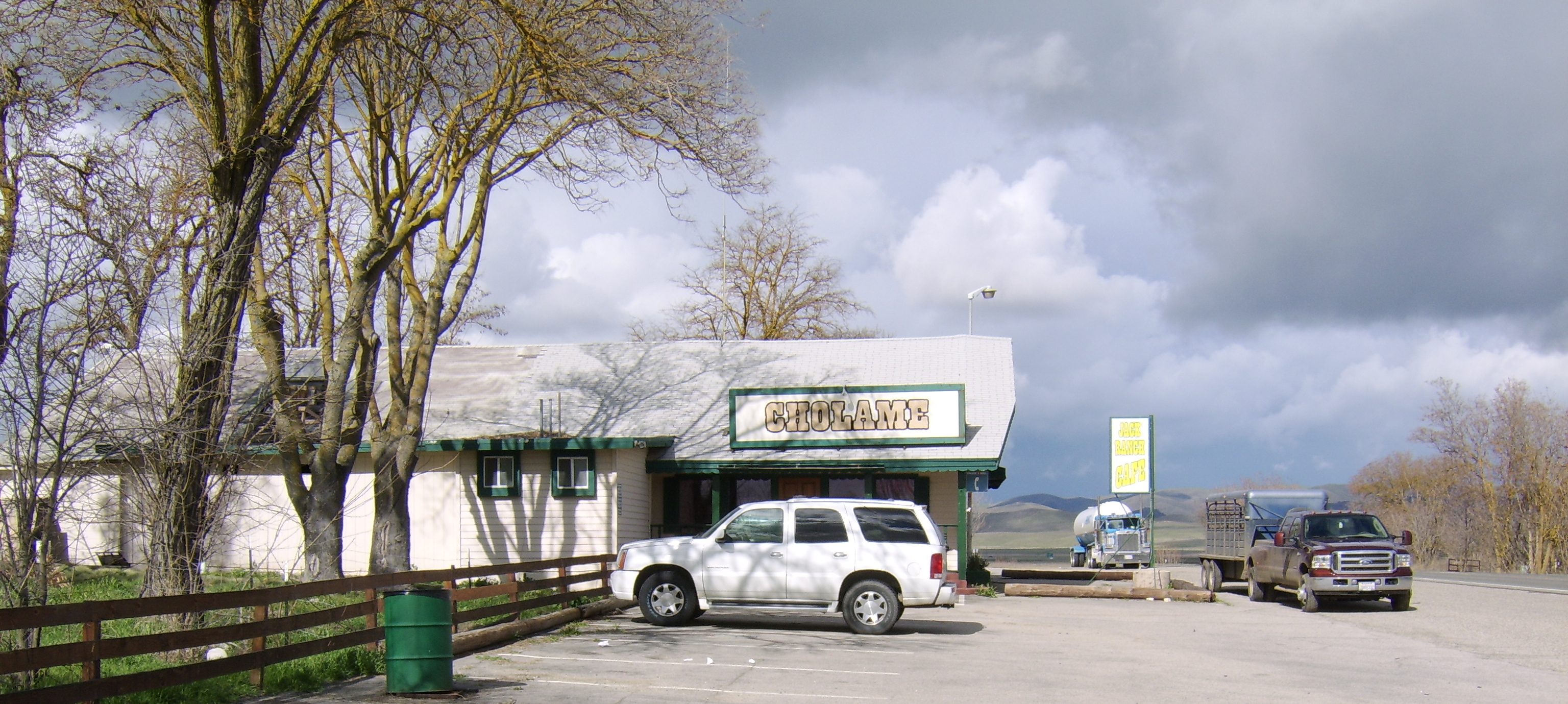
- Jack Ranch Cafe, Cholame, California

- Location within the state of California Cholame, California (the United States)
- Coordinates: 35°43′26″N 120°17′47″W
- Country: United States
- State: California
- County: San Luis Obispo
- Elevation: 1,157 ft (353 m)
- Time zone: UTC-8 (Pacific (PST))
  - Summer (DST): UTC-7 (PDT)
- ZIP code: 93461
- Area code: 805
- GNIS feature ID: 252871

Cholame (/ʃəˈlæm/; Salinan: tco'alamtram) is an unincorporated community in San Luis Obispo County, California, United States. It sits within a mile of the San Andreas Fault at an elevation of 1,157 feet (353 m) above sea level.

== History ==
Cholam was a Salinan rancheria recorded as lying fourteen leagues from Mission San Miguel Arcángel. It is mentioned under the date January 29, 1804, in the form Cholan, and appears as Cholame on a diseño of the San Miguel grant in 1840 and on one of the Cholam land grant of February 5, 1844. The spelling settled only gradually in nineteenth-century mapping: the Parke-Custer map of 1855 shows a Chelame Pass for the valley between Shandon and Cholame, the General Land Office map of 1859 has Choloma Creek, and the von Leicht-Craven map of 1873 gives Cholame Creek. The ethnographer J. Alden Mason recorded the village name as tco'alamtram and called Cholame "the most persistent of native village names"; a Miguelino speaker interviewed by Henry W. Henshaw described it as the largest of the villages of the San Miguel division, and Alexander S. Taylor reported it as the nearest rancheria to Mission San Miguel.

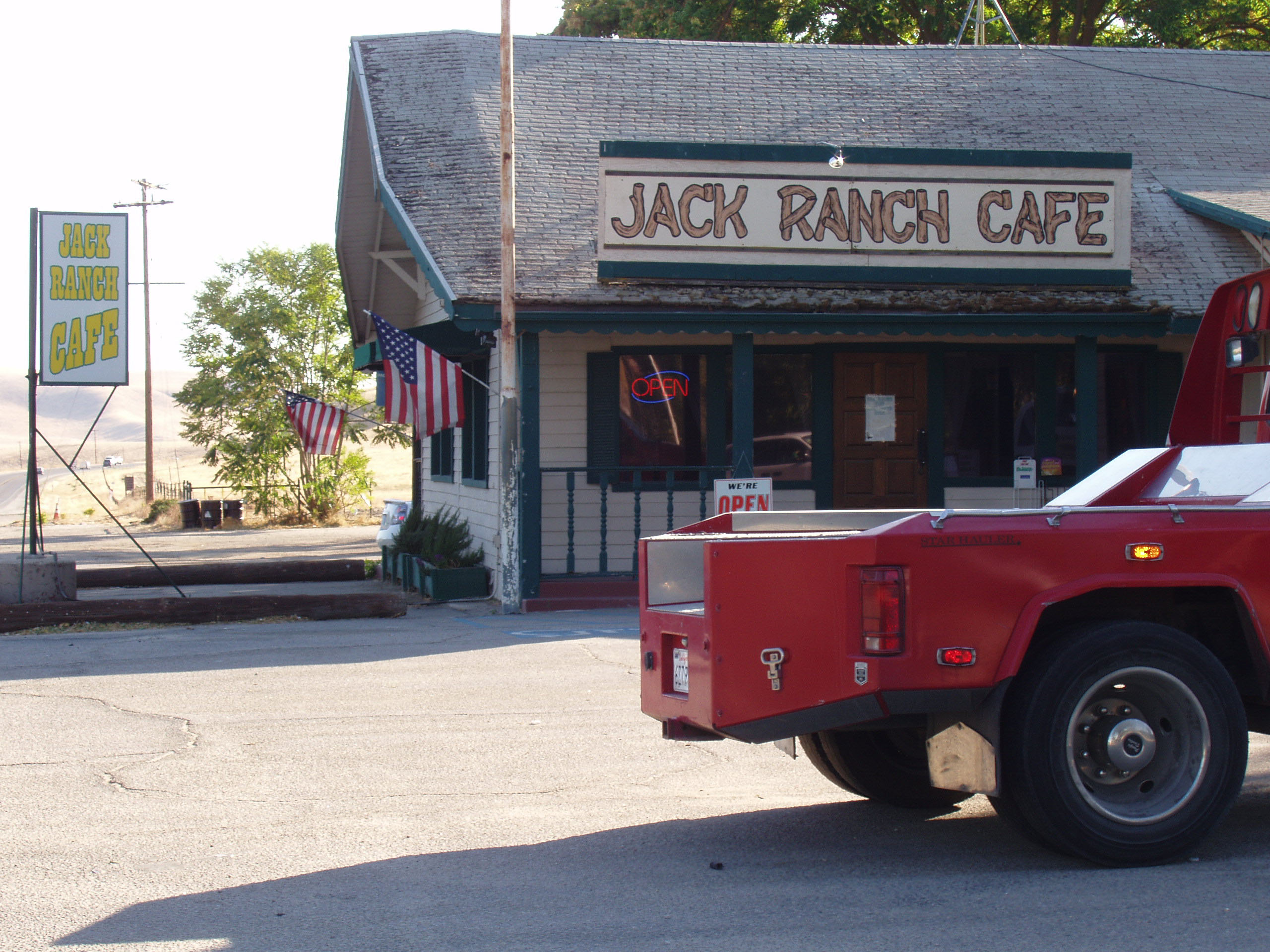
Jack Ranch Cafe

Rancho Cholame was a Mexican land grant of February 5, 1844. In 1867, William Welles Hollister (1818–1886) purchased Rancho Cholame. Hollister sold a half-interest in the rancho to Robert Edgar Jack in 1869.

Jack studied at Maine Wesleyan Seminary, and he later was an accountant at a shipping house in New York City. In the Civil War he enlisted in the 56th New York Volunteer Infantry Regiment, and he served in Harrisburg, Pennsylvania, during the Battle of Gettysburg and then in New York to quell "anti-Negro riots" there. Near the end of the war, he moved to California and became Hollister's accountant and secretary on the latter's San Justo Ranch surrounding the present city of Hollister. When that property was subdivided, the two bought the Cholame land.

Jack married Hollister's daughter, Lucy Ellen (Nellie) in 1870 and became the largest wool grower in Central California, later switching to cattle and agriculture. Jack organized the County Bank of San Luis Obispo.

The land was sold to the Hearst Corporation in 1966 and is still a working cattle ranch.

=== James Dean ===
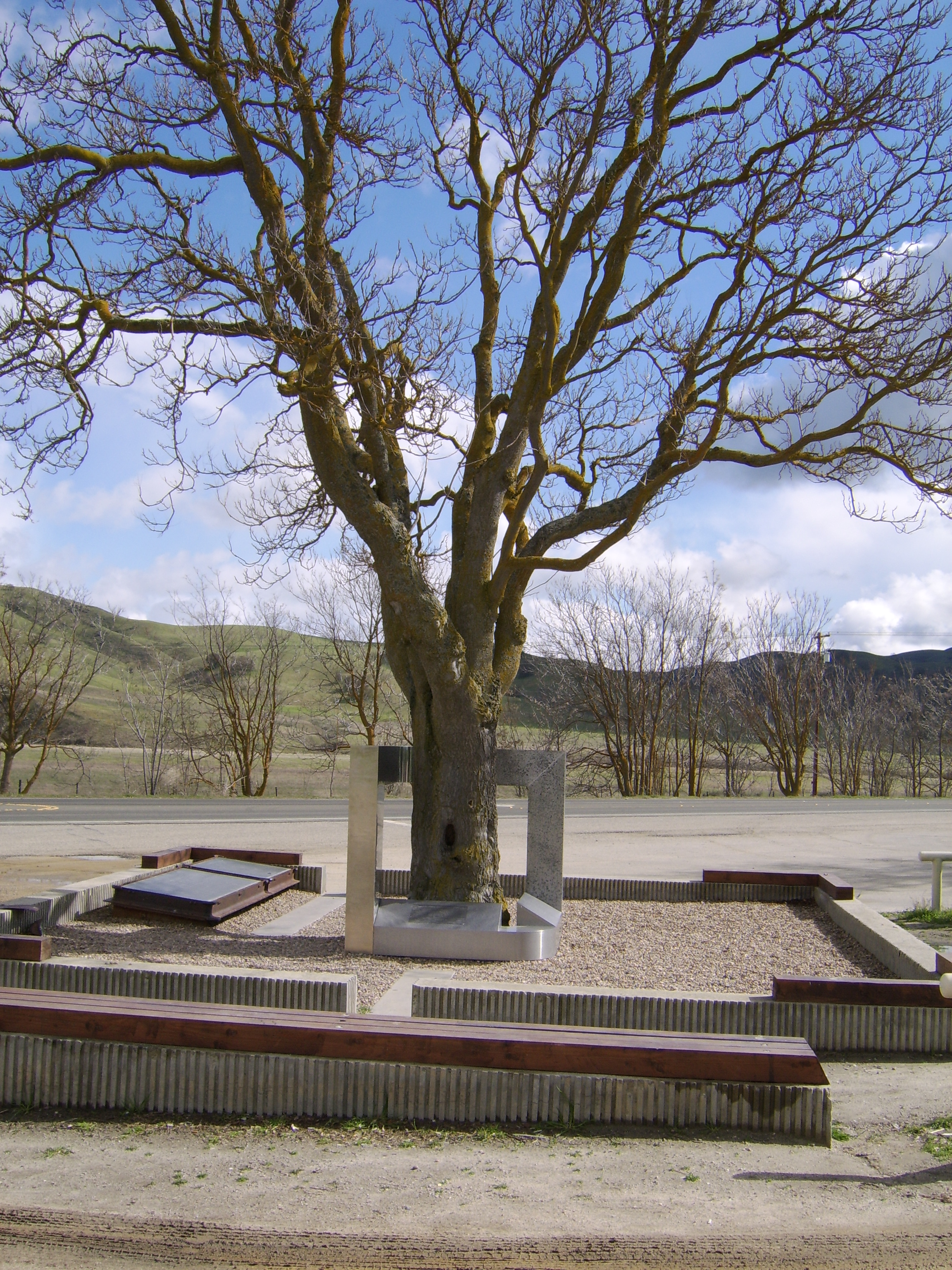
James Dean Memorial, Cholame

On September 30, 1955, actor James Dean died in a car crash when Cal Poly student Donald Turnupseed made a left turn without seeing Dean's Porsche 550 Spyder approaching at the junction of State Routes 41 and 46. Dean was the driver of the car that slammed into the car driven by Turnupseed. His passenger, named Rolf Wutherich, was thrown from the vehicle but survived. Dean was pronounced dead on arrival at the hospital.

On the same date in 2005, the State of California observed the 50th anniversary of Dean's death by naming the intersection as the James Dean Memorial Junction. A few hundred people, including state officials, a Dean family member, several Dean archivists and fans gathered at the junction and in Cholame to pay tribute to the actor.

A memorial to Dean was erected in 1977 near the Jack Ranch Cafe (then Stella's Country Kitchen) by a retired Japanese businessman from Kobe, Seita Ohnishi, costing $13,000 at the time. The monument is made of stainless steel and surrounds a tree of heaven. In particular, Ohnishi was fond of Dean's movie East of Eden, inspiring him to fund the memorial, which was designed in such a way to reflect both the beautiful and unfinished nature of the actor's life.

== Geography ==
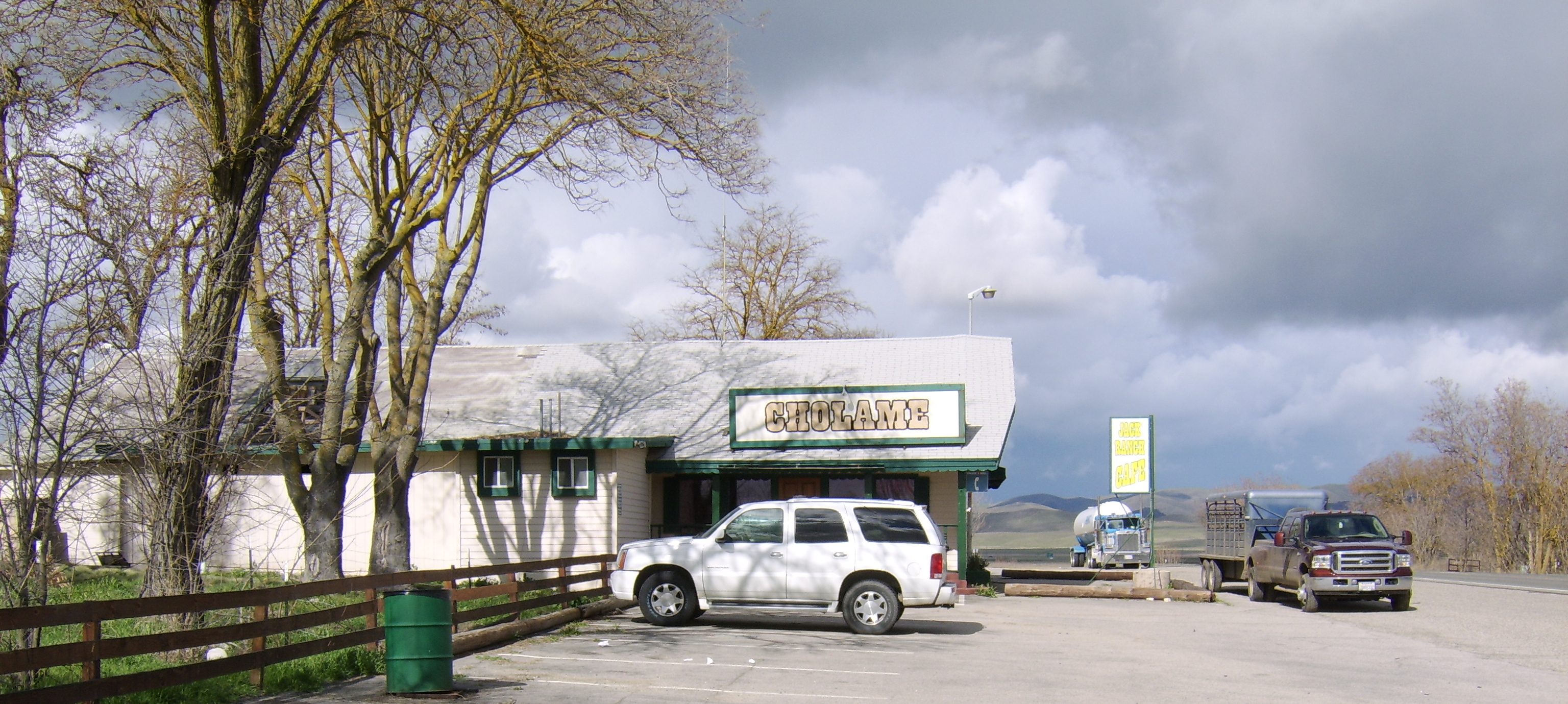
Cholame on State Route 46

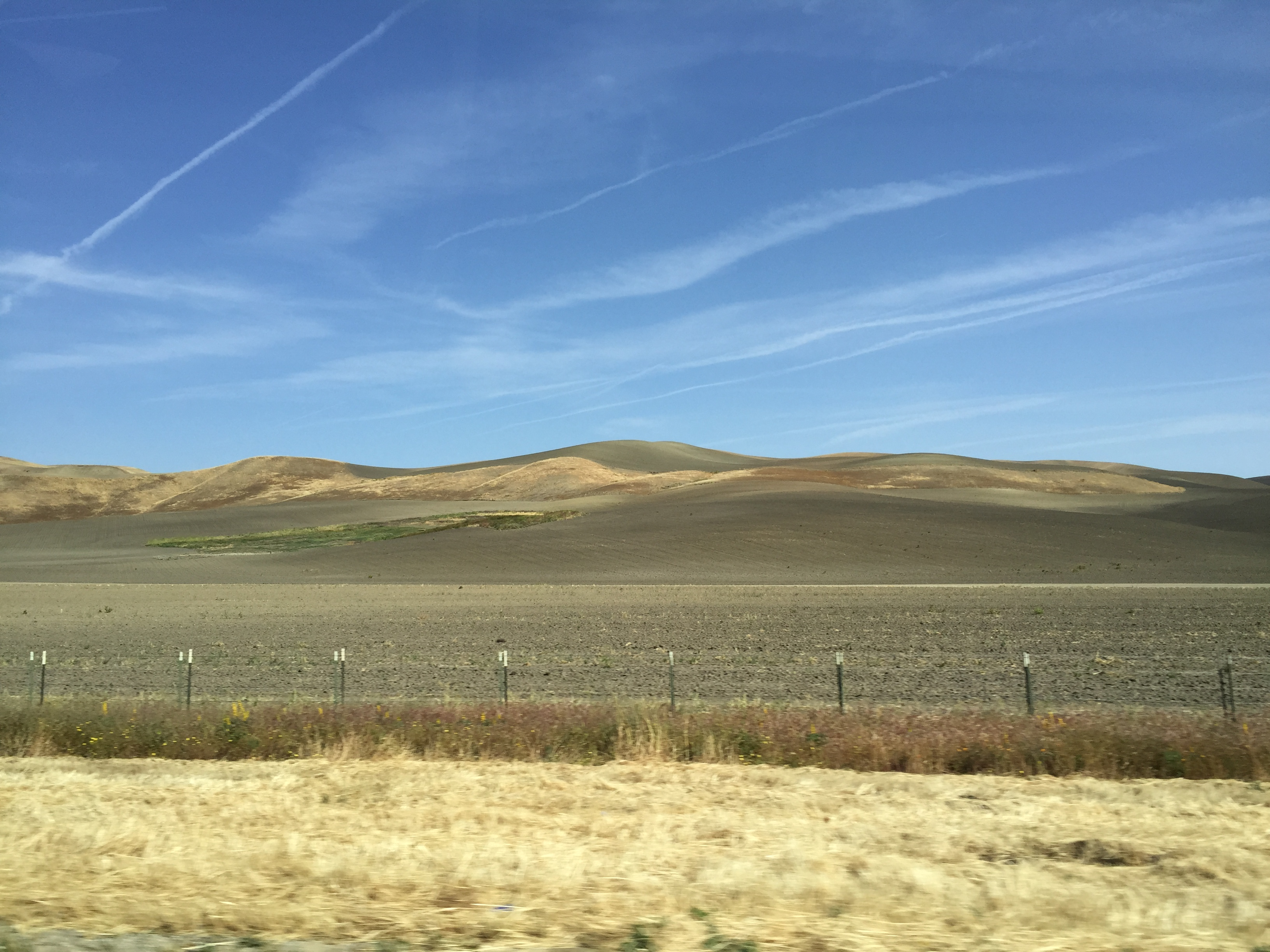
The Cholame Hills

Cholame lies in the Cholame Hills, which with Cholame Creek and the Cholame Valley carry the same name across San Luis Obispo and Monterey counties, in eastern San Luis Obispo County, within a mile of the San Andreas Fault, at an elevation of 1,157 feet (353 m). It is reached by State Route 41, just southwest of the junction with State Route 46. The area is dry, receiving roughly eight to nine inches (200–230 mm) of rain in a normal year.

=== Seismicity ===
The stretch of the San Andreas Fault beside the community is known to seismologists as the Cholame section. The 1857 Fort Tejon earthquake, of estimated magnitude 7.9, ruptured the fault from near Parkfield in the Cholame Valley southeast almost to Wrightwood, a distance of about 300 kilometres (186 mi), with horizontal displacement of as much as 9 metres (30 ft) measured on the Carrizo Plain. Slip on the Cholame section itself was estimated at 3 to 7 meters, less than along the Carrizo Plain to the southeast.
