= Alamo Solo Spring =

- Aguaje de Alamo Solo
- Location within California
- Interactive map of Alamo Solo Spring
- Location: Kern County, California
- Coordinates: 35°46′54″N 119°59′57″W

Alamo Solo Spring, (Lone Cottonwood Spring) a spring directly east of the Dagany Gap in the Pyramid Hills of Kern County, California. Its location appears on a 1914 USGS Topographic map of Lost Hills.

== History ==
Before the advent of the Spanish, Alamo Solo Spring was the site of a large Indian village covering about 100 acres. Alamo Solo Spring was considered one of the most reliable watering places on the route of El Camino Viejo in the San Joaquin Valley between Arroyo de las Garzas and Aguaje de la Brea. At Alamo Solo Spring the route of El Camino Viejo split, the main route continuing north to Arroyo de las Garzas and beyond and the other turned onto the eastern route of the Old Road that passed to the east at Alamo Mocho and on to follow the shore of Tulare Lake, proceeding northward across the Kings River to settlements on the Fresno Slough and San Joaquin River before it turned back to rejoin the main route at Arroyo de Panoche Grande.
