= Las Juntas =

Las Juntas may refer to:

- Las Juntas, Ambato, Catamarca, Argentina
- Las Juntas, Belén, Catamarca, Argentina
- Pueblo de las Juntas, California, United States
