= Bitterwater Creek (Buena Vista Lake) =

Bitterwater Creek Bitter Creek
- Bitterwater Creek (Lake Buena Vista)
- Etymology: Spanish
- Native name: Arroyo de Amargosa (Spanish)

Location
- Country: United States
- State: California
- Region: San Luis Obispo County, Kern County

Physical characteristics
- Source: source
  - location: just southwest of the southern extreme of the Elkhorn Hills, 6.3 miles southwest of Maricopa, California., San Louis Obispo County
  - coordinates: 34°59′47″N 119°28′51″W
- Mouth: mouth
  - location: dissipates in the dry lake bed of Buena Vista Lake, 3.7 miles north of Pentland., Kern County
  - coordinates: 35°06′50″N 119°21′01″W
  - elevation: 420 ft (130 m)

Bitterwater Creek, formerly Arroyo de Amargosa (Bitter Creek), is a stream with its source just southwest of the southern extreme of the Elkhorn Hills, just west of and inside the San Luis Obispo County boundary, 6.3 miles southwest of Maricopa, California. The creek flows northwest to dissipate in the dry lake bed of Buena Vista Lake, 3.7 miles north of Pentland, Kern County, California. In years of heavy rainfall it would be a tributary to Buena Vista Lake, which has been dry for many years due to agricultural diversion.

== History ==
Arroyo de Amargosa was a stream that provided a camping and watering place on El Camino Viejo at its "sink" near Maricopa, southwest of Buena Vista Lake, between Arroyo San Emigdio to the southeast and Aguaje de La Brea 20 miles to the northwest near McKittrick, California.
