= Mustang Creek =

Mustang Creek may refer to the following creeks:

- Mustang Creek (California)
- Mustang Creek (Johnson County), Texas
- Mustang Creek (Somervell County), a river in Texas

== See also ==
- Mustang (disambiguation)
