= Aguaje de Pedro Etchegoen =

Place in California, United States

Pedro Etchegoen Springs
- Interactive map of Pedro Etchegoen Springs
- Location: Fresno County, California, United States
- Coordinates: 36°18′40″N 120°18′24″W

Aguaje de Pedro Etchegoen was an aguaje (a watering place), a little to the west of El Camino Viejo eight miles north of Poso de Chane where Pedro Etchegoen later established his sheep ranch. It was the only reliable watering place between the Poso and Cantua Creek. The Etchegoen or Etchegoin Ranch remained in the hands of his family up until the time of the Fresno oil boom. A Fresno Township map of 1907 shows it in the hands of William Etchegoen.

The last owner of the ranch, John Etchegoin had sold out and it was part of the Coalinga Oil Field by 1910. The Etchegoin formation is named for the former sheep ranch, on which that formation is found. It is one of the primary oil bearing geological formations in the Southwestern San Joaquin Valley.

The location of the watering place is found in an arroyo just west of the Coalinga - Mendota Road, 1.9 miles north of its junction with California State Route 33.
