= El Camino Viejo =

Spanish colonial north-south inland trail in California

El Camino Viejo a Los Ángeles (English: the Old Road to Los Angeles), also known as El Camino Viejo and the Old Los Angeles Trail, was the oldest north-south trail in the interior of Spanish colonial Las Californias (1769–1822) and Mexican Alta California (1822–1848), present day California. It became a well established inland route, and an alternative to the coastal El Camino Real trail used since the 1770s in the period.

It ran from San Pedro Bay and the Pueblo de Los Ángeles, over the Transverse Ranges through Tejon Pass and down through the San Emigdio Mountains to the San Joaquin Valley, where it followed a route along the eastern slopes of the Coast Ranges between aguaje (watering places) and arroyos. It passed west out of the valley, over the Diablo Range at Corral Hollow Pass into the Livermore Valley, to end at the Oakland Estuary on the eastern San Francisco Bay.

== History ==
The route of El Camino Viejo was well established by the 1820s, and the route was in use by Spanish colonial "carretas" (ox carts) as early as 1780, as a more direct route than El Camino Real to the recently established Mission Santa Clara de Asís and Mission San Francisco de Asís. At that time the Bay Area section ran from the mouth of Arroyo Las Positas southwest across the mouth of the Arroyo Mocho and Arroyo Valle to Arroyo de la Laguna (later the lands of Rancho Valle de San Jose) and following it south down to its confluence with Arroyo de la Alameda (later location of Sunol). It then crossed the hills to the south via Mission Pass to the coastal plain and on until it reached Mission Santa Clara and the El Camino Real. The Los Angeles Area section left the El Camino Real in the San Fernando Valley,

Later, after the 1797 foundation of the Mission San José, the road was turned northward from there, crossing Arroyo de San Leandro and Arroyo de San Lorenzo to the anchorage in what is now the Oakland Estuary. There cargos could be ferried across to the Mission and Presidio of San Francisco or to other places on the bay more quickly and in more quantity than carriage by road.

This route along the unsettled frontier of Spanish colonial Las Californias—Alta California (1769–1822) came to be favored by those who wished to avoid the eyes of the Spanish authorities that were along the more settled coastal route of El Camino Real. Settlements like Las Juntas and Rancho Centinela (est. 1810), and later Poso de Chane and others began to grow up along the route of El Camino Viejo. Later Californio vaqueros made "El Camino Viejo" a well-known trail that connected Rancho San Antonio with the Pueblo de Los Ángeles. The vaqueros ran cattle and in the 1840s began establishing inland Mexican land grant ranchos along the route. Californio mesteñeros (wild horse catchers) also moved into the San Joaquin Valley to catch the mesteños (mustangs) that now roamed in the thousands, and held them in temporary corrals before herding them to the Bay Area, to Southern California, or to Sonora and other territories of northern Mexico for sale.

With the California Gold Rush a shortcut developed at the northern end of El Camino Viejo, as part of the Oakland to Stockton Road used by stagecoaches and teamsters. It ran from Oakland, east through the Castro Valley and Rancho San Ramon, to the San Joaquin Valley and Stockton.

== Route of El Camino Viejo ==
=== Alameda County ===
- Oakland Estuary
  - Rancho San Antonio (1820)
    - San Antonio (1850)
    - Clinton (1852)
      - Brooklyn (1856)
- Arroyo de San Leandro
  - Rancho San Leandro (1842)
    - San Leandro (1855)
- Arroyo de San Lorenzo
  - Rancho San Lorenzo (1841)
    - Squattersville (1849)
      - San Lorenzo (1854)
- Centreville (1855)
- Mission San José (1797)
  - Rancho Ex-Mission San José (1846)
    - Mission San José (1850)
- Mission Pass
- Diablo Range
- Arroyo de la Alameda
- Arroyo de la Laguna
  - Rancho Valle de San Jose (1839)
- Arroyo Valle
  - Rancho Santa Rita (1839)
    - Alisal (1844)
- Arroyo Mocho
- Arroyo Las Positas (The Little Springs Creek)
  - Rancho Las Positas (1839)
    - Livermore's, Livermore Ranch (1851)
- Arroyo Seco (Dry Creek)
- Portezuela de Buenos Ayres

=== San Joaquin County ===
- Arroyo de los Buenos Ayres (Creek of the Good Winds)
  - Corral Hollow (1848)
- Rancho Pescadero (Grimes) (1843)

=== Stanislaus County ===
- Arroyo del Ospital (Ospital Creek)
- Arroyo de La Puerta (Creek of the Door)
- Rancho Del Puerto (1844)
- Arroyo Salada Grande (Big Salt Creek)
- Arroyita Salada (Little Salt Creek)
- Arroyo Orestimba (Meetingplace Creek)
- Rancho Orestimba y Las Garzas (1844)

=== Merced County ===
- Arroyo de las Garzas (Creek of the Herons)
- Arroyo de Mesteño (Mustang Creek)
- Aguaje de Las Berendas (Waterhole of the Pronghorns)
- Arroyo de Quinto (Fifth Creek)
- Arroyo de Romero (Romero Creek)
- Rancho de Centinella (Sentinel Ranch)(1810)
- Arroyo de San Luis Gonzaga (Saint Luis Gonzaga Creek)
  - Rancho San Luis Gonzaga (1843)
- Arroyo de Los Baños (Creek of The Baths)
- Rancho Panoche de San Juan y Los Carrisolitos (1844)
- Arroyo de Las Ortigalito (Little Nettle Creek)

=== Fresno County ===
- Arroyita de Panoche or Arroyo de Pannochita (Little Sugarloaf Creek)
- Arroyo de Panoche Grande (Big Sugarloaf Creek) (northern junction with Eastern Route of El Camino Viejo)
- Arroyo de Cantúa (Cantua Creek)
  - Murrieta Spring
- Aguaje de Pedro Etchegoen (Pedro Etchegoen Watering Place)
- Arroyo Pasajero or Arroyo Poso de Chane (Traveler Creek or Chane Pool Creek)
  - Poso de Chane (Chane Pool)
- Arroyo de Jacelitos (Creek of Little Huts)
- Arroyo de Las Polvarduras (Creek of the Dust Storms)
- Arroyo de Zapata Chino (Chinese Shoe Creek)
- Arroyo de Las Canoas (Creek of the Troughs)

=== Kings County ===
- Arroyo de las Garzas (Creek of the Herons)

=== Kern County ===
- Alamo Solo Spring (Lone Cottonwood Spring) (southern junction with Eastern Route of El Camino Viejo)
- Aguaje La Brea (The Tar Watering Place)
- Las Tinajas de Los Indios (The Jars of the Indians)
- Arroyo de Matarano (Matarano Creek)
- Aguaje Del Diablo (Devil's Watering Place)
- Aguaje de en Media (Middle Watering Place)
- Arroyo de Los Carneros (Creek of the Rams)
- Arroyo Chico Martinez (Chico Martinez Creek)
  - Aguaje Mesteño (Mustang Watering Place)
- Aguaje de Los Temblores (Watering Place of the Earthquakes)
- Aguaje de Santa Maria (Watering Place of Saint Mary)
- Aguaje de La Brea (Watering Place of the Tar)
- Buena Vista Lake
- Arroyo de Amargosa (Bitter Creek)
- Rancho San Emidio (1842)
- Arroyo San Emigdio (Saint Emygdius Creek)
- San Emigdio Mountains
  - Cuddy Valley
  - Cuddy Canyon
- Tehachapi Mountains

=== Los Angeles County ===
El Camino Viejo in Los Angeles County
Interactive map of sites along the El Camino Viejo in Los Angeles County
- Rancho El Tejon (1843)
  - Portezuela de Cortes (Cortes Pass) (1772), Portezuela de Castac (Castac Pass) (1843), Fort Tejon Pass (1854), Tejon Pass.
- Rancho Los Alamos y Agua Caliente (1846)
- Kulshra’jek, Rancho la Viuda (1855), Reed's Ranch (1857), Gorman's Station (1867)
- Rancho La Liebre (1846)
- Cow Springs, French John's Station (1858)
- Aquaje Lodoso (Muddy Watering Place)
- Laguna de Chico Lopez, Elizabeth Lake
- Sierra Pelona Mountains
  - San Francisquito Pass
  - San Francisquito Creek
- Santa Clara River
- Rancho San Francisco (1839)
- San Gabriel Mountains
  - Fremont Pass, San Fernando Pass
- San Fernando Valley
  - Mission San Fernando Rey de España (1797-1846)
  - Rancho Ex-Mission San Fernando (1846)
  - Rancho Los Encinos
  - Rancho Providencia (1843)
- Santa Monica Mountains
  - Rancho Cahuenga (1843)
  - Cahuenga Pass
- Rancho Los Feliz (1792)
- Pueblo de Los Ángeles (est. 1781)
- Rancho San Pedro (1784)
- San Pedro Bay, at the harbor of Los Ángeles

== Eastern Route of El Camino Viejo ==
=== Fresno County ===
Arroyo de Panoche Grande (northern junction of El Camino Viejo with its Eastern Route)

- Rancho Laguna de Tache or "25" Ranch (1843)
- Pueblo de Las Juntas (1810)
- Rancho de Los Californios
- La Libertad

=== Kings County ===
- Whitmore's Ferry (1854)
  - Kingston (1859)
- Vaca Adobe (1863)
- Laguna de Tache, Tulare Lake
- Cox & Clark Trading Post and Steamboat Landing (1870)
- Alamo Mocho (Trimmed cottonwood)

=== Kern County ===
- Alamo Solo Spring (southern junction of El Camino Viejo with its Eastern Route)

== See also ==
- El Camino Real (California)
- Stockton – Los Angeles Road
- Butterfield Overland Mail
- History of California through 1899
- Bibliography of California history
