= Aguaje de Las Berendas =

Antelope Springs
- Location: Merced County, California, United States
- Coordinates: 37°10′35″N 121°03′58″W

Aguaje de Las Berendas, or Antelope Springs, is a spring in located on the west side of the San Joaquin Valley, at the foot of the foothills of the Diablo Range, in Merced County, California.

== History ==
Aguaje de Las Berendas (Waterhole of the Pronghorns), later called Antelope Springs, was as its name suggests, the site of a waterhole used by Pronghorn, Elk, and other wild game. Indian mortars, and other evidence have been found that show a hill to the north of this vicinity was once used as an Indian encampment. Later it was a watering place on El Camino Viejo, between Arroyo de Mesteño to the north and the Arroyo de Quinto to the south.
