= Aguaje =

Aguaje is a Spanish word that may refer to:

== Related to water ==
- Aguaje (geographic locale), a natural water feature or well that provides water for people and livestock
- an ocean current
- a wake
- a fresh water supply

== Other uses ==
- Aguaje Canyon, Colorado, U.S.
- El Aguaje, Durango, Mexico; see Durango state highways
- Mauritia flexuosa, a palm known as aguaje in Peru
- Jesús "Aguaje" Ramos (born 1951), Cuban trombonist
