= Mustang (disambiguation) =

A mustang is a free-ranging horse of the American West.

Mustang may also refer to:

== Aircraft ==
- North American P-51 Mustang, an American World War II fighter
  - North American F-82 Twin Mustang, an American military fighter
  - ScaleWings SW51 Mustang, a 70%-sized P-51 replica
  - Titan T-51 Mustang, a 75%-sized P-51 replica
- Cessna Citation Mustang, a modern business jet
- Mustang Aeronautics Midget Mustang, a homebuilt sportsplane
  - Mustang Aeronautics Mustang II, a two-seat homebuilt sportsplane

== Land vehicles ==
- Ford Mustang, a line of U.S. "pony cars"
  - Shelby Mustang, a high performance variant series of the Ford Mustang
- Hulas Mustang, an SUV from Hulas Motors
- KAMAZ Mustang, a line of Russian tactical trucks
- Jawa 50/23 Mustang, a 1969 lightweight motorcycle manufactured by Jawa Moto
- Polaris Mustang, a 1965 snowmobile model from Polaris Industries
- Mustang (motorcycle), a manufacturer of lightweight motorcycles

== Ships ==
- Mustang (brogan), a Chesapeake Bay brogan built in 1907
- USS Mustang (SP-36), a United States Navy patrol vessel in commission from 1917 to 1919
- USS Mustang (IX-155), a United States Navy wooden schooner in commission from 1944 to 1946
- USCGC Mustang, a US Coast Guard patrol vessel commissioned in 1986

== Geography ==
- Mustang District, Nepal
- Mustang, Oklahoma, United States, a city
- Mustang, Texas, United States, a town
- Mustang Peak (disambiguation), various summits in the United States
- Mustang Creek (disambiguation), various streams in the United States

== Arts and entertainment ==
=== Music ===
- Fender Mustang, an electric guitar brand from Fender
- Mustang (Curtis Amy album)
- Mustang! (Donald Byrd album)
- Mustang! (Dragon Ash album)
- Mustang (Electric Six album)
- "The Mustang", by David Gates from the album The David Gates Songbook
- The Mustangs, a British blues rock band
- Los Mustang, a Spanish rock band

=== Films ===
- Mustang! (film), a 1959 western film directed by Tom Gries
- Mustang (film), a 2015 Turkish-language French film directed by Deniz Gamze Ergüven
- The Mustang, a 2019 film directed by Laure de Clermont-Tonnerre

=== Fictional elements ===
- Roy Mustang, a character from the anime/manga series Fullmetal Alchemist
- Mustangs FC, a fictional soccer team from the Australian TV show Mustangs FC

=== Other arts and entertainment ===
- Mustangs (game), a 1991 board game
- "Mustang", a poem by Patti Smith from her 1973 book Witt

== Sports teams ==
=== Canada ===
- Calgary Mustangs (ice hockey), a junior "A" ice hockey team in Calgary, Alberta
- Calgary Mustangs (CPSL), a defunct professional soccer team from 1983
- Calgary Mustangs (USL), a defunct professional soccer team from 2001 to 2004
- Melfort Mustangs, a junior "A" ice hockey team in Melfort, Saskatchewan
- Williams Lake Mustangs, a defunct junior ice hockey team based in Williams Lake, British Columbia
- Western Ontario Mustangs, the athletics teams of the University of Western Ontario

=== United States ===
- Billings Mustangs, a minor league baseball team in Billings, Montana
- Cal Poly Mustangs, the athletics teams of California Polytechnic State University
- Chicago Mustangs (1967–68), an American professional soccer team based in Chicago, Illinois, in the 1967 and 1968 seasons
- Chicago Mustangs (PASL), an American professional indoor soccer team awarded a franchise in 2012
- Lone Star Mustangs, a Women's Football Alliance team
- Martinsville Mustangs, a baseball team in the Coastal Plain League, a collegiate summer baseball league
- Phoenix Mustangs, a former professional minor league ice hockey team
- Rochester Mustangs, a defunct senior ice hockey team from Rochester, Minnesota
- SMU Mustangs, the athletics teams of Southern Methodist University
- Washington Mustangs, a defunct soccer team based in Washington, D.C.

=== Elsewhere ===
- Melbourne Mustangs, a semi-professional ice hockey team in Docklands, Victoria, Australia
- Doncaster Mustangs (American football), based in Doncaster, England

== Other uses ==
- Mustang (military officer), slang for an American military officer who rises from the enlisted ranks
- Task Force Mustang, the deployment unit name for the Combat Aviation Brigade, 36th Infantry Division, Texas Army National Guard
- MUSTANG (camera), a bolometer camera for the Green Bank Telescope
- Mustang Software, a business that developed the Wildcat! bulletin board system software
- Mustang Ranch, first licensed brothel in Nevada
- Mustang, codename of a version of Java (software platform) SE 6
- Mustang (advertisement), a 2004 advertising campaign promoting Guinness
- Vitis mustangensis, a species of grape commonly known as the mustang grape
- Mustang wine, a wine from Texas, United States made with mustang grapes

== See also ==
- Mustang Sally (disambiguation)
- Upper Mustang, former Kingdom of Lo
- Mastung (disambiguation), places in Pakistan
