= Devilwater Creek =

- Etymology: Spanish
- Native name: Aguaje Del Diablo (Spanish)

Location
- Country: United States
- State: California
- Region: Kern County

Physical characteristics
- Source: source
  - location: on the east slope of the Temblor Range., Kern County
  - coordinates: 35°28′42″N 119°56′30″W
- Mouth: mouth
  - location: at a point just west of Media Aqua Creek., Kern County
  - coordinates: 35°31′18″N 119°53′40″W
  - elevation: 997 ft (304 m)

Devilwater Creek, originally Arroyo Del Diablo, a stream with its source on the east slope of the Temblor Range in Kern County, California, that flows northeast to terminate just a mile west southwest of the mouth of Media Aqua Creek. It was officially named Devilwater Creek in 1909.

== History ==
Aguaje Del Diablo (Devil's Watering Place) was an aguaje or watering place on El Camino Viejo along the Arroyo del Diablo in the foothills on the east slope of the Temblor Range between Arroyo de Los Carneros in the south and Arroyo de Matarano to the north.
