= Griswold Creek =

Stream in San Benito County, California, U.S.

Coordinates: 36°35′00″N 120°48′38″W

Griswold Creek is a stream in San Benito County, California. Its head is at the confluence of Pimental Creek and Vallecitos Creek. From there it flows north-northeastward through the canyon between the Griswold Hills in the east, and Buck Peak in the Diablo Range on the west, to its mouth, located at an elevation of 1,145 feet (349 m) at its confluence with Panoche Creek 1.5 miles (2.4 km) southeast of Panoche in the Panoche Valley.
