= Poso de Chane, California =

Coordinates: 36.15818°N 120.24596°W

Poso de Chane or Poso Chane (Chane Pool) is a former settlement in Fresno County, California, United States, situated around the waterhole of that name, northwest and just below the confluence of the Jacalitos Creek with Los Gatos Creek, 6 miles (9.7 km) east of Coalinga and northwest of the Guijarral Hills.

== History ==
The Poso de Chane, was a pool or waterhole on Los Gatos Creek, originally Arroyo Pasajero or Arroyo Poso de Chane, northwest of the Guijarral Hills.

This pool and a surrounding ciénaga of several acres, was once the site of a village of Native Americans called the "Chane" by the Spanish and "Udjiu" by the Native Americans. This location became a Spanish and later a Mexican agricultural settlement of about a dozen families, the only settlement in the area and a way station on El Camino Viejo. The Huiguera brothers became important mesteñeros in the vicinity and Juan Huiguera settled in the Poso in 1854 raising cattle between the Poso and Tulare Lake. Later American settlers came and built stores and houses there also.

The Poso de Chane was a hub of trails, besides the Old Road, that linked those from the Salinas, San Juan and Santa Clara Valleys with those in the wilds of the San Joaquin Valley like Pueblo de Las Juntas, Rancho de los Californios and Rio Bravo. The Poso also became an important stop at the end of the La Vereda del Monte, (The Mountain Path), was used by mesteñeros, to move their herds of mesteños or mustangs, southward from Point of Timber in eastern Contra Costa County, through Livermore Valley, then through the remote regions of the Diablo Range to end at the Pozo. From there mustangs were driven southward on various routes of La Vereda del Caballo through Southern California and across the Colorado and Altar Deserts into Sonora, Mexico.

Following the American conquest of California and the California Gold Rush, horse and cattle thieves used the Vereda for herding stolen cattle and horses to markets north and south. The trail was also a favored route of bandits and other outlaws for moving unobserved. The scattered small settlements along the route becoming their refuges, the Poso being the most notorious.

The Poso de Chane was destroyed in the Great Flood of 1862, when a deep channel was cut draining the pool. The surrounding land, gardens, vines and trees died, turning it into a desolate location to be supplied with water only by digging wells. The settlement lingered, for a time as a center for sheepmen and sheepshearing, into the 1870s.

In 1875, Gustave Kreyenhagen, came to Poso and started a small store and hotel there. At that time there were only a half-dozen American families living there. The rest were Californios or Mexicans living mostly in the mountains or in stockmen's camps at the few watering places. He also went into the sheep and cattle business building a sheep-shearing station that handled as many as 150,000 sheep in the public corral. Gustave was also the first to begin raising grain on the west side of the San Joaquin Valley in Fresno County. His sons, raised working on the land owned by Gustave, went into the cattle business, forming their own company Kreyenhagens, Incorporated, that became the largest cattle company in Fresno county. They raised both sheep and cattle, but later gave up sheep and only raised cattle south of Coalinga.
