= Garzas Creek =

- Etymology: Spanish
- Native name: Arroyo de las Garzas (Spanish)

Location
- Country: United States
- State: California
- Region: Merced County

Physical characteristics
- Source
  - location: head 0.8 km (0.5 mi) south of Hog Canyon and 1.6 km (1 mi) northwest of Bullhead Reservoir
  - coordinates: 37°10′31″N 121°19′44″W
  - elevation: 1,550 ft (470 m)
- Mouth: Los Banos Creek
  - location: 4.8 km (3 mi) northeast of Ingomar
  - coordinates: 37°13′20″N 120°56′49″W
  - elevation: 79 ft (24 m)

Garzas Creek, originally Arroyo de las Garzas (Creek of the Herons), is a tributary of the San Joaquin River draining the eastern slopes of part of the Diablo Range within the San Joaquin Valley of California.

The Creek has its source 0.8 km (0.5 mi) south of Hog Canyon and 1.6 km (1 mi) northwest of Bullhead Reservoir, and its mouth at the confluence with Los Banos Creek 4.8 km (3 mi) northeast of Ingomar in Merced County. The closest populated place was the former settlement and railroad station of Linora that is 0.38 miles south of Garzas Creek. The town of Gustine, is 4.35 miles from Garzas Creek.

== History ==
Arroyo de las Garzas was a watering place on El Camino Viejo in the San Joaquin Valley and its first settler was a deserter from the Spanish cavalry in 1820. Later the same year, Spanish cavalry attempting to recover the deserter and a group of fugitive neophytes from the missions, fought an action with them. In 1852, American pioneers found the mestizo son of the Spanish deserter living in an adobe house on Arroyo de las Garzas several miles west of what is now Gustine just over the county line in Madera County.

The creek was the water source for the southern part of Rancho Orestimba y Las Garzas. Jesse Hill one of the owners of Hills Ferry built a house on Garzas Creek. It was a frame house built with lumber shipped around Cape Horn and hauled to the site with oxen. The location was later a sheep camp for the Simon Newman Company.
