= Canoas Creek (Fresno County, California) =

- Location of the mouth in California
- Native name: Arroyo de Las Canoas (Spanish)

Location
- Country: United States
- State: California
- Region: Fresno County

Physical characteristics
- Source: source
  - location: on the north slope of Black Mountain, 1.25 miles west of Zwang Peak in the Diablo Range., Fresno County
  - coordinates: 35°56′38″N 120°16′34″W
- Mouth: mouth
  - location: terminates in the Kettleman Plain, 6.2 miles northwest of Avenal, Fresno County
  - coordinates: 36°04′45″N 120°12′55″W
  - elevation: 692 ft (211 m)

Canoas Creek formerly known as Arroyo de Las Canoas (Creek of the Troughs) is a creek in Fresno County, California. Its source is on the north slope of Black Mountain, 1.25 miles west of Zwang Peak in the Diablo Range. Its course, in its canyon, runs almost directly northeast through Reef Ridge and the Kreyenhagen Hills, from which it flows north northeast into the Kettleman Plain where it turns north northwest 4.6 miles northwest of Avenal near the Kettleman Hills to terminate in the Kettleman Plain, 7.1 miles northwest of Avenal and 3000 feet east of Zapato Chino Creek.

== History ==
Canoas Creek, originally known as Arroyo de Las Canoas, was the location of a watering place on El Camino Viejo, between Zapato Chino Creek to the north and Arroyo de las Garzas to the south.
