= Santa Nella, California =

- Census designated place
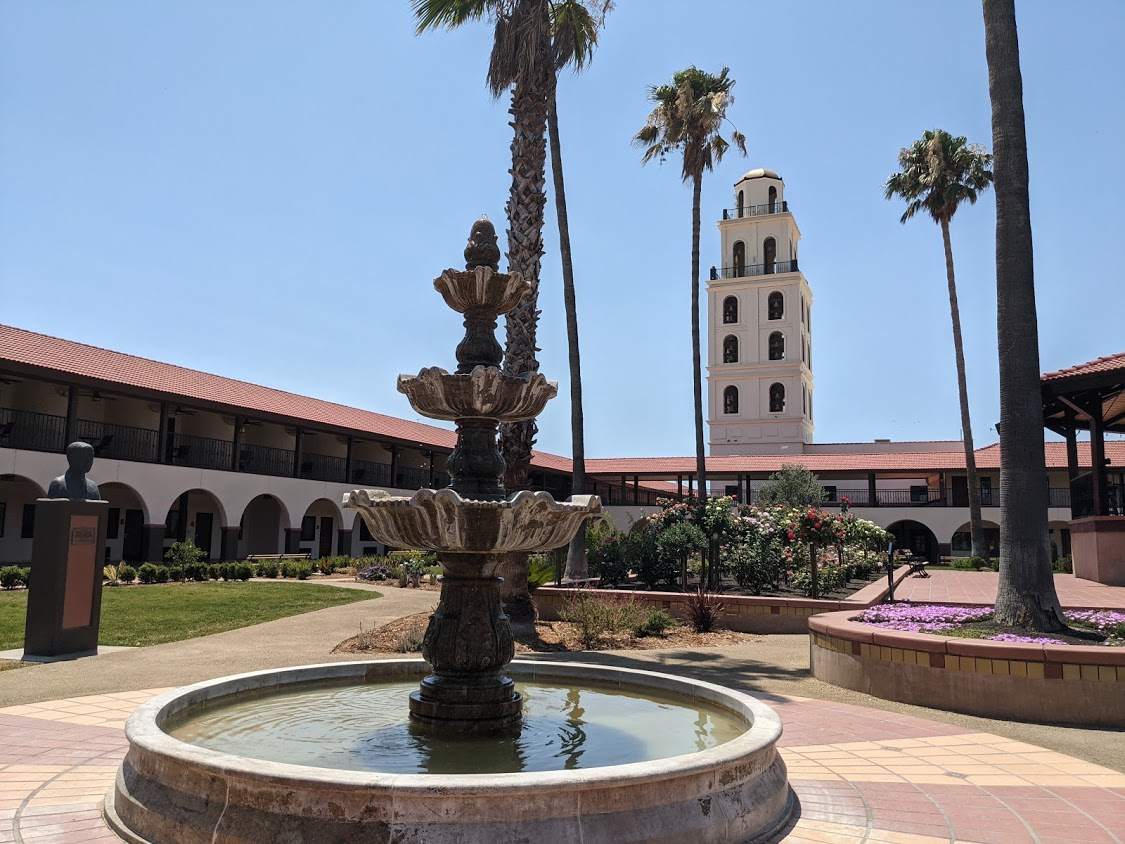
- Hotel Mission de Oro

- Location in California Santa Nella (the United States)
- Coordinates: 37°05′52″N 121°01′01″W
- Country: United States
- State: California
- County: Merced
- Named for: An English language corruption of the Spanish word centinela ("sentinel")

Area
  - Total: 4.683 sq mi (12.129 km^{2})
  - Land: 4.683 sq mi (12.129 km^{2})
  - Water: 0 sq mi (0 km^{2}) 0%
- Elevation: 154 ft (47 m)

Population (2020)
  - Total: 2,211
  - Density: 472.1/sq mi (182.3/km^{2})
- Time zone: UTC-8 (Pacific)
  - Summer (DST): UTC-7 (PDT)
- ZIP code: 95322
- Area code: 209
- GNIS feature IDs: 1659597, 2583129

Santa Nella is an unincorporated area and census-designated place (CDP) in Merced County, California, United States. It is located 10 miles (16 km) west-northwest of Los Banos at an elevation of 154 feet (47 m). As of the 2020 census, Santa Nella had a population of 2,211, up from 1,380 at the 2010 census.

The site's status as a stopping place for travelers dates back to the 19th century when it was Rancho de Centinela (Spanish for "Sentinel Ranch") along El Camino Viejo; the route through the community has since been replaced by Interstate 5 and State Route 33.

== Etymology ==
The name does not refer to a saint, as there is no saint named "Nella". The name is an English language corruption of the Spanish word centinela ("sentinel"), referring to the earlier Centinela Adobe that was located in the vicinity.

== History ==
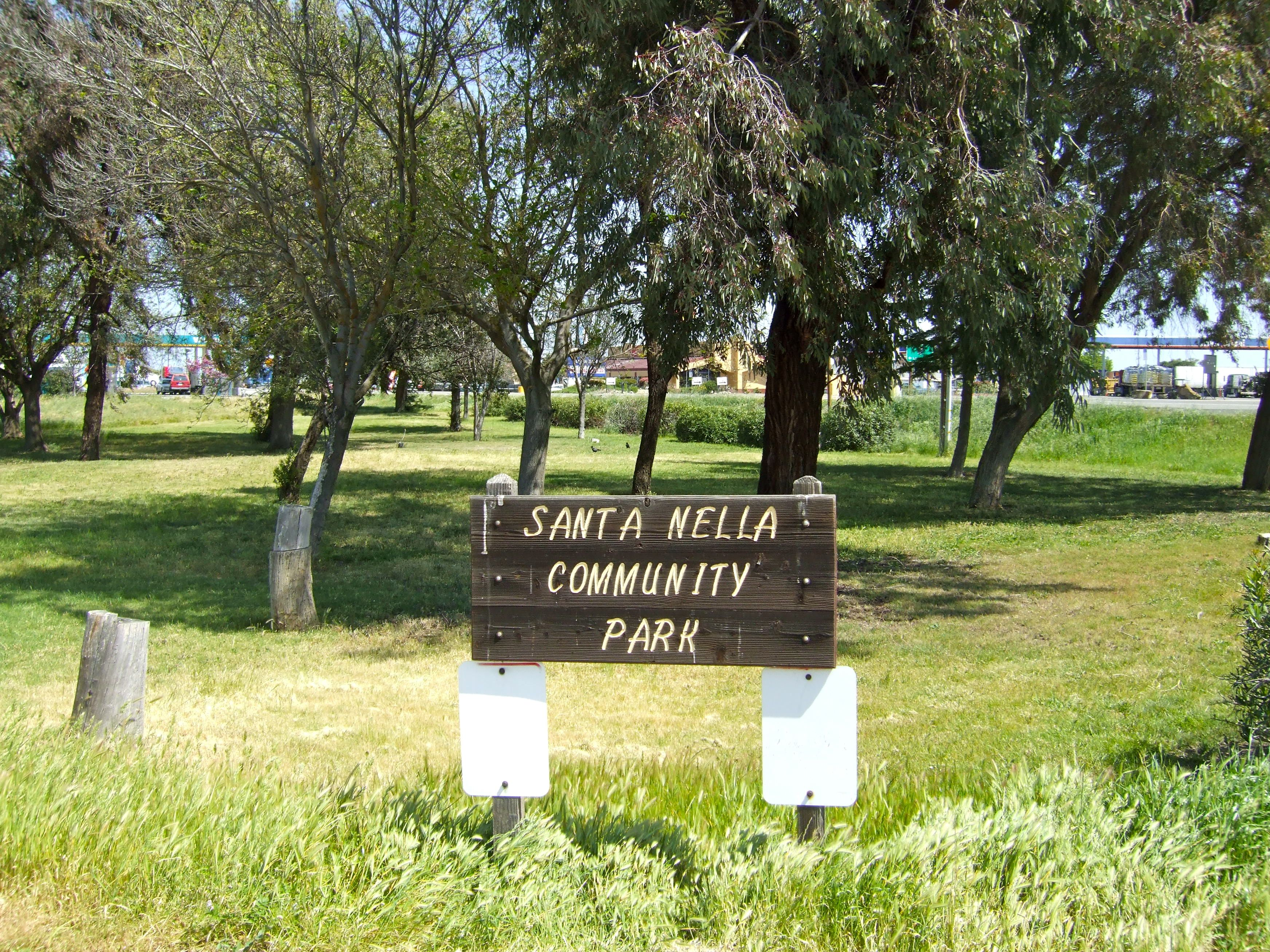
County park in Santa Nella

Santa Nella began as the site of Rancho de Centinela (Sentinel Ranch) first established by pioneering stockmen from San Juan Bautista and Monterey as a place to raise horses in 1810. The former Centinela Adobe, a one-story adobe built as living quarters for the ranch, was located on El Camino Viejo a Los Ángeles about 3 miles (5 km) downstream from the site of the later San Luis Adobe (now under the San Luis Reservoir), at the east end of the Pacheco Pass road, situated on the south bank of Arroyo de San Luis Gonzaga. The escape of many of the horses into the valley and subsequent Indian hostilities made the enterprise a failure.

The land and adobe of this old Spanish ranch was included in the Rancho San Luis Gonzaga in 1843. From the time of the California Gold Rush the stage road from Hill's Ferry crossed San Luis Creek at Centinella on the way to connect with the Pacheco Pass road at Rancho San Luis. The old Centinela ranch became a stopping place for stages and travelers on El Camino Viejo. Later a two-story adobe house was constructed near the old adobe by Basque sheepmen in the 1860s and a wooden barn in the 1870s. The two-story adobe was subsequently torn down in the 1890s and replaced by a frame house built by Miller and Lux. This house and barn were for a long time local landmarks. However, by 1966, the wooden house and barn had been removed and a roadside stop built on the site along State Route 33. The name of the place had been corrupted into Santa Nella.

The community was entered into the Geographic Names Information System in 1981 as "Santa Nella Village". In 2010, it became a census-designated place under the "Santa Nella" name.

== Geography ==
Santa Nella is in western Merced County, on the western edge of California's Central Valley. Interstate 5 passes through the north side of the community, with access from Exit 407 (California State Route 33). I-5 leads north 66 miles (106 km) to Stockton and southeast 160 miles (260 km) to the Bakersfield area. State Route 33 leads north from Santa Nella 11 miles (18 km) to Gustine and southeast 12 miles (19 km) to Los Banos.

According to the United States Census Bureau, the Santa Nella CDP covers an area of 4.7 square miles (12 km^{2}), all land.

The San Joaquin Valley National Cemetery, including the California Korean War Veterans Memorial, is located to the west of Santa Nella, on McCabe Road. Nearby attractions also include the San Luis Reservoir and Forebay Golf Course.

== Transportation ==
Interstate 5 intersects with State Route 33 in Santa Nella. State Route 152, a major east–west highway connecting nearby Los Banos with the Santa Clara Valley, runs south of town.

Santa Nella is served by public Dial-A-Ride from Merced County's The Bus. The service connects Santa Nella with Gustine, Los Banos, Dos Palos, and other communities on the west side of Merced County.

== Economy ==
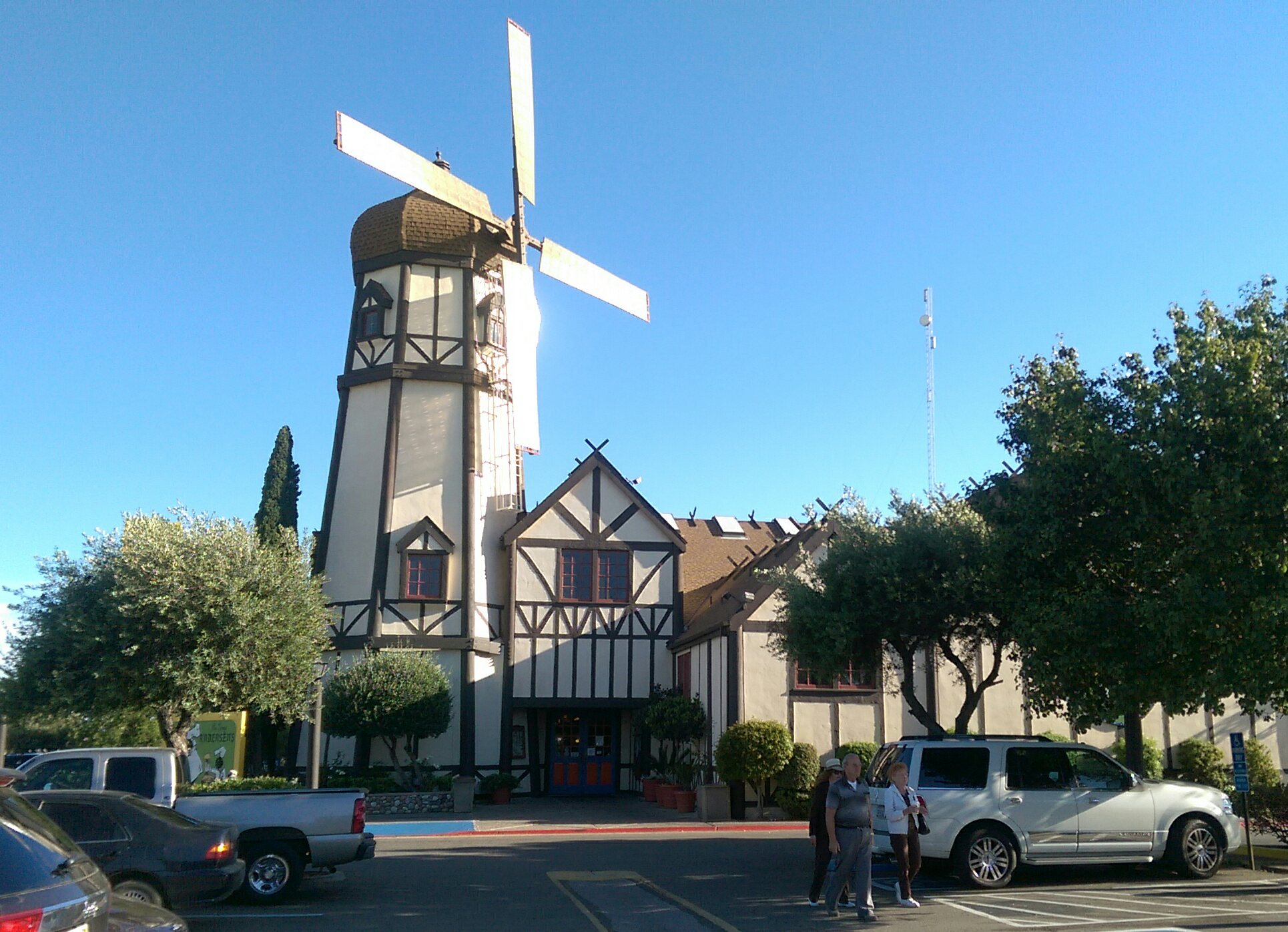
Pea Soup Andersen's restaurant in Santa Nella

Santa Nella is a major stopping point along the Interstate 5 corridor for those traveling between Los Angeles and either the San Francisco Bay Area or Sacramento, with various fast food outlets, motels, and gas stations.

== Demographics ==
Historical population
Census	Pop.	Note	%±
2010	1,380		—
2020	2,211		60.2%
U.S. Decennial Census; 1850–1870 1880-1890; 1900 1910 1920; 1930 1940 1950; 1960 1970 1980; 1990 2000 2010

=== 2020 census ===
As of the 2020 census, Santa Nella had a population of 2,211 and a population density of 472.1 inhabitants per square mile (182.3/km^{2}). The median age was 31.2 years. For every 100 females, there were 108.6 males, and for every 100 females age 18 and over, there were 109.9 males age 18 and over.

The age distribution was 712 people (32.2%) under the age of 18, 204 people (9.2%) aged 18 to 24, 560 people (25.3%) aged 25 to 44, 562 people (25.4%) aged 45 to 64, and 173 people (7.8%) who were 65 years of age or older.

Racial composition as of the 2020 census
Race	Number	Percent
White	646	29.2%
Black or African American	35	1.6%
American Indian and Alaska Native	68	3.1%
Asian	113	5.1%
Native Hawaiian and Other Pacific Islander	6	0.3%
Some other race	972	44.0%
Two or more races	371	16.8%
Hispanic or Latino (of any race)	1,649	74.6%

The census reported that 2,185 people (98.8% of the population) lived in households, 26 (1.2%) lived in non-institutionalized group quarters, and no one was institutionalized. In the place's geographic area, 0.0% of residents lived in urban areas and 100.0% lived in rural areas.

There were 607 households, out of which 287 (47.3%) had children under the age of 18 living in them, 316 (52.1%) were married-couple households, 58 (9.6%) were cohabiting couple households, 115 (18.9%) had a female householder with no spouse or partner present, and 118 (19.4%) had a male householder with no spouse or partner present. About 105 households (17.3%) were one-person households, and 51 (8.4%) were one-person households with someone aged 65 or older. The average household size was 3.6. There were 484 families (79.7% of all households).

There were 627 housing units at an average density of 133.9 units per square mile (51.7 units/km^{2}), of which 607 (96.8%) were occupied. Of these, 380 (62.6%) were owner-occupied, and 227 (37.4%) were occupied by renters. Of all housing units, 3.2% were vacant; the homeowner vacancy rate was 0.0%, and the rental vacancy rate was 2.1%.

=== 2010 census ===
Santa Nella first appeared as a census designated place in the 2010 U.S. census.

== Government ==
In the California State Legislature, Santa Nella is in the 14th senatorial district, represented by Democrat Anna Caballero, and in the 27th Assembly district, represented by Democrat Esmeralda Soria.

In the United States House of Representatives, Santa Nella is in California's 13th congressional district, represented by Democrat Adam Gray.

== See also ==
- List of places in California
