= Bitterwater Creek =

- Location of the mouth of Bitterwater Creek in California
- Etymology: Spanish
- Native name: Arroyo de Matarano (Spanish)

Location
- Country: United States
- State: California
- Region: San Luis Obispo County, Kern County

Physical characteristics
- Source: source
  - coordinates: 35°27′32″N 120°00′48″W
- Source confluence: confluence
  - location: Walnut Creek and Yeguas Creek confluence., San Luis Obispo County
  - coordinates: 35°27′32″N 120°00′48″W
  - elevation: 2,231 ft (680 m)
- Mouth: mouth
  - location: Antelope Valley (Kern County), Kern County
  - coordinates: 35°38′30″N 119°57′03″W
  - elevation: 735 ft (224 m)

Basin features
- Tributaries
  - left: Ceder Canyon Creek

Bitterwater Creek, originally named Arroyo de Matarano ("Matarano Creek" in Spanish), is a stream in eastern San Luis Obispo County and northwestern Kern County, central California.

== Geography ==
The creek's source located at the confluence of Walnut Creek and Yeguas Creek in San Luis Obispo County, west of the Temblor Range and east of the Carrizo Plain in the San Andreas Fault rift zone. It flows northwest in the rift zone, then northeast through the Temblor Range and passing south of the Shale Hills, into Antelope Valley 4 miles southeast of Point of Rocks.

== History ==
Arroyo de Matarano was a water stop on the 19th century El Camino Viejo in Alta California, between the stops of Aguaje Del Diablo to the south and Las Tinajas de Los Indios to the north, and east of Point of Rocks.

This stream was named for Juan Matarano, a well known mid 19th century Mexican Californio mesteñero or "mustang runner" of the west side of the southern San Joaquin Valley region.

The Corral de Matarano was named after him, and lay below the mouth of the Arroyo. It was in a sandstone formation that made a natural stone corral. Openings in the enclosure were blocked by man made low stone walls, and was used to corral horses, cattle and sheep. Water at the corral could usually only be found upstream 8 miles to the west at Ceder Canyon, a mile more distant than the water at Las Tinajas de Los Indios.

The name Arroyo de Matarano was officially changed to Bitterwater Creek, for the taste of its waters, in March 1909 by the U.S. Board on Geographic Names.
