= Salt Spring =

- Aguaje La Brea (Spanish)
- Location within California
- Interactive map of Salt Spring
- Name origin: Spanish
- Location: Kern County, California, United States
- Coordinates: 35°43′50″N 119°59′07″W
- Elevation: 509 m (1,670 ft)
- Type: Spring
- USGS topo map: Emigrant Hill

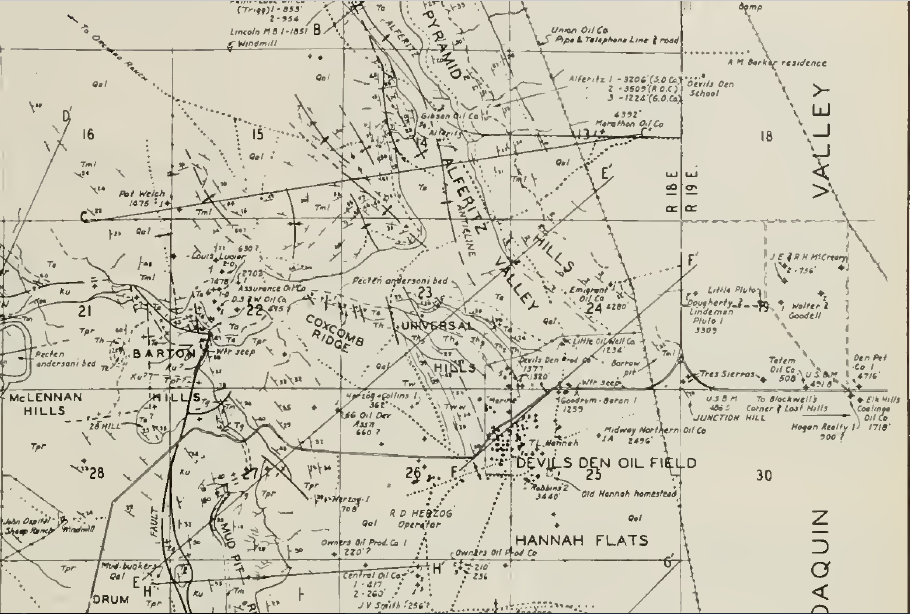
Devils Den District Map

Salt Spring, originally, Aguaje de la Brea (tar springs), a spring in the Antelope Plain on the southeast end of Pyramid Hills, 0.6 miles south of Emigrant Hill and 1.5 miles north of Wagon Wheel Mountain in the Pyramid Hills of Kern County, California. Its location appears on a 1914 USGS Topographic map of Lost Hills. Salt Spring is located just east of the Pyramid Hills and the Devils Den Oil Field, 3 miles southwest of Devils Den, close by the south side of Kecks Road, 0.23 miles east of the California Aqueduct, enclosed by a fence.

== History ==
Aguaje de la Brea was one of the watering places on the route of El Camino Viejo in the San Joaquin Valley between Alamo Solo Spring to the north and Las Tinajas de Los Indios to the south. At the Aguaje de la Brea, oil covered the water of the spring deceiving many thirsty wayfarers, who passed by thinking it only a pool of oil.
