= Cottonwood Creek (San Luis Creek tributary) =

Cottonwood Creek Arroyo Alamo
- Location of the mouth of Cottonwood Creek at San Luis Reservoir in California
- Etymology: Spanish

Location
- Country: United States
- State: California
- Region: Merced County

Physical characteristics
- Source: source
  - location: Red Hill, eastern slope of the Diablo Range, north of Pacheco Pass, Merced County
  - coordinates: 37°07′29″N 121°11′24″W
  - elevation: 2,080 ft (630 m)
- Mouth: mouth
  - location: Confluence with San Luis Reservoir, Merced County
  - coordinates: 37°06′18″N 121°07′57″W
  - elevation: 548 ft (167 m)

Cottonwood Creek is a southeastward-flowing 4 mi (6.4 km) tributary stream of San Luis Creek, originating in the eastern foothills of the Diablo Range in Merced County, California. The creek's mouth, before the San Luis Dam was built across the course of San Luis Creek, was originally at its confluence with San Luis Creek at approximately 250 ft (76 m). Today, Cottonwood Creek enters San Luis Reservoir, which raises the elevation of the creek's mouth to 548 ft (167 m), where it becomes Cottonwood Bay on the north side of the reservoir. The source of the creek is at Red Hill, a summit on the eastern slope of the Diablo Range.

== History ==
Cottonwood Creek, originally named by the Spanish Arroyo Alamos, was named for the Fremont cottonwood (Populus fremontii) trees which are still abundant along the lower creek.

== Ecology and Conservation ==
The Upper and Lower Cottonwood Creek Wildlife Areas are administered by the California Department of Fish and Wildlife (CDFW) and bracket the historic mouth of Cottonwood Creek, now submerged as Cottonwood Bay on San Luis Reservoir. This area is now home to a herd of tule elk, visible from the Pacheco Pass (Highway 152), which was dispersed there from 1978 to 1981 through CDFW translocations of the large ungulates to the Hewlett-Packard San Felipe Ranch on Mt. Hamilton in Santa Clara County.

== See also ==
- San Luis Reservoir
