= Temblor Creek =

- Etymology: Spanish
- Native name: Arroyo de Los Temblores (Spanish)

Location
- Country: United States
- State: California
- Region: Kern County

Physical characteristics
- Source
  - location: On the east slope of the Temblor Range., Kern County, Kern County
  - coordinates: 35°21′22″N 119°49′25″W
- Mouth: mouth
  - location: its confluence with Salt Creek in the Temblor Valley., Kern County
  - coordinates: 35°23′26″N 119°45′57″W
  - elevation: 1,086 ft (331 m)

Temblor Creek, formerly Arroyo de Los Temblores (Creek of the earthquakes), is a stream with its source on the east slope of the Temblor Range, California, United States. It flows east-northeast to its confluence with Salt Creek in the Temblor Valley, 44 miles west of Bakersfield in Kern County, California.

== History ==
Aguaje de Los Temblores (Watering place of the Earthquakes) was a watering place in the foothills of the Temblor Valley along the Arroyo de Los Temblores on the route of El Camino Viejo between Aguaje de Santa Maria and Arroyo Chico Martinez. The Aguaje de Los Temblores were springs created by earthquakes issued from the floor of the canyon where the Temblor Ranch was later located.
