= Black Mountain (Fresno County, California) =

Mountain ridge in Fresno County, California

- Location within California

Highest point
- Elevation: 4,345 ft (1,324 m) NAVD 88
- Coordinates: 35°56′25″N 120°19′16″W

Geography
- Location: Fresno County, California, U.S.
- Parent range: Diablo Range
- Topo map: USGS The Dark Hole

Black Mountain, is a ridge in the Diablo Range of southwestern Fresno County, California, south of Reef Ridge. Its east end begins about 1.25 miles west of Zwang Peak, and runs at elevations over 4000 feet, with the mid ridge rising to 4345 feet, westerly about 3.25 miles to Castle Mountain at an elevation of 4343 feet. It then turns west northwest 2 miles at elevations above 3790 feet with several peaks over 3800 feet and one over 3900 feet along the length of it. There it is linked to the next east west mountain ridge extending east from Mustang Peak. The high point of the ridge is 7.7 miles (12.4 km) north northeast of Parkfield, California.

The crest of the Black Mountain Ridge from Castle Mountain to the Mustang Peak ridge and extending west along that ridge is the boundary line between Fresno County and Monterey County and the watershed of the San Joaquin Valley.

The far eastern end of the north slope of the Black Mountain ridge is the source of Canoas Creek.
