= Lucía Ramos =

Spanish actress

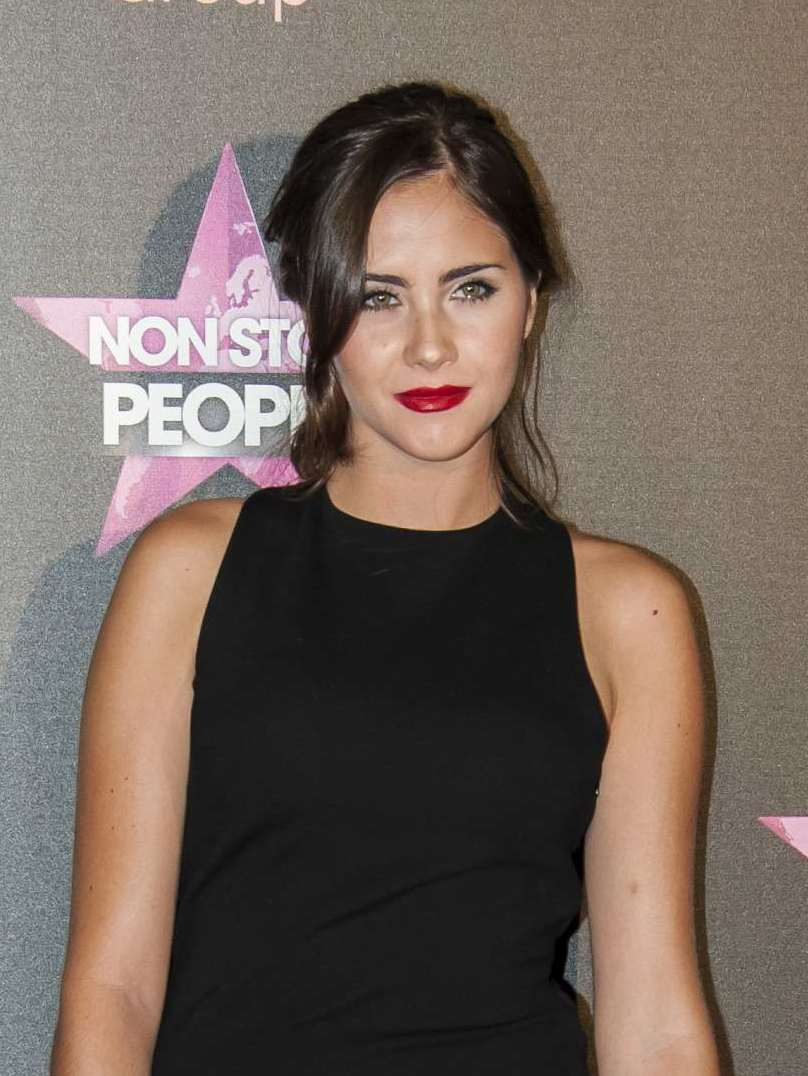
- Lucía Ramos in 2015
- Born: Lucía Ramos Nombela; 21 January 1991 (age 34); Fuenlabrada, Spain
- Occupation: Actress
- Years active: 2004-present

Lucía Ramos Nombela (Fuenlabrada, January 21, 1991) is a Spanish actress known mainly for her participation in the teen series Física o Química as Teresa.

== Biography ==
Her beginnings in the small screen are given in such popular series as El comisario, Cuéntame como pasó, El internado, Yo soy Bea or Hermanos y detectives, she had guest appearances. When she was only 18 years old, she was part of the cast of the TV-movie Inocentes (2010) directed by Daniel Calparsoro and broadcast by Telecinco. It's a thriller about prostitution based on real events.

However, the role that made her most known was that of Teresa in the last three seasons of the series Física o Química (2010-2011), a series of great popularity and audience, broadcast on Antena 3.

In 2012, she joined the cast of the new series directed by José Luis Moreno, Todo es posible en el bajo, broadcast on Telemadrid. She has also participated episodically in series such as El don de Alba and La que se avecina, both on Telecinco.

The actress has also participated in important national and international advertising campaigns, including brands such as Adidas with Zinedine Zidane, and Mustang, a brand for which she was the image for two campaigns with actor Mario Casas.

In 2014 she starred in the film En apatía, secuelas del odio, alongside Christian Casas and Álvaro Díaz. She has also participated in the films No quiero ser recuerdo, by Óscar Parra de Carrizosa, and Novatos, by Pablo Aragüés.

In 2016 she shot the miniseries Marcados, alongside Natalia Sánchez and Jaime Olías, which is still pending release. Also that year she joined the cast of the docufiction Centro Médico, broadcast by Televisión Española, where she plays the physiotherapist Marta Palacio.

== Filmography ==
=== Cinema ===
Year	Title	Character	Directed by
2014	No quiero ser recuerdo	Vega	Óscar Parra de Carrizosa
2014	En apatía: secuelas del odio	Laura	Joel Arellanes Duran
2015	Novatos	Carla	Pablo Aragüés

=== Television ===
Year	Title	Character	Duration
2004	Paco y Veva	Ana	1 episode
2005	El comisario	Mónica	1 episode
2005	Cuéntame cómo pasó	Valeria	1 episode
2007	El internado	Irene	1 episode
2007	Hermanos y detectives	Valentina	3 episodes
2008	Yo soy Bea	Daisy	6 episodes
2010	Inocentes	Carla	2 episodes
2010 - 2011	Física o química	Teresa Parra Lebrón	30 episodes
2012	Todo es posible en el bajo	Luz	11 episodes
2014	SubUrbania	Sara	1 episode
2015	La que se avecina	Sandra	1 episode
2016 - 2019	Centro médico	Marta Palacio	100 episodes
2022	Señor, dame paciencia	Lluvia	5 episodes

=== Theater ===
Year	Title	Character	Role
2015	PornoStar	Akira	Starring
2018	Aguacates	Silvia	Starring

== Videoclips ==
- «Tu alma se clavó en mi corazón» by Salva Ortega (2012).
- «Vuela» by SN2 (2013).
- «Disaster» by Mario Jefferson (2013).
- «No pide tanto idiota» by Maldita Nerea (2015).
- «Repetíamos» by Abraham Mateo (2021).
