= Alamo Mocho (Kern County) =

- Location within California
- Interactive map of Alamo Mocho
- Name origin: Spanish
- Location: Kern County, California, United States
- Coordinates: 35°50′05″N 119°55′48″W
- Elevation: 548 m (1,798 ft)
- Type: watering place

Alamo Mocho, (Trimmed Cottonwood) was a watering place on the eastern route of the El Camino Viejo, seven miles northeast of Alamo Solo Spring within the Avenal Gap on the south end of the Kettleman Hills of Kern County, California.

== History ==
The name of this watering place on the eastern route of El Camino Viejo comes from the lone Cottonwood tree at that arid site that had its lower branches cut off to feed draft animals or provide wood for fires, sometime before the Americans came to California. Alamo Mocho was the first watering place beyond Alamo Solo Spring on the eastern route that then passed to the east and followed the shore of Tulare Lake, proceeding northward across the Kings River to settlements on the Fresno Slough and San Joaquin River before it turned back to rejoin the main route at Arroyo de Panoche Grande.

When Frank F. Latta visited the site the early 1930s the cottonwood that had stood at the location was gone, the waterhole that was within 100 yards of the Hanford - Paso Robles Road was dried up, and a ranch had been established close by. Its location appears on a 1914 USGS Topographic map of Lost Hills where the site of the ranch house is indicated near the old highway within the Avenal Gap.

Today the ranch is gone and the California Aqueduct passes just south of the old site of Alamo Mocho.
