= Kecks Road =

Road in California

Kecks Road is a paved road in Kern County, California.

== Details ==
Kecks Road runs northeast from Kecks Corner on California State Route 46, Paso Robles Highway, to a junction with Twisselman Road at 35°44′01″N 119°58′27″W after Kecks Road crosses the California Aqueduct. Twisselman Road in turn joins California State Route 33 to the east at 35°43′51″N 119°56′43″W Close by the south side of Kecks Road, 0.23 miles east of the California Aqueduct, is Salt Spring, originally Aguaje de la Brea (Watering place of the Tar) one of the watering places on the route of historical El Camino Viejo.
