= San Luis Creek (California) =

San Luis Creek Arroyo de San Luis Gonzaga
- Location of the mouth of San Luis Creek in California
- Etymology: Spanish

Location
- Country: United States
- State: California
- Region: Merced County, Stanislaus County

Physical characteristics
- Source: source
  - location: 1000ft. northwest of Mariposa Peak, 3448ft, on the Merced - San Benito County boundary and 7.4 mi south of Pacheco Pass., Merced County
  - coordinates: 36°57′34″N 121°12′32″W
  - elevation: 2,800 ft (850 m)
- Mouth: mouth
  - location: at the confluence with Los Banos Creek, 3.6 miles east of Ingomar, California., Merced County
  - coordinates: 37°11′00″N 120°54′13″W
  - elevation: 79 ft (24 m)

Basin features
- Tributaries
  - left: Cottonwood Creek

San Luis Creek, originally Arroyo de San Luis Gonzaga, is a stream in Merced County, California. Its source is located near the eastern crest of the Diablo Range, west of San Luis Reservoir. It is dammed to form San Luis Reservoir in San Luis Reservoir State Park, and below that, O'Neill Forebay. From the latter the creek continues east to its confluence with Los Banos Creek, 3.6 mi (5.8 km) east of Ingomar, California. Los Banos Creek is a tributary to the San Joaquin River.

== History ==
Arroyo de San Luis Gonzaga was a watering place on El Camino Viejo in the San Joaquin Valley between Arroyo de Romero and Arroyo de Los Baños. The creek was named for Saint Aloysius Gonzaga, an Italian saint of the sixteenth century.

The adobe of the rancho Rancho San Luis Gonzaga was located along the creek in a site now behind the dam, under the waters, of the San Luis Reservoir.

== Watershed ==
San Luis Creek begins at 2,850 ft (870 m) about 1,000 ft (300 m) northwest of the 3,448 ft (1,051 m) Mariposa Peak, located 7.4 mi (11.9 km) south of Pacheco Pass and just inside Merced County at its 3-way county border with San Benito County and Santa Clara Counties. San Luis Creek initially flows north where it receives flows from Spicer Creek then turns eastwards towards San Luis Reservoir. Before reaching the reservoir it receives flows from Pacheco State Park's Salt Creek (and Salt Creek's Hidden Creek subtributary) from the left. Just before reaching the reservoir, San Luis Creek receives Portuguese Creek from the right. In San Luis Reservoir it receives Cottonwood Creek in the Cottonwood Creek Wildlife Area from the left (north). Cottonwood Creek's historic mouth is now submerged in the reservoir to form Cottonwood Bay.

== See also ==
- List of rivers of California
- O'Neill Forebay
