= Mastung =

Mastung (Urdu: مستونگ) may refer:

- Mastung District, a district in Balochistan, Pakistan
  - Mastung Tehsil, a subdivision of Mastung District, Balochistan, Pakistan
    - Mastung, Pakistan, a town in Balochistan, the capital of Mastung district
      - Mastung Road railway station
- Mastung Valley, Mastung District, Balochistan, Pakistan; a valley
- PB-37 Mastung, a provincial electoral constituency in Balochistan, Pakistan
- Cadet College Mastung, Mastung District, Balochistan, Pakistan

== See also ==
- Mustang (disambiguation)
