= Las Tinajas de Los Indios =

American landform in Kern County, California

- Indian Tanks
- Location within California

Highest point
- Elevation: 780 m (2,560 ft)

Naming
- Etymology: Spanish

Geography
- Country: United States
- State: California
- District: Kern County
- Range coordinates: 35°41′04″N 120°00′08″W
- Topo map: USGS Emigrant Hill

Geology
- Mountain type: Tinajas

Las Tinajas de Los Indios, or "Indian Tanks", are tinajas located in the sandstone heights of the Point of Rocks on the north side of Antelope Valley in Kern County, California.

== History ==
Las Tinajas de Los Indios (The Jars of the Indians), later called "Indian Tanks", was as its name suggests, the site of an Indian encampment. The tops of the Point of Rocks, sandstone rock formations, have tinajas, (jars in Spanish), natural basins that acted as reservoirs or cisterns to hold the water that collected during the winter rains and held it throughout the summer.

These tinajas bear evidence of having been improved by the Indians. Deeply worn steps have been cut into the rock leading down to the water. Indian mortars, rock writings, and other evidence have been found about the rocks that show this was a prehistoric encampment. Later it was a watering place on El Camino Viejo, between Aquaja de la Brea to the north and seven miles from Corral de Matarano at Arroyo de Matarano to the south.
