= Point of Rocks (Kern County, California) =

- Location within California

Highest point
- Elevation: 940 m (3,080 ft)
- Coordinates: 35°41′45″N 120°00′37″W

Geography
- Country: United States
- State: California
- District: Kern County
- Range coordinates: 35°41′24″N 120°00′15″W
- Topo map(s): USGS Sawtooth Ridge, Emigrant Hill

Point of Rocks is a mountain range in Kern County, California.

Its sandstone peaks were a landmark for travelers crossing the Antelope Valley on El Camino Viejo and a guide to the water to be found on their heights, at Las Tinajas de Los Indios.

Nearby to the southeast is the location of the Point of Rocks oilfield. The deepest oil well drilled in California was here in 1987. Its total depth: 24426 feet.
