= Panoche Hills =

Low mountain range in Fresno County, California, USA

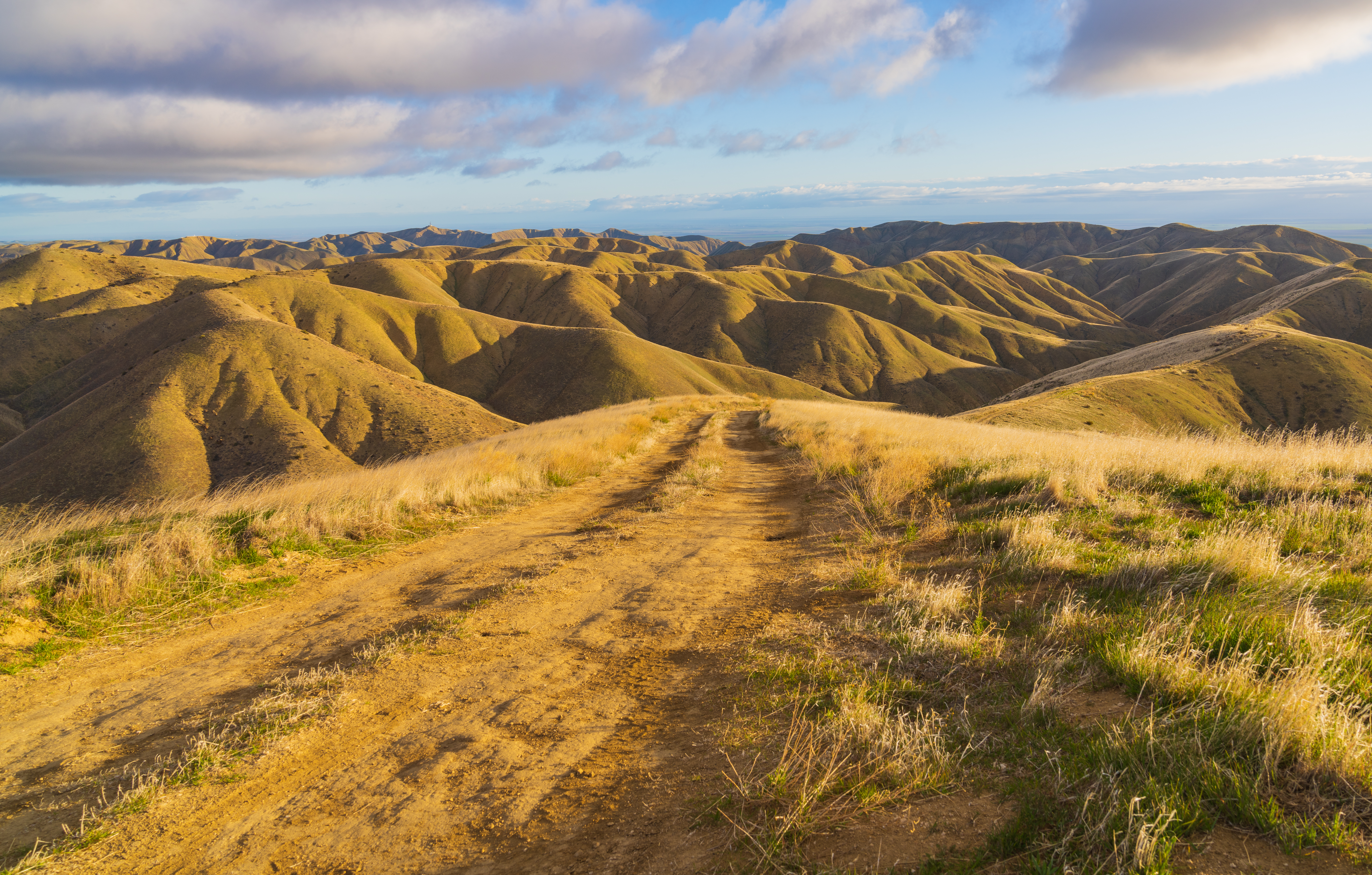

Highest point
- Elevation: 675 m (2,215 ft)

Geography
- Location within California Location within the United States
- Country: United States
- State: California
- District: Fresno County
- Range coordinates: 36°38′40.828″N 120°43′54.641″W
- Parent range: Diablo Range
- Topo map: USGS Chounet Ranch

The Panoche Hills are a low mountain range in the Southern Inner California Coast Ranges System, in western Fresno County, California.

They are east of the Diablo Range, on the west side of the San Joaquin Valley. They define the eastern side of the Panoche Valley.

== Parks ==
=== Panoche Hills Recreation Area ===
The US Bureau of Land Management (BLM) maintains the Panoche Hills Recreation Area, a recreation area within the hills. The entrance to the BLM area is across Little Panoche Road from the Mercey Hot Springs resort. This BLM land is under Fire Season Vehicle Restrictions from mid-April to mid-October. No motorized access is allowed during this time period.

=== Panoche Hills Ecological Reserve ===
The California Department of Fish and Game also maintains the Panoche Hills Ecological Reserve, an ecological reserve within the hills.

== Natural history ==
The Hills contain examples of fossilized remains of Mesozoic era cold seeps.

== See also ==
- Panoche Pass
- Panoche Valley

Panoche Hills Map with road labels
