= Rancho Panoche de San Juan y Los Carrisolitos =

Mexican land grant in California

Coordinates: 36.910°N 120.980°W

Rancho Panoche de San Juan y Los Carrisalitos was a 22,175-acre (89.74 km^{2}) Mexican land grant in present-day Merced County, California given in 1844 by Governor Manuel Micheltorena to Julian Ursua and Pedro Romo. The name means "raw sugar of San Juan and the little patches of reeds" in Spanish.

The grant was in the eastern Diablo Range, south of Rancho San Luis Gonzaga and present-day San Luis Reservoir, and extended along Los Carrisalitos Creek, bounded on the north by Los Banos Creek and on the south by Ortigalita Creek.

== History ==
Julian Ursua and Pedro Romo were granted the five square league Rancho Panoche de San Juan y Los Carrisalitos in 1844.

With the cession of California to the United States following the Mexican–American War, the 1848 Treaty of Guadalupe Hidalgo provided that the land grants would be honored. As required by the Land Act of 1851, a claim for Rancho Panoche de San Juan y Los Carrisalitos was filed with the Public Land Commission in 1853, and the grant was patented to Julian Ursua and Pedro Romo in 1867.

Juan Miguel Arburua later acquired the ranch. The ranch has remained in the Arburua family.
