= Zapato Chino Creek =

River in California, USA

Zapato Chino Creek Polvadero Creek, Zapato Creek
- Etymology: Spanish
- Native name: Arroyo de Las Polvarduras (Spanish); Arroyo de Zapata Chino (Spanish)

Location
- Country: United States
- State: California
- Region: Fresno County

Physical characteristics
- Source: source
  - location: in Zapato Chino Canyon on the east slope of Mustang Peak in the Diablo Range., Fresno County
  - coordinates: 35°58′35″N 120°04′18″W
  - elevation: 3,250 ft (990 m)
- Mouth: mouth
  - location: dissipates in the San Joaquin Valley, 11 miles east of Coalinga, reaching Los Gatos Creek in flood years., Fresno County
  - coordinates: 36°09′49″N 120°11′23″W
  - elevation: 472 ft (144 m)

Zapato Chino Creek formerly known both as Arroyo de Las Polvarduras (Creek of the Dust Clouds) and Arroyo de Zapata Chino (Chinese Shoe Creek), is a creek in Fresno County, California. Its source is in Zapato Chino Canyon on the east slope of Mustang Peak in the Diablo Range. From there it runs northwest through Zapato Chino Canyon, in the Krayenhagen Hills, then passed across Pleasant Valley to the Guijarral Hills, then east through the Polvadero Gap, then runs northeast to its confluence with Los Gatos Creek. It usually dissipates in the San Joaquin Valley, 11 miles east of Coalinga. However it reaches Los Gatos Creek in years of heavy rainfall.

== History ==
Zapato Chino Creek, originally was known by two names, Arroyo de Las Polvarduras (Creek of the Dust Clouds), and Arroyo de Zapata Chino (Chinese Shoe Creek), it was the location of watering places on El Camino Viejo, between Jacalitos Creek to the north and Canoas Creek to the south.

What is now called Zapato Chino Creek below its emergence from the Canyon was called Pulvero Creek in a 1907 Fresno County, Township map, of Range 16 East. Pulvero seems to be a corruption of the Spanish, polvero, which means "dust cloud".

According to the 1913, Gazetteer of Surface waters, California, in San Joaquin River Basin:

"Polvadero Creek (L); Fresno County; rises in the northern part of T. 24 S., R. 15 E.; flows northeastward 18 miles into San Joaquin Valley; sinks before reaching Los Gatos Creek, to which its basin is topographically tributary; called Zapatos Creek in the upper part of its course. Fisk and Johnson map."

The Fisk and Johnson Map referred to above, is the Manuscript map of San Joaquin Valley compiled by A. J. Fisk Jr., and H. R. Johnson, in 1866. Polvadero again may be a corruption of the Spanish, polvareda meaning "cloud of dust".

It may be that at the time that the Spanish or Californio persons originally named Zapato Chino Creek, Canoas Creek joined Zapato Chino Creek near its place of emergence from its Canyon. They would have considered Zapato Chino Creek to end at this confluence with Canoas Creek. Then from this confluence the creek would then have the name of Arroyo de Las Polvarduras, passing through the Polvadero Gap and on until its confluence with Los Gatos Creek (Arroyo Pasajero or Arroyo Poso de Chane). Subsequently, Canoas Creek or Zapato Chino Creek must have changed their courses over time away from this confluence, into the separate channels they have today according to current maps and probably at the time in 1908 when official names were assigned. The channels where they are now are not far apart in the area of the possible former confluence.

The location between the Guijarral Hills and the Kettleman Hills where Arroyo de Las Polvarduras ran is still officially called the Polvadero Gap with Polvadera Gap as a recognized variant. Strangely the GNIS Board Decision in 1908 was to name the whole length of the creek, Zapato Creek, apparently ignorant of local usage of Polvarderas, Polvadero or Pulvero or maybe ignoring it altogether as they do not appear on the decision card. In 1964 the name was changed Zapato Creek to Zapato Chino Creek all the way to its confluence with Los Gatos Creek.
