= Elk Hills =

Mountain range in the Transverse Ranges, Kern County, California

- Location within California Location within the United States

Highest point
- Elevation: 374 m (1,227 ft)

Geography
- Country: United States
- State: California
- District: Kern County
- Range coordinates: 35°16′53.869″N 119°26′38.422″W
- Topo map: USGS East Elk Hills

The Elk Hills are a low mountain range in the Transverse Ranges, in western Kern County, California.

They are near and east of the Elkhorn Hills in San Luis Obispo County, California
