= Chico Martinez Creek =

- Etymology: Spanish
- Native name: Arroyo Chico Martinez (Spanish)

Location
- Country: United States
- State: California
- Region: Kern County

Physical characteristics
- Source: source
  - location: on the east slope of the Temblor Range., Kern County
  - coordinates: 35°23′21.44″N 119°52′47.17″W
- Mouth: mouth
  - location: 73.6 km (46 mi) west of Bakersfield, just east of the South Belridge Oil Field., Kern County
  - coordinates: 35°27′40″N 119°41′56″W
  - elevation: 525 ft (160 m)

Chico Martinez Creek, formerly Arroyo Chico Martinez is a stream with its source located in the Temblor Range in Kern County, California near to the San Luis Obispo County boundary. Its source is located 10.7 miles north of Soda Lake, California in the middle of the Carrizo Plain. The creek runs generally east and northeast to terminate just east of the South Belridge Oil Field. In years of heavy rainfall it may have been a tributary to the Kern River between Buena Vista Lake and Tulare Lake.

== History ==
Arroyo Chico Martinez was a watering place on El Camino Viejo between Temblor Creek and Carneros Creek. The place where the creek emerged from the foothills of the Temblor Range is marked by white chalklike bluffs and hills that may be seen miles across the plains. This stream was named for a 19th-century pioneer in the southern San Joaquin Valley region, Chico Martinez, a mesteñero, famous as the "king of the "mustang runners", for his skill in herding wild horses into the corrals built for their capture, at Aguaje Mesteño (Mustang Watering Place) and other places.
