= Los Gatos Creek (Fresno County, California) =

- Etymology: Spanish
- Native name: Arroyo Pasajero, Arroyo Poso de Chane (Spanish)

Location
- Country: United States
- State: California
- Region: Fresno County

Physical characteristics
- Source: source
  - location: in the north end of Garcia Canyon in the Diablo Range., Fresno County
  - coordinates: 36°18′50″N 120°39′00″W
- Mouth: mouth
  - location: dissipates in the San Joaquin Valley, 1.9 miles northwest of Huron., Fresno County
  - coordinates: 36°13′20″N 120°07′29″W
  - elevation: 381 ft (116 m)

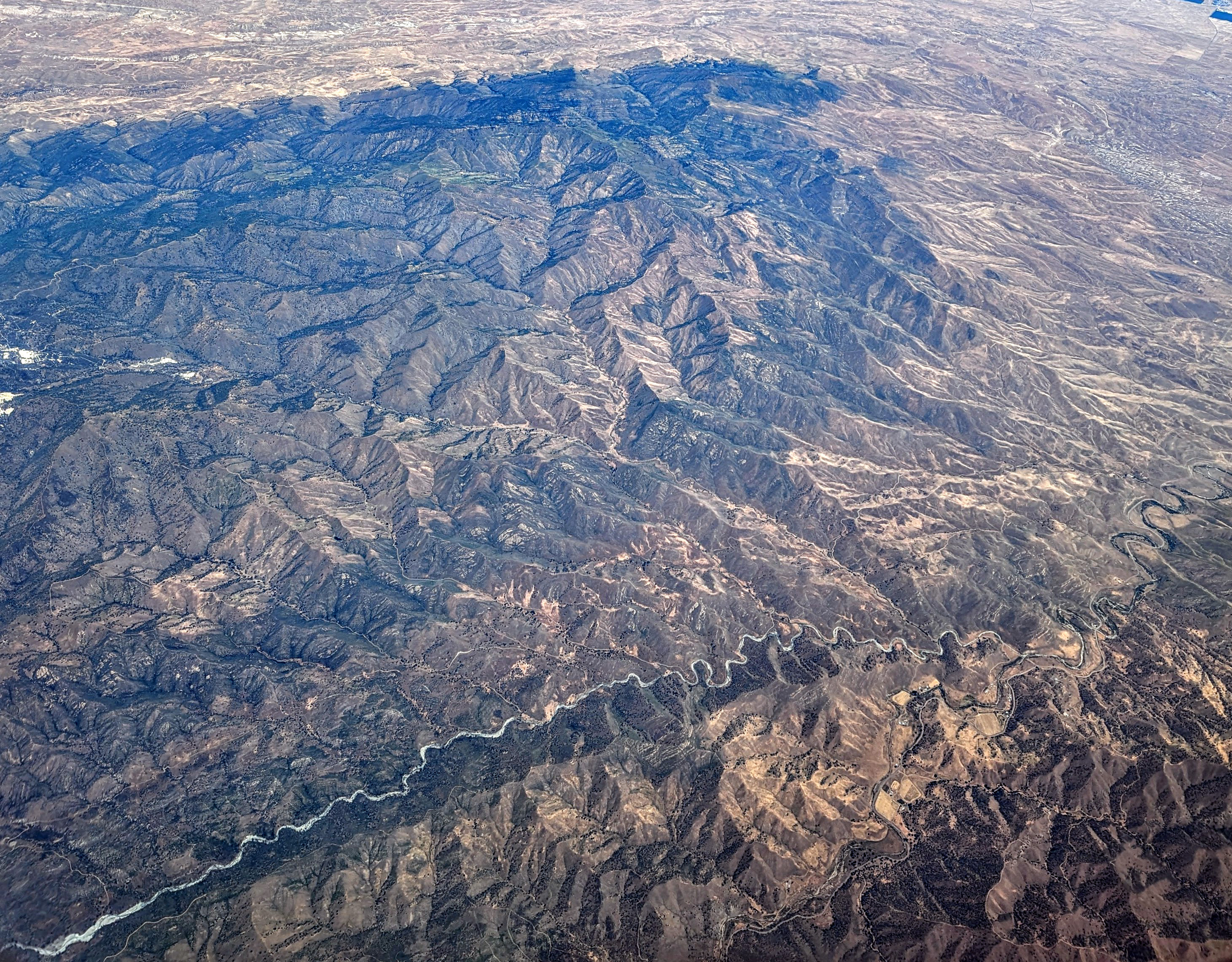
Aerial view of Los Gatos Creek (Fresno County) above Coalinga, California

Los Gatos Creek, formerly known as Arroyo Pasajero or Arroyo Poso de Chane, is a creek in Fresno County, California. Its source is in the north end of Garcia Canyon in the Diablo Range near Benito Pass. From there it runs through Los Gatos Canyon, in the eastern foothills of the Diablo Range, then passes across Pleasant Valley, north of Coalinga, where Warthan Creek joins it east of the town. Then it flows eastward to its confluence with Jacalitos Creek, before it passes to the north of the Guijarral Hills, into the San Joaquin Valley, where it is joined by Zapato Chino Creek.

Some 19th-century maps show Los Gatos Creek and others on the west side of the San Joaquin Valley reaching the North Fork Kings River distributary after it turned south toward Tulare Lake. This probably reflected what happened in extremely wet years like 1852, 1861–62 and 1873–74, before the advent of agricultural diversion. Most maps showed them only extending a short way from the foothills, their normal extent in years of normal rainfall. Today Los Gatos Creek does not flow east of 1.9 miles northwest of Huron except in times of flood but no farther than the California Aqueduct.

== History ==
Los Gatos Creek, originally Arroyo Pasajero (traveler creek) or Arroyo Poso de Chane (pool of the Chane stream), included the Poso de Chane, a pool or waterhole on the creek, northwest of the Guijarral Hills, 6 miles from Coalinga. This pool was once the site of a village of Native Americans called the Chane by the Spanish. This location became a small Spanish and later a Mexican settlement, and a way station on the El Camino Viejo. The Poso de Chane and the settlement was destroyed in the Great Flood of 1862. However, as late as 1925 the course of Los Gatos Creek east of the Guijarral Hills was referred to as Arroyo Pasajero on a USGS Topographic map of Coalinga.

Los Gatos Creek is remembered as the site of a plane crash in 1948 which was the subject of a song by Woody Guthrie, "Deportee (Plane Wreck at Los Gatos)".

== Los Gatos Creek County Park ==
Los Gatos Creek flows through Los Gatos Creek County Park.
