= Panoche Valley =

Valley in California, United States

- Location within California
- Floor elevation: 1,253 ft (382 m)

Geography
- Location: San Benito County, California
- Coordinates: 36°37′00″N 120°51′04″W
- Topo map: Panoche, Mercey Hot Springs, Llanada
- Rivers: Panoche Creek, Las Aguilas Creek, Griswold Creek
- Interactive map of Panoche Valley

Panoche Valley is a grassland valley lying between the Diablo Range and the San Joaquin Valley, in San Benito County, California. The valley is bound on the north by Panoche Hills, on the east by Tumey Hills, on the south by the Griswold Hills and Cerro Bonito, and on the in west by Las Aguilas Mountains. The valley is known by naturalists as a hot spot for rare birds and mammals, and for providing a glimpse of old California.

== History ==
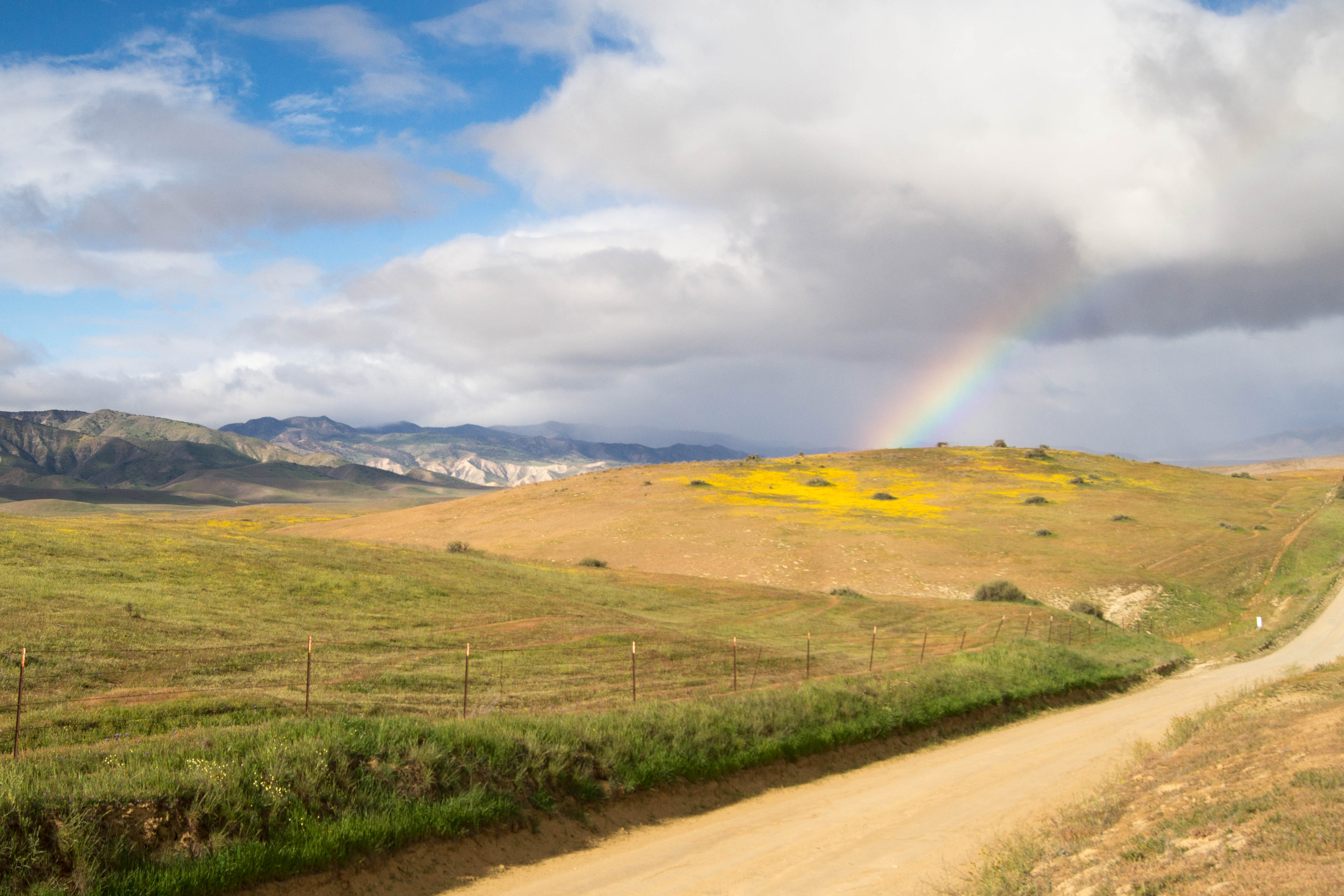
Panoche Road rainbow 2015

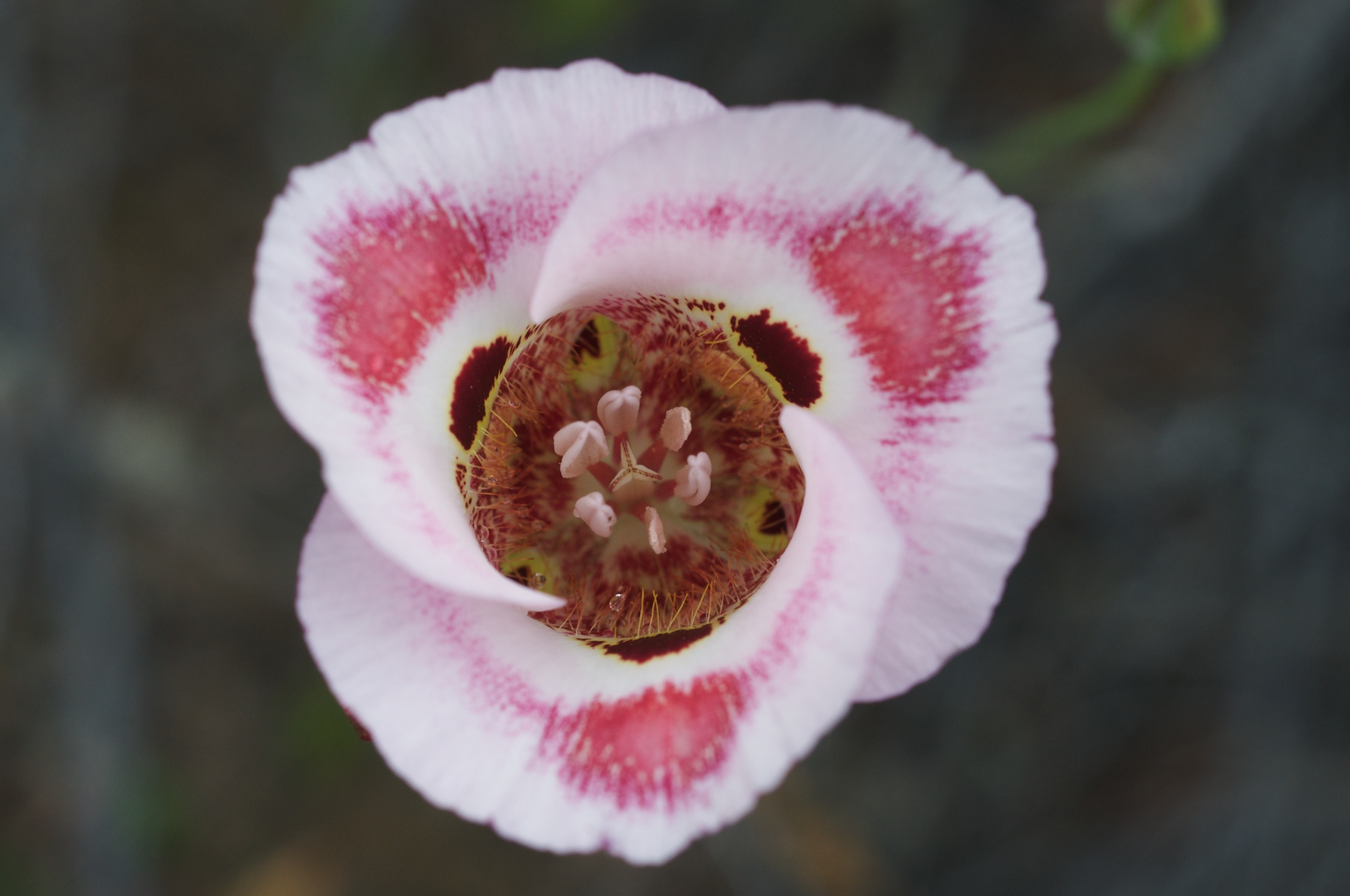
Mariposa Lily, Calochortus venustus, Panoche Road, 2010

Panoche Valley was originally called Valle de Panoche Grande, later anglicized as Big Panoche Valley, after the former names of Panoche Creek that runs through it. Panoche is Mexican Spanish for a coarse grade of sugar made in Mexico, also for a diminutive of pan, (bread).

Panoche Valley is also the site of the Panoche Valley Solar Farm.

== Geography ==
The upper end of the valley has its location northwest of Walker Peak where the creek enters the Diablo Range at 36°36′59″N 120°56′29″W.

The town of Panoche, lies in this valley. After wet winters, the valley sometimes hosts spectacular spring wildflower displays.
