= Media Aqua Creek =

- Location of the mouth of Media Aqua Creek in California
- Etymology: Spanish
- Native name: Aguaje de en Media (Spanish)

Location
- Country: United States
- State: California
- Region: San Luis Obispo County, Kern County

Physical characteristics
- Source: source
  - location: Temblor Range, San Luis Obispo County
  - coordinates: 35°25′39″N 119°56′15″W
- Mouth: mouth
  - location: San Joaquin Valley, Kern County
  - coordinates: 35°31′42″N 119°52′37″W
  - elevation: 896 ft (273 m)

Media Aqua Creek, originally Aguaje de en Media (Middle Watering Place), is a creek in northwestern Kern County and eastern San Luis Obispo County, central California.

The stream's headwaters are in the Temblor Range, at an unnamed spring in San Luis Obispo County, 0.8 miles south of the Kern County−San Luis Obispo County border. It flows east-northeast to terminate in the San Joaquin Valley, 3 miles southeast of the former Twisselmann Ranch in Kern County.

== El Camino Viejo history ==
Aguaje de en Media (Middle Watering Place) was a watering stop on the 19th century El Camino Viejo of Alta California, between the stops of Arroyo de Los Carneros to the south and Aguaje Del Diablo to the west. It was officially named Media Agua Creek in 1909.
