= Aguaje Mesteño =

Coordinates: 35.41756°N 119.83683°W

Aguaje Mesteño or Mustang Springs, is a watering place along El Camino Viejo, on Chico Martinez Creek, formerly Arroyo Chico Martinez. The springs are located in Kern County, California, United States.

== History ==
Aguaje Mesteño acquired its name from Chico Martinez, a mesteñero, famous as the "king of the "mustang runners", for his skill in herding those wild horses into the corrals he built for their capture, at Aguaje Mesteño. This watering place lies at the foot of a high sandstone outcropping. Its waters ran downstream until it met with waters coming from Aquaje de los Encinos (Live Oak Springs). This combined flow would reach the edge of the plains, but it became dry there following the diversion of Live Oak Springs to supply water to the North Belridge and South Belridge oil fields.
