= Rancho de los Californios, California =

Rancho de los Californios
- Locale
- Location in California
- Coordinates: 36°47′34.98″N 120°07′57.68″W
- Country: United States
- State: California
- County: Fresno
- Elevation: 210 ft (64 m)

Rancho de los Californios is a former settlement in Fresno County, California, United States. It was named after the Californios (Hispanic people from California).

== Geography ==
The settlement was located east of Pueblo de las Juntas on high ground near the south bank of the San Joaquin River. Its site is near the corner of Ashlan and North Lake Avenues, four miles north of the Whitesbridge Road and six miles west of Biola.

== History ==
Located on the Eastern route of El Camino Viejo, the place was used as a hideout for horse thieves during Spanish and Mexican rule, and continued to be a place of relative safety for outlaws during the early years of American rule.
