= Reward, Kern County, California =

Unincorporated community in California, United States

Reward
- Unincorporated community
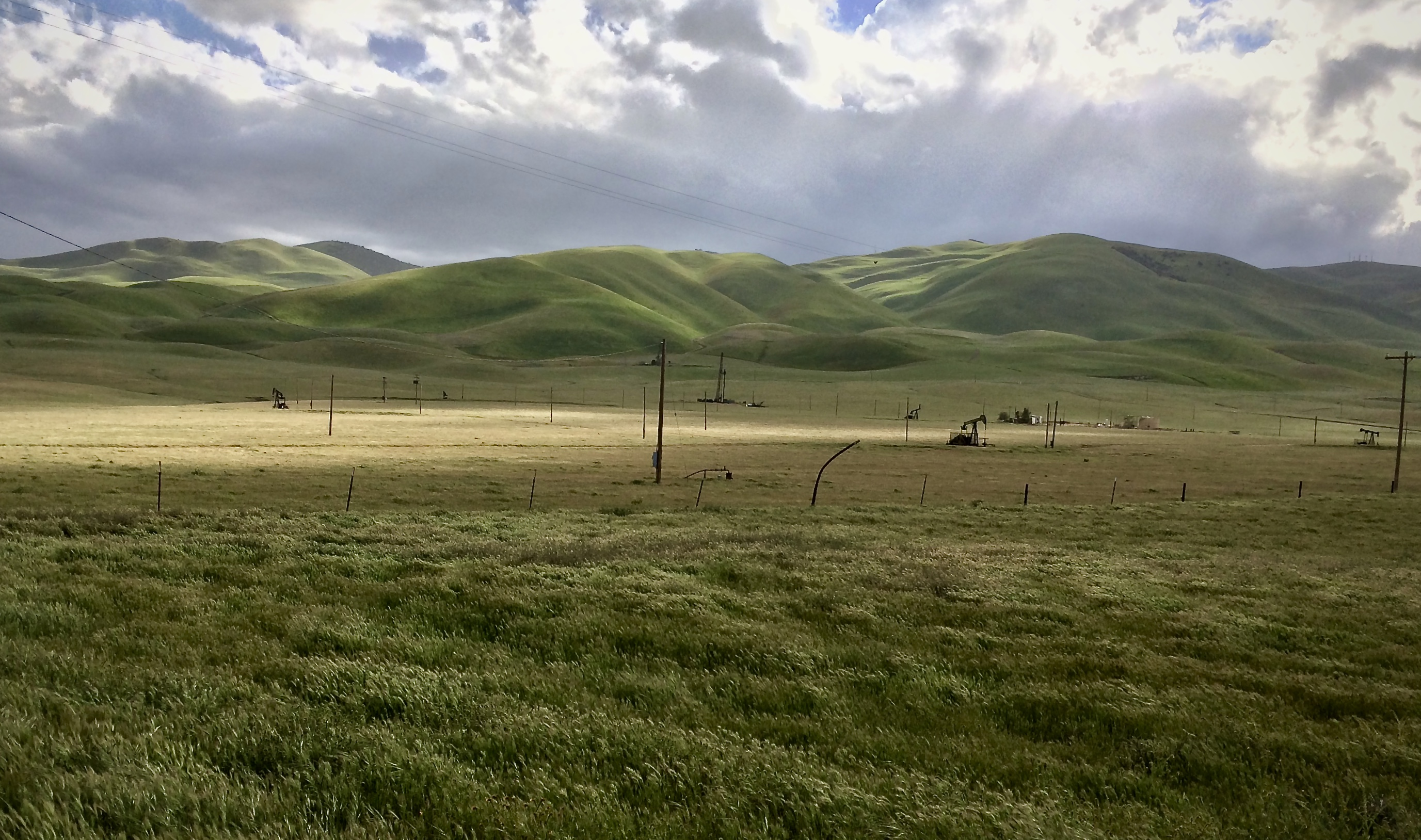
- Small oil field near Reward, Calif.

- Location in California Reward (the United States)
- Coordinates: 35°19′21″N 119°40′45″W
- Country: United States
- State: California
- County: Kern
- Elevation: 1,276 ft (389 m)

Reward is an unincorporated community in western Kern County, California, United States.

== Geography ==
It is located 3.5 miles (5.6 km) west-northwest of McKittrick, at an elevation of 1,276 feet (389 m) in the southern Temblor Range. Reward is located in the McKittrick Oil Field.

== History ==
Reward was the location of the Aguaje de Santa Maria (Waterhole of Saint Mary) water stop on the 19th century El Camino Viejo in Alta California.

The first wooden oil derrick in Kern County was constructed at the future site of Reward in 1878, to drill for flux oil to mix with asphalt that was being mined in Asphalto and refined in McKittrick. The settlement of Reward was founded in 1907, its name derived from the discovery of oil at the site. A post office operating there from 1909 to 1937.

As of 2019, a small oil field is being developed near Reward: see photo dated 4-09-2019. Note active drill rig at right center.
