= Mustang Peak =

Mustang Peak may refer to the following summits:

- Mustang Peak (Coast Mountains, Alaska), in the Coast Mountains
- Mustang Peak (Mustang Mountains, Arizona), in the Mustang Mountains
- Mustang Peak (Monterey County, California), in the Diablo Range
- Mustang Peak (Stanislaus County, California), in the Diablo Range
