= Little Salado Creek =

- Etymology: Spanish
- Native name: Arroyita Salado (Spanish)

Location
- Country: United States
- State: California
- Region: Stanislaus County

Physical characteristics
- Source
  - coordinates: 37°23′40″N 121°14′22″W
  - elevation: 1,585 ft (483 m)
- Mouth: mouth
  - location: in Stanislaus County
  - coordinates: 37°26′00″N 121°06′08″W
  - elevation: 118 ft (36 m)

Basin features
- River system: San Joaquin River

Little Salado Creek, originally Arroyita Salado (Little Salt Creek) is a tributary of the San Joaquin River draining eastern slopes of part of the Diablo Range within the Central Valley of California, United States. The Creek ends before it reaches the San Joaquin River, south of Patterson in Stanislaus County.

Arroyita Salado was a watering place on El Camino Viejo in the San Joaquin Valley and provided water for Rancho Del Puerto.
