= Vaca Adobe =

Former settlement in California, U.S.

Coordinates: 36.05222°N 119.96435°W

Vaca Adobe or Vaca Dugout is a former settlement in what was then Tulare County, now Kings County, California, United States. It was located at a stopping place on the eastern route of the El Camino Viejo, approximately three miles north of the site of what is now Kettleman City, close to the shore of Tulare Lake. The adobe at the site was known as the Vaca Dugout, and was built in 1863 by vaqueros Juan Perria and Pablo Vaca. In 1863, California was in the midst of the severe 1863-64 drought that would kill most of the cattle in the southern part of the state. Tulare Lake and the tules marshes around it were one of the few places cattle could get feed and water. The adobe was the headquarters for the vaqueros who were tending the herds in the vicinity.

== See also ==
- List of ghost towns in California
