= Mustang Peak (Monterey County, California) =

Mountain in the American state of California

- Location within California Location within the United States

Highest point
- Elevation: 3,609 ft (1,100 m)
- Prominence: 332 ft (101 m)
- Coordinates: 35°58′28.34″N 120°24′48.04″W

Geography
- Location: Fresno County, Monterey County, California, United States
- Parent range: Diablo Range
- Topo map: USGS Parkfield

Mustang Peak is a summit in the Diablo Range on the northwest - southeast trending range of mountains marking the boundary of Monterey County and Fresno County, California. This summit rises to an elevation of 3,596 feet (1,096 meters). It overlooks the Kreyenhagen Hills and Kettleman Plain beyond it to the east, and the Jacalitos Hills and Pleasant Valley beyond it to the north. To the south is Joaquin Canyon, tributary to Cholame Creek and to the west is Mine Mountain and Cholame Creek beyond it, below its summit.
