= Las Aguilas Mountains =

Mountain range in California, United States

- Location within California

Highest point
- Elevation: 1,004 m (3,294 ft)

Geography
- Country: United States
- State: California
- District: San Benito County
- Range coordinates: 36°44′35.821″N 121°0′10.677″W
- Topo map: USGS Panoche Pass

The Las Aguilas Mountains are a mountain range in San Benito County, California.

== See also ==
- Panoche Pass
