= Red Hill (Merced County) =

Mountain in the American state of California

- Location within California Location within the United States

Highest point
- Elevation: 2,398 ft (731 m)
- Prominence: 842 ft (257 m)
- Coordinates: 37°7′30.90″N 121°11′39.42″W

Geography
- Location: Mendocino County, California, United States
- Parent range: Diablo Range
- Topo map: USGS Crevison Peak

Red Hill is a summit on the eastern slope of the Diablo Range, in Merced County, California. Its highest elevation is 2,326 feet (709 meters). The summit is part of a long ridge where its high point is between 37°07′35″N 121°11′31″W and 37°07′27″N 121°11′50″W. The Red Mountain Road (formerly the Cottonwood Grade), runs over this ridge between Fifield Road on the divide of the Diablo Range and McCabe Road on Romero Creek.
