= La Libertad, California =

La Libertad
- Locale
- Location in California
- Coordinates: 36°28′50.38″N 119°52′44.54″W
- Country: United States
- State: California
- County: Fresno
- Elevation: 216 ft (66 m)

La Libertad, California is a former settlement in Fresno County, California, United States that was located one-half mile south and five miles east of Burrel. It was an early Mexican settlement in San Joaquin Valley, on the eastern route of El Camino Viejo that existed there until at least 1870.
