= Ortigalita Creek =

- Etymology: Spanish

Location
- Country: United States
- State: California
- Region: Merced County

Physical characteristics
- Source: source
  - location: near a peak on the Ortigalita Ridge of the Diablo Range., Merced County
  - coordinates: 36°48′34″N 120°59′04″W
  - elevation: 3,520 ft (1,070 m)
- Mouth: mouth
  - location: terminates just as it emerges from the foothills before it reaches the California Aqueduct., Merced County
  - coordinates: 36°57′22″N 120°52′40″W
  - elevation: 276 ft (84 m)

Ortigalita Creek, formerly Arroyo de Las Ortigalito (Little Nettle Creek) is a tributary stream of the San Joaquin River, in Merced County, California. The source of Ortigalita Creek is at 3,520 ft (1,070 m) located near a peak on the Ortigalita Ridge of the Diablo Range. Its mouth is 7.2 mi (11.6 km) south southwest of Los Banos, California just as it emerges from the foothills before it reaches the California Aqueduct. Originally in years of heavy winter rainfall it may have reached the vicinity of the Mud Slough of the San Joaquin River.

== History ==
Arroyo de Las Ortigalito was a watering place on El Camino Viejo in the San Joaquin Valley between Arroyo de los Baños and Arroyita de Panoche. Arroyo de Las Ortigalito also was the southern boundary of Rancho Panoche de San Juan y Los Carrisolitos.

== See also ==
- List of rivers of California
