= Little Panoche Creek =

Little Panoche Creek Pannochita Creek
- Etymology: little sugarloaf creek
- Native name: Arroyita de Panoche (Spanish); Arroyo de Pannochita (Spanish)

Location
- Country: United States
- State: California
- Region: Fresno County

Physical characteristics
- Source: source
  - location: on the east slope of Glaucophane Ridge of the Diablo Range., San Benito County
  - coordinates: 36°41′55″N 120°53′39″W
  - elevation: 1,520 ft (460 m)
- Mouth: mouth
  - location: California Aqueduct., Fresno County
  - coordinates: 36°49′09″N 120°43′33″W
  - elevation: 338 ft (103 m)

Little Panoche Creek formerly known as Arroyita de Panoche or Arroyo de Pannochita (Little Sugarloaf Creek) and later anglicized to Panochita Creek is a creek in Fresno County, California. The source of this creek is on the east slope of Glaucophane Ridge, of the Diablo Range in San Benito County. It flows east-northeast through Little Panoche Reservoir to empty into the California Aqueduct. Before the advent of irrigation projects in the valley, its waters might have reached a slough of the San Joaquin River in years of heavy rains.

== History ==
Arroyita de Panoche was a watering place on El Camino Viejo in the San Joaquin Valley between Arroyo de Las Ortigalito (Little Nettle Creek) and Arroyo de Panoche Grande (Big Sugarloaf Creek).
