= Dagany Gap =

- Location within California
- Elevation: 1,883 ft (574 m)

Third Approach
- Location: Kern County, California
- Coordinates: 35°46′46″N 120°00′01″W

Dagany Gap, a gap in the Pyramid Hills of Kern County, California. It is bounded on the west by Sunflower Valley and on the northeast by the Kettleman Plain and southeast by the Antelope Plain. It was named for a local settler who held land in the vicinity, Ralph Arnold Dagany.
