= Quinto Creek =

- Etymology: Spanish
- Native name: El Arroyo de Quinto (Spanish)

Location
- Country: United States
- State: California
- Region: Merced County, Stanislaus County

Physical characteristics
- Source: source
  - location: head about 1/2 mile north of Pine Springs Hill and the Madera County line., Stanislaus County
  - coordinates: 37°11′18.31″N 121°16′52.82″W
  - elevation: 1,750 ft (530 m)
- Mouth: mouth
  - location: at its confluence with the Outside Canal., Merced County
  - coordinates: 37°11′5.79″N 121°01′56.73″W
  - elevation: 148 ft (45 m)
- Length: 16 mi (26 km)

Quinto Creek, originally El Arroyo de Quinto, later Kinto Creek, is a tributary stream of the San Joaquin River that now fails to reach the river. Its source drains the slopes of the Diablo Range within the Central Valley of California, United States. The Creek has its source in Stanislaus County a canyon a half mile north of Pine Springs Hill, a 2386-foot mountain, about 16 miles from its mouth just east of where it emerges from the foothills in Merced County, shortly ending where it joins the Outside Canal. The closest populated place is Ingomar that is 3.6 miles east of the mouth of Quinto Creek.

== History ==
El Arroyo de Quinto was a watering place on El Camino Viejo in the San Joaquin Valley between Arroyo de Mesteño and Arroyo de Romero.
