= Los Baños Creek =

Stream in Merced County, California

- Location of mouth
- Etymology: Spanish
- Native name: El Arroyo de Los Baños (Spanish)

Location
- Country: United States
- State: California
- Region: Merced County

Physical characteristics
- Source
  - location: Confluence of North Fork Los Banos Creek and South Fork Los Banos Creek
  - coordinates: 36°57′32″N 121°06′35″W
  - elevation: 633 ft (193 m)
- Mouth
  - location: Mud Slough, 2.5 miles upstream from the mouth of the Merced River
  - coordinates: 37°17′58″N 120°56′56″W
  - elevation: 69 ft (21 m)

California Historical Landmark
- Official name: Los Baños
- Reference no.: 550

Los Baños Creek or Los Banos Creek, originally El Arroyo de los Baños, is a 40 miles (64 km) long tributary stream of the San Joaquin River in Merced County, California. From its source in the central Diablo Range it flows east into the Central Valley where it turns northeast to the west edge of Los Banos. From there Los Baños Creek heads north to Mud Slough, 2.5 miles (4 km) upstream from its confluence with the San Joaquin River.

== History ==
Los Baños Creek is reported to have taken its name from the pools, near its head, called Los Baños de Padre Arroyo for Padre Felipe Arroyo de la Cuesta, who was at Mission San Juan Bautista from 1808 to 1833 and conducted proselytizing missions into the San Joaquin Valley.

El Arroyo de los Baños was a watering place on El Camino Viejo in the San Joaquin Valley between Arroyo de Quinto and Arroyo de San Luis Gonzaga.

Los Baños de Padre Arroyo is registered as California Historical Landmark #550.

== Watershed ==
The Los Baños Creek mainstem has its source at the confluence of North Fork Los Banos Creek and South Fork Los Banos Creek. The South Fork Los Banos Creek crosses northeast from San Benito County into Merced County to the confluence and is 19.2 miles (30.9 km) long. The North Fork Los Banos Creek originates east of Antimony Peak and the border of San Benito and Merced Counties. It is 8.2 miles (13.2 km) long.

The Los Banos Creek Detention Dam, also known as the Los Banos Detention Dam, was constructed between 1965 and 1966 to provide flood protection for the San Luis Canal, Delta-Mendota Canal, the city of Los Banos, and other downstream developments. The dam formed the Los Banos Reservoir.

== See also ==
El Camino Viejo
