= Aguaje Draw =

Landform between Arizona and New Mexico

Location
- Country: United States
- States: Arizona, New Mexico
- Counties: Apache County (AZ), Valencia County (NM)

Physical characteristics
- Source
  - location: Valencia County, New Mexico
  - elevation: 6,759 ft (2,060 m)
- Mouth
  - location: Confluence with Carrizo Wash, Apache County, Arizona
  - elevation: 5,741 ft (1,750 m)

Basin features
- River system: Little Colorado River

Aguaje Draw is a valley and a tributary stream of the Little Colorado River in Apache County, Arizona and Valencia County, New Mexico. The mouth of Aguaje Draw is located at its confluence with Carrizo Wash, a tributary of the Little Colorado River, at an elevation of 5,741 feet (1,750 meters) in Apache County, Arizona. Its source is located at 34°43′08″N 108°58′26″W at an elevation of 6,759 feet (2,060 meters), in Valencia County, New Mexico.
