= Panoche Pass =

Mountain pass in Diablo Range, California

- Location within California
- Elevation: 2,250 feet (690 m)
- Traversed by: CR J1

Third Approach
- Location: San Benito County, California, United States
- Range: Diablo Range
- Coordinates: 36°37′41″N 121°00′51″W
- Topo map: USGS Panoche Pass

Panoche Pass is a mountain pass within the Diablo Range in San Benito County, California connecting the southern extremity of the Santa Clara Valley in the west to the Panoche Valley and San Joaquin Valley in the east. The name Panoche Pass is used for the United States Geological Survey quadrangle map for the local area. County Route J1, also known as the Panoche Road, traverses the pass.

The elevation of 2,250 feet (690 m) posted on the official highway sign is at least 130 feet (40 m) higher than that indicated on the official USGS topographic map of the area.

== Natural history ==
The headwaters of Panoche Creek are located at Panoche Pass.

The locale has numerous flora and fauna species. There are also a number of wildflower species including the iconic yellow mariposa lily, Calochortus luteus, which has been specifically noted in the Panoche Pass.

== See also ==
- Panoche Hills
- Pacheco Pass lies to the north of Panoche Pass and is more heavily travelled
- New Idria, California
