= Las Juntas, Belén =

Coordinates: 27°17′S 66°54′W

Las Juntas (Belén)
- Municipality and village
- Interactive map of Las Juntas (Belén)
- Country: Argentina
- Province: Catamarca Province
- Time zone: UTC−3 (ART)

Las Juntas (Belén) is a village and municipality in Catamarca Province in northwestern Argentina.
