= Jacalitos Creek =

- Location of the mouth within California
- Native name: Arroyo de Jacelitos (Spanish)

Location
- Country: United States
- State: California
- Region: Fresno County

Physical characteristics
- Source: source
  - location: 0.6 miles north of Andrews Peak, in the Diablo Range., Fresno County
  - coordinates: 36°02′52″N 120°32′58″W
- Mouth: mouth
  - location: flows east-northeast to Los Gatos Creek, 2.6 miles south of Coalinga Nose., Fresno County
  - coordinates: 36°08′51″N 120°15′50″W
  - elevation: 548 ft (167 m)

Jacalitos Creek formerly known as Arroyo de Jacelitos (Creek of Little Huts), is a creek in Fresno County, California.

Its source is 0.96 km (0.6 mi) north of Andrews Peak, in the Diablo Range. From there it runs east then northeast between the Jacalitos Hills and the Kreyenhagen Hills, then passes across Pleasant Valley to its confluence with Los Gatos Creek 4.2 km (2.6 mi) south of Coalinga Nose.

== History ==
Jacalitos Creek, originally known as El Arroyo de Jacelitos, it was the location of watering places on El Camino Viejo, between Los Gatos Creek to the north and Zapato Chino Creek to the south. Jacalitos is derived from a Spanish word, jacal, meaning a hut with a thatched roof and walls consisting of thin stakes driven into the ground close together and plastered with mud. Modified with the ending -ito, gives it the meaning "little huts".
