= Griswold Hills =

Mountain range in California

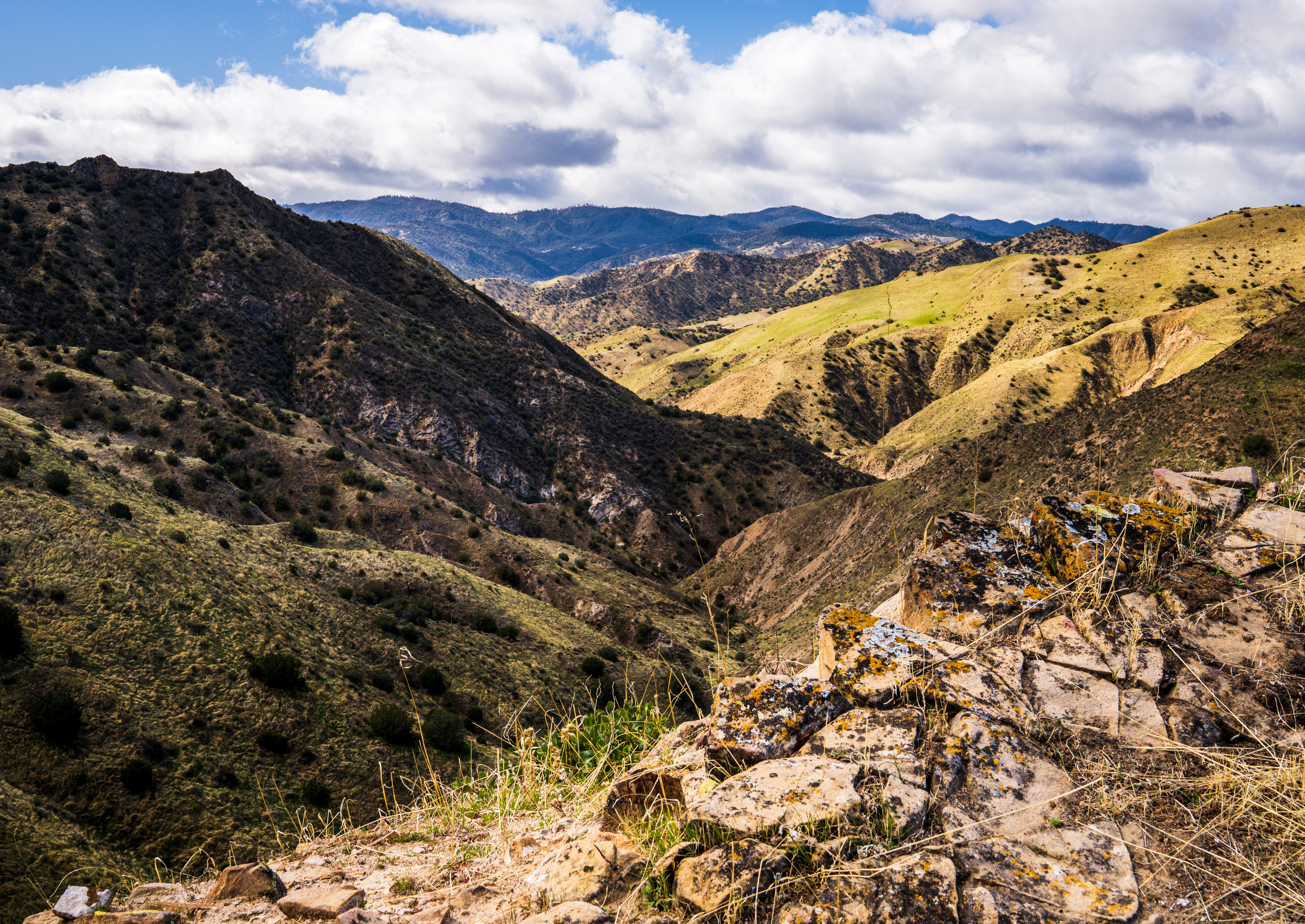

Highest point
- Elevation: 785 m (2,575 ft)

Geography
- Location within California
- Country: United States
- State: California
- District: San Benito County
- Range coordinates: 36°31′24.836″N 120°44′0.630″W
- Topo map: USGS Tumey Hills

The Griswold Hills are a low mountain range in the Southern Inner California Coast Ranges System, in southeastern San Benito County, central California.

They are east of the Diablo Range, on the west side of the San Joaquin Valley. They define the southern Panoche Valley.

The Bureau of Land Management operates the Griswold Hills Day Use Area.
