= Rancho Ex-Mission San José =

Mexican land grant in California

Coordinates: 37°33′01″N 121°57′47″W

Rancho Ex-Mission San José was a 30,000-acre (120 km^{2}) Mexican land grant in present-day Alameda County, California, given in 1846 by Governor Pio Pico to Andrés Pico and Juan B. Alvarado. The grant derives its name from the secularized Mission San José, and was called ex-Mission because of a division made of the lands held in the name of the Mission—the church retaining the grounds immediately around, and all of the lands outside of this are called ex-Mission lands. The grant extended to the lands of present-day Fremont including the former towns, now districts of Centerville, Irvington and Mission San Jose.

== History ==
Rancho Ex-Mission San José of 30,000 acres, in what is now Alameda County, was granted May 5, 1846, by Pio Pico to Andres Pico and Juan B. Alvarado.

In 1850 Elias L. Beard, and John M. Horner acquired Alvarado's interest in the Rancho and began large scale farming of vegetables, potatoes and grain for the gold camps. They also began surveying and selling land in the Centerville area. In 1853, Beard, and Horner declared bankruptcy, due to a glut of potatoes on the market and a financial panic and the Ex Mission lands were acquired by their creditors. They also sold more of the land to more people.

With the cession of California to the United States following the Mexican–American War, the 1848 Treaty of Guadalupe Hidalgo provided that the land grants would be honored. As required by the Land Act of 1851, a claim 110 for Rancho Ex-Mission San José was filed with the Public Land Commission in 1852. Claimants before the Land Commission were Andrés Pico and Elias L. Beard, and John M. Horner who had bought out Alvarado's share. The land claim was filed March 22d, 1852, confirmed by the Commission December 18, 1855, but rejected by the Northern District Court (case 407ND) on June 30, 1859.

The 180 land titles on the Ex Mission San Jose lands thrown into doubt by the 1859 court decision, were settled by the 1865 Act of Congress, "An Act for the Relief of the Occupants of the Lands of the Ex Mission of San Jose in the State of California". The land was surveyed and partitioned into parcels. Claimants could then buy their land back at the rate of $1.25 per acre.
