= Mustang (brogan) =

- CHESAPEAKE BAY BROGAN MUSTANG
- U.S. National Register of Historic Places
- Location within Maryland Location within the United States
- Location: Dock St., Annapolis, Maryland
- Coordinates: 38°58′36″N 76°29′11″W
- Built: 1907
- Architect: Moore Bros.
- Architectural style: Log and frame brogan
- NRHP reference No.: 80001778
- Added to NRHP: April 02, 1980

The Mustang is a Chesapeake Bay brogan, built in 1907. She is located at Annapolis, Anne Arundel County, Maryland.

She was listed on the National Register of Historic Places in 1980.
