= Mustang Creek (Johnson County) =

Coordinates: 32°10′01″N 97°23′00″W

Mustang Creek is a stream primarily located in Johnson County, with a section in Hill County in Texas.

The stream rises six miles east of Cleburne and flows southwest for fourteen miles before meeting the Nolan River near Blum.

== See also ==
- List of rivers of Texas
