= Aguaje Canyon =

Aguaje Canyon Stream
- Location of mouth

Location
- Country: United States
- State: Colorado
- County: Las Animas County

Physical characteristics
- Mouth
  - coordinates: 37°13′46″N 103°43′52″W
  - elevation: 5,351 ft (1,631 m)

Basin features
- River system: Purgatoire River

Aguaje Canyon is a canyon stream in Las Animas County, Colorado, United States. Its mouth is located at an elevation of 5,351 feet (1,631 m). Its source is at an elevation of 5,445 feet (1,660 m) at 37°13′20″N 103°44′23″W. A spring, or aguaje, is found at its head from which flows as a tributary stream into the Chacuaco Creek at its canyon mouth in Chacuaco Canyon, which is a tributary of the Purgatoire River.
