= Pentland, California =

Unincorporated community in California, United States

Pentland
- Former community
- Location in California Pentland (the United States)
- Coordinates: 35°03′36″N 119°21′23″W
- Country: United States
- State: California
- County: Kern
- Elevation: 646 ft (197 m)

Pentland was an unincorporated community in Kern County, California, United States. It is located on the Sunset Railroad, 2.5 miles (4 km) east of Maricopa, at an elevation of 646 feet (197 m).
