= Mustang Sally =

Mustang Sally may refer to:

- "Mustang Sally" (song), written and recorded by Mack Rice, later covered by The Rascals and Wilson Pickett
- "Mustang Sally & GTO", a song from blues musician John Lee Hooker's More Real Folk Blues: The Missing Album
- Mustang Sally (film), a 2006 horror movie
- Salvatore "Mustang Sally" Intile, a minor character on The Sopranos
