= Mustang Creek (California) =

- Etymology: Spanish
- Native name: Arroyo de Mesteño (Spanish)

Location
- Country: United States
- State: California
- Region: Merced County

Physical characteristics
- Source
  - location: head on the side of a 1254 foot mountain, 0.2 mi southeast of Madera County line.
  - coordinates: 37°11′58″N 121°07′57″W
  - elevation: 850 ft (260 m)
- Mouth
  - coordinates: 37°12′27″N 121°04′54″W
  - elevation: 230 ft (70 m)
- Length: 4.5 mi (7.2 km)

Mustang Creek, originally Arroyo de Mesteño (Mustang Creek), later Mustang Gulch, is a short stream that fails to reach the San Joaquin River draining the slopes of part of foothills of the Diablo Range within the Central Valley of California, United States. The Creek has its source in a canyon at the foot of a 1254-foot mountain about 4.5 miles from its mouth just east of where it emerges from the foothills in Merced County, shortly ending just west of the California Aqueduct. The closest populated place was the former settlement and railroad station of Gustine that is 6.69 miles northeast of the mouth of Mustang Creek.

== History ==
Arroyo de Mesteño was a watering place on El Camino Viejo in the San Joaquin Valley between Arroyo de las Garzas and Arroyo Quinto.
