= Cox & Clark Trading Post and Steamboat Landing =

Coordinates: 35.96898°N 119.93929°W

Cox & Clark Trading Post was an adobe building on the west shore of Tulare Lake. It was at that time the only building on that side of the lake and was located on the lakeshore 3 miles (4.8 km) southwest of the modern Kettleman City, in Kings County, California, United States.

Established in 1870 by the meat market and cattle business of Cox and Clark as a trading-post for the Indians it also served as a landing place for steamboats on the west side of the lake. Cox & Clark held extensive holdings in Tulare, Kern, San Luis Obispo, Sutter, and Yuba counties, as well as in Lake County in Oregon. In the vicinity of the trading post they owned land along the shoreline of Tulare Lake, where the tule marshes were pasture for cattle in dry years.
