= Polvadero Gap =

Mountain pass in California, United States

Coordinates: 36.120°N 120.199°W

Polvadero Gap, at an elevation of 554 ft (169 m), is a gap in Fresno County, California.

The name "Polvadero" is derived from the Spanish word meaning "dusty". The gap was so named from the frequent dust storms there.
