= Pueblo de las Juntas, California =

Former settlement in Fresno County, California, United States of America

Coordinates: 36.77938°N 120.37203°W

Pueblo de las Juntas (also La Juntas and Fresno) is a former settlement in Fresno County, California, United States situated at the confluence of the San Joaquin River and Fresno Slough, 2 miles (3.2 km) north of Mendota.

Pueblo de las Juntas was one of the first places settled by Spaniards in San Joaquin Valley in 1810. The name las Juntas (Spanish: the junctions), a reference to the location at the confluence of two streams. The name fresno (Spanish: ash tree) commemorates two large ash trees growing on the riverbank at the site. It was connected to the coast settlements via a route west along Panoche Creek to Panoche Pass in the Diablo Range, to Tres Pinos and northwest to Mission San Juan Bautista and west to Monterey. It was also on the eastern route of El Camino Viejo.
