= Romero Creek =

- Etymology: Spanish
- Native name: El Arroyo de Romero (Spanish)

Location
- Country: United States
- State: California
- Region: Merced County, Stanislaus County

Physical characteristics
- Source: source
  - location: in a canyon a 1/2 mile east of Bone Spring Hill, near Eagle Spring., Merced County
  - coordinates: 37°09′40.5″N 121°13′24″W
  - elevation: 2,400 ft (730 m)
- Mouth: mouth
  - location: near the Delta Mendota Canal., Merced County
  - coordinates: 37°07′29″N 121°02′46″W
  - elevation: 200 ft (61 m)

Romero Creek, originally El Arroyo de Romero, is a tributary stream of the San Joaquin River. Its source drains the slopes of the Diablo Range within the Central Valley of California, United States.

The Creek has its source in Stanislaus County in a canyon a half mile east of Bone Spring Hill, 2509 feet high, near Eagle Spring, about 12 1/2 miles from its mouth just east of where it emerges from the foothills in Merced County, shortly ending where it meets the Delta Mendota Canal.

== History ==
El Arroyo de Romero was a watering place on El Camino Viejo in the San Joaquin Valley between Arroyo de Quinto and Arroyo de San Luis Gonzaga.
