= Elkhorn Hills =

- Location within California Location within the United States

Highest point
- Elevation: 848 m (2,782 ft)

Geography
- Country: United States
- State: California
- District: San Luis Obispo County
- Range coordinates: 35°2′27.894″N 119°32′29.445″W
- Topo map: USGS Elkhorn Hills

The Elkhorn Hills are a low mountain range in the Transverse Ranges, in eastern San Luis Obispo County, California.

They are near the Elk Hills on the east in Kern County, California
