= Aguaje (geographic locale) =

Spanish word used in Western Hemisphere placenames

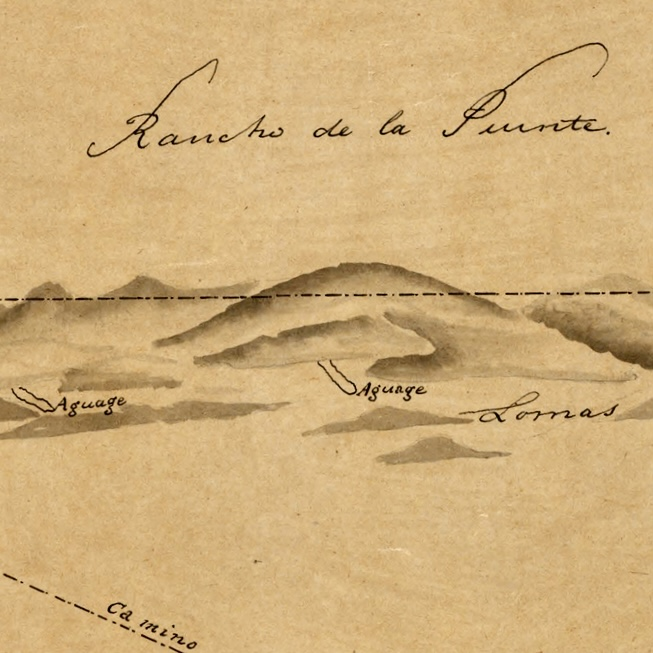
Example of aguaje (landform), appearing here on the diseño for the Rancho La Habra pre-statehood land grant in California

Aguaje is a Spanish word with several meanings related to water. When used for its meaning as a watering place, aguaje is a geographic locale which can be a spring, a stream, arroyo or other natural water feature or a well that reliably provides water for people and their livestock. When used for a natural watering place, the word "abrevadero," (which also means a water trough), is sometimes used instead.

Aguaje in this context, are seen particularly in unpopulated, dry or desert locations within the bounds of the old Spanish Empire in North and South America. There Aguaje may also become part of the name of populated places. In the United States they are found in Arizona, California, Colorado, New Mexico and Texas were most have received new English names often translations of the original Spanish name.

Some examples of these are:

- Aguaje Canyon a canyon with a stream in Las Animas County, Colorado.
- Arroyo Aguaje de la Petaca an arroyo in Taos County, New Mexico.
- Aguaje Draw a valley with a stream in Apache County, Arizona.
- Aguajes Windmill a locale (well) in Jim Hogg County, Texas
- Rancho Aguaje de la Centinela a land grant rancho named for the Aguaje de la Centinela, that is now Inglewood and Westchester a neighborhood in Los Angeles in Los Angeles County, California.
- Mud Spring formerly Aguaje Lodoso (Muddy Watering Place), an aguaje, in Los Angeles County, California, one of many along the route of the El Camino Viejo.
