= Arroyo Aguaje de la Petaca =

Dry stream in New Mexico

Arroyo Aguaje de la Petaca is a stream or arroyo in Taos County, and Rio Arriba County, New Mexico. Its mouth is at an elevation of 6,050 feet (1,840 meters), at its confluence with the Rio Grande in Cañon del Rio Grande in Taos County. Its source is at an elevation of 9,135 feet (2,784 m), at 36°46′17″N 106°07′26″W at Cisneros Park in the Carson National Forest in Rio Arriba County, New Mexico.
