= Kreyenhagen Hills =

Range of foothills in the American state of California

- Location within California

Highest point
- Elevation: 1,188 m (3,898 ft)

Geography
- Country: United States
- State: California
- District: Fresno County
- Range coordinates: 35°58′02″N 120°10′58″W
- Topo map(s): USGS Kreyenhagen Hills, Kettleman Plain, Garza Peak, The Dark Hole, Avenal, Curry Mountain

The Kreyenhagen Hills are a range of foothills of the Diablo Range in western Fresno County and Kings County, California. The Kreyenhagen Hills form a long foothill belt in the soft formations between Reef Ridge and Kettleman Plain. They are divided into several groups, each a few miles wide, by streams crossing them at right angles. They meet with the steep face of Reef Ridge, and are distinct from the mountains which begin there. To the northeast the strata form ridge after ridge, parallel to each other, and extend the length of the separate divisions between the main stream valleys. These ridges, appear like a series of waves advancing, toward Reef Ridge, and elsewhere to broken waves, as in a choppy sea. The ridges are slightly asymmetric, the northeast flank being a dip slope and fairly smooth, while the southwest flank is a steeper, strike face that is in many places eroded so as to leave sharp gullies and conical intermediate ridges extending outward. The groups of hillocks so produced bear some resemblance to an encampment of tents or huts, and the name Jacalitos, (meaning the little huts), may have been applied to Jacalitos Creek owing to this feature of the hills through which it flows. The greatest symmetry of the parallel ridges appear's in the portion of the Kreyenhagen Hills between Jacalitos Creek and Big Tar Canyon, and there the long, straight, smooth troughs between the ridges doubtless gave rise to the name Canoas, meaning trough, applied to Canoas Creek which passes across the central portion of the hills. Kreyenhagen was the name of the family who originally owned the land in the area.

In the northern group of the Kreyenhagen Hills, the slope toward Jacalitos Creek on the northwest is steeper and shorter than that toward Zapato Chino Creek on the southeast. The major part of the drainage flows in the latter direction. In the groups of hills between the other streams farther south such a feature is not so clearly to be made out, but it is true that the course taken by the drainage is predominantly toward the southeast. Toward the south the Kreyenhagen Hills become more worn, decline in elevation, and lose their relief. Prominent individual features are absent, and the foothill area is a rolling surface with low ridges and broad drainages sloping gradually toward and merging with the Kettleman Plain.
