= Las Juntas, Ambato =

Coordinates: 28°08′S 65°54′W

Las Juntas Las Juntas
- Locality
- Location in Catamarca Province
- Province: Catamarca
- Department: Ambato

Government
  - Mayor: Jorge Herrera
- Elevation: 1,609 m (5,279 ft)

Population (2001)
  - Total: 322
- Time zone: UTC−3
- Argentine Postal Code: K4715
- Telephone prefix: 0383
- Municipality type: 6th category municipality

Las Juntas (Ambato) is a village and municipality in Catamarca Province in northwestern Argentina.
