= Carneros Creek (Santos Creek tributary) =

- Etymology: Spanish
- Native name: Arroyo de Los Carneros (Spanish)

Location
- Country: United States
- State: California
- Region: San Luis Obispo County, Kern County

Physical characteristics
- Source: source
  - location: on the east slope of the Temblor Range., San Luis Obispo County
  - coordinates: 35°24′52″N 119°55′27″W
  - elevation: 3,340 ft (1,020 m)
- Mouth: mouth
  - location: at its confluence with Santos Creek northwest of the Bacon Hills., Kern County
  - coordinates: 35°28′58″N 119°49′51″W
  - elevation: 915 ft (279 m)

Carneros Creek, formerly Arroyo de Los Carneros (Creek of the Rams) is a stream with its source located on the east slope of the Temblor Range in San Luis Obispo County. It flows generally westward, until it emerges from the foothills of the Temblor Range, where it turns northwestward until it terminates at its confluence with Santos Creek, northwest of the Bacon Hills, in Kern County, California.

== History ==
Arroyo de Los Carneros was a stream and a watering place on El Camino Viejo between Chico Martinez Creek in the south and Aguaje de en Media to the north. The watering place of Carneros Spring is located at the foot of Carneros Rocks an outcropping of Vaqueros sandstone, to their east and south of the creek before it emerges from the foothills of the Temblor Range. It may have been named for the Bighorn Sheep that once lived in the area.
