= Asphalto, California =

Asphalto
- Former settlement
- Location in California
- Coordinates: 35°18′17″N 119°36′03″W
- Country: United States
- State: California
- County: Kern
- Elevation: 932 ft (284 m)

Asphalto is an archaic place name in Kern County, California, United States. Asphalto, also known as La Brea, was located on the railroad 3 miles (4.8 km) northeast of McKittrick, at an elevation of 932 feet (284 m). Asphalto still appeared on maps as of 1932. The name comes from the local asphaltum deposits.

Asphalto was originally the site of the Aguaje de La Brea, a watering place on El Camino Viejo. The site has fossils in the asphalt deposits here, similar to other places in the vicinity of McKittrick. A post office operated at Asphalto from 1893 to 1894, and from 1898 to 1900, when service was transferred to McKittrick.

== See also ==
- List of ghost towns in California
