= Garza Creek =

- Native name: El Arroyo de las Garzas (Spanish)

Location
- Country: United States
- State: California
- Region: Kings County

Physical characteristics
- Source: source
  - location: on the north slope of Zwang Peak of the Diablo Range., Kings County, California
  - coordinates: 35°56′53″N 120°15′01″W
  - elevation: 3,081 ft (939 m)
- Mouth: mouth
  - location: terminates in the Kettleman Plain, 1.6 miles south of Kettleman Station., Kings County, California
  - coordinates: 36°01′37″N 120°11′08″W
  - elevation: 778 ft (237 m)

Garza Creek, originally El Arroyo de las Garzas (The Creek of the Herons). Its source on the north slope of Zwang Peak of the Diablo Range, in Kings County.

It flows east-northeast through Kreyenhagen Hills to terminate in the Kettleman Plain, 3.6 miles west northwest of Avenal in the San Joaquin Valley.

== Geography ==
Garza Creek's watershed encompasses part of the western slope of the southern Diablo Range. Its intermittent flow is typical of streams in the arid California Coast Ranges, where water typically appears following winter and spring rains. The Kreyenhagen Hills and Kettleman Plain region have been shaped by tectonic uplift and erosion, with the creek helping to delineate local valleys and agricultural boundaries.

== History ==
The watercourse known as Arroyo de las Garzas served as a watering place along the historic El Camino Viejo trail, which connected early settlements and mining areas of central California before the advent of railroads.

This creek was the place first settled by Dave Kettelman, a 49er who went back to the Missouri River, and returned with a herd of cattle, which he pastured on his ranch in the Kettleman Plain and the Kettleman Hills west of Tulare Lake.

His name was later given to Kettleman Station, Kettleman City and the Kettleman North Dome Oil Field.
