= Hills Ferry, California =

Unincorporated community in California, United States

Hills Ferry was a small unincorporated community of the northern San Joaquin Valley in Stanislaus County, California, United States. Hills Ferry was located at 37°20′56″N 120°58′47″W, on the southern border of Stanislaus County with Merced County, 3 miles (4.8 km) northeast of the city of Newman.

Hills Ferry is just west of the river mouth of the Merced River, at its confluence with the San Joaquin River.

== History ==
A ferry across the San Joaquin River was established in 1850, and by 1854 was transferred to Jesse Hill, resulting in the name Hill's Ferry. The ferry quickly became a shipping point for grain grown in the surrounding area, and was particularly busy during the autumn harvest. By the late 1870s, Hill's Ferry had hundreds of residents with many more in the surrounding ranches. When the railroad was built through Newman in 1888, Hill's Ferry quickly declined. The Simon Newman Company store building was in Hills Ferry, which later served as Fisher's Opera House until demolished in 1904.

In July 1906, a fire near Hills Ferry and Newman destroyed 2,500 acres of wheat and barley and 20,000 acres of pasture, along with hay, farm equipment and buildings. "Not even the shadows of a ghost town" remained as of 1976.

In May 1868, Scottish botanist John Muir crossed here on his walk from Oakland to Yosemite. (Muir, John, “Rambles of a Botanist Among the Plants and Climates of California” (1872)
