= Zwang Peak =

Mountain in United States of America

- Location within California

Highest point
- Elevation: 3,081 ft (939 m) NGVD 29
- Coordinates: 35°56′48″N 120°14′52″W

Geography
- Location: Kings County, California, U.S.
- Parent range: Diablo Range
- Topo map: USGS Garza Peak

Zwang Peak is a mountain in the Diablo Range, 8 miles (13 km) southwest of Avenal, and about 12 miles (19 km) from Interstate 5 in Kings County, California. Its summit is at an elevation of 3,081 feet (939 m). The peak was named for cattle rancher Jake Zwang (1880–1968), who came to the area in 1906 to start a cattle ranch southwest of Avenal. Garza Creek has its source near this peak.
