= Ingomar, California =

Unincorporated community in California, United States

Ingomar
- Unincorporated community
- Location in California Ingomar (the United States)
- Coordinates: 37°10′49″N 120°58′06″W
- Country: United States
- State: California
- County: Merced
- Elevation: 92 ft (28 m)

Ingomar was an unincorporated community in Merced County, California, United States. It was located on the Southern Pacific Railroad, 10.5 miles (17 km) northwest of Los Banos, at an elevation of 92 feet (28 m).

A post office operated at Ingomar from 1890 to 1921. The name was probably derived from the 1842 German play Ingomar, the Barbarian by Baron Eligius Franz Joseph von Münch-Bellinghausen, a popular work in the dramatic canon in the late 19th century.

A school was established at Ingomar in 1884, and the town was surveyed when the railroad was built through the area in 1889. The economy was centered on farming and dairying; in the early 1910s there was a school, blacksmith shop, general store, cream-shipping depot, and housing facility for railroad work crews. The town declined in importance due to the closure of the post office and fouling of the water; only foundations remained as of 2009.
