= Pyramid Hills =

Mountain range in Kings County, California, U.S.

- Location within California

Highest point
- Elevation: 252 m (827 ft)

Geography
- Country: United States
- State: California
- District: Kings County
- Range coordinates: 35°48′59.856″N 120°1′33.495″W
- Topo map: USGS Pyramid Hills

The Pyramid Hills are a mountain range in the interior California Coast Ranges, in western Kings County, California.

When viewed from afar, the conical Pyramid Hills are said to resemble pyramids, hence the name.
