= Panoche Creek =

Panoche Creek Big Panoche
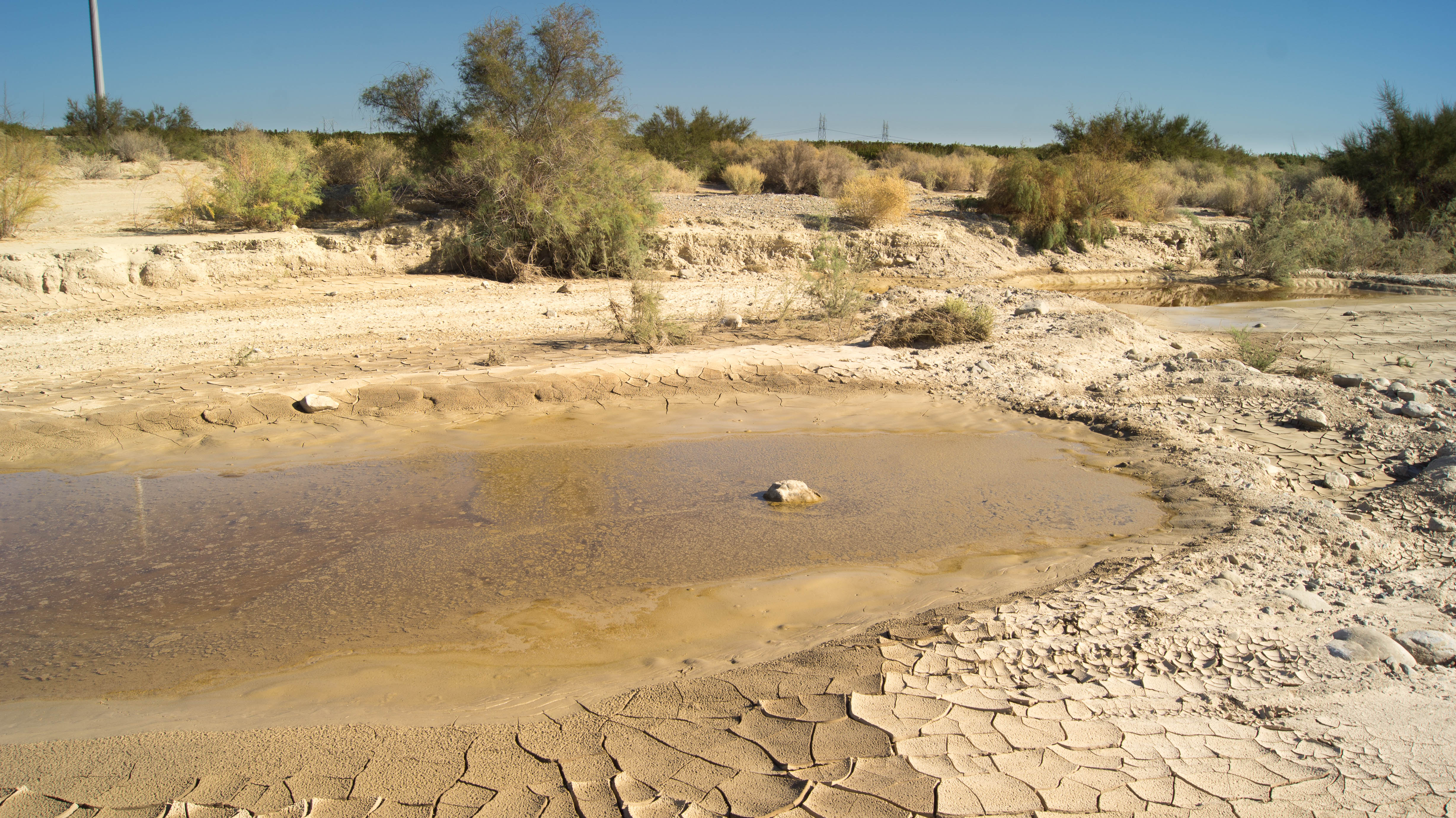
- Etymology: big sugarloaf creek
- Native name: Arroyo de Panoche Grande (Spanish)

Location
- Country: United States
- State: California
- Region: Fresno County

Physical characteristics
- Source: source
  - location: Drains the higher portion of the Diablo Range west of Llanada., San Benito County
  - coordinates: 36°37′32″N 121°00′30″W
  - elevation: 2,070 ft (630 m)
- Mouth: mouth
  - location: empties into the San Joaquin Valley, 7.3 miles west of Mendota., Fresno County
  - coordinates: 36°44′55″N 120°30′48″W
  - elevation: 259 ft (79 m)

Panoche Creek is a creek in San Benito and Fresno Counties, California, in the United States.

Historical names include Arroyo de Panoche Grande (Big Sugarloaf Creek) and the anglicized Big Panoche Creek. For a time its lower reaches were called "Silver Creek."

The source of Panoche Creek is a pond just east of Panoche Pass in the Diablo Range. It flows to the east through the Panoche Valley into the San Joaquin Valley west of Mendota near the former site of Hayes Station.

Panoche Creek has the largest drainage area of any stream on the east slope of the Diablo Range.

== History ==
Arroyo de Panoche Grande was part of a route between the Indian settlements of the central coast of California and the San Joaquin Valley. It was also a watering place on El Camino Viejo between Arroyita de Panoche (Little Sugarloaf Creek) and Arroyo de Cantua (Cantua Creek).

Spanish soldiers followed Panoche Creek on expeditions to explore the region. It was an area of frequent conflict with local native peoples, who raided mission properties and were subject to conversion during the period of Indian Reductions. Vaqueros and musteneros followed the creek into the San Joaquin Valley to round up cattle and horses, respectively.

Both Panoche Creek and Panoche Valley, are referred to as the "Big Panoche", distinguishing them from the Little Panoche Creek, and valley.
