= Helm Field =

US Army training airfield in Fresno County, California

Helm Field
- Part of Army Air Force Training Command
- Coalinga, California
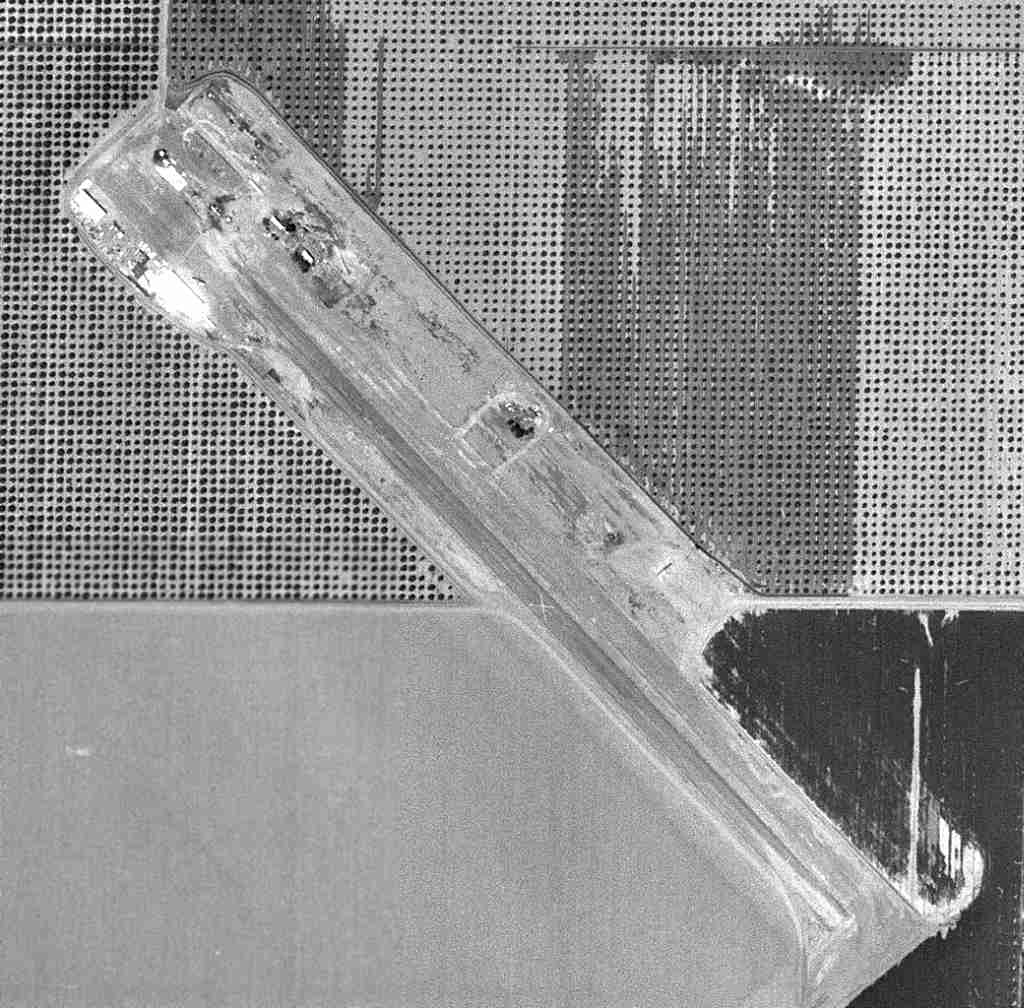
- USGS 1971 photo showing one of the two Helm Field runways

Site information
- Type: Army Airfield
- Controlled by: United States Army Air Forces

Location
- Coordinates: 36°21′0″N 120°10′26.4″W

Site history
- Built: 1943
- In use: 1943-1945

Garrison information
- Garrison: Army Air Force Training Command

Helm Field also called Lemoore Auxiliary Army Airfield A-7 is a former US Army Airfield use for training during World War II. Helm Field was location in the town of Coalinga, California, 70 miles south of Fresno. Helm Field had two 3,000 foot runways, one oriented east/west and one oriented northwest–southeast. The Airfield was on a 773 acres site of form farm land. The US Army purchased the land on January 11, 1943 for training pilots. The Airfield was used by the Lemoore Basic Flying School, based at the Lemoore Army Air Field. Helm Field was 15 miles northwest of Lemoore Army Air Field. The Army built at Helm Field to support training stage house, control tower, motor pool building, crash truck shelter and latrines. Helm Field was used by Air Corps Basic Flying School, the AAF Basic Flying School, the AAF Pilot School, the 88th Air Base Squadron, the 3023rd Army Air Force Pilot School and the 461st Army Air Force Base Unit. The army closed Helm Field on October 15, 1844 and the Airfield was sold by the War Assets Administration. Helm Field was used as a farm labor camp in the 1950s. The east–west runway was returned to farmland. The northwest–southeast runway was still intact and was used as a civilian airfield till 1971.

== Lemoore Auxiliary Airfields ==
To support the Lemoore Basic Flying School, based at Lemoore Army Air Field Auxiliary Airfields and Landing Mats were built around the Lemoore Army Air Field.

=== Boston Field ===
Boston Field also called Lemoore Auxiliary Army Airfield (A-1) was located at 36°13′12″N 119°59′20″W near Westhaven, Fresno County, California. After the war the Airfield was abandoned and returned to farmland. Boston Field was 3 miles south/west of Lemoore Army Airfield. The Airfield is listed as Bond Field on some later maps.

=== Huron Field ===
Huron Field also called Lemoore Auxiliary Army Airfield (A-2) was located at 36°13′21″N 120°02′22″W, near the City of Huron, California. Huron Field was 7 miles west-southwest of Lemoore Army Airfield. This was a 3,000 by 3,000 foot landing mat. After the war the Airfield was abandoned and returned to farmland.

=== Indian Field ===
(for crops see Indian old field)

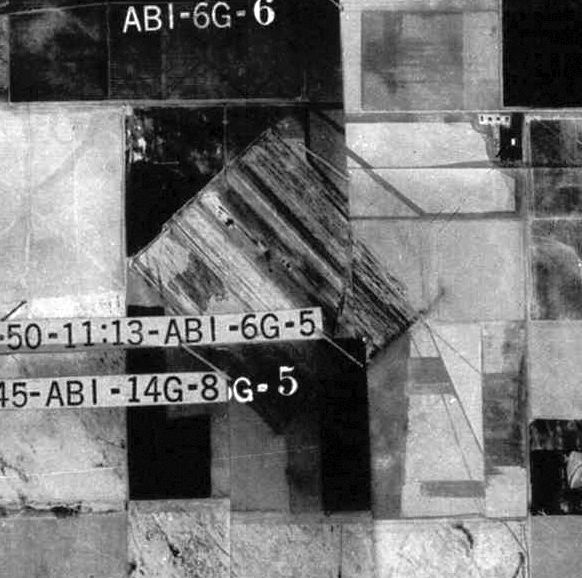
Indian Field March 13, 1950 USDA aerial photo

Indian Field also called Lemoore Auxiliary Army Airfield (A-3), Indian Auxiliary Landing Field and Indian Auxiliary Field No. 3 was located at 36°07′53″N 120°05′06″W, near the city of Huron, California at the corner of South Siskiyou Avenue and West Jayne Avenue. The 641.60 acres site was native pasture land, the air field was built in 1944. Prior to acquisition, the site was native pasture This was a 3,000 by 3,000 foot landing mat. Indian Field was 13 miles southwest of Lemoore Army Airfield. The land was sold on September 12, 1946 and turned into farmland. The 1950s Indian Field was used as a farm labor camp and the runway was not used. Late the Airfield was abandoned and returned to farmland.

=== Murray Field ===
Murray Field also called Lemoore Auxiliary Army Airfield (A-4) was located at 36°08′41″N 119°56′00″W, 6 miles southwest of Stratford, California, near the current town of Avenal, California. The 621.76 acres site was purchased in 1941. Murray Field was 14 miles west of Lemoore Army Airfield . This was a 3,000 by 3,000 foot landing mat. After the war the Airfield was abandoned and returned to farmland.

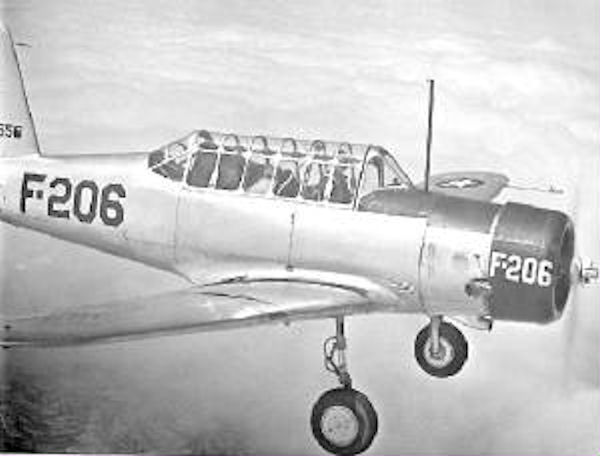
Vultee BT-13 Valiant in California, an Army training plane

=== West Field ===
West Field also called Lemoore Auxiliary Army Airfield (A-5) was located at 36°15′45″N 120°12′06″W, near Huron, California. This was a 3,000 by 3,000 foot landing mat on 522.32 acres. West Field was 14 miles west of Lemoore Army Airfield. The Army purchased the farmland on 4 February 1943. After the war the Airfield was abandoned and returned to farmland, that land was sold off on 12 September 1947.

== Other Lemoore Auxiliary Fields ==
- Coalinga Municipal Airport was used a both as Auxiliary Field and as the Coalinga Emergency Landing Field. Coalinga Municipal Airport was 22 miles west-southwest of Lemoore Field. Located at 36°09′27″N 120°21′35″W in Coalinga, California. This airfield is now closed, as a new Airport was built called the New Coalinga Municipal Airport.
- Porterville Army Airfield, located at 36°01′46″N 119°03′43″W was used buas an Auxiliary Field. Now called the Portersville Municipal Airport in Porterville, California.
- Corcoran Municipal Airport, located at 36°06′08″N 119°35′40″W one mile west of Corcoran, California was built to support training. After the war the 220 acres site became the Corcoran Municipal Airport. The farmland was purchased by the Army on October 13, 1941.
- Summit Lake Field located at 36°20′22″N 119°56′49″W in Lemoore Station, California was used to support training at Lemoore Field. Summit Lake Field is three miles north of Lemoore Airfield. The Summit Lake Field is listed as Summit Field on some maps. The land of Summit Lake Field became Naval Air Station Lemoore.

== See also ==
- California during World War II
- American Theater (1939–1945)
- Desert Training Center
- Military history of the United States during World War II
- United States home front during World War II
