= Coalinga Municipal Airport (Old) =

Airport in California, United States

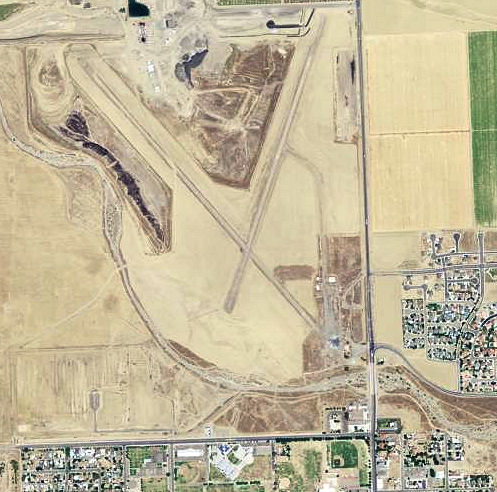
- 2006 USGS airphoto
- IATA: none; ICAO: none

Summary
- Coordinates: 36°09′27″N 120°21′35″W

Map
- Location of Coalinga Municipal Airport (Old)

Runways
Direction	Length		Surface
Direction	ft	m	Surface
12/30	5,280	1,609	Asphalt
01/19	4,120	1,256	Asphalt

Coalinga Municipal Airport (Old) is a closed airport located 1 mile north of Coalinga, California. The airport was closed approximately in the year 2000; all aviation use was moved to the New Coalinga Municipal Airport.

== History ==
It was established sometime in the 1920s. It is known that Army Air Corps units trained at the airport during the 1930s. Later, during World War II, the airport was used an auxiliary training airfield for Minter Field Army Airfield, and Lemoore Army Airfield, California.

It was released to civil use at the end of the war, and was the municipal airport for the local area. It was closed approximately in 2000. The reason for the closure was the land the airport sits on was leased from Chevron Corporation and the Federal Aviation Administration will not give grant money for improvements to airports on non public owned lands. As of 2012 traces of it can still be seen on aerial photographs and satellite images. Most buildings have been torn down and the concrete parking areas as well as other parts of the airfield are deteriorating. The property has been used at various times as storage and Emergency Vehicle Operation training.

== See also ==
- California World War II Army Airfields
- Boston Field (A-1)
- Huron Field (A-2)
- Indian Field (A-3)
- Murray Field
- West Field (A-5)
- Summit Lake Field
- Helm Field (A-7)
- Corcoran Municipal Airport
- Porterville Army Airfield
