= Huron, California =

City in California, United States

- City
- City of Huron
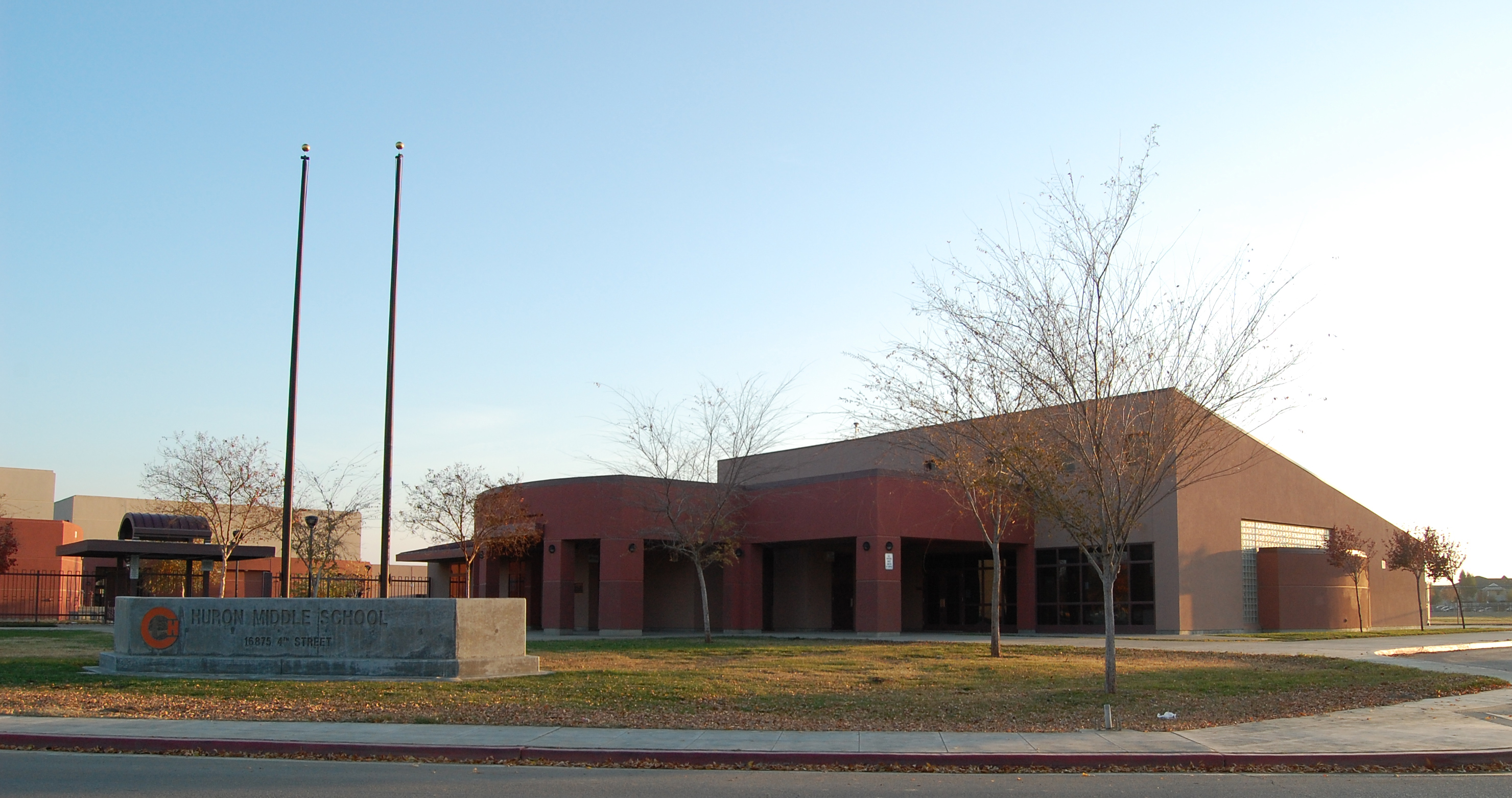
- Huron Middle School

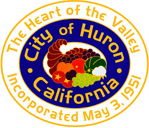
- Seal
- Interactive map of Huron, California
- Location in California Location in the United States
- Coordinates: 36°12′10″N 120°06′11″W
- Country: United States
- State: California
- County: Fresno
- Incorporated: May 3, 1951

Government
  - Mayor: Rey Leon
  - State senator: Anna Caballero (D)
  - State assemblyman: Esmeralda Soria (D)
  - Congressman: Adam Gray (D)

Area
  - Total: 1.60 sq mi (4.14 km^{2})
  - Land: 1.60 sq mi (4.14 km^{2})
  - Water: 0 sq mi (0.00 km^{2}) 0%
- Elevation: 374 ft (114 m)

Population (2020)
  - Total: 6,206
  - Density: 3,880/sq mi (1,500/km^{2})
- Time zone: UTC-08:00 (PST)
  - Summer (DST): UTC-07:00 (PDT)
- ZIP code: 93234
- Area code: 559
- FIPS code: 06-36084
- GNIS feature IDs: 1652725, 2410081
- Website: huronca.gov

Huron is a small city in Fresno County, California, in the United States. As of the 2020 census, the population was 6,206, down from 6,754 at the 2010 census. During the harvest season, the population swells to over 15,000 people due to the influx of migrant farm workers. Huron is located 15 miles (24 km) east-northeast of Coalinga, at an elevation of 374 feet (114 m). Huron was the city with the highest proportion of Hispanic or Latino people in the United States, according to the 2000 census.

== Geography ==
According to the United States Census Bureau, the city has a total area of 1.6 square miles (4.1 km^{2}), all land.

=== Climate ===
According to the Köppen Climate Classification system, Huron has a semi-arid climate, abbreviated "BSk" on climate maps.

== History ==
The community of Huron was founded in 1888 as a water stop along the Southern Pacific Railroad's western route, approximately 15 miles (24 km) northeast of Coalinga. One of the first structures in the community was the Huron Post Office, which operated from 1877 to 1883 and then from 1886 to the present. Huron became a boomtown in the early 20th century and has grown steadily ever since. During World War II was the site of three training landing strips called Huron Field, West Field and Indian Field, part of Lemoore Army Air Field.

== Historical significance ==
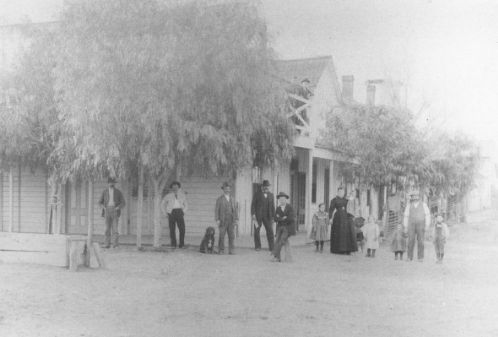
Huron Central Hotel in 1898

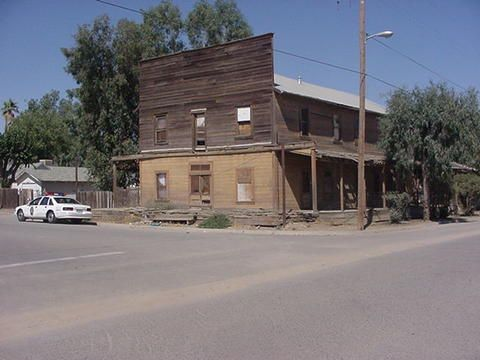
Huron Central Hotel in 2001

Joseph Mouren and his family were largely responsible for the expansion of the community of Huron in the late 19th century and fueled the city's growth into the 20th century by investment. Mouren Drive was named after Joseph Mouren, who is considered by many to be one of the city's founding fathers. In the early 20th century, Huron became one of the largest producers of wool in the nation.

== Demographics ==
Historical population
Census	Pop.	Note	%±
1960	1,269		—
1970	1,525		20.2%
1980	2,768		81.5%
1990	4,766		72.2%
2000	6,306		32.3%
2010	6,754		7.1%
2020	6,206		−8.1%
U.S. Decennial Census

=== 2020 census ===
As of the 2020 census, Huron had a population of 6,206 and a population density of 3,878.8 inhabitants per square mile (1,497.6/km^{2}). The median age was 28.3 years. The age distribution was 35.4% under the age of 18, 10.3% aged 18 to 24, 26.7% aged 25 to 44, 20.1% aged 45 to 64, and 7.5% aged 65 or older. For every 100 females, there were 103.7 males, and for every 100 females age 18 and over, there were 109.1 males age 18 and over.

The census reported that 98.9% of the population lived in households, 1.1% lived in non-institutionalized group quarters, and no one was institutionalized. Additionally, 98.8% of residents lived in urban areas, while 1.2% lived in rural areas.

There were 1,559 households, of which 60.8% had children under the age of 18 living in them. Of all households, 45.6% were married-couple households, 10.4% were cohabiting-couple households, 16.8% had a male householder with no spouse or partner present, and 27.2% had a female householder with no spouse or partner present. About 10.0% of all households were made up of individuals, and 4.5% had someone living alone who was 65 years of age or older. The average household size was 3.94. There were 1,331 families (85.4% of all households).

There were 1,610 housing units at an average density of 1,006.2 units per square mile (388.5 units/km^{2}), of which 96.8% were occupied and 3.2% were vacant. Of occupied units, 28.7% were owner-occupied and 71.3% were renter-occupied. The homeowner vacancy rate was 0.4%, and the rental vacancy rate was 3.1%.

Racial composition as of the 2020 census
Race	Number	Percent
White	891	14.4%
Black or African American	39	0.6%
American Indian and Alaska Native	123	2.0%
Asian	48	0.8%
Native Hawaiian and Other Pacific Islander	0	0.0%
Some other race	4,010	64.6%
Two or more races	1,095	17.6%
Hispanic or Latino (of any race)	5,937	95.7%

=== Income and poverty ===
In 2023, the US Census Bureau estimated that the median household income was $44,784, and the per capita income was $16,314. About 23.8% of families and 33.2% of the population were below the poverty line.

=== 2010 census ===
At the 2010 census Huron had a population of 6,754. The population density was 4,245.0 inhabitants per square mile (1,639.0/km^{2}). The racial makeup of Huron was 2,300 (34.1%) White, 66 (1.0%) African American, 77 (1.1%) Native American, 39 (0.6%) Asian, 6 (0.1%) Pacific Islander, 3,964 (58.7%) from other races, and 302 (4.5%) from two or more races. Hispanic or Latino of any race were 6,527 persons (96.6%).

The whole population lived in households, no one lived in non-institutionalized group quarters and no one was institutionalized.

There were 1,532 households, 1,025 (66.9%) had children under the age of 18 living in them, 813 (53.1%) were opposite-sex married couples living together, 367 (24.0%) had a female householder with no husband present, 155 (10.1%) had a male householder with no wife present. There were 156 (10.2%) unmarried opposite-sex partnerships, and 14 (0.9%) same-sex married couples or partnerships. 110 households (7.2%) were one person and 40 (2.6%) had someone living alone who was 65 or older. The average household size was 4.41. There were 1,335 families (87.1% of households); the average family size was 4.47.

The age distribution was 2,506 people (37.1%) under the age of 18, 903 people (13.4%) aged 18 to 24, 1,924 people (28.5%) aged 25 to 44, 1,089 people (16.1%) aged 45 to 64, and 332 people (4.9%) who were 65 or older. The median age was 24.7 years. For every 100 females, there were 111.6 males. For every 100 females age 18 and over, there were 114.7 males.

There were 1,602 housing units at an average density of 1,006.9 per square mile (388.8/km^{2}), of which 1,532 were occupied, 493 (32.2%) by the owners and 1,039 (67.8%) by renters. The homeowner vacancy rate was 1.8%; the rental vacancy rate was 3.9%. 2,380 people (35.2% of the population) lived in owner-occupied housing units and 4,374 people (64.8%) lived in rental housing units.

== Education and Government ==
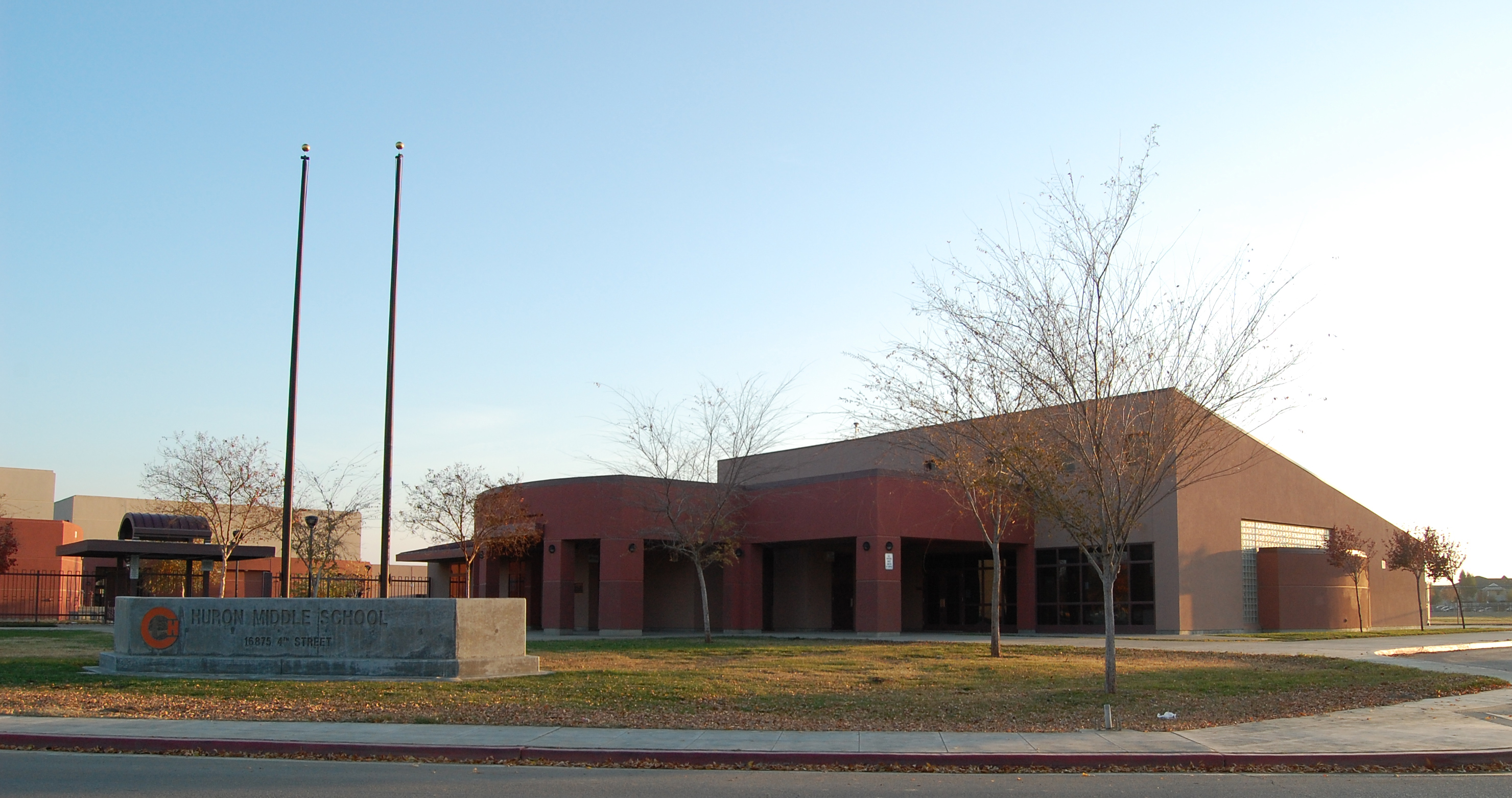
Huron Middle School, shown c. 2007

The city of Huron is within the Coalinga-Huron Joint Unified School District. The schools in Huron are:

- Huron Elementary School (Grades K-5)
- Huron Middle School (Grades 6–8)
- Fresno EOC Headstart Program
- Fresno-Madera Migrant Headstart Program

In the United States House of Representatives, Huron is in California's 13th congressional district, represented by Democrat Adam Gray as of January 2025.

== Huron Police Department ==
The City of Huron currently funds its own police department.

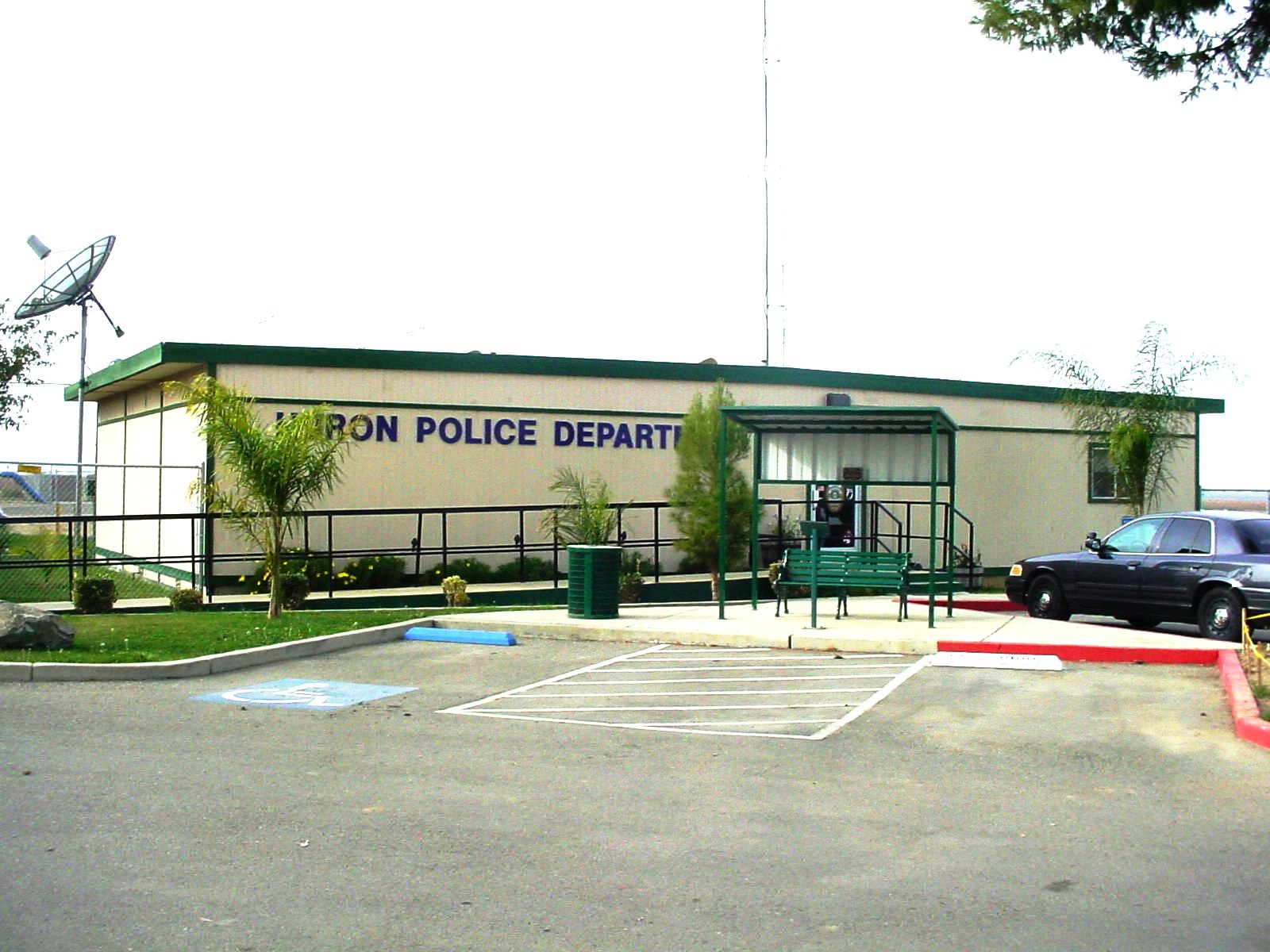
Huron Police Department, shown c. 2008

== Water issues ==
In July 2009, action by the Federal Bureau of Reclamation to protect threatened fish reduced irrigation pumping to parts of the California Central Valley, causing canals leading into Huron and the surrounding areas and the farms that rely on them to dry up. Unemployment has reached over 40% as farms dried up. Governor Schwarzenegger stated the federal action is putting the fish "above the needs of millions of Californians." The issue received coverage on the Hannity program from Fox News broadcasting from Huron. Comedian Paul Rodriguez acted as a celebrity spokesperson criticizing the action, as his mother owns a farm in the area. Fox's coverage of the issue has been criticized, and the California Progress Report argued that Huron's problems are more the result of poor water management decisions by the local water district than by the federal government. Environmental and fishing groups have argued that the action to protect fish will ultimately save more jobs in the fishing and tourism industries than will be lost in agriculture.

== Transportation ==
San Joaquin Valley Railroad acquired the former Southern Pacific lines and provides freight service from Huron to Union Pacific's Fresno Subdivision at Goshen.

Fresno County Rural Transit Agency provides bus service from Huron to Coalinga and Fresno.
