= Westhaven, Fresno County, California =

Unincorporated community in California, United States

Westhaven
- Unincorporated community
- Location in California Westhaven (the United States)
- Coordinates: 36°13′36″N 119°59′41″W
- Country: United States
- State: California
- County: Fresno
- Elevation: 279 ft (85 m)

Westhaven is an unincorporated community in Fresno County, California, United States. It is located 16 miles (26 km) south-southwest of Riverdale, at an elevation of 279 feet (85 m).

A post office operated at Westhaven from 1918 to 1958.

During World War II was the site of a training landing strip called Boston Field, part of Lemoore Army Air Field.
