= Anticline Ridge =

- Location within California

Highest point
- Elevation: 3,640 ft (1,110 m)
- Coordinates: 36°18′16.6″N 120°24′11.52″W

Geography
- Country: United States
- State: California
- District: Fresno County
- Range coordinates: 36°15′57″N 120°21′21″W
- Parent range: Diablo Range
- Topo map(s): USGS Joaquin Rocks, Domengine Ranch, Coalinga, Guijarral Hills

The Anticline Ridge is a ridge, southeast of Joaquin Ridge, declining from its 3,629 foot / 1,106 meter high point, Black Mountain in the north at 36°18′16″N 120°24′12″W, to the southeast into low hills bound on the southeast by Los Gatos Creek that divides it from the Guijarral Hills. It is located in the inner California Coast Ranges, in Fresno County, California, east of the town of Coalinga. Anticline Ridge and Guijarral Hills divides Pleasant Valley from the San Joaquin Valley to the east. California State routes 33 and 198, which join together for the stretch through and north of Coalinga, cut across the Coalinga field and cross Anticline Ridge.

Anticline Ridge is the surface expression of an anticlinal structure which continues to the south as the Guijarral Hills and Kettleman Hills, and is the location of a major part of the huge Coalinga Oil Field. The anticline in Anticline ridge continues to the southeast as the Guijarral Hills Oil Field and the Kettleman North Dome Oil Field.
