= Guijarral Hills =

Range of hills in the California Coast Ranges, Fresno County, California, USA

- Location within California

Highest point
- Elevation: 192 m (630 ft)

Geography
- Country: United States
- State: California
- District: Fresno County
- Range coordinates: 36°8′40.835″N 120°13′15.514″W
- Topo map: USGS Guijarral Hills

The Guijarral Hills are a range of low hills in the inner California Coast Ranges, in Fresno County, California, about seven miles east of the town of Coalinga. Guijarral is derived from a Spanish word meaning "heap of pebbles".

They are the surface expression of an anticlinal structure which continues to the south as the Kettleman Hills, and to the north as Anticline Ridge, a portion of the huge Coalinga Oil Field. The Guijarral Hills overlie the smaller and mostly exhausted Guijarral Hills Oil Field. Jayne Avenue, which connects Interstate 5 to Coalinga, is the major east–west road through the hills.
