= Jeffrey L. Bannister =

U.S. Army major general

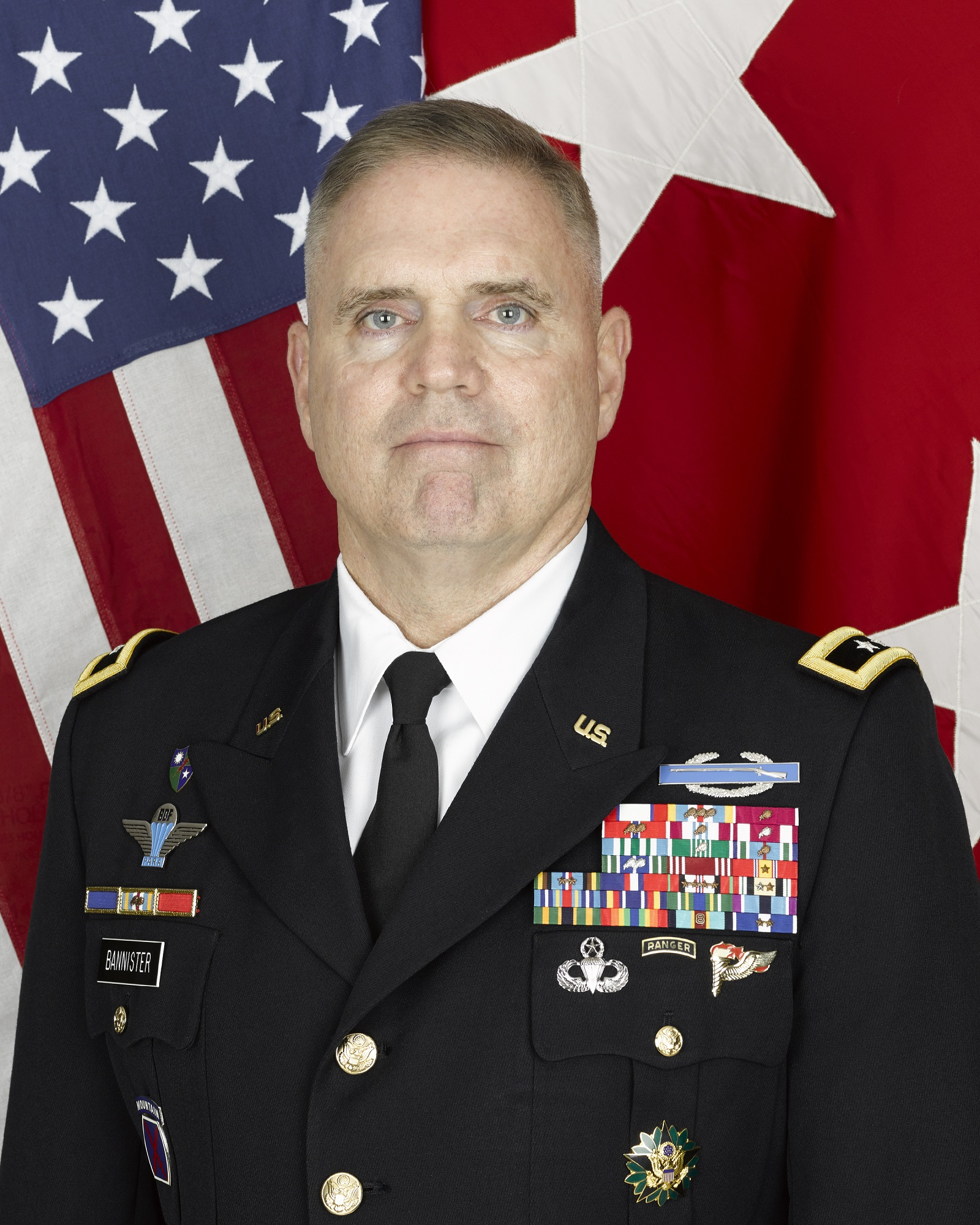
- Bannister in 2017 as commander of the 10th Mountain Division
- Born: April 7, 1961; Coalinga, California, U.S.
- Died: May 27, 2018 (aged 57); Lexington, South Carolina, U.S.
- Burial place: Arlington National Cemetery
- Alma mater: Campbell University
- Relatives: Paul LaCamera (brother in law)
- Military career
- Service: United States Army
- Service years: 1979–2018
- Rank: Major General
- Unit: U.S. Army Infantry Branch
- Commands: 1st Battalion, 6th Infantry Regiment, 1st Armored Division; 2nd Brigade Combat Team, 2nd Infantry Division; 4th Brigade Combat Team, 4th Infantry Division; 10th Mountain Division
- Conflicts: Operation Joint Guardian; Operation Essential Harvest; Operation Iraqi Freedom; Operation Enduring Freedom; Operation Freedom Sentinel
- Awards: Army Distinguished Service Medal (2); Defense Superior Service Medal (4); Legion of Merit (2); Bronze Star Medal (3)

Jeffrey L. Bannister (April 7, 1961 – May 27, 2018) was a career officer in the United States Army. A veteran of Operation Joint Guardian (1998), Operation Essential Harvest (2000–2001), Operation Iraqi Freedom, Operation Enduring Freedom, and Operation Freedom Sentinel, he attained the rank of major general and was a recipient of the Army Distinguished Service Medal (2), Defense Superior Service Medal (4), Legion of Merit (2), and Bronze Star Medal (3). Bannister was most notable for his service as commander of the 10th Mountain Division from 2015 to 2017.

Bannister was serving as a special assistant to the commander of United States Central Command and awaiting retirement when he died of a heart attack while on a run at Lake Murray near Lexington, South Carolina. He was buried at Arlington National Cemetery.

== Early life ==
Jeffrey Lynn Bannister was born in Coalinga, California on April 7, 1961, a son of L.T. Bannister of Rome, Georgia and Betty (Johnson) Bannister of Cleburne County, Alabama. Bannister attended Pepperell High School in Lindale, Georgia, then completed his General Educational Development diploma. He enlisted in the United States Army in 1979 and served for three years as a member of the 82nd Airborne Division. Bannister attended Campbell University, from which he graduated in 1984 with a bachelor's degree in business administration. While in college, he took part in the Reserve Officers' Training Corps program, which he completed as a Distinguished Honor Graduate. After graduation, Bannister received his commission as a second lieutenant of Infantry.

== Military education ==
At the start of his career, Bannister completed the Infantry Officer Basic Course. His subsequent professional development and education included the Infantry Officer Advanced Course and the Airborne, Pathfinder, and Ranger schools. He was a graduate of the United States Army Command and General Staff College, and received a master's degree in national security and strategic studies from the National War College.

== Career ==
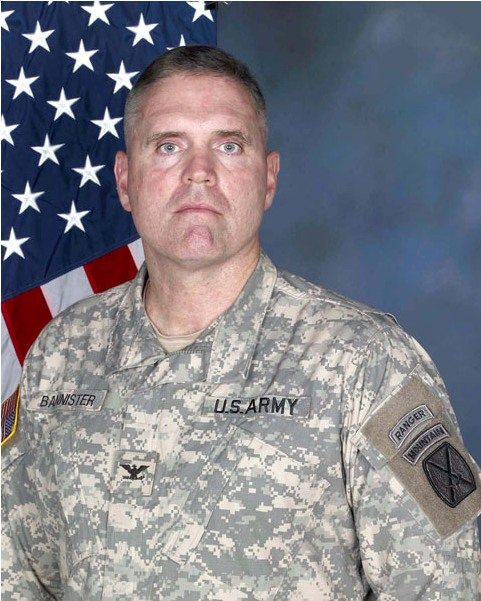
Bannister in 2009 as deputy commander of the 10th Mountain Division

Bannister's assignments included: 82nd Airborne Division; 1st Battalion 75th Ranger Regiment; and 2nd Infantry Division. He commanded at every level from company through division level, including 1st Battalion, 6th Infantry Regiment, 1st Armored Division in Germany (2000–2003). His subsequent commands included 2nd Brigade Combat Team, 2nd Infantry Division (later reflagged as 4th Brigade Combat Team, 4th Infantry Division) at Fort Carson (2005–2008). He served as deputy commander for operations at the 10th Mountain Division from 2009 to 2011, and deputy assistant chief of staff for operations (J3) at United States Central Command (2014–2015). During his career, Bannister deployed overseas on several occasions, including: Operation Joint Guardian (1998); Operation Essential Harvest (2000–2001); Operation Iraqi Freedom; Operation Enduring Freedom; and Operation Freedom Sentinel.

Bannister was commanding general of the 10th Mountain Division from 2015 to 2017. In 2018 he was assigned as a special assistant to the commander of United States Central Command as he prepared for retirement. He died of a heart attack while on a run at Lake Murray near Lexington, South Carolina. Bannister was buried at Arlington National Cemetery.

== Awards ==
Bannister received the following qualification and combat badges:

- Combat Infantryman Badge
- Expert Infantryman Badge
- Combat Action Badge
- Master Parachutist Badge
- Ranger Tab
- Pathfinder Badge

The medals Bannister received during his career included:

- Army Distinguished Service Medal with Bronze Oak leaf cluster
- Defense Superior Service Medal with 3 Bronze Oak leaf clusters
- Legion of Merit with Bronze Oak leaf cluster
- Bronze Star Medal with 2 Bronze Oak leaf clusters
- Defense Meritorious Service Medal with Bronze Oak leaf cluster
- Meritorious Service Medal with Silver Oak leaf cluster
- Joint Service Commendation Medal
- Army Commendation Medal with Silver Oak leaf cluster
- Joint Service Achievement Medal with Bronze Oak leaf cluster
- Army Achievement Medal with 2 Silver Oak leaf clusters.

== Family ==
Bannister was married to Trese LaCamera, a retired Army lieutenant colonel and the sister of General Paul LaCamera. They were the parents of a daughter, Lindsey.
