= Coalinga-Huron Joint Unified School District =

School district in California, United States

Coalinga Huron Joint Unified School District

Location
- 657 Sunset St. Coalinga, California 93210 United States

Other information
- Website: chusd.org

Coalinga Huron Joint Unified School District is a K-12 public school district based in Fresno County, California. The California Department of Education reported 4,382 enrolled students in 2024.

The district is mostly in Fresno County, where it includes Coalinga and Huron. The district extends into Monterey County and San Benito County.

== Coalinga High School ==
Coalinga High School
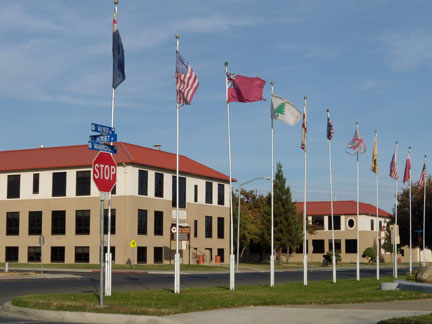

Location
- 750 Van Ness St; Coalinga, California 93210; United States
- Coordinates: 36.143849°N 120.361817°W

Information
- School type: Comprehensive Public High School
- Established: 1909
- School district: Coalinga-Huron Unified School District
- Superintendent: Lori Villanueva
- CEEB code: 050630
- NCES School ID: 060912000933
- Principal: Sheila Diaz
- Teaching staff: 59.63 (FTE)
- Grades: 9–12
- Gender: Coeducational
- Enrollment: 1,232 (2023–2024)
- Student to teacher ratio: 20.66
- Campus type: Rural
- Colors: Orange and black
- Mascot: The Horned Toad
- Accreditations: Coalinga High School received a 6-year WASC accreditation in 2013.
- Publication: CHS The Magazine
- Yearbook: Petrolia
- Feeder schools: Coalinga Middle School, Huron Middle School
- Website: School web site

Coalinga High School is a public high school in Coalinga, California. It lies southwest of Fresno, California and northeast of San Luis Obispo, California. It serves both the communities of Coalinga and Huron. It is a member of the West Sierra League Conference. Its mascot is the Horned Toad.

=== Enrollment ===
Coalinga High School has had an enrollment of about 1,158 students in 2017-2018 school year. Coalinga High School is very integrated in the school years of 2011-2012 with, 0.1% American Indian/Alaska Native 0.2% Native Hawaiian/Pacific Islander, 2.2% Asian, 79.9% Hispanic, 1.4% Black, and 16.0% White.

=== Athletics ===
Currently, Coalinga High School offers its students 12 sports teams: baseball, softball, basketball, swimming, football, wrestling, volleyball, track and field, soccer, cross country, tennis, and cheerleading.

== Middle Schools ==
- Coalinga Middle School
- Huron Middle School

== Elementary Schools ==
- Cheney-Bishop Elementary Schools
- Dawson Elementary
- Sunset Elementary
- Huron Elementary
