= Jacalitos Hills =

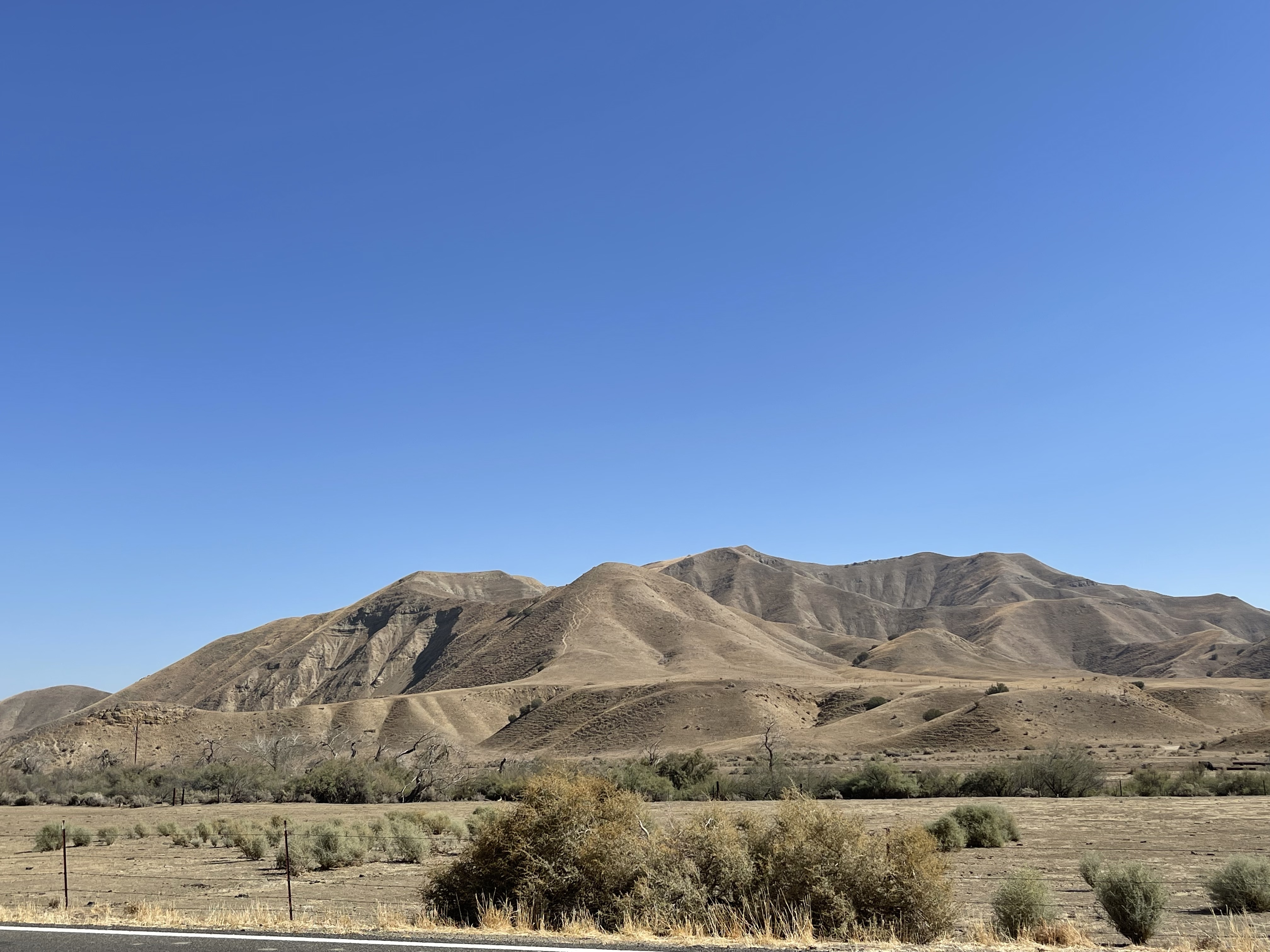
- Jacalitos Hills as seen from California State Route 198.

Highest point
- Elevation: 576 m (1,890 ft)

Geography
- Location within California
- Country: United States
- State: California
- District: Fresno County
- Range coordinates: 36°5′29.847″N 120°23′57.545″W
- Topo map: USGS Curry Mountain
- Biome: California interior chaparral and woodlands

Geology
- Rock type: California Coast Ranges

The Jacalitos Hills are a low mountain range in western Fresno County, central California. They are located south of Coalinga, California.

They are in the Southern Inner California Coast Ranges. Habitats of the hills are in the California interior chaparral and woodlands sub-ecoregion.

Jacalitos is derived from a Spanish word meaning "little wigwams".
