= Coalinga Oil Field =

Oil field in Fresno County, California, United States

Coordinates: 36.2115°N 120.3578°W

The Coalinga Oil Field is a large oil field in western Fresno County, California, in the United States. It surrounds the town of Coalinga, about halfway between Los Angeles and San Francisco, to the west of Interstate 5, at the foot of the Diablo Range. Discovered in the late 19th century, it became active around 1890, and is now the eighth-largest oil field in California, with reserves totaling approximately 58 million barrels (9,200,000 m^{3}), over 1,600 active oil wells, and having a cumulative production of 1,014 million barrels (161,200,000 m^{3}). It is one of California's six billion barrel fields, the others being Midway-Sunset Oil Field, Wilmington Oil Field, Kern River Oil Field, South Belridge Oil Field, and Elk Hills Oil Field. The principal operators on the field, as of 2008, were Chevron Corp. (formerly Standard Oil of California or SoCal) and Aera Energy LLC.

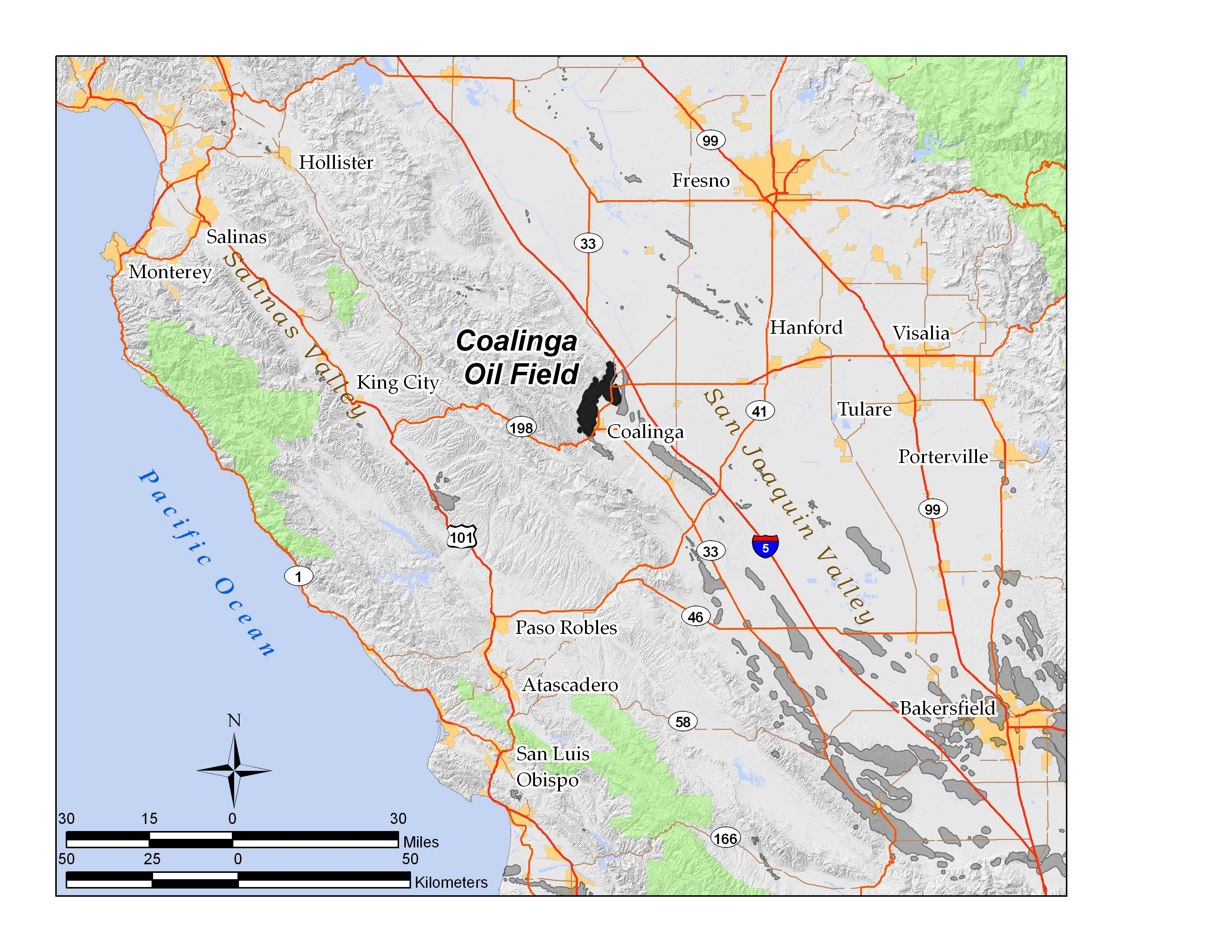
The Coalinga Oil Field in Central California. Other oil fields are shown in gray.

== Setting ==
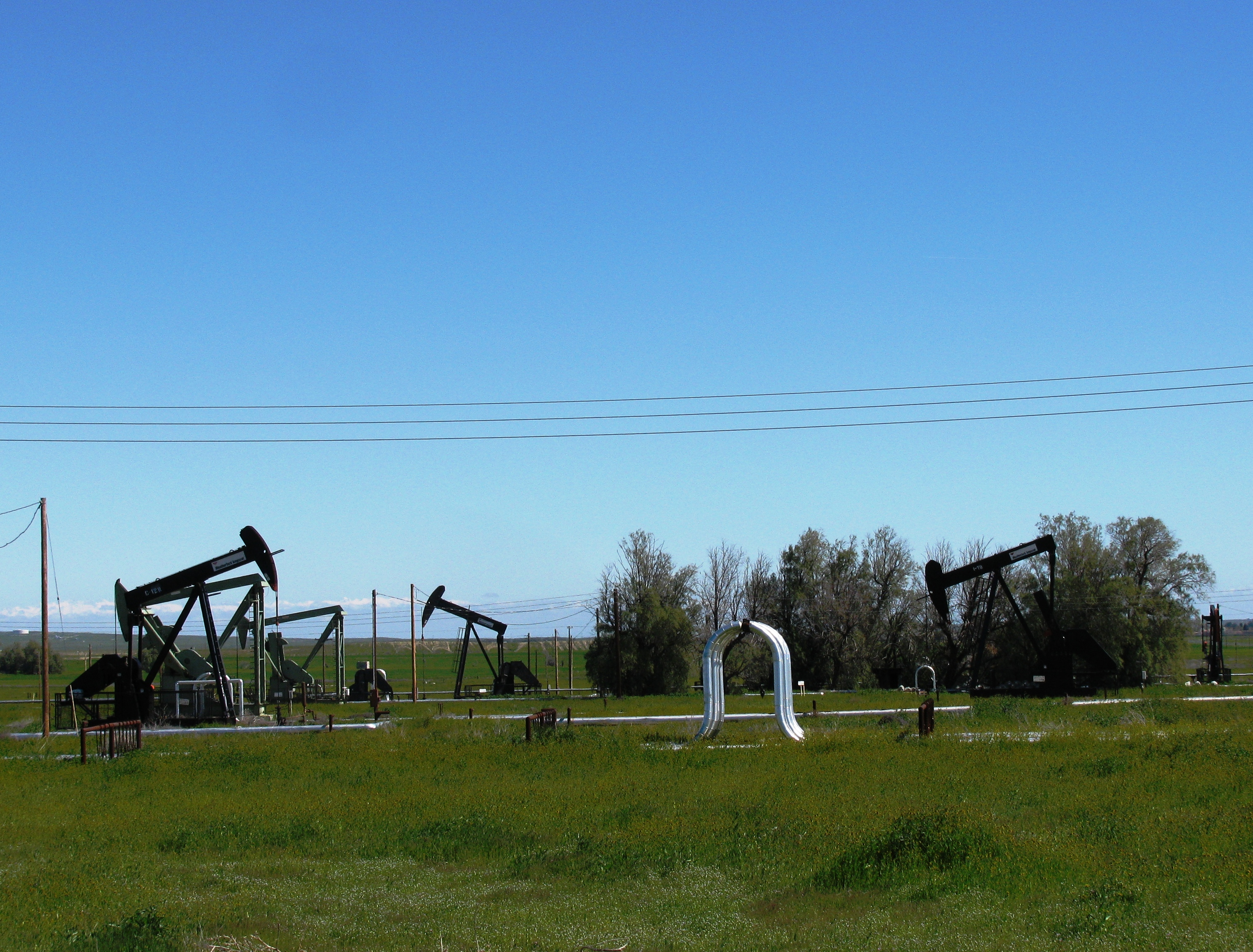
Oil wells and steam apparatus along Derrick Road in the western portion of the Coalinga field. The vertical loops are steam pipes; steam is pumped into the underground heavy oil deposits to help them flow more freely.

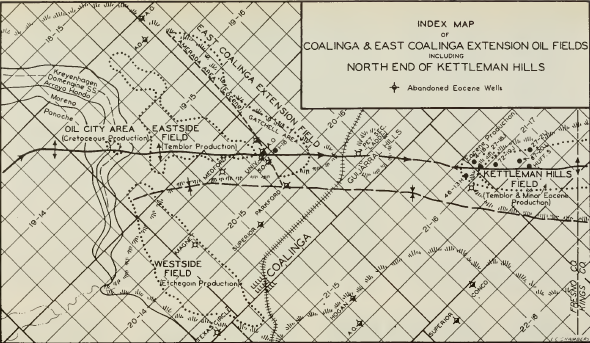
Coalinga Oil Field Map

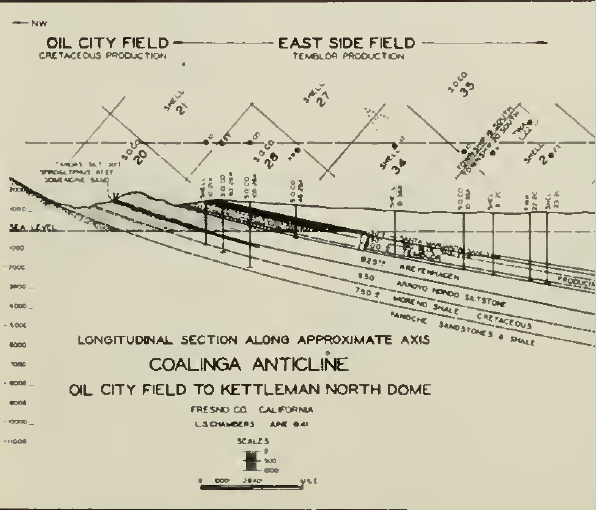
Coalinga Anticline Geologic Cross Section

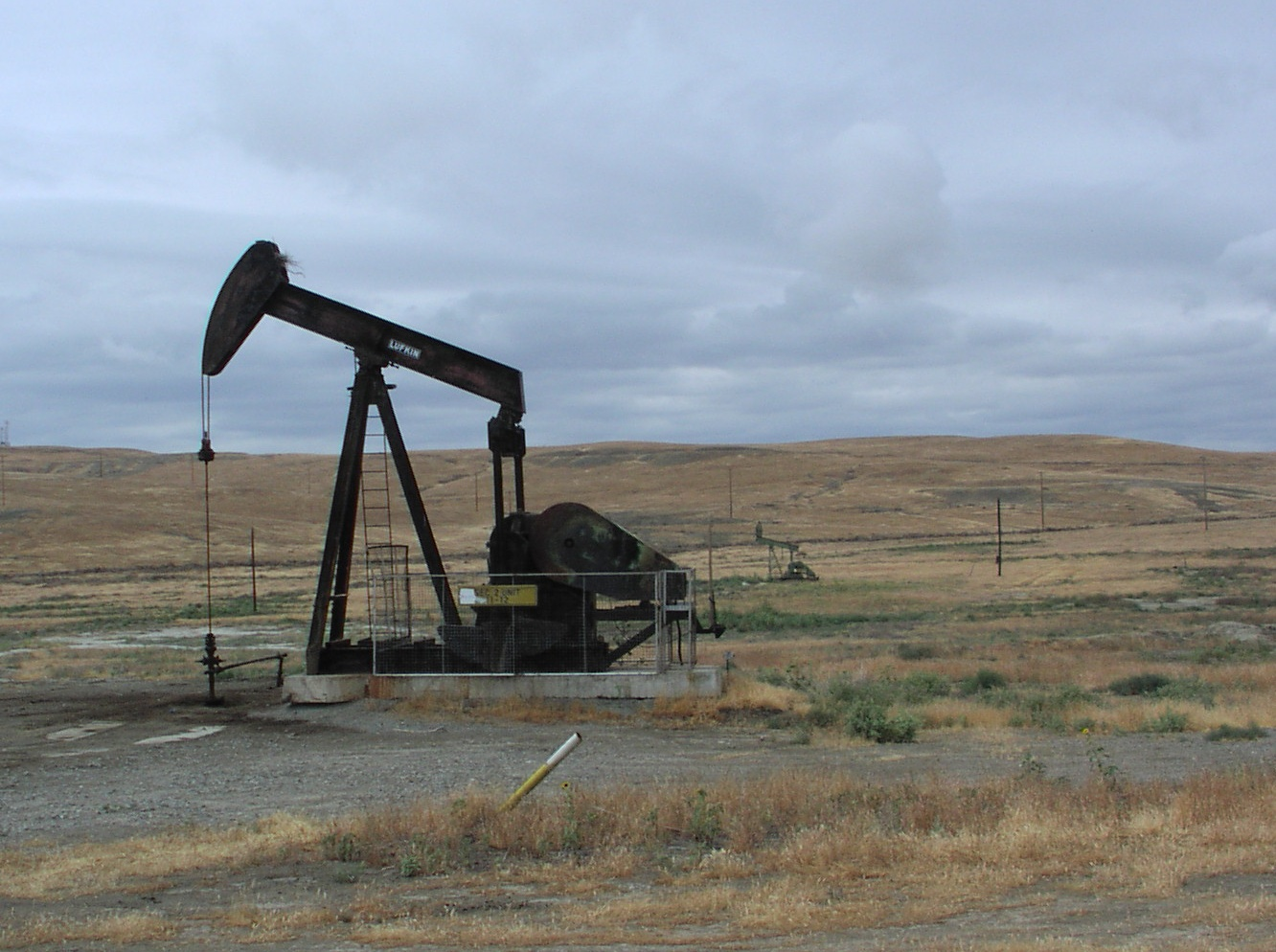
An idle oil well along Palmer Road, on Anticline Ridge in the eastern portion of Coalinga Oil Field.

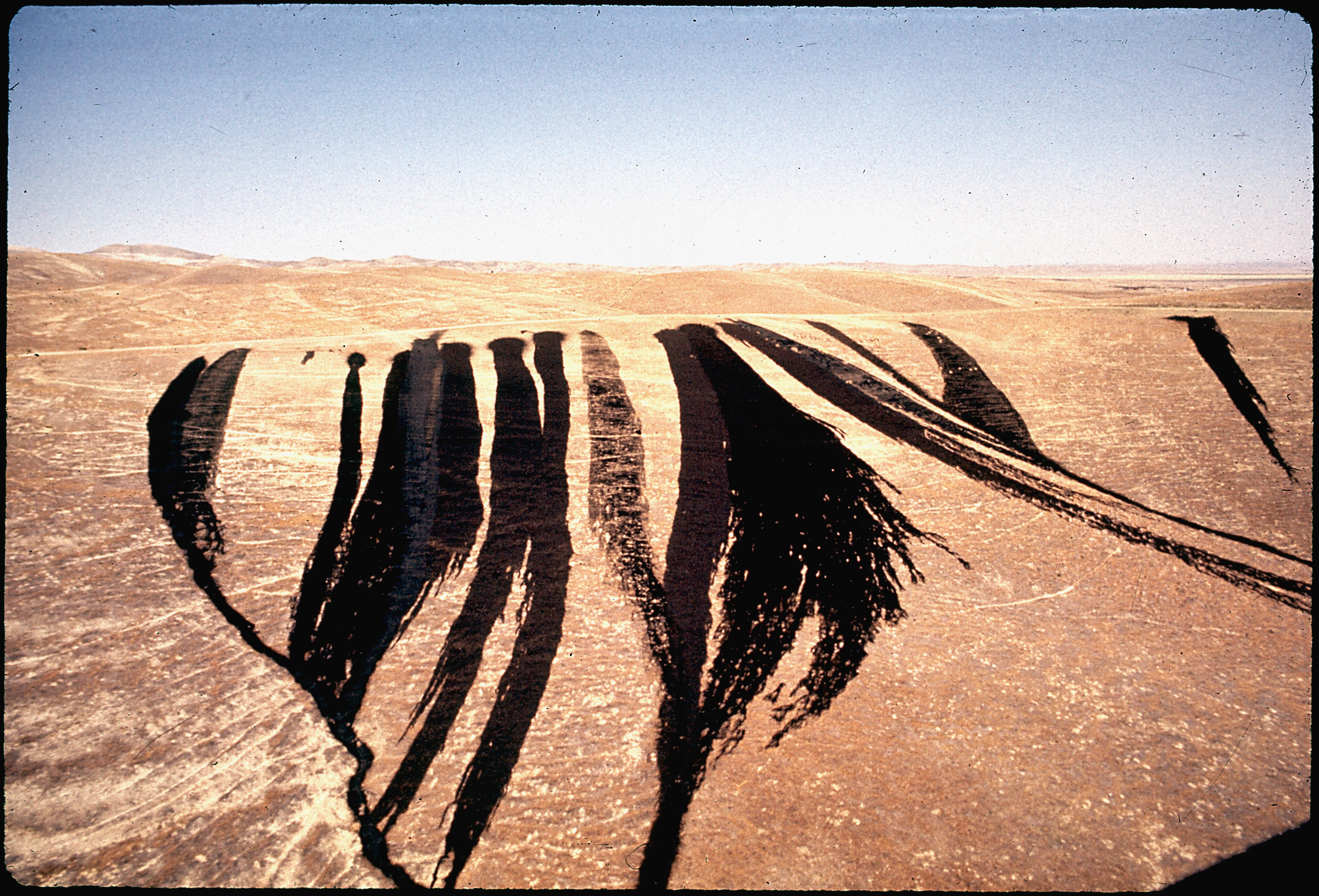
Oil waste on barren hillside, Coalinga, Environmental Protection Agency, May 1972

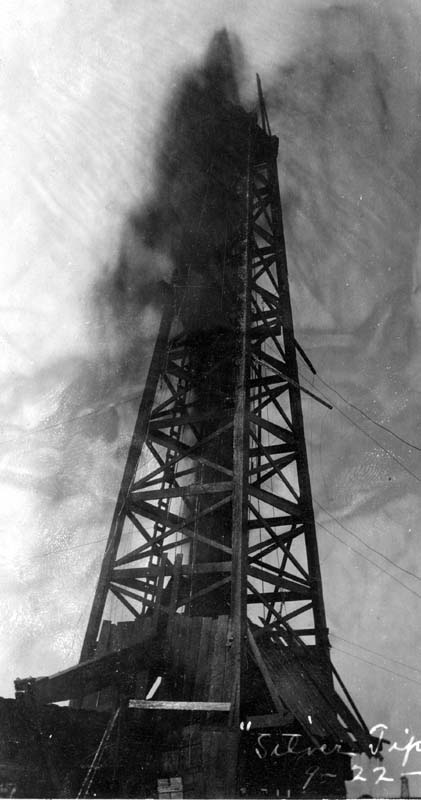
Coalinga "gusher" at the Silver Tip well, 1909

Standard Oil Company building, Coalinga Oil Field, ca. 1930. Standard Oil of California (now Chevron) remains a major operator at the Coalinga Field.

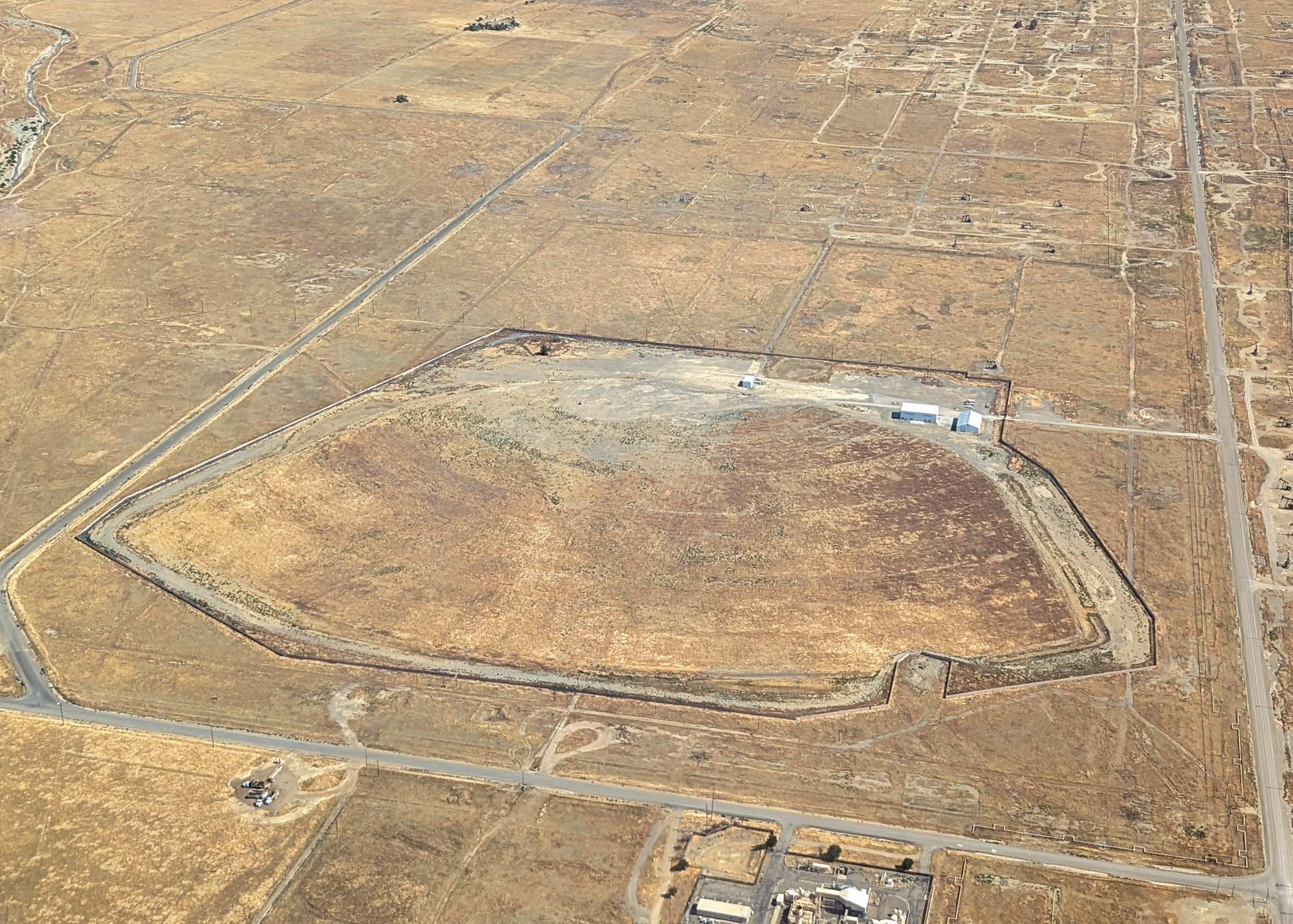
The former BrightSource Energy solar plant, part of the Coalinga enhanced recovery

Compared to many of the other California oil fields, Coalinga is large and spread out, but contains a few areas of concentrated development around the richer pools. The field has a rough semicircular shape open to the southeast, approximately twelve miles long by six across, with the town of Coalinga at the southwestern limit of the semicircle, and the agricultural Pleasant Valley inside. The oil field is mainly on the high ground around the valley, with the western part of the semicircle at the base of the Alcalde Hills, and the eastern part on the long and low Anticline Ridge, which separates Pleasant Valley and Coalinga from Interstate 5 and the main part of the San Joaquin Valley. The anticline in Anticline ridge continues to the southeast as the Guijarral Hills Oil Field and the Kettleman North Dome Oil Field. California State routes 33 and 198, which join together for the stretch through and north of Coalinga, cut across the Coalinga field and cross Anticline Ridge; along the route a passing traveler has a good view of oil field operations.

As the climate in the region is semiarid to arid, most of the native vegetation is grassland and low scrub. Areas of particularly dense oil development are almost entirely denuded of vegetation.

== Geology and operations ==
The Coalinga Oil Field is the northernmost of a series of oil fields along anticlines extending along the western margin of the San Joaquin Valley, anticlines which parallel the San Andreas fault and have their origin in compression from associated tectonic processes. Other anticlinal oil fields in the same series include the Lost Hills, South Belridge, Kettleman Hills, and Cymric fields. The southernmost, and largest in the series, is the Midway-Sunset Field in the southwestern corner of the valley.

The eastern part of the Coalinga field is a southeast-plunging anticline. Most of the oil in the Coalinga field comes from a large-scale geologic formation known as the Kregenhagan-Temblor petroleum system, a body of Eocene-age shales rich in organic sediments. Oil in the field is found in both structural traps such as anticlinal folds, in which oil migrates upwards and is trapped beneath an impermeable layer, and stratigraphic traps, where oil is trapped within a rock unit due to changes within the rock itself.

Drillers have found a total of four oil pools in the Coalinga field. The first to be discovered was the "Oil City" pool of Cretaceous age, discovered in 1887 or 1888; however, it had little yield. On the east side of the field, along Anticline Ridge, the huge Temblor pool of Miocene age, at depths of 700 to 4,600 feet (1,400 m), produced an enormous amount of oil in the early 20th century, and is now mostly exhausted. The other large pool is the Etchegoin-Temblor on the west side, of Pliocene-Miocene age, and at depths of 500 to 3,500 feet (1,100 m); this area is currently active and subject to enhanced recovery methods such as steam flooding, fire flooding, and water flooding, methods developed in recent decades in order to extract previously submarginal deposits.

The Coalinga Oil Field is a mature field, and closer to exhaustion than most of the other major fields in California. Its remaining reserves, at around 58,000,000 barrels (9,200,000 m^{3}), are less than 6 percent of its total original capacity; over 1,000 million barrels (160,000,000 m^{3}) of oil have been pumped from the field since the late 19th century. In the San Joaquin Valley, only the Buena Vista Oil Field and Kettleman North Dome Oil Field are closer to exhaustion, with about one percent and one-half of one percent of their original oil remaining, respectively.

Oil from the Etchegoin-Temblor pool on the westside is heavy crude, with a specific gravity of 11-18 API, and a relatively low sulfur content of 0.75%; oil from the Temblor pools on the Eastside is more variable, ranging from heavy to medium crude, having an API index of 12 to 30. Aera Energy, LLC sends its oil from the Coalinga field to its refinery in Martinez for processing.

== History ==
Oil was known in the Coalinga area long before the arrival of Europeans, as the Native Americans in the region used the tarry substance from natural seeps as lining for baskets, as well as for trade. The first attempt to drill for oil was in 1867, but success was limited both due to the difficulty of transporting oil at the time, and the relative disinterest in petroleum prior to the era of motorized transport.

In 1890 the first oil boom began, once the Southern Pacific had extended its rail line into the town of Coalinga. Around the "Oil City" area of the Coalinga Field, directly north of the modern-day town of Coalinga, several large gushers attracted attention, gushers still being a relatively new occurrence in the oil industry. The "Blue Goose" well, drilled by the Home Oil Company to a depth 1,400 feet (430 m), erupted in 1898, spewing over 1,000 barrels per day (160 m^{3}/d).

The huge and productive Temblor oil pools were discovered around 1900, and by 1910 the field was the most richly productive oil field in California, exceeding those in the Los Angeles Basin for the first time.

A dramatic oil gusher erupted in Sept. 1909 at the "Silver Tip" well, producing 20,000 barrels a day, the biggest gusher in California until then. This was an event of such excitement that Los Angeles Stock Exchange closed down for a day so that its members could come by train to view it. This gusher would be dwarfed a year later by the colossal Lakeview Gusher, by which California's largest oil field, the Midway-Sunset in Kern County, was first known.

In the early years of the field, competition was fierce between different oil companies, with a particularly sharp conflict between a group of independent oil producers and Standard Oil, which operated as a gigantic trust until its breakup by the U.S. Supreme Court in 1911. According to an article published in the New York Times in 1905, Standard attempted to force its competitors out of business by artificially holding down the price of oil to as little as ten cents a barrel. The Coalinga independents responded by building a pipeline to San Francisco Bay, the construction of which was itself obstructed by continuous harassment from Standard, until the independents were finally successful by ruse: secretly building a real pipeline, while simultaneously seeming to work on a "dummy" pipeline in a more prominent location. During this time, the independent operators also accused the Southern Pacific Railroad of working in conjunction with Standard to put them out of business.

The operators of the Coalinga field attained peak production in 1912 – 19,500,000 barrels (3,100,000 m^{3}) of oil – a value which was to decline steadily for the next several decades. Royal Dutch-Shell acquired William Miller Graham's California Oilfields Limited in 1913.

During the 1960s and 1970s, enhanced recovery technologies such as water flooding, steam flooding, fire flooding, and polymer flooding were employed to increase the declining productivity of the field, and to reach and recover previously submarginal deposits. Even with such methods, the current oil output of the field has declined considerably from the early part of the 20th century: in 2006, the field's operators reported 5,700,000 barrels (910,000 m^{3}) of oil pumped.
