= Guijarral Hills Oil Field =

Formerly-productive oil and gas field near Coalinga, California, United States

Coordinates: 36.1528°N 120.2118°W

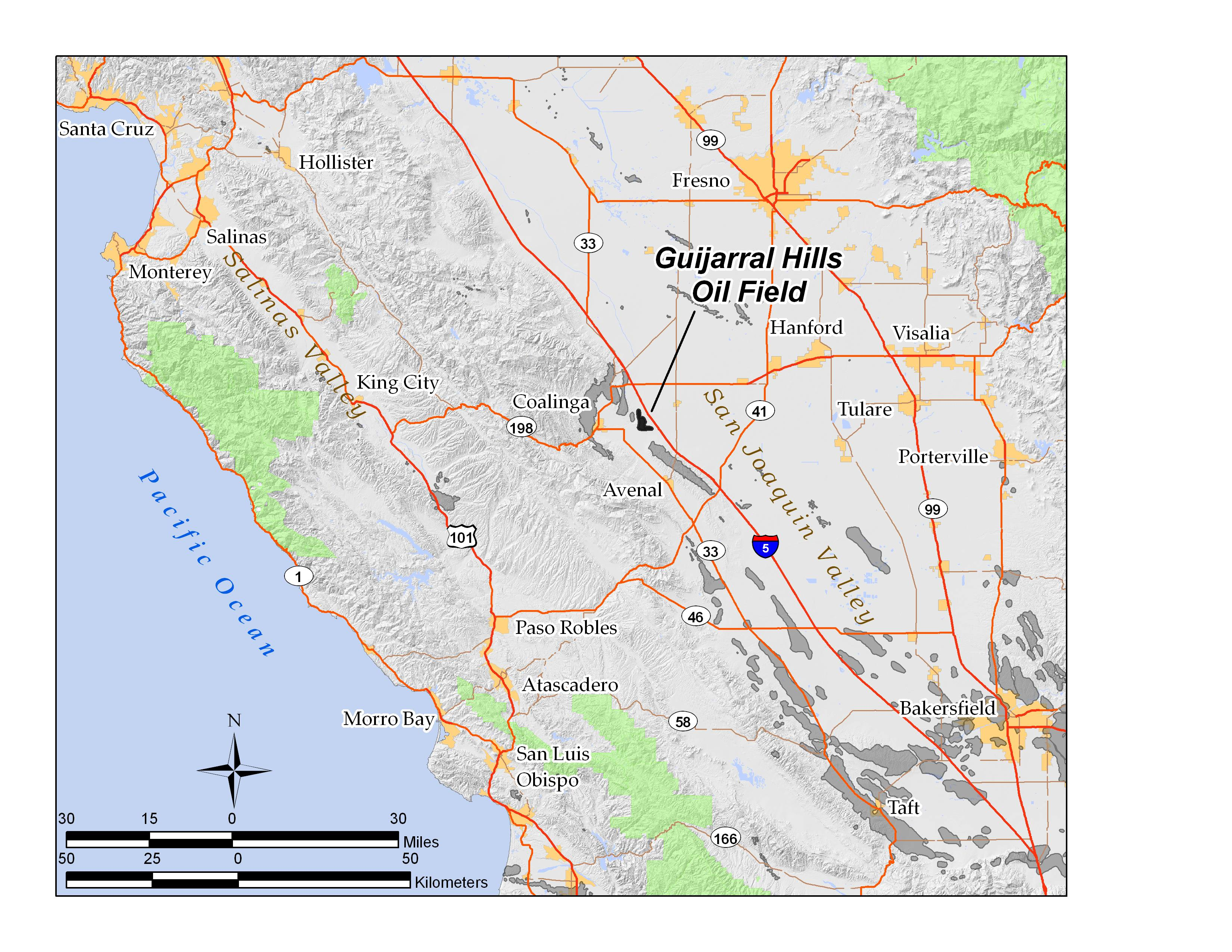
- The Guijarral Hills Oil Field in central California. Other oil fields are shown in dark gray.
- Country: United States
- Region: San Joaquin Basin
- Location: Fresno County, California
- Offshore/onshore: onshore
- Operator: Longview Natural Resources

Field history
- Discovery: 1948
- Start of development: 1948
- Start of production: 1948
- Peak year: 1950

Production
- Current production of oil: 1.4 barrels per day (~70 t/a)
- Estimated oil in place: 0.037 million barrels (~5,000 t)
- Producing formations: Temblor Formation (Miocene), Lodo Formation (Eocene)

The Guijarral Hills Oil Field is a formerly-productive oil and gas field near Coalinga on the western side of the Central Valley in central California in the United States. Discovered in 1948, and having produced 5.4 million barrels (860,000 m^{3}) of oil during its peak year in 1950, it now has only one active oil well producing a little over a barrel of oil a day, and is very near to exhaustion. Only 343,000 recoverable barrels of oil remain throughout its 2,515-acre (10.18 km^{2}) area, according to the official California State Department of Conservation estimate. As of 2010, the only active operator was Longview Production Company.

== Setting ==
The Guijarral Hills are a low range of hills, rising a little more than a hundred feet above the floor of the San Joaquin Valley to the east, and scarcely noticeable in the shadow of the nearby Coast Range of central California. These low hills are the surface expression of the southern portion of the Coalinga Anticline, which separates the smaller, largely agricultural Pleasant Valley to the west from the main portion of the California Central Valley to the east. The town of Coalinga is about eight miles (13 km) west of the hills, with the large Coalinga Oil Field wrapping around the town in a crescent shape. The Guijarral field is a similar, smaller, and separate field southeast of the giant Coalinga field.

The major road through the field is Jayne Avenue, which runs east to west, connecting Interstate 5 to Coalinga. California State Route 33 runs from north to south, west of the field, joining with Jayne Avenue. The Pleasant Valley State Prison, also on Jayne Avenue, is adjacent to the oil field on the west.

Climate in the area is arid to semi-arid, and native vegetation consists of grassland and low scrub. Summertime temperatures routinely exceed 100 °F (38 °C), and freezes occur during the coldest months, although snow is rare. Most precipitation occurs in the winter. Runoff to the west and north is into Los Gatos Creek, which flows northeast into the San Joaquin Valley; runoff to the south and east is into Zapato Chino Creek, which joins with Los Gatos Creek draining to the northeast. Elevations in the vicinity range from around 500 feet (150 m) in Los Gatos Creek north of the hills to 733 feet (223 m) at the highest point in the hills; the productive portion of the oil field ranges from around 550 to 650 feet (200 m) above sea level.

== Geology ==
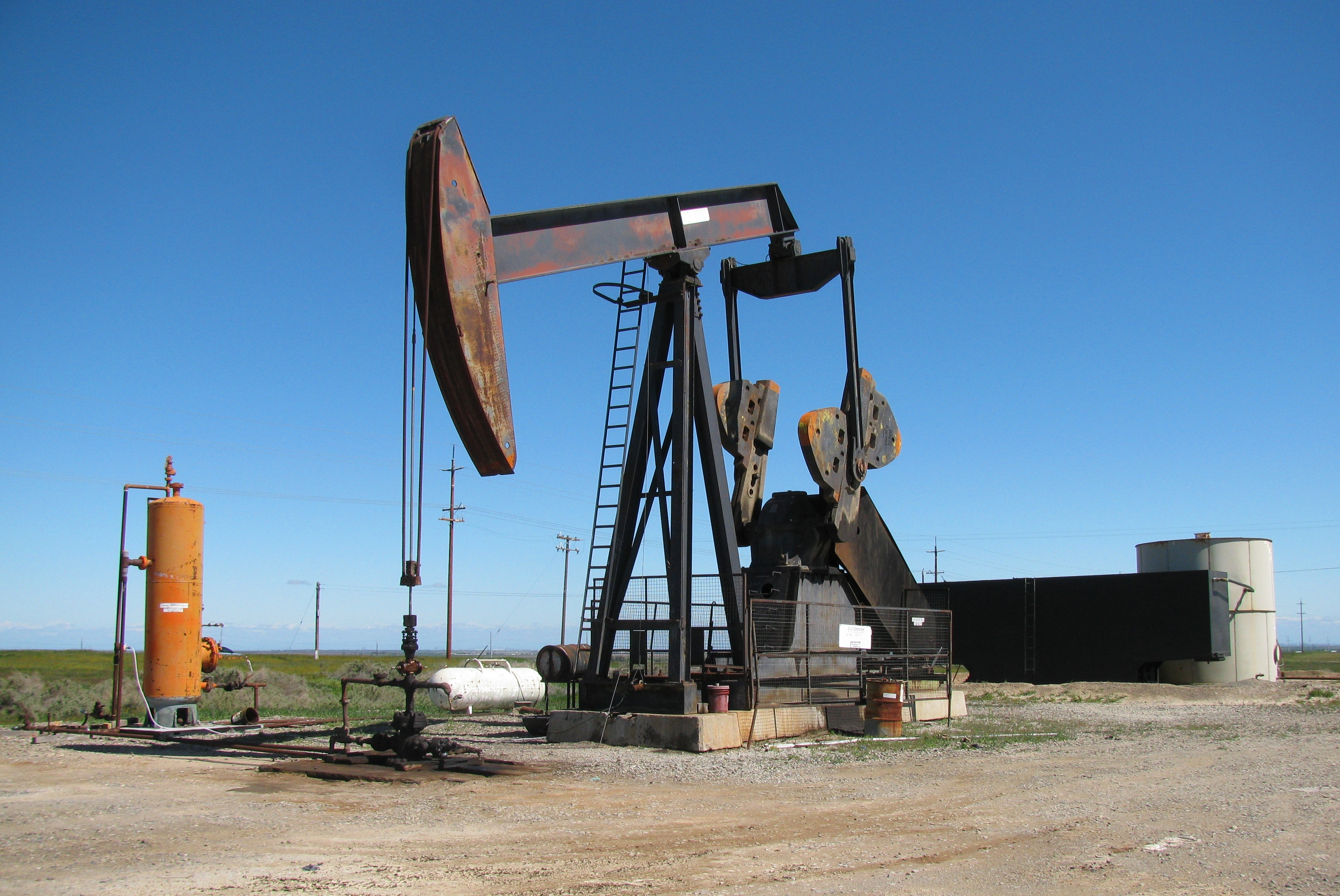
Oil well with pumpjack, oil-water separator, and storage tanks on the Guijarral Hills field

The field, like many in and adjacent to the California Central Valley, is an anticlinal structure, in which oil has accumulated through both structural and stratigraphic mechanisms. The Guijarral Hills are a segment of a long anticline which includes the Kettleman Hills to the southeast, and which continues to the northwest as the large eastern extension of the Coalinga Oil Field (named there the Coalinga Anticline, and Anticline Ridge on United States Geological Survey maps). The uppermost productive units in the field are sand lenses within the Miocene-age Temblor Formation, named the Smith and Allison respectively from upper to lower. The most productive unit, and the first to be discovered, is the Leda Sands, which reside in the Miocene-age Vaqueros Formation, underlying the Temblor. The impermeable Salt Creek member of the same Vaqueros Formation is above the Leda Sands, trapping the oil and preventing its natural upward movement.

Other oil pools were found later, including the Gatchell, Dessell, McAdams, Sanger, Bourdieu, and Smith, with the most recent discovery being the Dessell pool in 1962. These pools are accumulations of oil in permeable sand lenses within less permeable lithologic units. Oil quality varies throughout the field but is always medium to light, with API gravity between 27 and 38. Sulfur content is generally low, with no pool over 0.63 percent by weight. In 2008 the remaining active well reported a water cut of 96%, a high value typically indicating a field near the end of its useful life (once that much of the fluid pumped from the reservoir is water, the cost to extract oil exceeds the revenue generated by selling it).

== History, production, and operations ==
The Guijarral field was discovered relatively late (1948) because of the depth and relative inaccessibility of the oil-producing formations. While the enormous Coalinga field is but a few miles away, in a similar anticlinal structure, it is richly productive at under 1,000 feet (300 m) below ground surface, and hence was easier to exploit. Drillers attempted to find oil at the Guijarral Hills in the 1920s, but the maximum depth of their boreholes was only a little over 4,000 feet (1,200 m), and while these boreholes were in good locations had they been drilled sufficiently deep, they were abandoned. The discovery well was put in by Barnsdall Oil Company in 1948 to a depth of 8,730 feet (2,660 m) and flowed over 800 barrels per day (130 m^{3}/d); by the end of 1948, seven more wells had been drilled to follow on this success.

Development of the field was fast, with 55 new wells drilled in 1949, and another 20 in 1950. The field reached peak production in 1950 with over 5.4 million barrels (860,000 m^{3}) of oil pumped that year. As the Leda Sands had proven to be spectacularly productive, operators began searching for other rich petroleum deposits, and in 1949 found the second-most productive unit, the Allison Sand; in 1954, the rich North Leda unit; in 1957, the Gatchell pool, and in 1962 the Dessel pool. The discontiguous Polvadero pool was discovered in 1953 by Superior Oil Company, and reached its peak production in 1956. Production in all areas and units gradually declined after the early peak, in a typical production curve for an oil field.

Many companies have operated on the field in its 60-year history, with Union Oil, now Chevron Corporation, being one of the largest players. As of 2010, the only active operator remaining on the field was Longview Production Company, who retained one periodically active well. (Fields with no active wells must be formally abandoned in short order; it is often in an operator's interest to keep at least one well operating if there is any potential either for redevelopment or sale.) In early 2010, the Australian firm Solimar Energy acquired a portion of the field with intent to redevelop, believing that the field contained considerable untapped reserves; they stated they intended to have the first new well operating by mid-2010.
