= New Coalinga Municipal Airport =

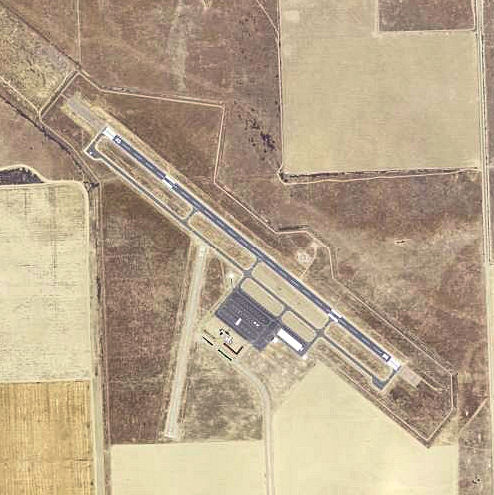
- 2006 USGS photo
- IATA: CLG; ICAO: none; FAA LID: C80

Summary
- Airport type: Public
- Owner: City of Coalinga
- Location: Coalinga, California
- Elevation AMSL: 622 ft / 190 m
- Coordinates: 36°09′47″N 120°17′38″W

Map

Runways
Direction	Length		Surface
Direction	ft	m	Surface
1/19	2,500	762	Asphalt/gravel
12/30	5,000	1,524	Asphalt

Helipads
Number	Length		Surface
Number	ft	m	Surface
H1	50	15	Asphalt

Statistics (2003)
- Aircraft operations: 2,400
- Source: Federal Aviation Administration

New Coalinga Municipal Airport (IATA: CLG, FAA LID: C80) is three miles east of Coalinga, in Fresno County, California, United States. It is owned by the city of Coalinga.

The original Coalinga Municipal Airport was about 0.5 mile (1 km) north of the town center, just north of Cambridge Avenue and west of East Elm Avenue. It opened sometime in the 1920s. As of 2024 traces of it could still be seen on aerial photographs and satellite images. The New Coalinga Municipal Airport was built in the late 1990s east of the town center, with an entrance road from West Phelps Avenue.

== Facilities ==
The airport covers 1,002 acres (405 ha) and has two runways (1/19: 2,500 x 60 ft (18 m), 12/30: 5,000 x 100 ft) and one helipad (H1: 50 x 50 ft).

In the year ending May 9, 2003 the airport had 2,400 aircraft operations, all general aviation.
