= Lemoore Army Airfield =

Former military base in Kings County, California

Lemoore Army Airfield
- Part of Army Air Force Training Command
- Kings County, near Lemoore, California
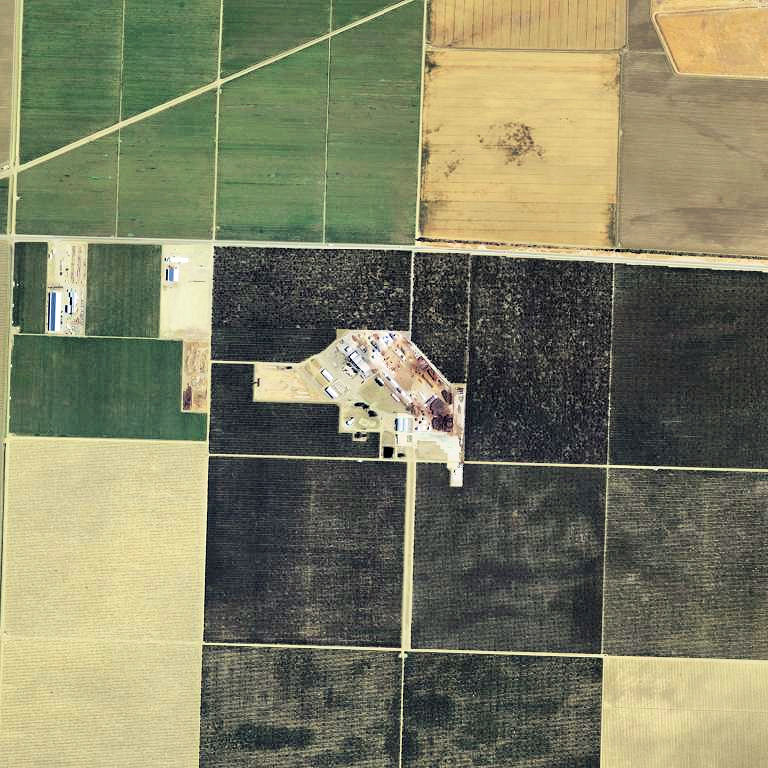
- Remains of Lemoore AAF, 2006 USGS Airphoto

Site information
- Type: Army Airfield
- Controlled by: United States Army Air Forces

Location
- Coordinates: 36°15′03″N 119°56′51″W

Site history
- Built: 1941–42
- In use: 1942–1945

Garrison information
- Garrison: Army Air Force Training Command

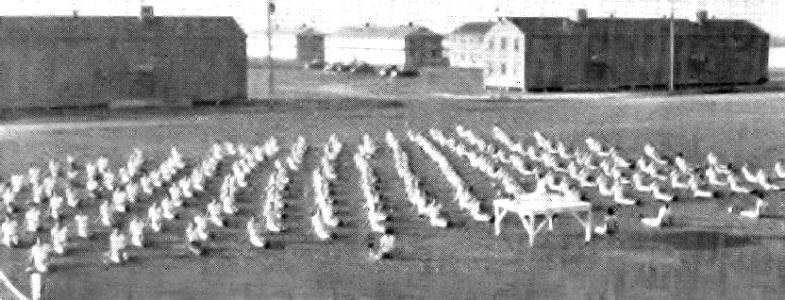
Army Air Corps Cadetes, Leemoore Army Airfield, 1944

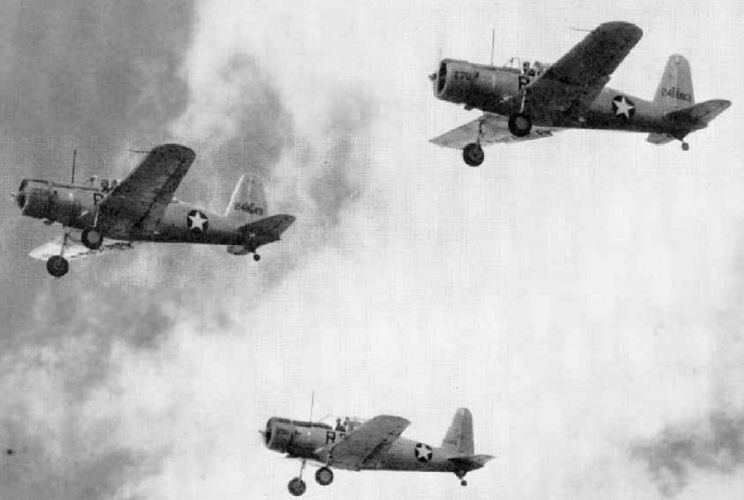
Formation flight of Vultee BT-13 Aircraft from Lemoore AAF

Lemoore Army Air Field, located nine miles (14 km) southwest of Lemoore, California, was a dirt air field usable only in dry weather. It nevertheless was used by the AAF Western Flying Training Command as a processing and training field.

The site of Lemoore AAF is located south of the intersection of Route 198 & 27th Avenue, two miles (3.2 km) west of the main gate of Lemoore NAS.

== History ==
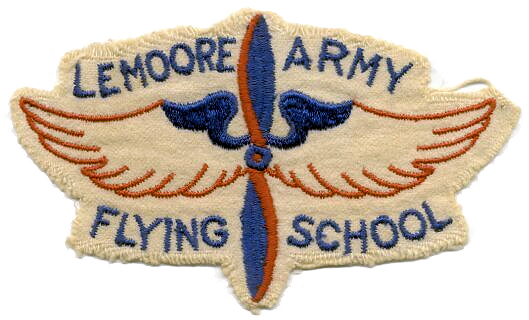
Patch from Lemoore AAF Flying School

This base was built during World War II as an Army Air Forces training field. The Federal Government acquired 1,466 acres (5.93 km^{2}) for the Lemoore Basic Flying School in 1941–42. Approximately 488 acres (1.97 km^{2}) were acquired in fee by grant deed from individual land owners, 963 acres (3.90 km^{2}) were leased from the City of Lemoore and 14 acres (57,000 m^{2}) were acquired by transfer from the National Housing Agency.

According to a World War II-era diagram, the field consisted of a roughly triangular shaped landing mat, which measured 3,470' along its longest side. A 3,700' long north–south apron sat to the southwest of the landing mat, and west of the apron was the building area. In addition, the airfield had a PX gas station, 10 gas tanks, a truck fill station, oil & lube station, motor repair shop with 4 grease racks & 4 underground tanks, fire station, cadet quarters, warehouses, officers quarters, mess hall, utilities shop, chapel, classrooms, water reservoir & water well, taxiways, runway, landing field, and two hangars.

Additional structures constructed by the Army for the Lemoore site were located south of the area shown on the 1941 & 1942 site maps, including an amphitheater & swimming pool.

Lemoore AAF was described by the 1944 US Army/Navy Directory of Airfields as having a 6,500' hard-surface runway, although the remarks included, "Entire field available only when dry."

Known sub-bases and auxiliaries were:

- Boston Field (A-1) 36°13′12″N 119°59′20″W (abandoned, now farmland)
- Huron Field (A-2) 36°13′21″N 120°02′22″W (abandoned, now farmland)
- Indian Field (A-3) 36°07′53″N 120°05′06″W (abandoned, now farmland)
- Murray Field (A-4) 36°08′41″N 119°56′00″W (abandoned, now farmland)
- West Field (A-5) 36°15′45″N 120°12′06″W (abandoned, now farmland)
- Summit Lake Field (A-6) 36°20′22″N 119°56′49″W (Now NAS Lemoore)
- Helm Field (A-7) 36°21′00″N 120°10′03″W (abandoned, now farmland)
- Corcoran Municipal Airport 36°06′08″N 119°35′40″W
- Porterville Army Airfield 36°01′46″N 119°03′43″W (Now Portersville Municipal Airport)
- Coalinga Municipal Airport (Old) 36°09′27″N 120°21′35″W (Closed)

On 5 March 1944, the Jack Benny Radio Program broadcast live at the base. Jack Benny, Don Wilson (announcer), Dennis Day, Mary Livingstone, Phil Harris, and Eddie "Rochester" Anderson were the cast. Day sang A Lovely Way to Spend an Evening and The Way You Look Tonight.

== Postwar use ==
On 25 September 1945, Major General Willis H. Hale, Fourth Air Force, notified Lemoore Army Air Field that it was temporarily inactivated.

The Lemoore AAF site was declared surplus by the War Assets Administration on 11 January 1946, and was evidently reused as a civilian airfield, as that is how it was depicted on the 1953 San Diego – San Francisco Flight Chart. Apparently the airfield had also been significant expanded at some time after World War II as the 1953 chart depicted the field as having a 6,100' runway.

According to 1 February 1957 issue of the Fresno Bee, the 1,460-acre (5.9 km^{2}) site of the former Army Airfield was sold by the City of Lemoore in 1957 to the Navy, to be used as part of the site for the new Lemoore Naval Air Station. The present-day Lemoore Naval Air Station is just a few miles to the north of the former Lemoore AAF. Ironically, the northern end of the runways of the huge Lemoore NAS sit on the same ground previously occupied by Lemoore AAF's satellite field A-6 Summit Lake.

In the 1950s the Air Force considered placing a long range radar station on the site of Lemoore AAF. Although planned to operate under the Air Defense Command. this site, known a P-74A, was never built. The Lemoore airfield had evidently been abandoned at some point between 1957 and 1959, as nothing at all was depicted at the site on the March 1959 Mt. Whitney Sectional Chart.

The 1963 World Aeronautical Chart depicted the "Abandoned Lemoore" airfield as having a single northwest–southeast runway. It also showed that a "Navy Lemoore" radio beacon had been added on the north side of the Lemoore AAF site, and the much larger runways of the newly constructed NAS Lemoore were also depicted to the north.

Ironically, the northern end of the runways of the huge Lemoore NAS were constructed on the same ground previously occupied by Lemoore AAF's satellite field A-6 Summit Lake. At some point between 1963 and 1964, the former Lemoore AAF was evidently reused as a short-lived private civilian airfield, as the June 1964 Mt. Whitney Sectional Chart depicted a "Willett" private airfield at the site.

The private airfield evidently used a subset of the former military runways (or possibly a portion of the former paved ramp area), as the Aerodromes table on the chart described Willett as having two concrete runways with the longest being only 3,200' (roughly half the length listed on the 1957 chart).

The Willett airfield evidently lasted no more than 3 years, as no airfield was depicted at the site on the June 1966 Mt. Whitney Sectional Chart or the 1967 Mt. Whitney Sectional Chart. In the early 1970s the western portion of the former airfield site was leased by McCarthy Land Company which used the facility for the manufacture of farming supplies and utilized some of the former airfield structures for an agricultural chemical laboratory.

Dianne Avila acquired the western 964 acres (3.90 km^{2}) of the former site in 1973, which included all of the former airfield facilities Information available from the County of Kings Department of Public Health Division of Environmental Health Services indicates that the airfield was operated as a crop dusting airstrip for a number of years by intervening owners, and approximately in 1975 the runway was removed & the area developed for agriculture purposes.

The eastern 464 acres (1.88 km^{2}) of the former Lemoore site was acquired in 1980 by the Leonard Oliveira Farming Company. As of a 1989 Army Corps of Engineers report, the former Lemoore AAF site was owned by two private individuals. Dianne Avila owned the western portions of the former airfield site that included the aircraft maintenance buildings, hangars, and parking areas. She used her property as an orchard.

The Leonard Oliveira Farming Company (also known as the Double 0 Ranch) owned the eastern portion of the former airfield site which previously contained the taxiways, runways and parking area for the airplanes. That property was also used to raise crops.

The report described the remaining structures on the site as 2 hangars, 3 warehouses and Z barracks-type buildings, which were described as appearing to be structurally sound. Two other buildings appeared to be less well-maintained. One of the two buildings appeared to be abandoned with windows broken & no doors in the doorways. A Google satellite view of the site dated 2022 shows the words "Navy Fuck'N Rocks!" painted in the U.S. Navy's blue and gold colors on the roof of the smaller of the two remaining hangars near the southern edge of the property.

== Known Units Assigned to Lemoore AAF ==
- Hq, Air Corps Basic Flying School
  - 527th School Squadron
  - 528th School Squadron
  - 529th School Squadron
  - 530th School Squadron
  - 531st School Squadron
  - 532nd School Squadron
- Hq and Hq Sq, 87th Air Base Group (Special):
- 302nd Material Squadron (Special)
- 88th Air Base Squadron (Special)
- Air Force Band
- Sub Depot
- Det, 1st Communications Squadron
- Det, 1st Weather Squadron
- Det, 853rd Ordnance Service Company (Aviation)
- Co M (less Det), 32nd Quartermaster Regiment (Truck)
- Det, 858th Signal Service Company (Aviation)
- 461st Army Air Forces Base Unit (Processing In)

== See also ==
- California World War II Army Airfields
- 35th Flying Training Wing (World War II)
