= Corcoran Airport =

Airport in California, United States

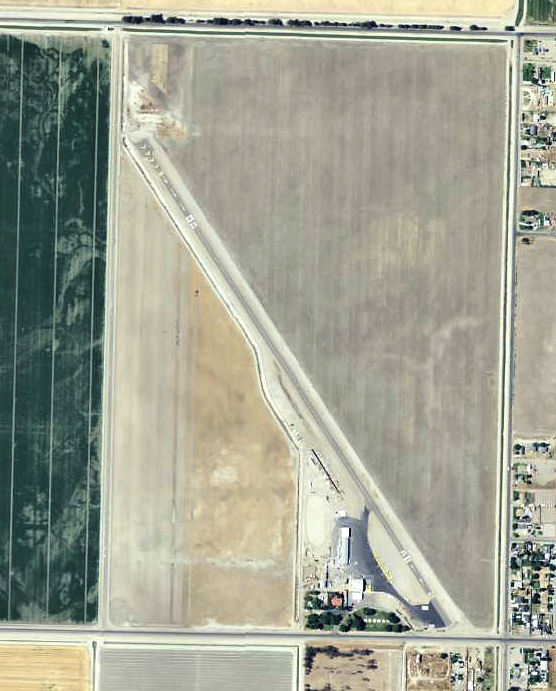
- 2006 USGS photo
- IATA: CRO; ICAO: KCRO; FAA LID: CRO

Summary
- Airport type: Public / permanently closed
- Owner: Lakeland Dusters, Inc.
- Serves: Corcoran, California
- Elevation AMSL: 197 ft (60 m)
- Coordinates: 36°06′10″N 119°35′41″W

Map
- Location of Corcoran Airport

Runways
Direction	Length		Surface
Direction	ft	m	Surface
13/31	3,800	1,158	Asphalt

Statistics (2007)
- Aircraft operations: 5,600
- Based aircraft: 18
- Source: Federal Aviation Administration

Corcoran Airport (IATA: CRO, ICAO: KCRO, FAA LID: CRO) was a public use airport located two nautical miles (3.7 km) west of the central business district of Corcoran, a town in Kings County, California, United States. It is privately owned by Lakeland Dusters, Inc. The airport has been permanently closed.

== Facilities and aircraft ==
Corcoran Airport covers an area of 220 acres (89 ha) at an elevation of 197 feet (60 m) above mean sea level. It has one asphalt paved runway designated 13/31 which measures 3,800 by 50 feet (1,158 x 15 m).

For the 12-month period ending October 3, 2007, the airport had 5,600 aircraft operations, an average of 15 per day, all of which were general aviation. At that time there were 18 aircraft based at this airport: 61% single-engine, 28% jet and 11% helicopter.

== World War II ==
During World War II, the airport was used an auxiliary training airfield for Lemoore Army Airfield, California.

== See also ==
- California World War II Army Airfields
