= Porterville Municipal Airport =

Airport in California, US

Porterville Municipal Airport and Air Attack Base Porterville Army Airfield
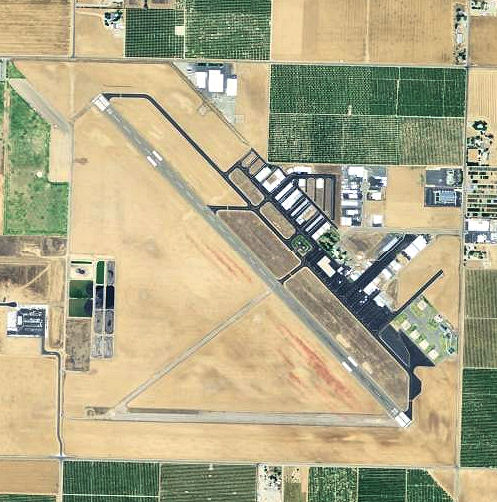
- 2006 USGS photo
- IATA: PTV; ICAO: KPTV; FAA LID: PTV

Summary
- Airport type: Public
- Owner: City of Porterville
- Serves: Porterville, California
- Elevation AMSL: 442 ft (135 m)
- Coordinates: 36°01′47″N 119°03′46″W

Map
- Location of Porterville Municipal Airport

Runways
Direction	Length		Surface
Direction	ft	m	Surface
12/30	6,000	1,829	Asphalt

Statistics (2009)
- Aircraft operations: 43,550
- Based aircraft: 92
- Source: Federal Aviation Administration

Porterville Municipal Airport (IATA: PTV, ICAO: KPTV, FAA LID: PTV) is a city-owned public-use airport located three nautical miles (3.5 mi; 5.6 km) southwest of the central business district of Porterville, a city in Tulare County, California, United States. According to the FAA's National Plan of Integrated Airport Systems for 2009–2013, it is categorized as a general aviation facility.

== History ==
The airport was opened in September 1942 as Porterville Army Airfield and was used by the United States Army Air Forces Fourth Air Force as a training base during World War II. It was a sub-base to Lemoore AAF, being used as a pilot training facility. Improvements to the site included a fueling system utilizing nine underground storage tanks. These tanks were filled and abandoned in place. Also located on site are ten fueling pits, which are presently unused. The field had the Air Echelon element from the Western Signal Aviation Unit Training Center at Camp Pinedale.

At the end of the war the airfield was determined to be excess by the military and turned over to the local government for civil use. The War Assets Administration disposed of the property between 1948 and 1953. In 1948, 835 acres (3.38 km^{2}) were returned to Porterville. The remaining land was sold to the Tulare County Housing Authority.

== Facilities and aircraft ==
Porterville Municipal Airport covers an area of 940 acres (380 ha) at an elevation of 442 feet (135 m) above mean sea level. It has one runway designated 12/30 with an asphalt surface measuring 6,000 by 150 feet (1,829 x 46 m). A shorter east-west runway (25/7), once occasionally closed and used for NHRA sanctioned drag racing in the mid-1960s, was permanently closed during the 1980s.

For the 12-month period ending January 30, 2009, the airport had 43,550 aircraft operations, an average of 119 per day: 98% general aviation, 2% air taxi, and <1% military. At that time there were 92 aircraft based at this airport: 73% single-engine, 11% multi-engine, 10% helicopter and 6% ultralight.

== Airlines and destinations ==
=== Passenger ===
Airlines	Destinations
WestAir	Las Vegas, Reno, Mammoth Lakes

== See also ==
- California World War II Army Airfields
