= Coalinga, California =

City in California, United States

- City
- City of Coalinga
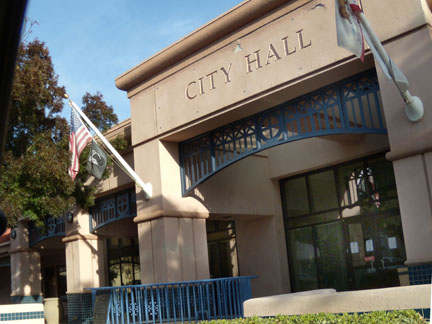
- Coalinga City Hall

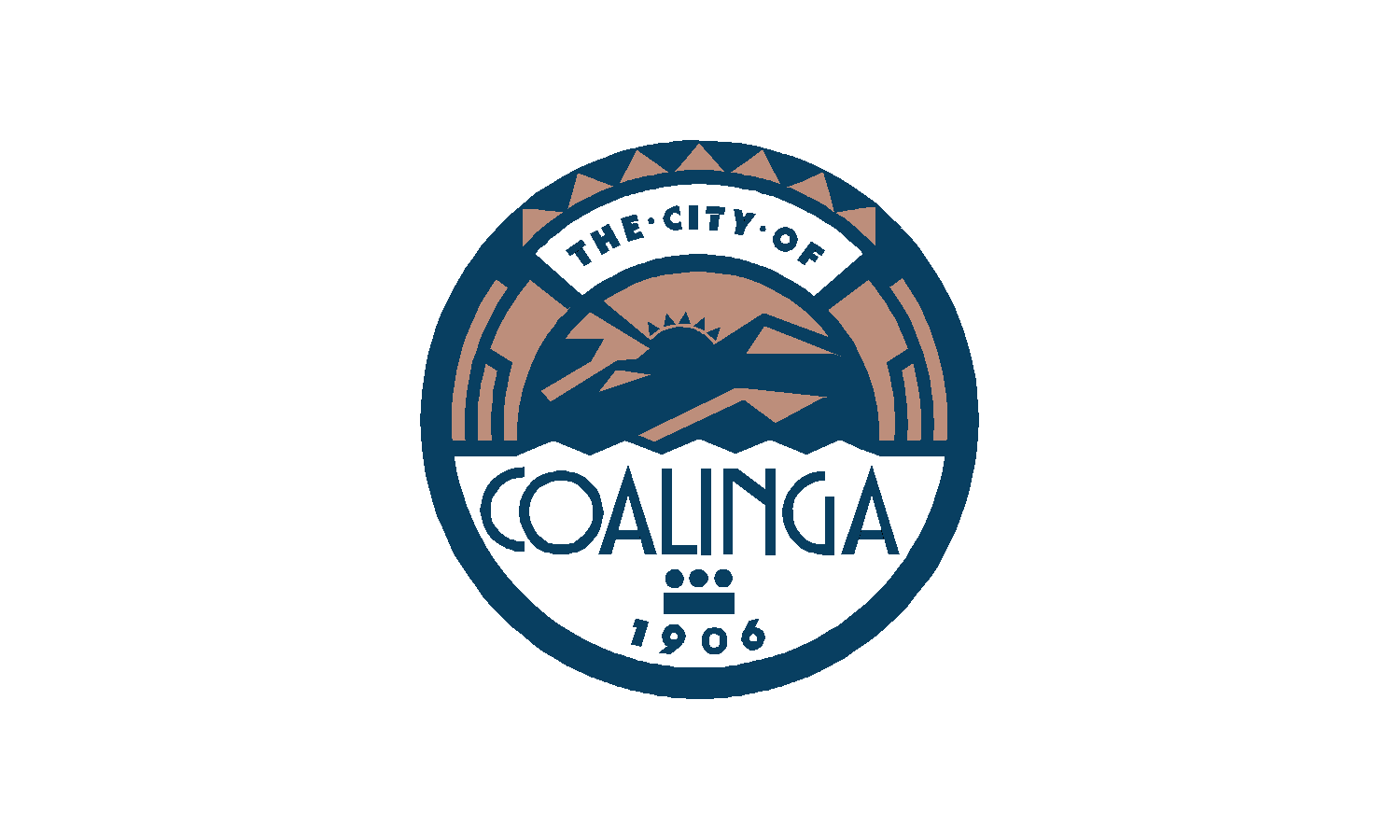
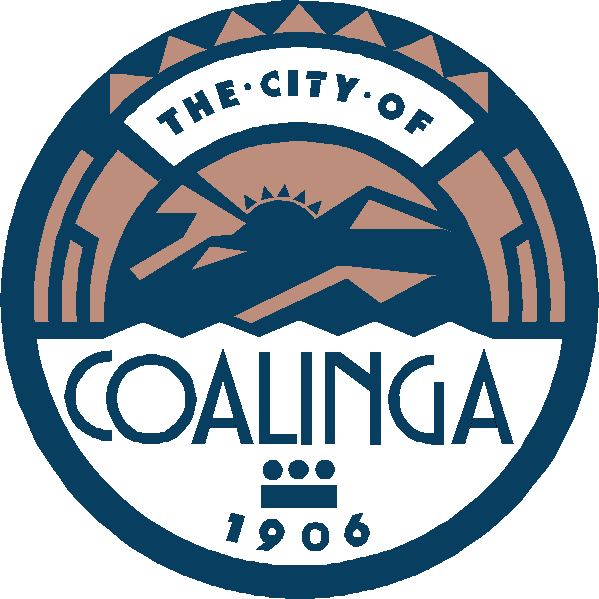
- Flag Seal
- Motto: "The Sunny Side of the Valley"
- Interactive map of Coalinga, California
- Location in California Location in the United States
- Coordinates: 36°08′23″N 120°21′37″W
- Country: United States
- State: California
- County: Fresno
- Incorporated: April 3, 1906

Government
  - Mayor: Nathan Vosburg
  - State Senate: Anna Caballero (D)
  - State Assembly: Esmeralda Soria (D)
  - U. S. Congress: Adam Gray (D)

Area
  - Total: 6.88 sq mi (17.81 km^{2})
  - Land: 6.85 sq mi (17.73 km^{2})
  - Water: 0.031 sq mi (0.08 km^{2}) 0.50%
- Elevation: 673 ft (205 m)

Population (2020)
  - Total: 17,590
  - Density: 2,568.9/sq mi (991.85/km^{2})
- Time zone: UTC−8 (PST)
  - Summer (DST): UTC−7 (PDT)
- ZIP Code: 93210
- Area code: 559
- FIPS code: 06-14274
- GNIS feature IDs: 1652687, 2409495
- Website: www.coalinga.com

Coalinga (/ˌkoʊ.əˈlɪŋɡə/ or /kəˈlɪŋɡə/) is a city in the Pleasant Valley in Fresno County and the western San Joaquin Valley, in central California, United States, approximately 80 miles (128 km) southeast of Salinas.

It was formerly known as Coaling Station A, Coalingo, and Coalinga Station.

The population was 17,590 as of the 2020 census, up from 13,380 at the 2010 census. It is the site of both Pleasant Valley State Prison and Coalinga State Hospital.

== History ==
=== 19th century ===
Legendary bandit Joaquin Murrieta was killed in 1853 at his headquarters, Arroyo de Cantua, north of Coalinga. California Historical Landmark #344 marks the approximate site of where he was slain, near the junction of present-day State Route 33 and Route 198.

Before 20th-century diesel locomotives, steam locomotives were used, and powered in the San Joaquin Valley by burning coal mined from the northern foothills of Mount Diablo to the north. The Southern Pacific Railroad Company established the site as a coaling station in 1888, and it was called simply Coaling Station A. Local tradition has it that an official of Southern Pacific made the name more sonorous by adding an a to it. However, it is just as likely that the small railside signs of the day, which often abbreviated names, read "COALINGA" to mean "Coaling A." [Another example is Braner's Cut north of Eureka, whose sign said "BRACUT," which has now become the name of that spot along Highway 101.] The resemblance to Nahuatl (where cōātl = "snake") is accidental.

The first post office was established in 1899. The city was incorporated in 1906.

Coalinga, California, 1909
Coalinga Oil Field, 1909

=== 20th century ===
View of oil fields, Coalinga, c. 1910

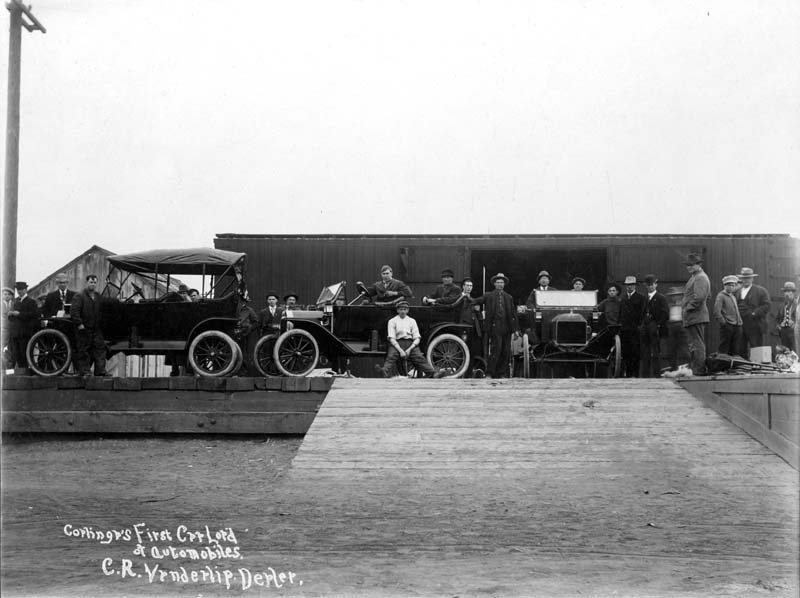
Coalinga gets its first load of Model T cars, c. 1914

The town is mostly surrounded by the Coalinga oil field whose principal operator, Chevron, is a major employer in the area. In the early-1900's, Coalinga had to face the undrinkable nature of its natural wells, so it agreed to bring in by rail tanker from Armona, California, enough potable water to serve the city, at the time about 5,000 in population, but this required an added water distribution system at great cost to the city, thus a third faucet in every home. It is not known if any other U.S. city had to undergo this expense and infrastructure. By the mid-1900's, the city finally approved a reverse-osmosis water system to provide the potable water and to remove the need for the third faucet.

=== 1983 earthquake ===
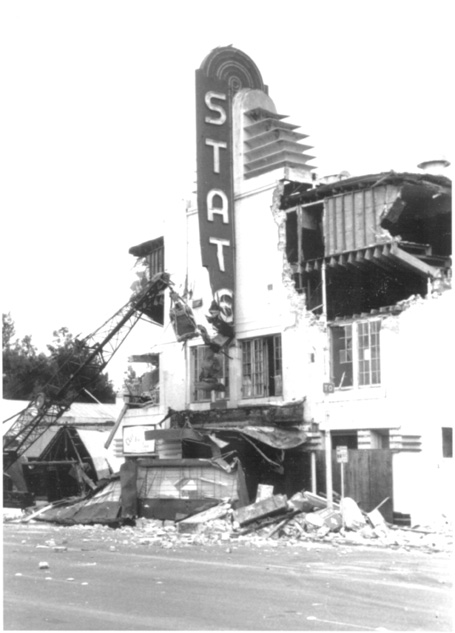
State Theater on Elm Avenue, damaged by 1983 earthquake

On May 2, 1983, Coalinga was struck by an earthquake with a moment magnitude of 6.5, which nearly destroyed more than 300 homes and apartment buildings; another 691 buildings suffered major damage, and hundreds more had minor damage. Damage was severe in downtown Coalinga; the eight-block commercial district was almost totally destroyed. The shock was felt as far away as Los Angeles and western Nevada, and was followed by a series of aftershocks that caused additional minor damage and some injuries. Only one death was reported: a man who succumbed to a heart attack.

=== 2022 water shortage ===
In 2022, the city struggled to confront an acute water shortage. The city’s only water source is an aqueduct that is managed by the federal government. Officials estimated that the water was going to run dry before the end of 2022. Due to statewide floods that winter, though, the prediction was no longer valid.

== Geography ==
Coalinga is located 52 miles (84 km) southwest of Fresno, at an elevation of 673 feet (205 m). The topography is generally level, suitable for a number of field crops which do not require large amounts of water. It is located in the Pleasant Valley, east of the Alcalde Hills, north of the Jacalitos Hills, south of the Anticline Ridge, and west of the Guijarral Hills, all eastern foothills of the Diablo Range. The Los Gatos Creek runs north of town.

=== Geology ===
Underlying rock formations include the occurrence of Vaqueros sandstone. Surrounding the town in a semicircle from the west, around the north, and to the east are several anticlinal formations containing considerable accumulations of petroleum as the Coalinga Oil Field, from which oil has been withdrawn for more than a hundred years.

The city is located near a particularly active portion of the San Andreas Fault, and earthquakes are frequent.

=== Climate ===
Coalinga has a cold semi-arid climate (BSk), with very hot summers and cool winters. Its hardiness zone is 9a. The average annual precipitation is 8.18 inches (208 mm), falling mainly from October to May.

Climate data for Coalinga, California, 1991–2020 normals, extremes 1942–2022
Month	Jan	Feb	Mar	Apr	May	Jun	Jul	Aug	Sep	Oct	Nov	Dec	Year
Record high °F (°C)	80 (27)	87 (31)	93 (34)	101 (38)	110 (43)	114 (46)	118 (48)	114 (46)	115 (46)	103 (39)	91 (33)	79 (26)	118 (48)
Mean maximum °F (°C)	70.9 (21.6)	76.6 (24.8)	84.6 (29.2)	91.8 (33.2)	100.5 (38.1)	107.1 (41.7)	109.0 (42.8)	108.3 (42.4)	105.0 (40.6)	95.6 (35.3)	81.6 (27.6)	71.5 (21.9)	110.5 (43.6)
Mean daily maximum °F (°C)	59.7 (15.4)	65.2 (18.4)	71.5 (21.9)	77.5 (25.3)	86.5 (30.3)	94.8 (34.9)	100.8 (38.2)	100.3 (37.9)	94.7 (34.8)	83.3 (28.5)	69.6 (20.9)	60.2 (15.7)	80.3 (26.8)
Daily mean °F (°C)	49.0 (9.4)	52.8 (11.6)	58.0 (14.4)	63.1 (17.3)	71.1 (21.7)	78.6 (25.9)	84.8 (29.3)	83.5 (28.6)	77.9 (25.5)	67.6 (19.8)	55.9 (13.3)	48.8 (9.3)	65.9 (18.8)
Mean daily minimum °F (°C)	38.2 (3.4)	40.5 (4.7)	44.6 (7.0)	48.7 (9.3)	55.7 (13.2)	62.5 (16.9)	68.8 (20.4)	66.8 (19.3)	61.1 (16.2)	52.0 (11.1)	42.2 (5.7)	37.3 (2.9)	51.5 (10.8)
Mean minimum °F (°C)	28.0 (−2.2)	30.7 (−0.7)	34.6 (1.4)	38.5 (3.6)	45.3 (7.4)	51.6 (10.9)	59.8 (15.4)	58.7 (14.8)	51.1 (10.6)	41.3 (5.2)	31.9 (−0.1)	27.3 (−2.6)	25.5 (−3.6)
Record low °F (°C)	17 (−8)	21 (−6)	24 (−4)	30 (−1)	35 (2)	38 (3)	44 (7)	47 (8)	41 (5)	29 (−2)	24 (−4)	11 (−12)	11 (−12)
Average precipitation inches (mm)	1.95 (50)	1.76 (45)	1.53 (39)	0.37 (9.4)	0.32 (8.1)	0.11 (2.8)	0.02 (0.51)	0.01 (0.25)	0.06 (1.5)	0.33 (8.4)	0.50 (13)	1.22 (31)	8.18 (208.96)
Average precipitation days (≥ 0.01 in)	7.1	7.7	5.1	3.2	1.7	0.4	0.1	0.1	0.4	1.9	2.6	6.2	36.5
Source 1: NOAA
Source 2: National Weather Service

== Economy ==
The city's main industries are agriculture, oil, Cannabis, education and incarceration. The city is home to the Coalinga Oil Field, operated by Chevron and Aera Energy; the Guijarral Hills Oil Field; and Pleasant Valley State Prison.

Coalinga State Hospital opened in September 2005. It was California's first new mental health hospital in more than 50 years, a 1,500-bed facility built specifically to house sexually violent predators.

In 2016 Coalinga was one of the first cities to pass an ordinance allowing for the cultivation, manufacturing and distribution of cannabis. The City sold its old Claremont Custody Center (jail) to Ocean Grown Extracts for $4.1 million, to help the city get out of a financial crisis and to supply jobs to local residents.

== Education and Government ==
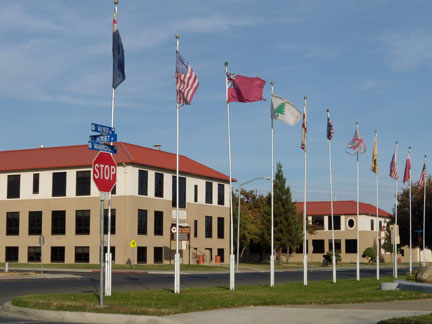
Coalinga High School

Coalinga is the site of Coalinga College (formally West Hills College-Coalinga), which is part of the California Community Colleges system.

Its children are served by the Coalinga-Huron Joint Unified School District, of which Coalinga High School is a part.

In the United States House of Representatives, Coalinga is in California's 13th congressional district and is represented by Democrat Adam Gray.

== Demographics ==
Historical population
Census	Pop.	Note	%±
1910	4,199		—
1920	2,934		−30.1%
1930	2,851		−2.8%
1940	5,026		76.3%
1950	5,539		10.2%
1960	5,965		7.7%
1970	6,161		3.3%
1980	6,593		7.0%
1990	8,212		24.6%
2000	11,668		42.1%
2010	13,380		14.7%
2020	17,590		31.5%
U.S. Decennial Census

=== 2020 census ===
As of the 2020 census, Coalinga had a population of 17,590. The population density was 2,569.0 inhabitants per square mile (991.9/km^{2}).

Racial composition as of the 2020 census
Race	Number	Percent
White	6,449	36.7%
Black or African American	719	4.1%
American Indian and Alaska Native	354	2.0%
Asian	390	2.2%
Native Hawaiian and Other Pacific Islander	38	0.2%
Some other race	7,078	40.2%
Two or more races	2,562	14.6%
Hispanic or Latino (of any race)	11,243	63.9%

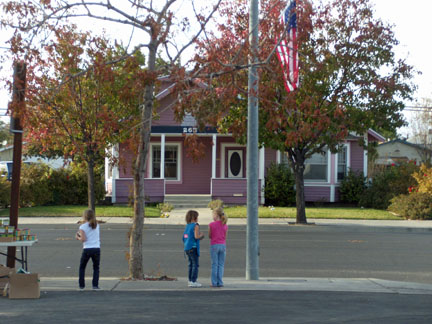
Coalinga house in 2009

The census reported that 73.7% of the population lived in households, 0.6% lived in non-institutionalized group quarters, and 25.7% were institutionalized. The city was 74.2% urban and 25.8% rural.

There were 4,293 households, out of which 45.1% included children under the age of 18, 45.6% were married-couple households, 9.1% were cohabiting couple households, 27.7% had a female householder with no spouse or partner present, and 17.6% had a male householder with no spouse or partner present. Of all households, 20.5% were one person and 6.6% were one person aged 65 or older. The average household size was 3.02, and there were 3,182 families (74.1% of all households).

The age distribution was 22.1% under the age of 18, 10.2% aged 18 to 24, 35.5% aged 25 to 44, 23.5% aged 45 to 64, and 8.8% who were 65 years of age or older. The median age was 34.0 years. For every 100 females, there were 166.2 males, and for every 100 females age 18 and over there were 188.7 males.

There were 4,658 housing units at an average density of 680.3 units per square mile (262.7 units/km^{2}), of which 92.2% were occupied. Of occupied units, 52.0% were owner-occupied and 48.0% were occupied by renters. The homeowner vacancy rate was 2.1%, the rental vacancy rate was 8.2%, and 7.8% of housing units were vacant.

=== 2023 estimate ===
In 2023, the US Census Bureau estimated that the median household income was $78,014, and the per capita income was $24,001. About 13.9% of families and 22.2% of the population were below the poverty line.

=== 2010 census ===
The 2010 United States census reported that Coalinga had a population of 13,380. The population density was 2,175.8 inhabitants per square mile (840.1/km^{2}). The racial makeup of Coalinga was 7,734 (57.8%) White, 549 (4.1%) African American, 171 (1.3%) Native American, 407 (3.0%) Asian, 36 (0.3%) Pacific Islander, 3,937 (29.4%) from other races, and 546 (4.1%) from two or more races. Hispanic or Latino of any race were 7,161 persons (53.5%).

The Census reported that 11,752 people (87.8% of the population) lived in households, 130 (1.0%) lived in non-institutionalized group quarters, and 1,498 (11.2%) were institutionalized.

There were 3,896 households, out of which 1,809 (46.4%) had children under the age of 18 living in them, 1,913 (49.1%) were opposite-sex married couples living together, 658 (16.9%) had a female householder with no husband present, 311 (8.0%) had a male householder with no wife present. There were 341 (8.8%) unmarried opposite-sex partnerships, and 16 (0.4%) same-sex married couples or partnerships. 797 households (20.5%) were made up of individuals, and 220 (5.6%) had someone living alone who was 65 years of age or older. The average household size was 3.02. There were 2,882 families (74.0% of all households); the average family size was 3.49.

The population was spread out, with 3,763 people (28.1%) under the age of 18, 1,610 people (12.0%) aged 18 to 24, 3,646 people (27.2%) aged 25 to 44, 3,308 people (24.7%) aged 45 to 64, and 1,053 people (7.9%) who were 65 years of age or older. The median age was 31.9 years. For every 100 females, there were 123.1 males. For every 100 females age 18 and over, there were 132.1 males.

There were 4,344 housing units at an average density of 706.4 per square mile (272.7/km^{2}), of which 3,896 were occupied, of which 1,996 (51.2%) were owner-occupied, and 1,900 (48.8%) were occupied by renters. The homeowner vacancy rate was 3.8%; the rental vacancy rate was 8.4%. 6,192 people (46.3% of the population) lived in owner-occupied housing units and 5,560 people (41.6%) lived in rental housing units.

== Attractions ==
The Horned Toad Derby is held in Coalinga in late May over the Memorial Day weekend annually. The three-day event is similar to the more famous Jumping Frog Jubilee held in Calaveras County, California, but utilizes locally caught horned toads (lizards) rather than frogs. The tradition began in 1935.

The WHAMOBASS Balloon Rally is hosted by Coalinga annually on the November weekend closest to Montgolfiere Day (November 21) every year. It's the longest consecutively running annual hot air balloon rally in the world. It is sponsored by the Whiskey Hill Atherton Menlo Oaks Ballooning & Sporting Society. Typically, more than 40 balloons ascend at dawn on Saturday and Sunday morning from the athletic field of West Hills College Coalinga. A small number fly on Friday and occasionally on Thursday.

The R.C. Baker Memorial Museum is housed in the former Baker Oil Tools machine shop in town. The museum displays local fossils, models of prehistoric fauna, Native American artifacts, and items from pioneer settlers. A restored 1934 Richfield gas station is also on the museum's property. The museum continues to collect historical items donated to the collection.

The Coalinga Rifle Club, whose 25 point, 1000 yard range facility is west of town, is host to various California State Rifle Championships. These include: California State Long Range, Mid Range, Palma Rifle, Fullbore, Service Rifle and High Power Championships. In the past, the Navy SEALs have trained at the rifle club. It is also the home of the California Grizzlies, Junior National Champions for the last four years. They have recreational facilities for rifle, pistol, shotgun and a 500-meter Metallic Silhouette Range.

The New Coalinga Municipal Airport is host to the annual Northern California Aerobatic contest. This early June event is typically the largest of five annual California regional aerobatic contests sanctioned by the International Aerobatic Club. It relocated to Coalinga from Paso Robles in 2013. Visitors to the airport can view upwards of 45 pilots flying a wide variety of competitive aircraft in five categories of competition over a two-day period.

The Harris Ranch is a cattle ranch that features a hotel, several restaurants, and a gift shop for travelers. It is located on Interstate 5 about 13 miles northeast of Coalinga. The Harris Ranch Airport is nearby.

== Transportation ==
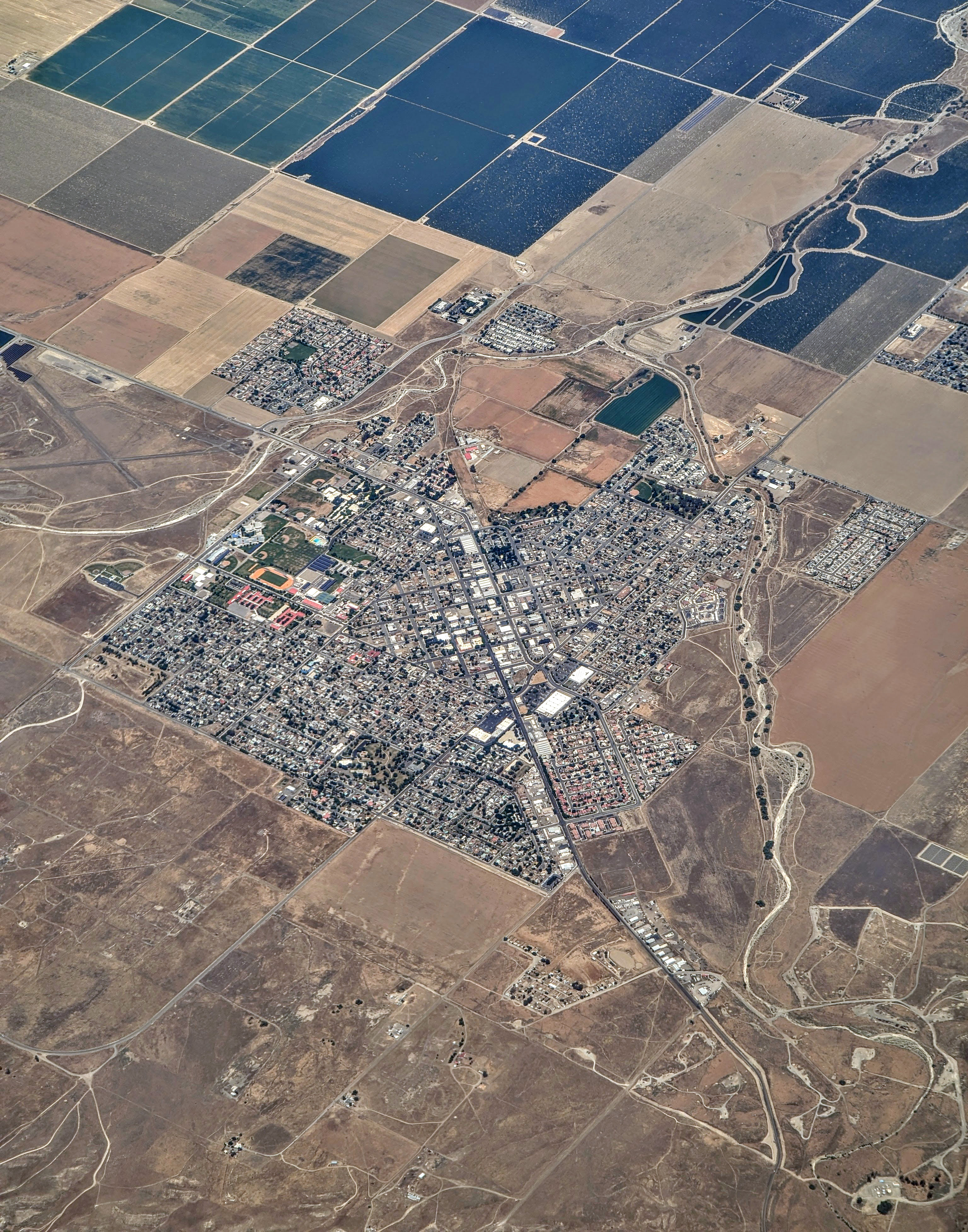
Aerial view of Coalinga

Coalinga is located at the junction of California State Route 198 and California State Route 33.

Fresno County Rural Transit Agency provides Monday through Saturday bus service between Coalinga and Fresno, including stops at Fresno Amtrak and Fresno International Airport. FlixBus stops twice daily at the ARCO station, en route to Los Angeles and the Bay Area.

The city owns the New Coalinga Municipal Airport, located east of town.

== Notable people ==
- Jeffrey L. Bannister, U.S. Army major general, born in Coalinga
- Stanley George "Frenchy" Bordagaray, baseball player
- Hal Finney, computer scientist and inventor of the reusable proof-of-work system that was instrumental in the development of bitcoin
- John McCollum, operatic tenor
- Daryl Patterson, baseball pitcher
- Sirhan Sirhan, convicted of murdering Robert F. Kennedy, was housed in the Pleasant Valley State Prison
- Jo Stafford, singer, television personality, Grammy Award winner
- Pat and Lolly Vegas, musicians and vocalists of the Native American/Chicano rock band Redbone. They were inducted into the Native American Music Hall of Fame in 2008.

== See also ==
- Coalinga, California topics
- San Joaquin Valley topics
