= Schooner Gulch =

Schooner Gulch may refer to:

- Schooner Gulch State Beach
- Schooner Gulch, California, a former populated place
