= Manchester State Park (California) =

State park in Mendocino County, California, United States

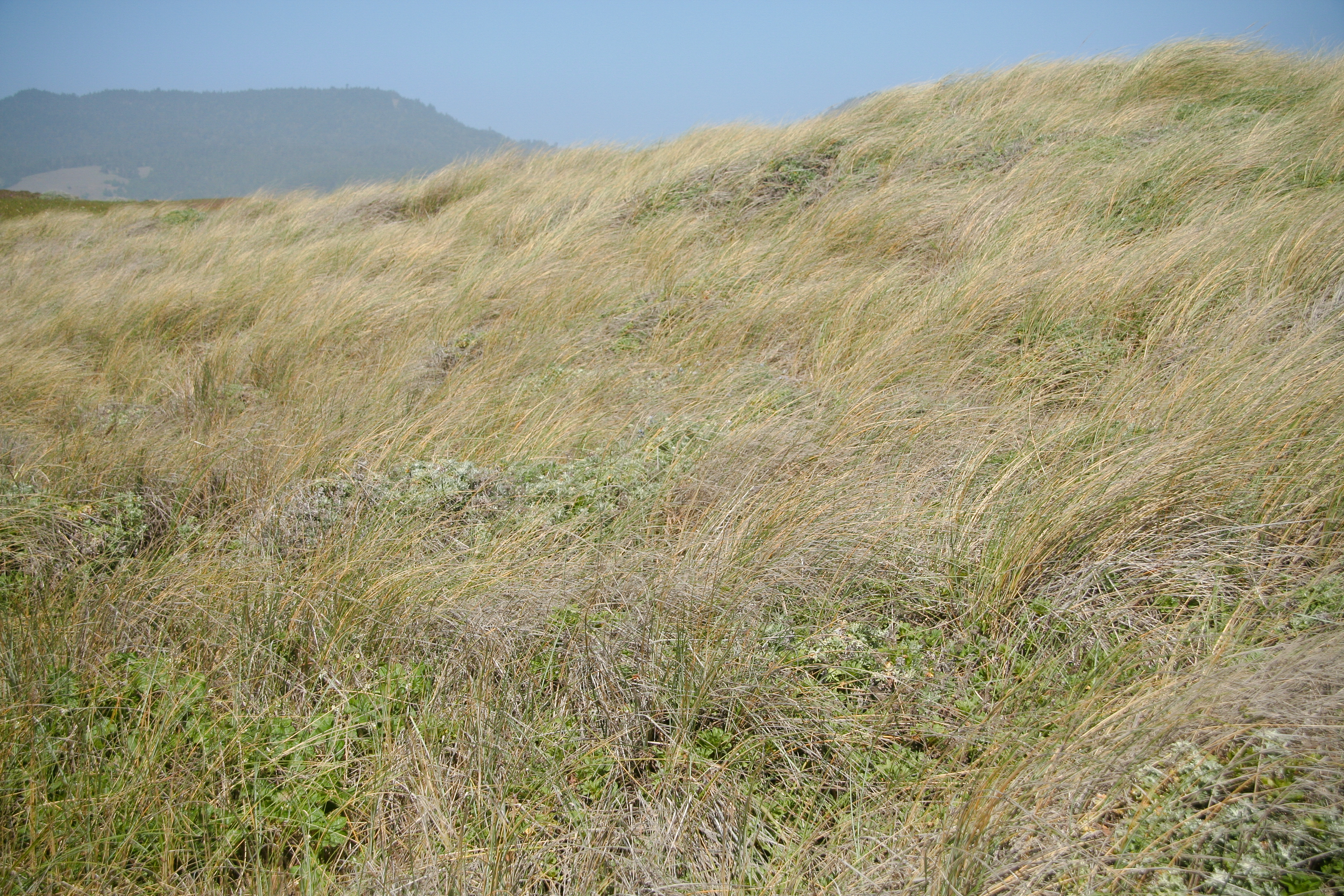
- Campsite at Manchester State Park, September 2010

- Location within California Location within the United States
- Interactive map of Manchester State Park
- Location: Mendocino County, California, United States
- Nearest city: Manchester, California
- Coordinates: 38°58′26″N 123°42′45″W
- Area: 5,272 acres (21.34 km^{2})
- Established: 1955
- Governing body: California Department of Parks and Recreation

Manchester State Park (also known as Manchester State Beach) is a state park of California, United States. It includes 18,000 feet (5,500 m) of protected beachfront on the Pacific Ocean in Northern California on State Route 1, 7 miles (11 km) north of Point Arena. The park features sand dunes, flat grasslands and five miles of gentle, sandy beachfront. The park is noted for steelhead and salmon fishing in the park's two streams, Brush Creek and Alder Creek, as well as the driftwood that collects in the catch basin created by the gently curved coastline. The 5,272-acre (2,134 ha) site was established as a California state park in 1955 and takes its name from Manchester, California, seven miles north of Point Arena.

Aside from the coastal views, Manchester State Beach consists of grazing lands with flocks of sheep, and herds of cattle. Blue Irises, baby blue eyes, lupines, poppies, and sea pinks are featured in the park’s variety of wildflowers. Just off shore, the San Andreas Fault runs into the waters of the park.

From October to April, Humpback whales and Gray whales can be spotted offshore during the annual migration. Right off the coast of Arena Point, experienced divers can dive from boats to view kelp forests and other marine life found in the park's protected waters.

Camping is available on a first come, first served basis. Reservations are required and group campgrounds are available until the 16th of November.

== Marine Protected Areas ==
The Point Arena State Marine Reserve & Point Arena State Marine Conservation Area are two marine protected areas that extend offshore from Point Arena. Sea Lion Cove State Marine Conservation Area and Saunders Reef State Marine Conservation Area lie south of Point Arena. Like underwater parks, these marine protected areas help conserve ocean wildlife and marine ecosystems.

== History ==
Before European contact, Manchester was the territory of the Pomo people, the native peoples at the time. Over time, the Pomo were gradually integrated into white society.

Manchester State Park was one of 70 California state parks proposed for closure by July 2012 as part of a deficit reduction program. It was previously one of many state parks threatened with closure in 2008. Those closures were ultimately avoided by cutting hours and maintenance system-wide.

== Climate ==
Temperatures range from a high of 72 degrees Fahrenheit to a low of 50 degrees Fahrenheit. The park experiences heavy rainfall from September to May with evening fog common throughout the summer months. There are strong winds year-round and warm clothing is recommended.

== Visiting the Park ==
The hike to Alder Creek is a five-mile round trip hike consisting of walks along the beach and through the woods. Arriving at Alder Creek, many waterfowl and spawning salmon can be seen depending on the time of year. Throughout the year, strong winds blast the park's bluffs and beaches. Hikers are advised to check the wind report before planning a trip to Manchester State Beach. As a visitor to the park, expect to see a vast driftwood collection along the coastline of the park. Hikers and visitors will find themselves climbing over piles of driftwood scattered across the beach. Near the park’s south boundary, people can go on tours of the historic Pt. Arena Lighthouse built in 1870. The beach is complemented by an upland area that offers visitors loop trails that venture alongside ponds, through dark sand, and up and around bluffs and dunes. The main trailhead can be accessed seven-miles north of Point Arena on Kinney road where the park provides signage to direct visitors to the trailheads.

Throughout the park, unique wind shelters built out of driftwood, by beach-goers, are featured alongside the bluffs and along the beach. A connector trail can be taken to Alder Creek where a condemned beach house can be seen and explored a half mile into the trail.

== See also ==
- List of beaches in California
- List of California state parks
