= Arena Cove Historic District =

Historic district in California, United States

- U.S. National Register of Historic Places
- U.S. Historic district
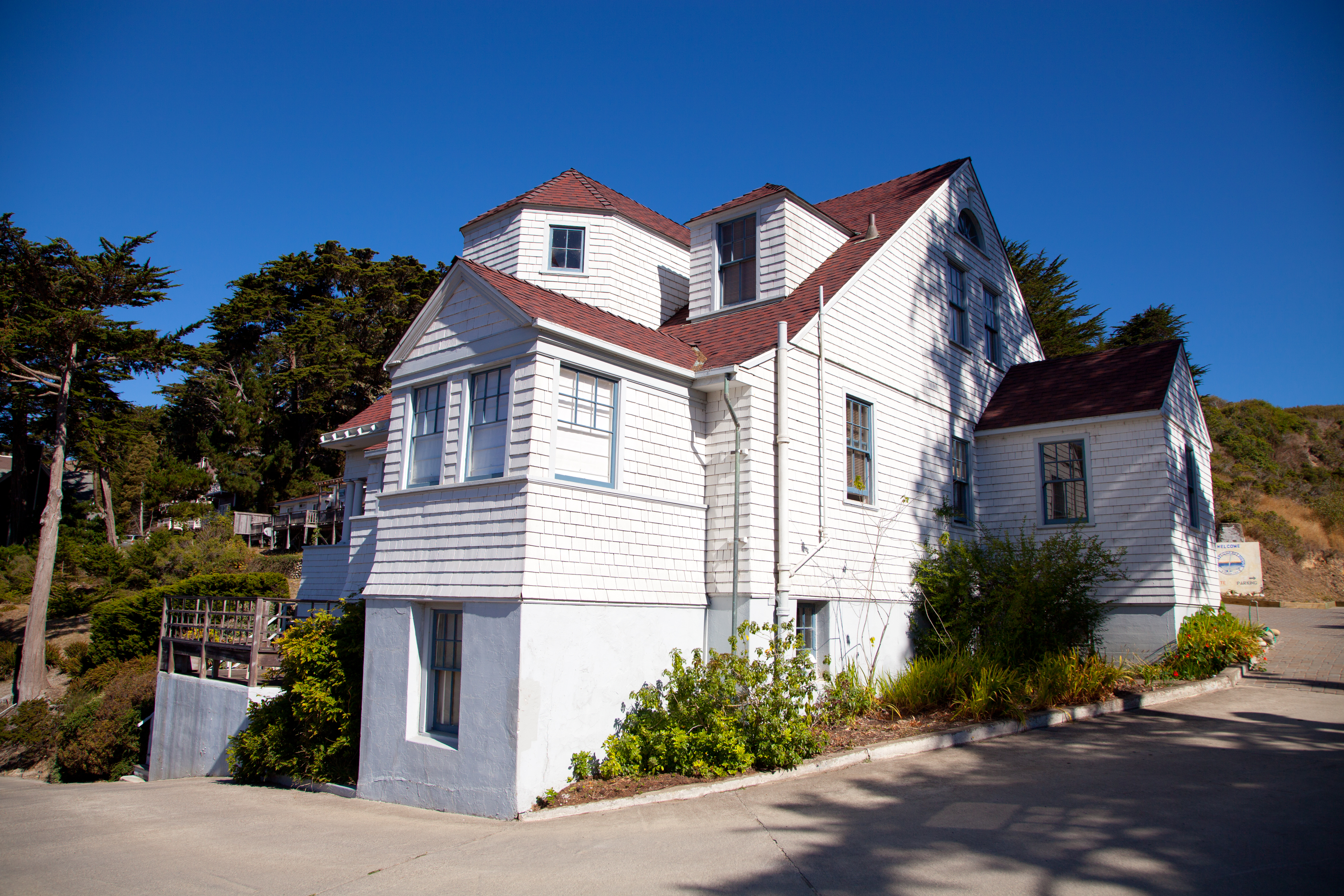

- Location within California Location within the United States
- Location: Arena Cove, Point Arena, California
- Architectural style: Stick/eastland
- MPS: Point Arena MPS
- NRHP reference No.: 90001363
- Added to NRHP: September 13, 1990

Arena Cove Historic District is located on the northern coast of California in the United States. The historic district comprises several buildings and structures and lies in a small cove on the Pacific Ocean just to the south of Point Arena in Mendocino County. It is located about halfway between San Francisco and Cape Mendocino and just down Port Road from the city of Point Arena. The effects of occasional storm surges and tsunami are amplified by the funneling nature of the cove. A small wharf is available for local fishermen and tourists.

== Natural hazards ==
The city of Arena Cove, which has changed little during the 19th and 20th centuries, is no stranger to natural disasters. The city and the Point Arena Lighthouse were damaged during the 1906 San Francisco earthquake, and the wharf was damaged beyond repair during severe storms in 1983 and was rebuilt in 1986. Distant earthquakes have created danger in the form of tsunami, but only mild effects have been observed. A 2.4 m (7 ft 10 in) wave arrived at the cove following the 1946 Aleutian Islands earthquake and a 1.83 m (6 ft 0 in) wave arrived after the 1964 Alaska earthquake.

== National Register of Historic Places ==
It was listed on the National Register of Historic Places in 1990. The architecturally most interesting building at the time of NRHP listing was a Stick/Eastlake architecture house perched partway up the hillside, which has escaped damage during the various tsunami and storm surges. The site includes ten contributing buildings and three contributing structures. The NRHP-listed area is 20 acres (8.1 ha).

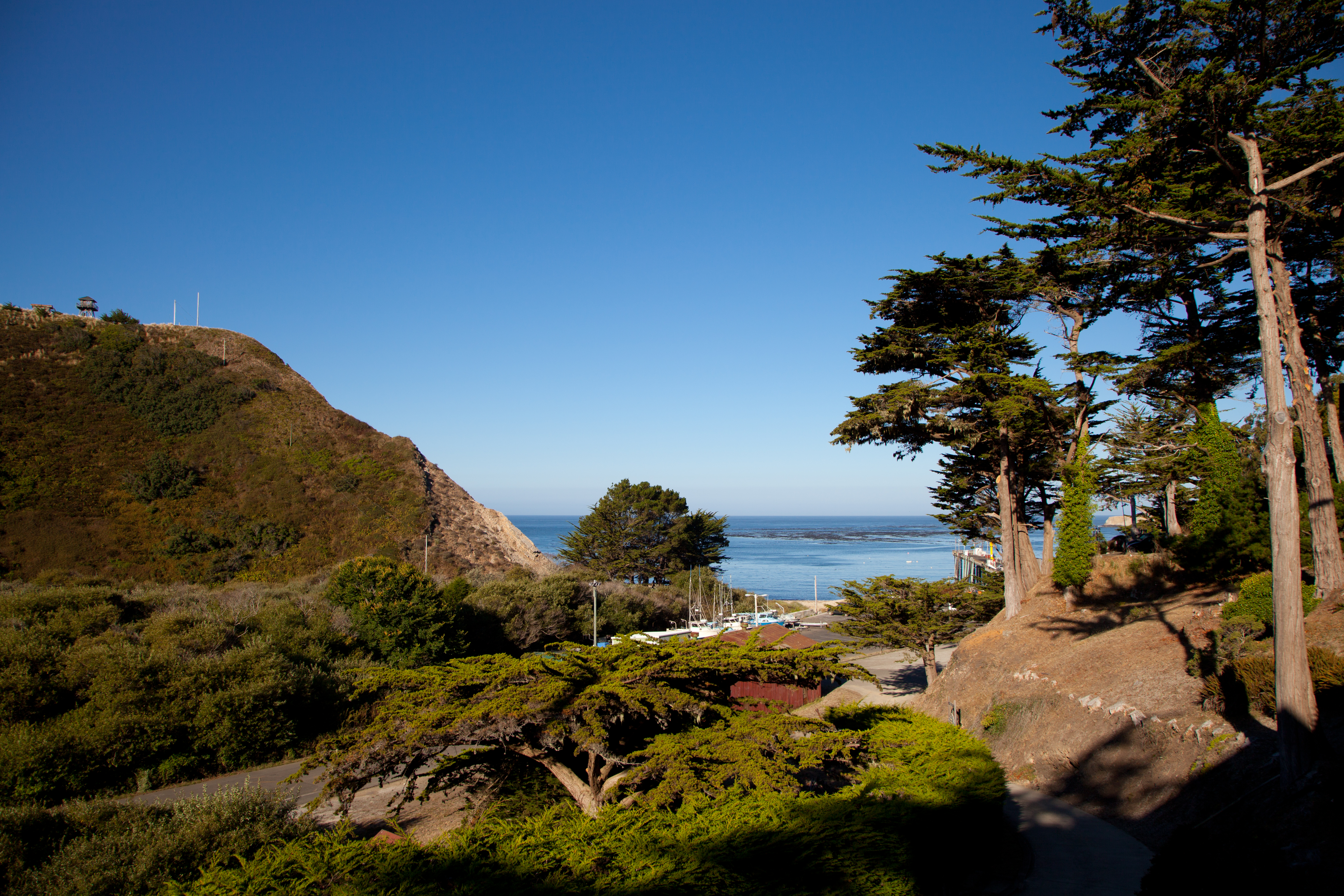

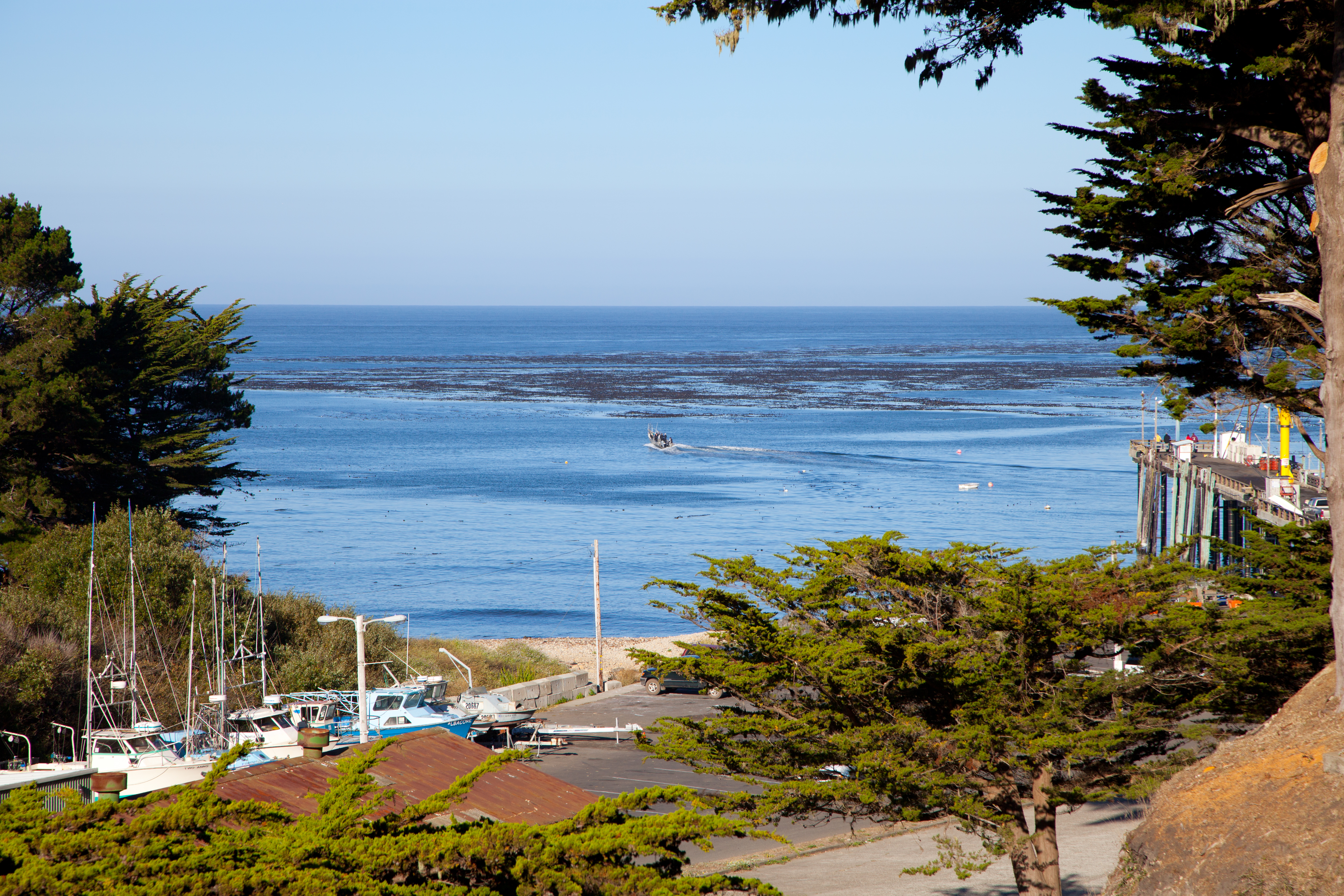

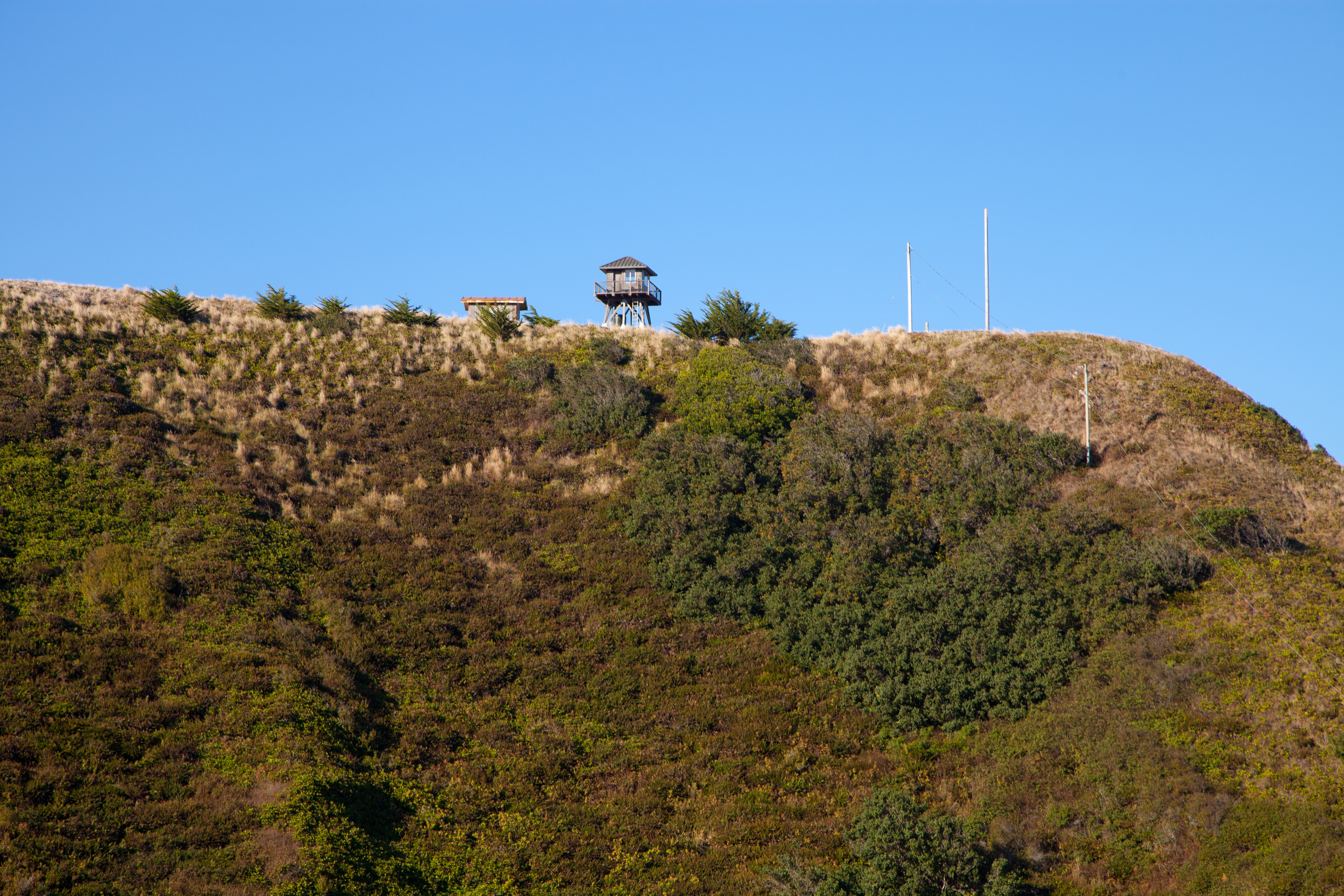

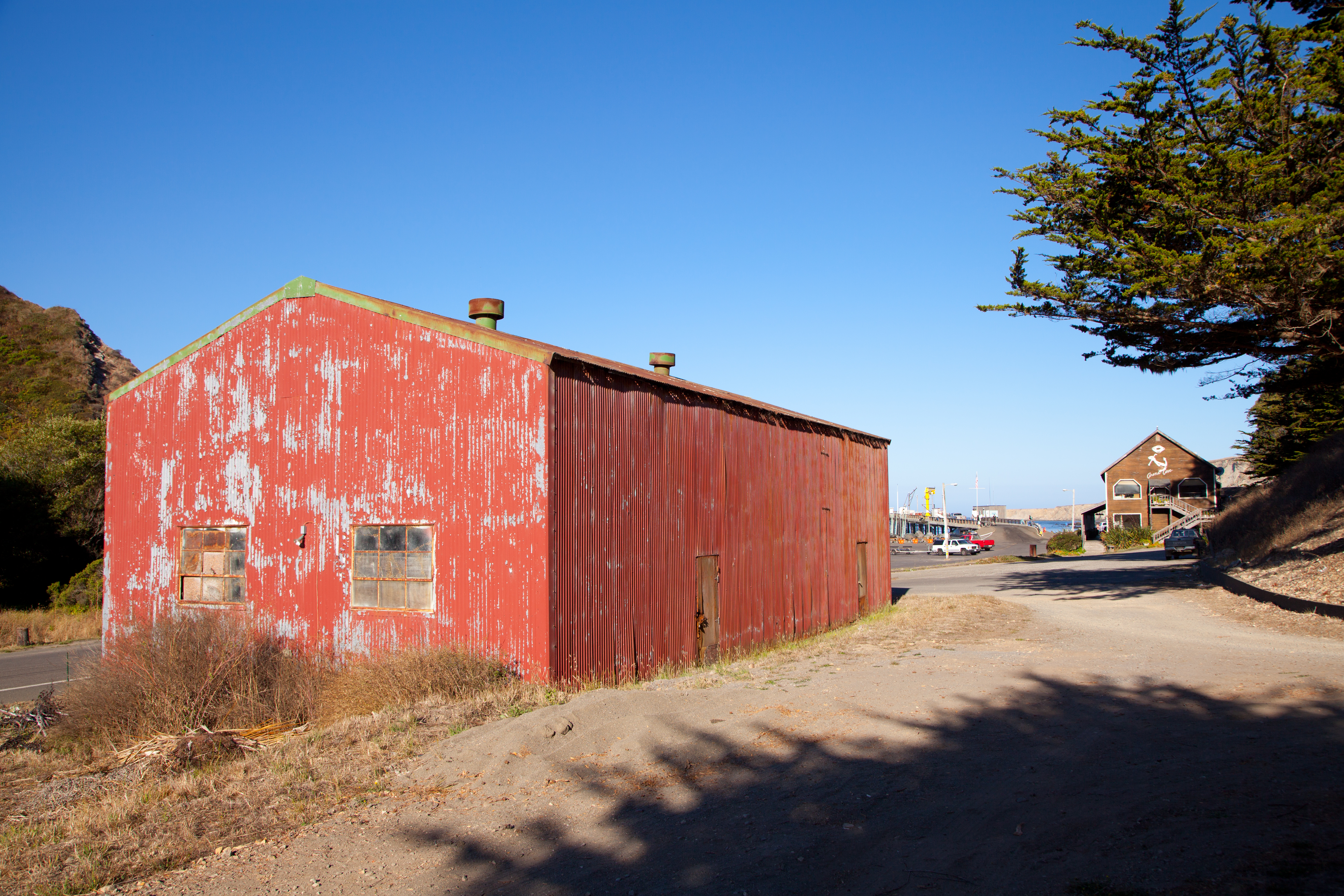

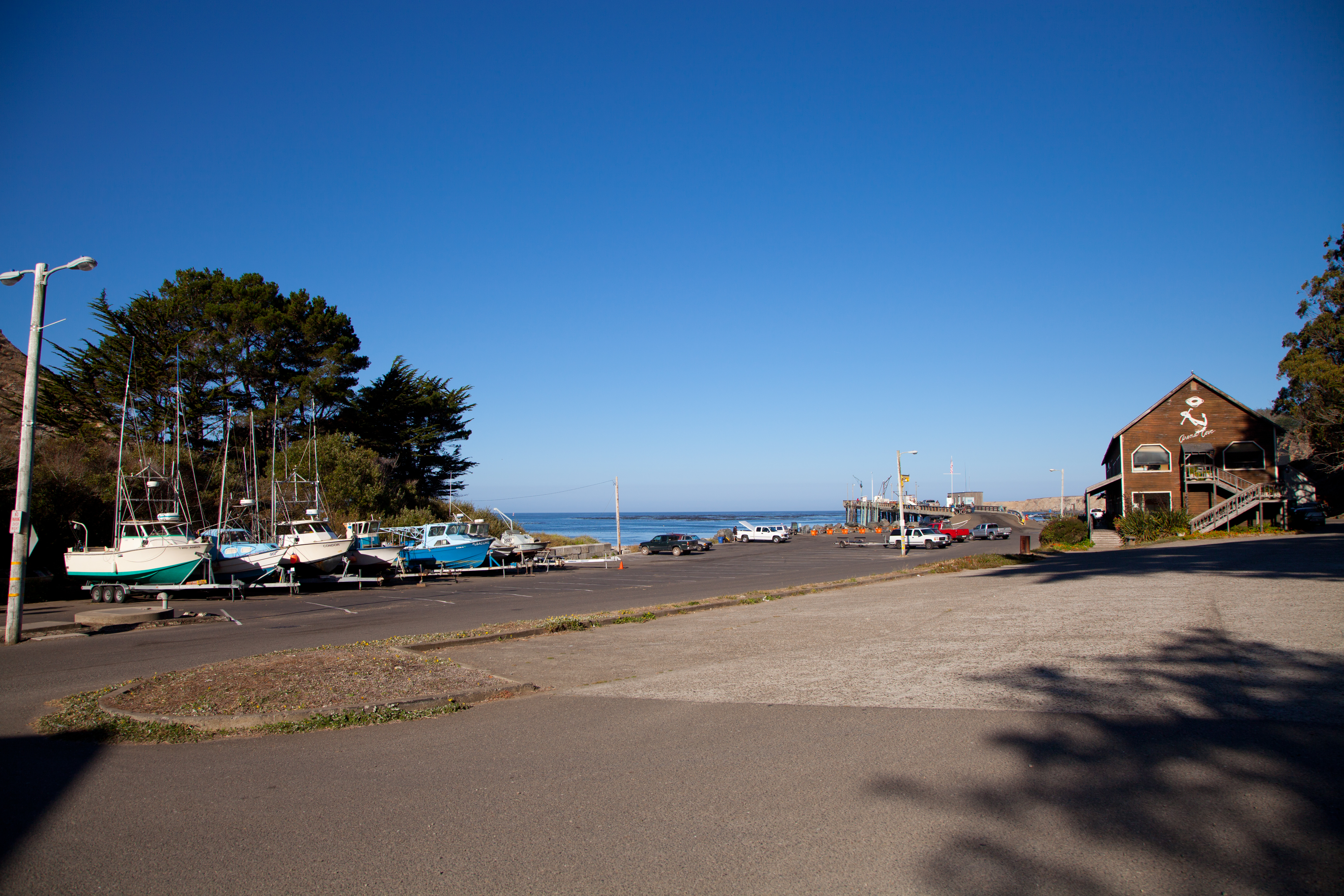

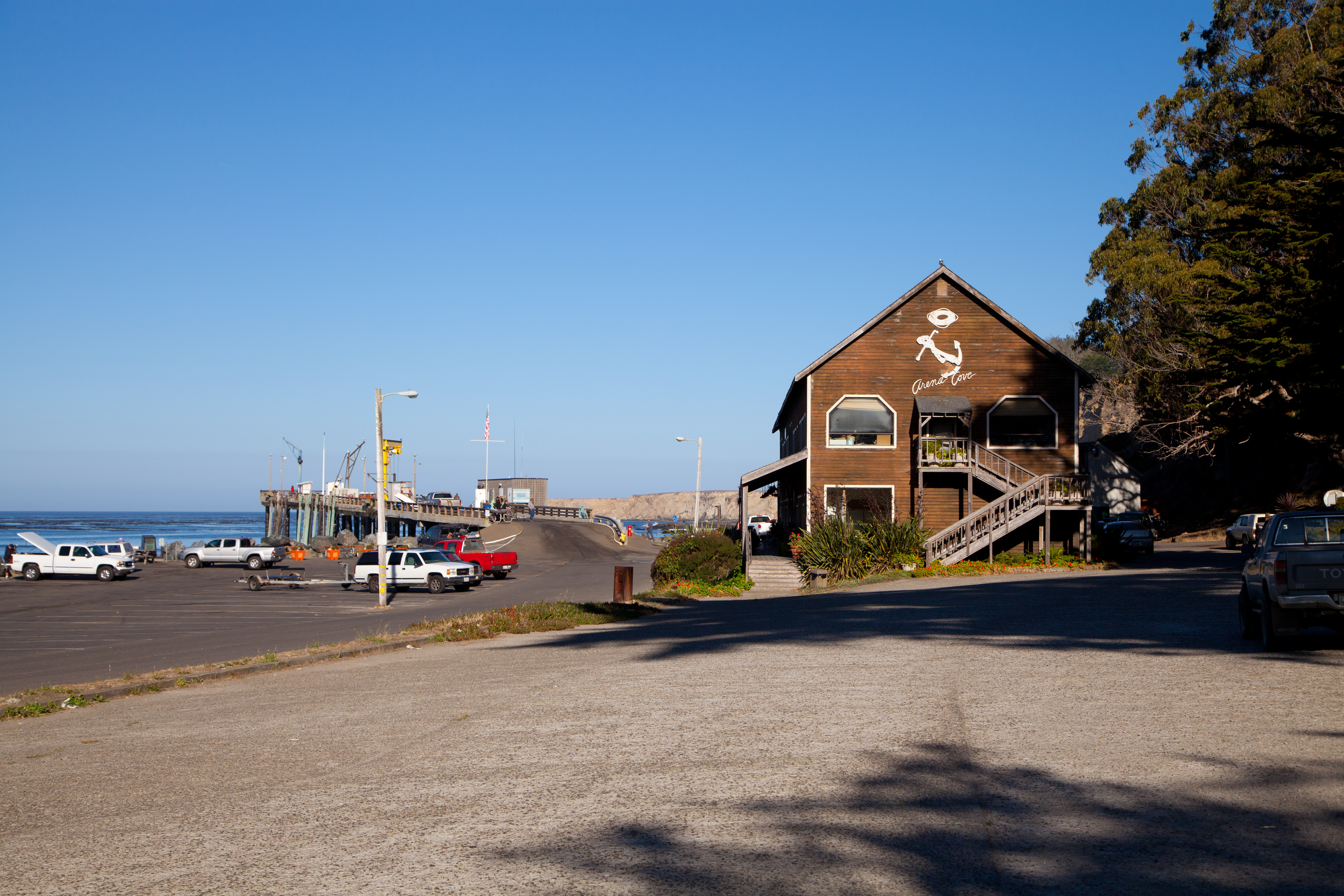

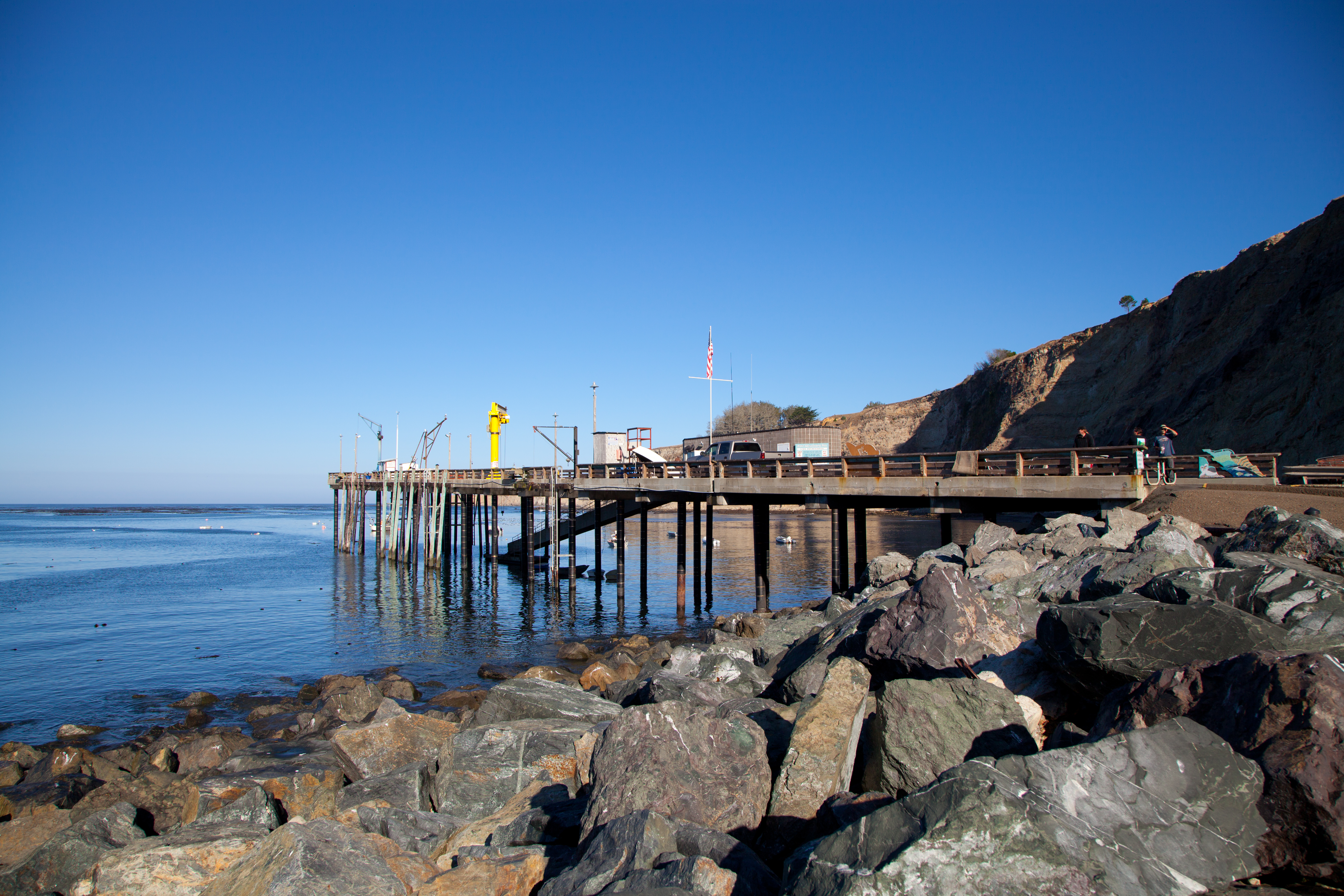

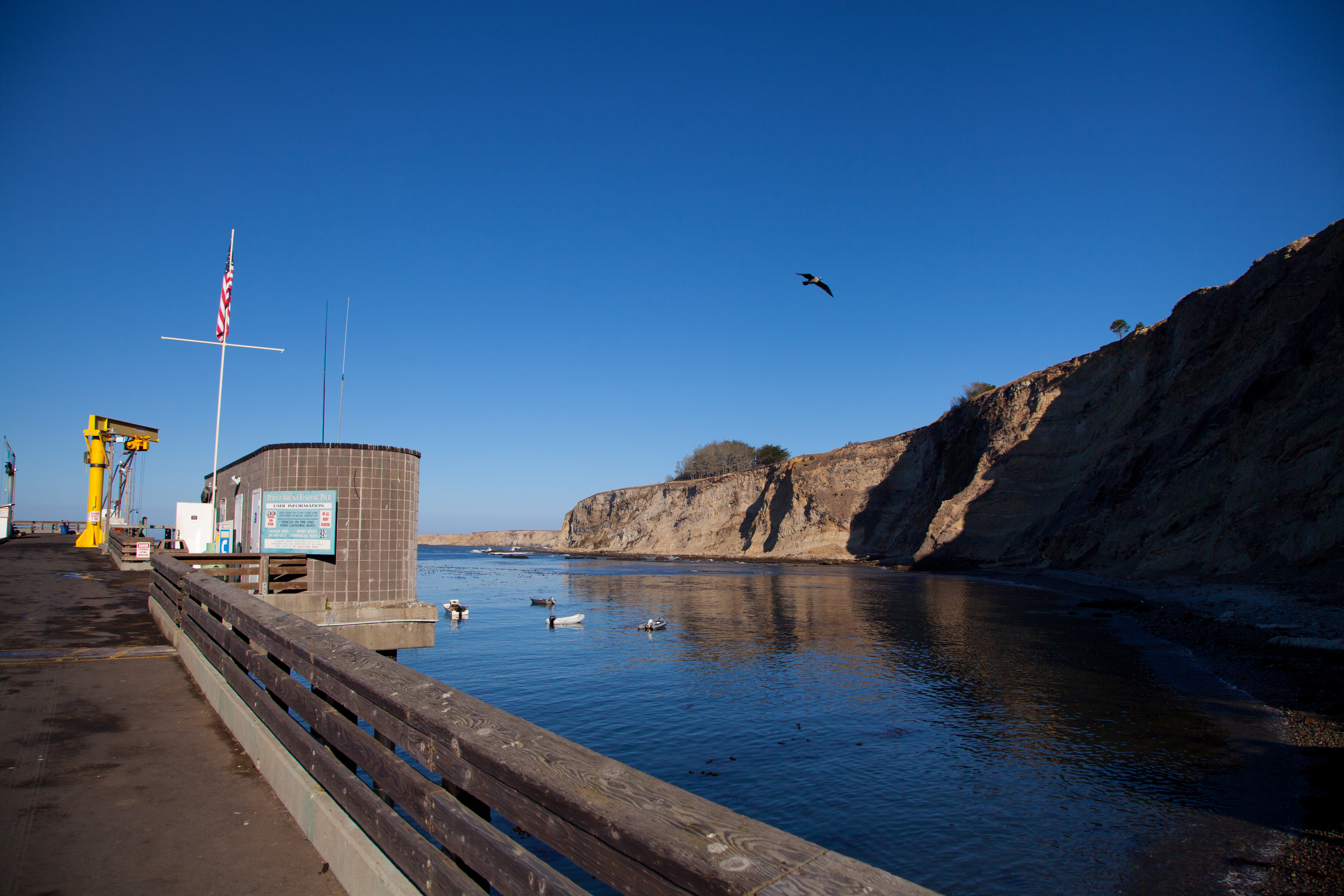

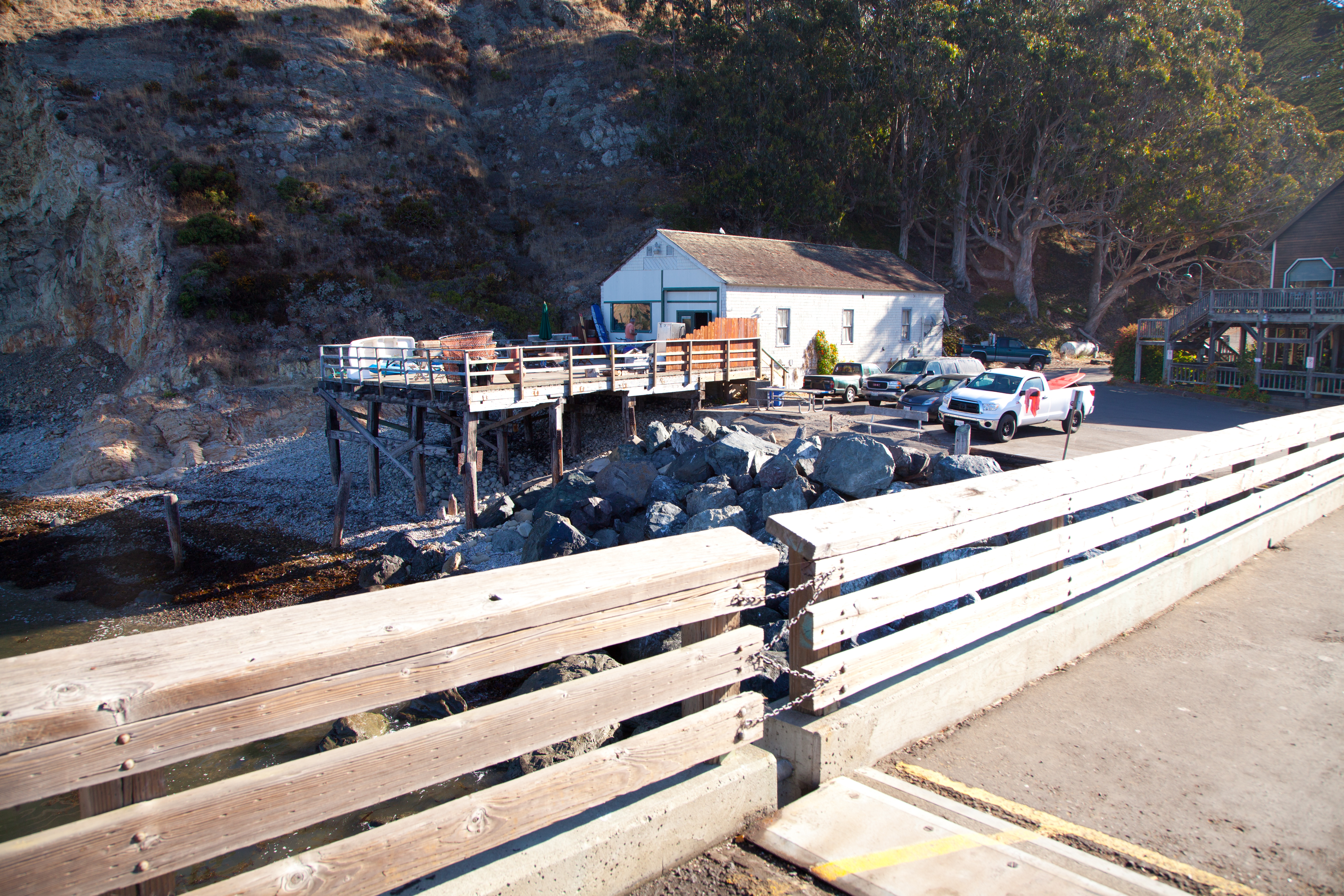

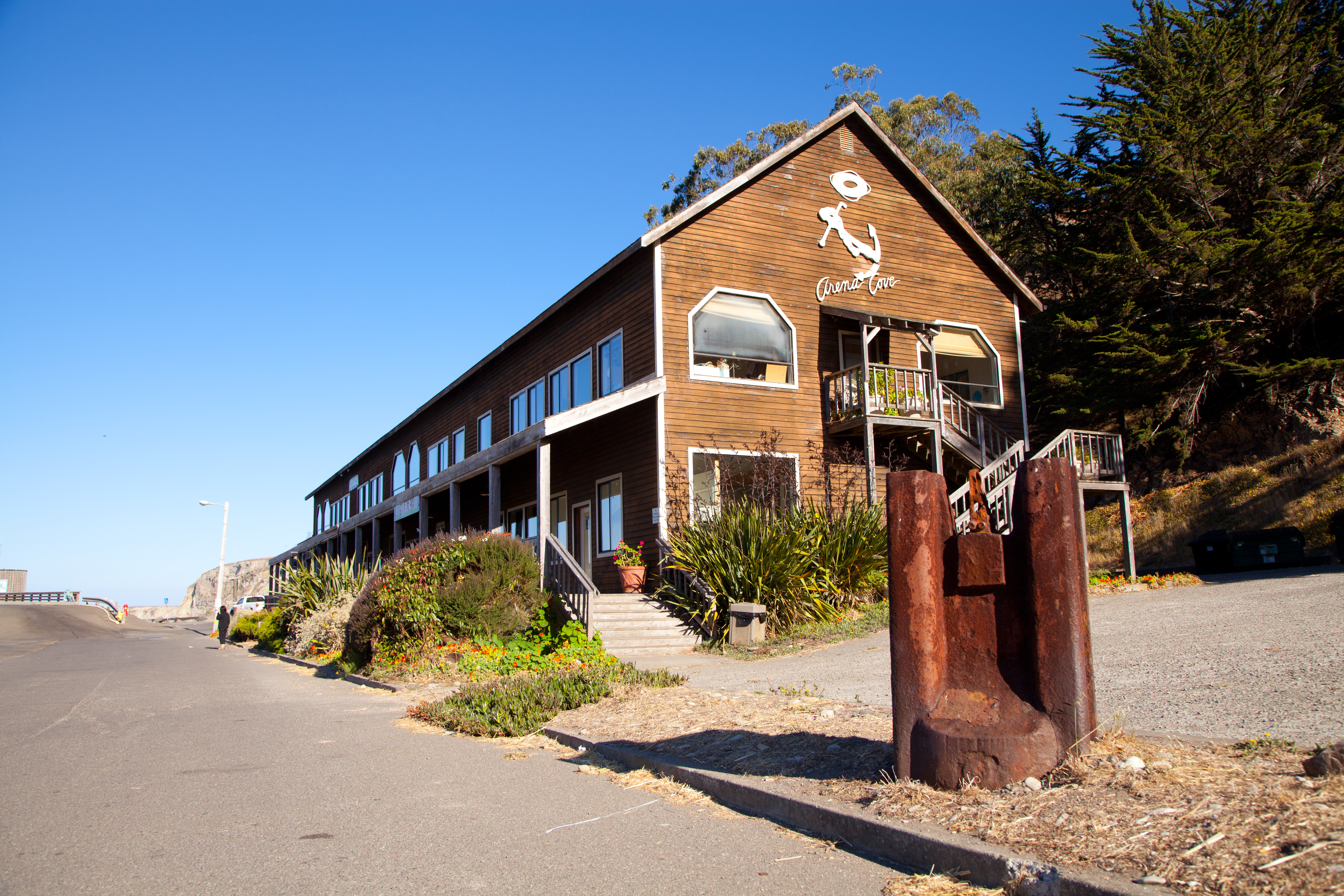

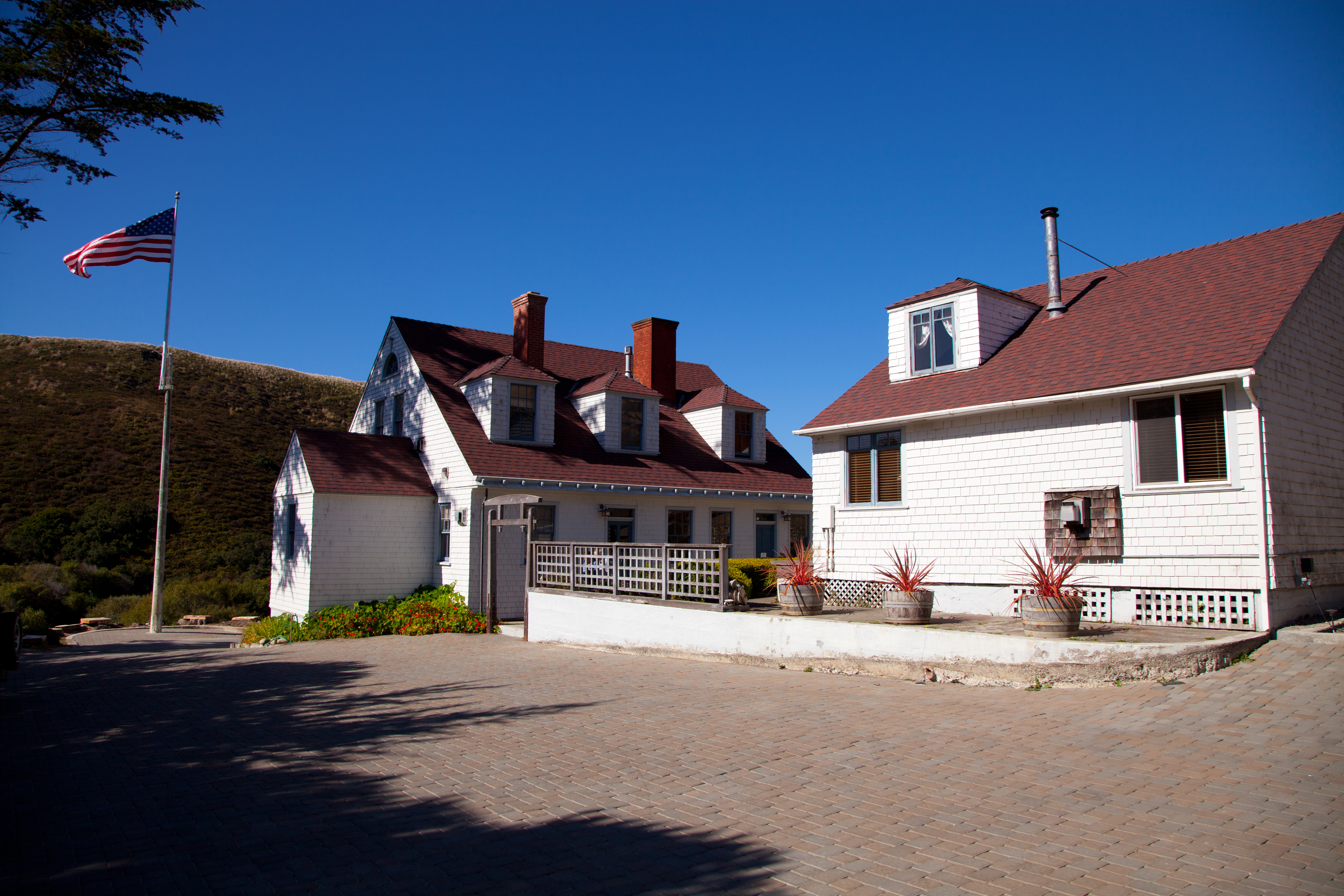

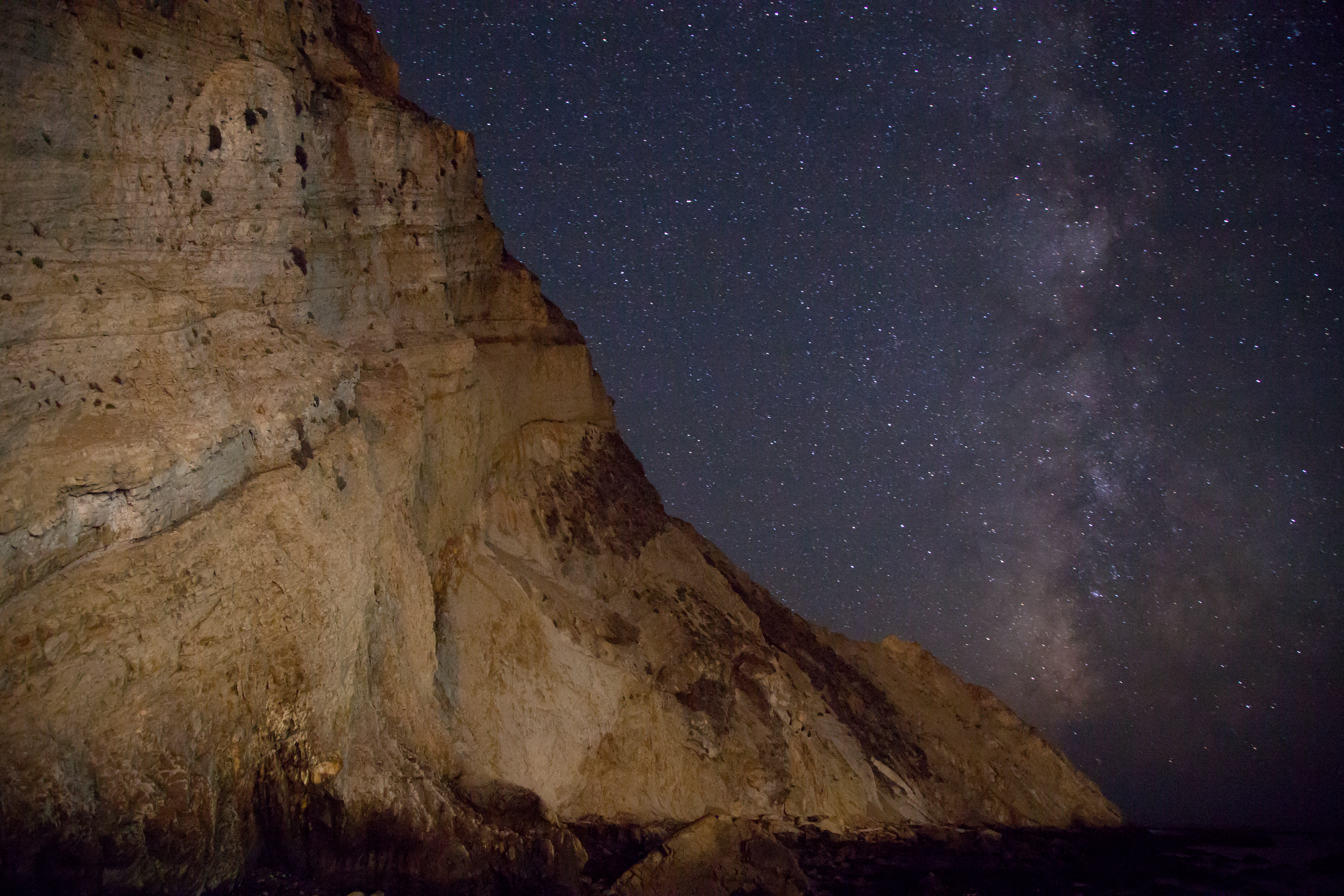
