= Japan-US (cable system) =

Submarine telecommunications cable system

Japan-US (or Japan-US Cable Network – JUSCN or JUCN or J-US or JUS) is a submarine telecommunications cable system in the North Pacific Ocean linking the United States and Japan. It has landing points in:

- Shima, Mie Prefecture, Japan
- Maruyama, Chiba Prefecture, Japan
- Kitaibaraki, Ibaraki Prefecture, Japan
- Mākaha, Oahu, Hawaii, United States
- Point Arena, Manchester, Mendocino County, California, United States
- Morro Bay, San Luis Obispo, San Luis Obispo County, California, United States

It has a design transmission capacity of 640 Gbit/s, starting operation at 80 Gbit/s and a total cable length of 21,000 kilometres (13,000 mi). It started operation in August 2001. It was upgraded to be capable of 1.28 Tbit/s operation in March 2008.

== See also ==
- "Point Arena Cable Station".
- https://web.archive.org/web/20050915213815/http://www.privateline.com/cablestation/. Archived from the original on September 15, 2005.
