= Schooner Gulch, California =

Former settlement in California

Schooner Gulch, also known as Gallaway (also spelled Galloway) was a populated place in California, a timber town and doghole port on the Redwood Coast.

== Name and location ==
Schooner Gulch is the namesake of the a geographical feature named Schooner Gulch, a seaside gully (38°52′18.7″N 123°39′09.1″W) which is in Schooner Gulch State Beach; the gully itself said to be named after a schooner which ran aground there. The alternate name reflects the founding of the settlement by John Galloway.

The precise site of the settlement is not known, but it was near the coast about three miles south of the center of Point Arena and is inside its city limits. The still-standing (as of 2021) Galloway School building is located few hundred feet inland (38°52′08.7″N 123°39′09.1″W).

== History ==
The area of Schooner Gulch was inhabited by the Central Pomo Indians. Russian and Native Alaskan hunters were active in the area from around 1812, and Mexicans owned land in the area in the 1840s.

Scottish immigrant John Galloway founded the settlement Schooner Gulch, establishing a timber milling operation there in 1866. Galloway's mill operated only until 1868, but other mills operated there until the late 19th century, such as a mill owned by one A. Saunders (of fairly large size, producing 25,000 feet (7,600 metres) per day), built in 1875, burned down in 1880 but was being rebuilt as of that year.

The Galloway School District was formally established in 1874. Galloway School, a small school (never more than 40 students), was established that same year and was in operation until 1936. The land around it was turned over to farmland in the 1940s and is now woodland.

In 1912, Russian Baptist immigrants bringing steam-powered heavy equipment down from Point Arena to their colony further south crossed a bridge which then spanned Schooner Gulch when the bridge collapsed under the weight of their eight-ton lead engine. Colonist Nicholas Pogsikoff was killed and was buried at that spot, but his grave is now lost.

Schooner Gulch timber, like all the timber in Mendocino County, was shipped out by sea. Typically, the small habitations which grew around these mills were abandoned when the mills ran out of easily available timber and closed down; the town of Schooner Gulch presumably met this fate.
