= Saunders Reef State Marine Conservation Area =

Marine protected area on California's coast

Saunders Reef State Marine Conservation Area (SMCA) is a marine protected area that extends offshore, just south of Schooner Gulch State Beach and north of Sail Rock in Mendocino County on California's north central coast. The marine protected area covers 9.35 square miles (24.2 km^{2}). Saunders Reef SMCA prohibits the take of all living marine resources, except the commercial and recreational take of salmon by trolling and the commercial take of urchin.

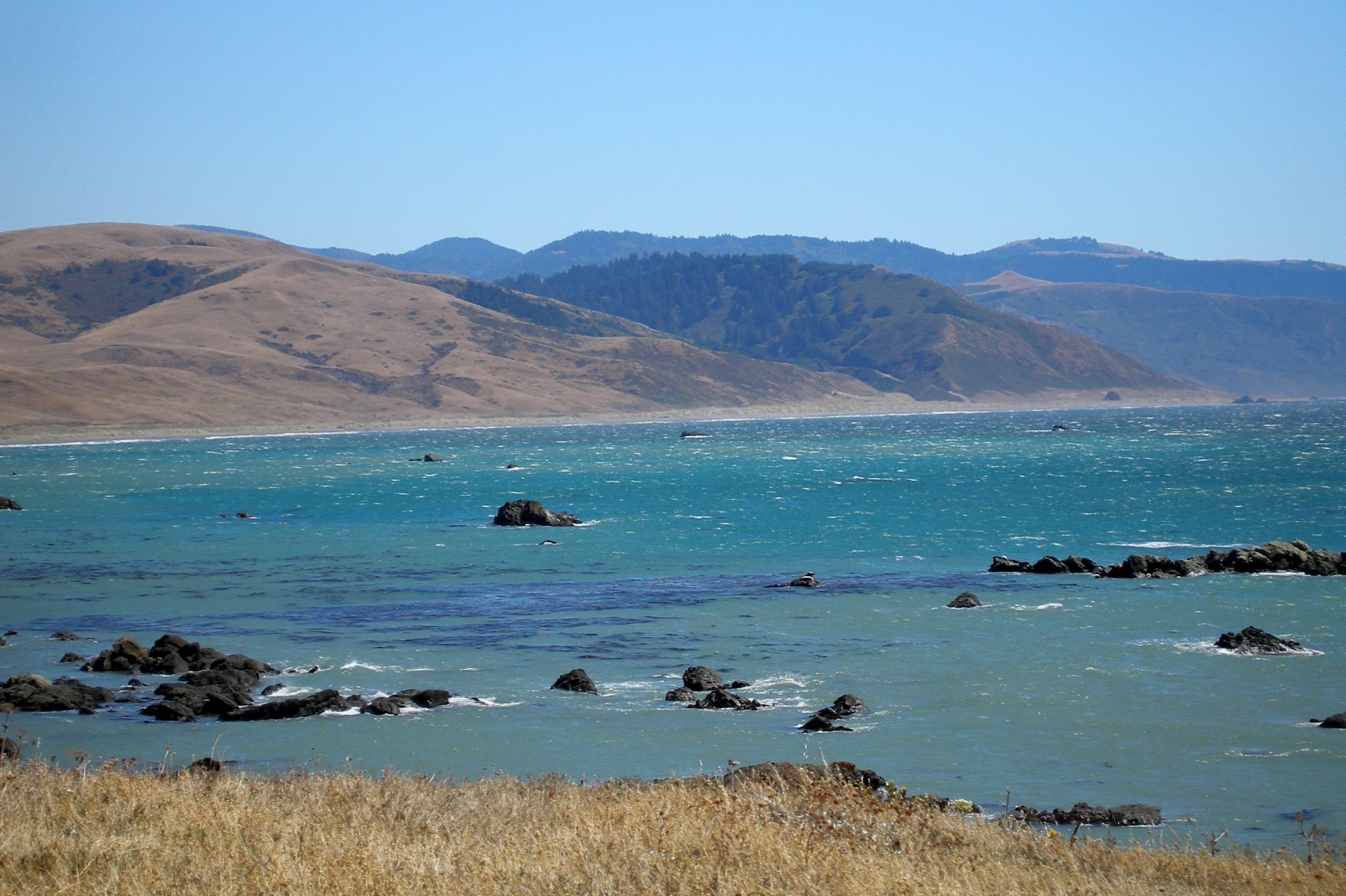
Mendocino Coast

== History ==
Saunders Reef SMCA is one of 22 marine protected areas adopted by the California Department of Fish and Game in August 2009, during the second phase of the Marine Life Protection Act Initiative. The MLPAI is a collaborative public process to create a statewide network of protected areas along California's coastline.

The north central coast's new marine protected areas were designed by local divers, fishermen, conservationists and scientists who comprised the North Central Coast Regional Stakeholder Group. Their job was to design a network of protected areas that would preserve sensitive sea life and habitats while enhancing recreation, study and education opportunities.

The north central coast marine protected areas are expected to take effect in January 2010.

== Geography and natural features ==
Saunders Reef State SMCA is a marine protected area that extends offshore, just south of Schooner Gulch State Beach and north of Sail Rock in Mendocino County on California's north central coast.

The Saunders Reef SMCA is bounded by the mean high tide line and straight lines connecting the following points in the order listed except where noted:

38° 51.80' N. lat. 123° 39.23' W. long.;

38° 51.80' N. lat. 123° 44.78' W. long.; thence southward along the three nautical mile offshore

boundary to

38° 50.00' N. lat. 123° 42.58' W. long.; and

38° 50.00' N. lat. 123° 37.60' W. long.

== Habitat and wildlife ==
Saunders Reef is a complex and highly productive rocky reef and kelp habitat including part of one of the most extensive stands of bull kelp in the north central coast. The marine protected area protects this habitat and its associated species, including nearshore rockfish and multiple abalone species, in a regional center of high productivity.

== Recreation and nearby attractions ==
Nearby Point Arena and Arena Rock are popular areas for divers. The Point Arena Light was first built in 1870, then rebuilt after the 1906 earthquake. The tower held the original Fresnel Lens which cast a beam visible to ships 20 miles out to sea. The 1890 First Order Fresnel Lens was removed from the Tower in 2009 by the Point Arena Lighthouse Keepers, Inc., a non-profit which owns the site. The lens was then moved into the Fog Signal Building which serves as a museum and features the lens as its centerpiece.

Manchester State Beach is the longest stretch of sandy beach north of Bodega Bay and is great for fishing and for witnessing impressive collections of giant driftwood logs. Visitors to Alder Creek or the Garcia River within Manchester can enjoy pods of harbor porpoises at play, spawning steelhead, and wintering waterfowl.

Schooner Gulch State Beach is three miles south of Point Arena, where Schooner Gulch Road intersects State Highway 1. There are two trails, one leading to Schooner Gulch Beach, the other Bowling Ball Beach, and activities include surfing, fishing and picnicking.

Saunders Reef SMCA prohibits the take of all living marine resources, except the commercial and recreational take of salmon by trolling and the commercial take of urchin. California's marine protected areas encourage recreational and educational uses of the ocean. Activities such as kayaking, diving, snorkeling, and swimming are allowed unless otherwise restricted.

== Scientific monitoring ==
As specified by the Marine Life Protection Act, select marine protected areas along California's central coast are being monitored by scientists to track their effectiveness and learn more about ocean health. Similar studies in marine protected areas located off of the Santa Barbara Channel Islands have already detected gradual improvements in fish size and number.
