= Point Arena State Marine Reserve & Point Arena State Marine Conservation Area =

Marine protected areas of California, United States

Coordinates: 38.962°N 123.768°W

Point Arena State Marine Reserve (SMR) and Point Arena State Marine Conservation Area (SMCA) are two adjoining marine protected areas that extend offshore of Point Arena in Mendocino County on California’s north central coast. The combined area of these marine protected areas is 11.11 square miles (28.8 km^{2}), with 4.38 square miles (11.3 km^{2}) in the SMR and 6.73 square miles (17.4 km^{2}) in the SMCA. Point Arena SMR prohibits the take of all living marine resources. Point Arena SMCA prohibits the take of all living marine resources, except commercial and recreational salmon trolling.

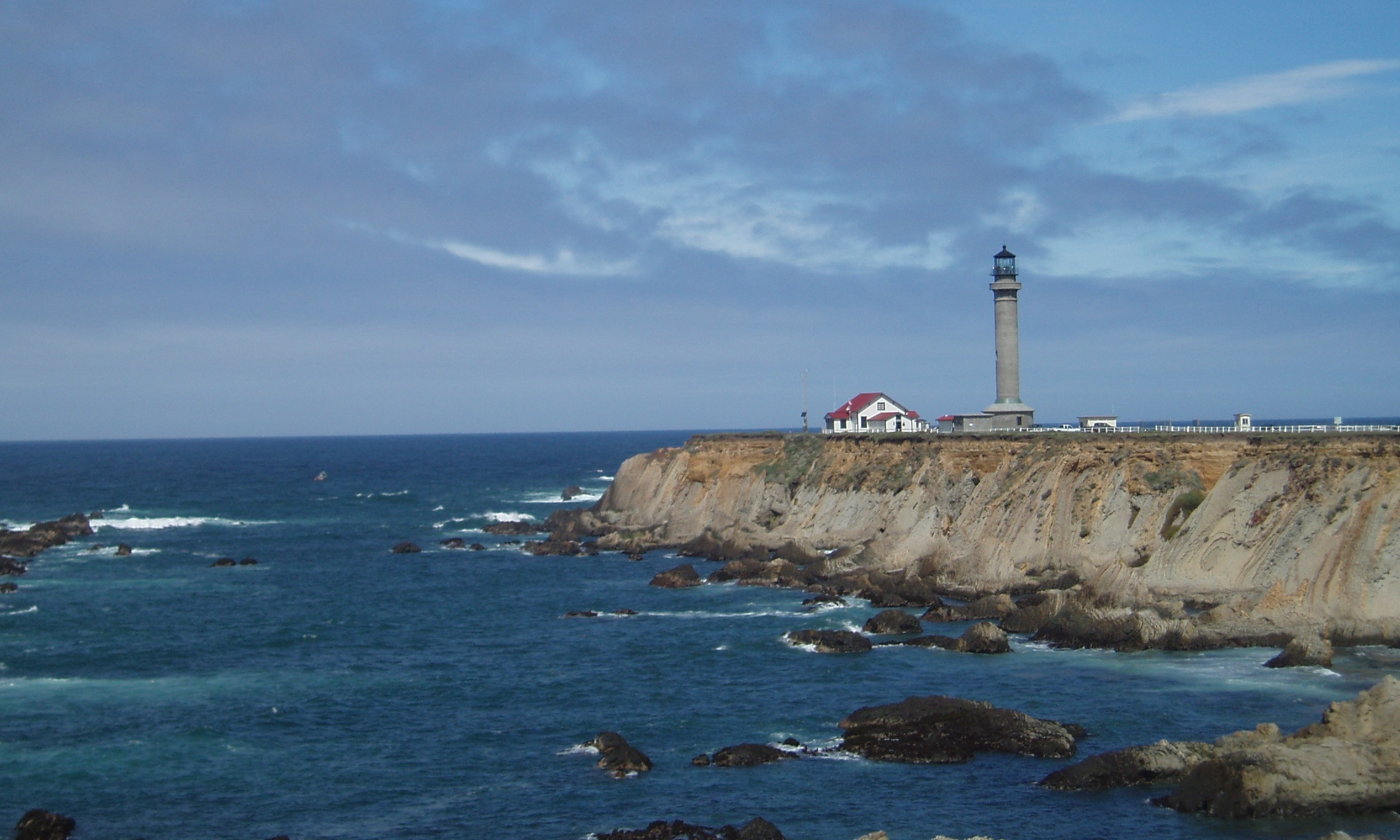
Point Arena Light

== History ==
Point Arena SMR and Point Arena SMCA are two of 22 marine protected areas adopted by the California Department of Fish and Game in August 2009, during the second phase of the Marine Life Protection Act Initiative. The MLPAI is a collaborative public process to create a statewide network of protected areas along California’s coastline.

The north central coast’s new marine protected areas were designed by local divers, fishermen, conservationists, and scientists who comprised the North Central Coast Regional Stakeholder Group. Their job was to design a network of protected areas that would preserve sensitive sea life and habitats while enhancing recreation, study and education opportunities.

The north central coast marine protected areas took effect May 1, 2010.

== Geography and natural features ==
Point Arena SMR and Point Arena SMCA are two adjoining marine protected areas that extend offshore of Point Arena in Mendocino County on California’s north central coast. These marine protected areas adjoin the Sea Lion Cove State Marine Conservation Area at its northern boundary. Point Arena is a peninsula that extends 0.5 miles (800 m) into the Pacific Ocean and is the site of the Point Arena Light. These marine protected areas encompass Arena Rock, which lies offshore. The SMR is onshore and the SMCA is offshore. Manchester State Beach begins just north of Point Arena and extends for five miles and Schooner Gulch State Beach is three miles south of Point Arena.

The Point Arena SMR is bounded by the mean high tide line and straight lines connecting the following points in the order listed:

38° 57.35’ N. lat. 123° 44.50’ W. long.;

38° 59.00’ N. lat. 123° 44.50’ W. long.;

38° 59.00’ N. lat. 123° 46.00’ W. long.;

38° 56.40’ N. lat. 123° 46.00’ W. long.; and

38° 56.40’ N. lat. 123° 43.82’ W. long.

The Point Arena SMCA is bounded by straight lines connecting the following points in the order listed except where noted:

38° 59.00’ N. lat. 123° 46.00’ W. long.;

38° 59.00’ N. lat. 123° 48.16’ W. long.; thence southward along the three nautical mile offshore boundary to

38° 56.40’ N. lat. 123° 48.35’ W. long.;

38° 56.40’ N. lat. 123° 46.00’ W. long.; and

38° 59.00’ N. lat. 123° 46.00’ W. long.

== Habitat and wildlife ==
Point Arena is one of the major upwelling zones along the West coast of the U.S., which means it is a source of nutrients for fish and wildlife. Kelp forests and rocky reefs shelter red abalone at Arena Rock and underwater caves host a highly diverse fish fauna that once included abundant populations of yelloweye and vermillion rockfish, lingcod and giant Pacific octopus.

== Recreation and nearby attractions ==
Point Arena and Arena Rock are popular areas for divers. The Point Arena Lighthouse was first built in 1870, then rebuilt after the 1906 earthquake. The tower still holds the original Fresnel Lens, which casts a beam visible to ships 20 miles (32 km) out to sea.

Manchester State Beach is the longest stretch of sandy beach north of Bodega Bay and is great for fishing and for witnessing impressive collections of giant driftwood logs. Visitors to Alder Creek or the Garcia River within Manchester can enjoy pods of harbor porpoises at play, spawning steelhead, and wintering waterfowl.

Schooner Gulch State Beach is three miles (5 km) south of Point Arena, where Schooner Gulch Road intersects State Highway 1. There are two trails, one leading to Schooner Gulch Beach, the other Bowling Ball Beach, and activities include surfing, fishing and picnicking. This area was frequented by Russians and native Alaskans hunters as early as 1812, and by Mexican land owners in the 1840s.

Point Arena SMR prohibits the take of all living marine resources. Point Arena SMCA prohibits the take of all living marine resources, except commercial and recreational salmon trolling. However, California's marine protected areas encourage recreational and educational uses of the ocean. Activities such as kayaking, diving, snorkeling, and swimming are allowed unless otherwise restricted.

== Scientific monitoring ==
As specified by the Marine Life Protection Act, select marine protected areas along California's central coast are being monitored by scientists to track their effectiveness and learn more about ocean health. Similar studies in marine protected areas located off of the Santa Barbara Channel Islands have already detected gradual improvements in fish size and number.
