= Sea Lion Cove State Marine Conservation Area =

Marine protected area on California's coast

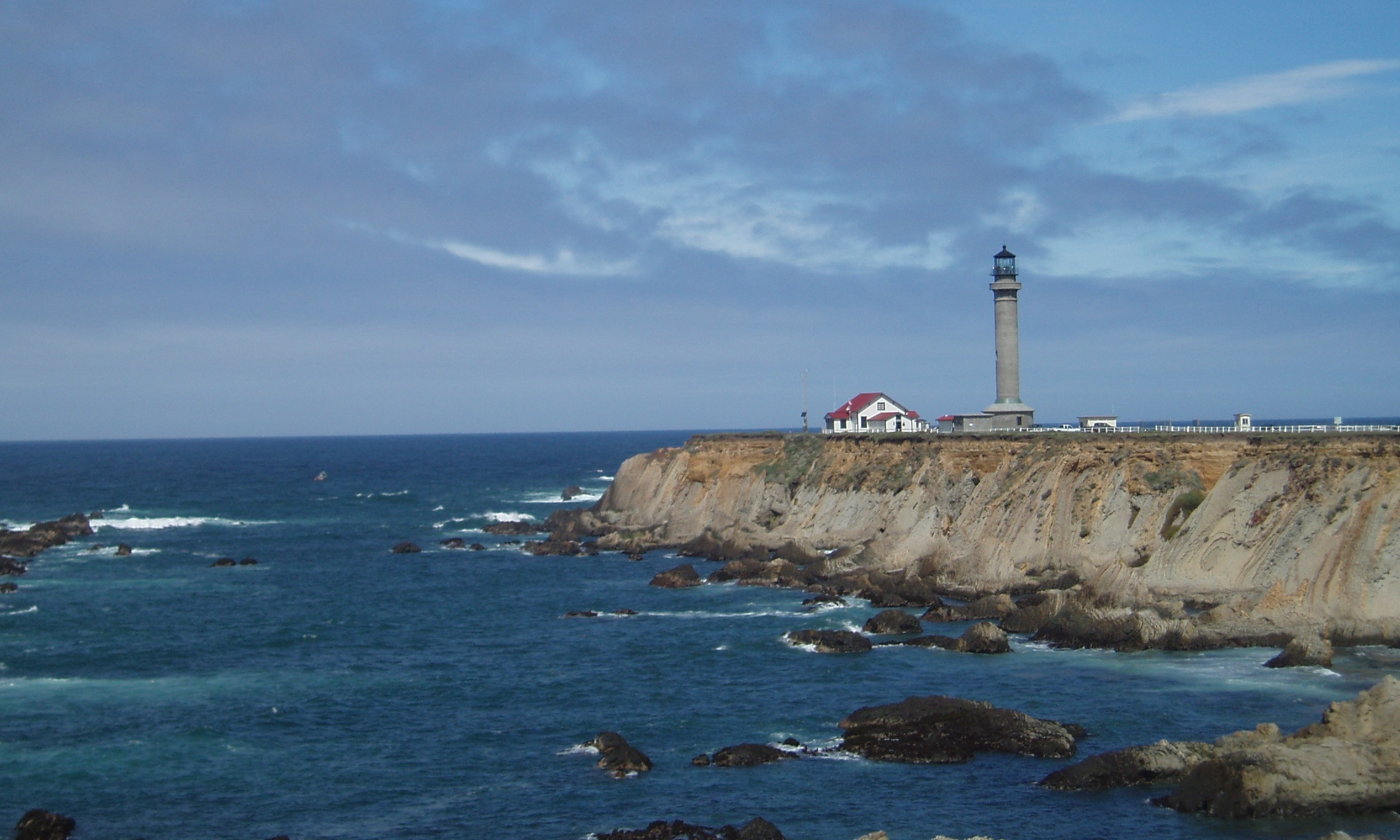
- Point Arena Light
- Location: Point Arena, California, U.S.

Sea Lion Cove State Marine Conservation Area (SMCA) is a marine protected area that lies onshore, just south of Point Arena in Mendocino County on California’s north central coast. The marine protected area covers 0.22 square miles (0.57 km^{2}). Sea Lion Cove SMCA prohibits the commercial and recreational take of invertebrates, algae and other plants, but allows the take of all other species.

== History ==
Sea Lion Cove SMCA is one of 22 marine protected areas adopted by the California Department of Fish and Game in August 2009, during the second phase of the Marine Life Protection Act Initiative. The MLPAI is a collaborative public process to create a statewide network of protected areas along California's coastline.

The north central coast's new marine protected areas were designed by local divers, fishermen, conservationists and scientists who comprised the North Central Coast Regional Stakeholder Group. Their job was to design a network of protected areas that would preserve sensitive sea life and habitats while enhancing recreation, study and education opportunities.

The north central coast marine protected areas took effect May 1, 2010.

== Geography and natural features ==
Sea Lion Cove SMCA is a marine protected area that lies onshore, just south of Point Arena in Mendocino County on California's north central coast. This marine protected area adjoins the Point Arena State Marine Reserve & Point Arena State Marine Conservation Area at its southern boundary.

Point Arena is a peninsula that extends ½ mile into the Pacific Ocean and is the site of the Point Arena Light. Arena Rock lies offshore. Manchester State Beach begins just north of Point Arena and extends for five miles and Schooner Gulch State Beach is three miles south of Point Arena.

The Sea Lion Cove SMCA is bounded by the mean high tide line and straight lines connecting the following points in the order listed:

1. 38°56.40′N 123°43.82′W
2. 38°56.40′N 123°44.00′W
3. 38°55.79′N 123°44.00′W and
4. 38°55.79′N 123°43.74′W.

== Habitat and wildlife ==
Point Arena is one of the major upwelling zones along the West coast of the U.S., which means it is a source of nutrients for fish and wildlife.

An unusually scenic spot, Sea Lion Cove is an abalone nursery that also hosts many other invertebrate communities. Many of these populations have become vulnerable due to the recent opening of public access to this site. The Sea Lion Cove SMCA contributes to the protection of fragile abalone populations and the intertidal ecosystem.

== Recreation and nearby attractions ==
Point Arena and Arena Rock are popular areas for divers. The Point Arena Lighthouse was first built in 1870, then rebuilt after the 1906 earthquake. The tower still holds the original Fresnel Lens, which casts a beam visible to ships 20 nautical miles (37 km) out to sea.

Manchester State Beach is the longest stretch of sandy beach north of Bodega Bay and is great for fishing and for witnessing impressive collections of giant driftwood logs. Visitors to Alder Creek or the Garcia River within Manchester can enjoy pods of harbor porpoises at play, spawning steelhead, and wintering waterfowl.

Schooner Gulch State Beach is three miles (5 km) south of Point Arena, where Schooner Gulch Road intersects State Highway 1. There are two trails, one leading to Schooner Gulch Beach, the other Bowling Ball Beach, and activities include surfing, fishing and picnicking.

Sea Lion Cove SMCA prohibits the commercial and recreational take of invertebrates, algae and other plants, but allows the take of all other species. California's marine protected areas encourage recreational and educational uses of the ocean. Activities such as kayaking, diving, snorkeling, and swimming are allowed unless otherwise restricted.

== Scientific monitoring ==
As specified by the Marine Life Protection Act, select marine protected areas along California's central coast are being monitored by scientists to track their effectiveness and learn more about ocean health. Similar studies in marine protected areas located off of the Santa Barbara Channel Islands have already detected gradual improvements in fish size and number.
