= Manchester, California =

Manchester
- Census-designated place
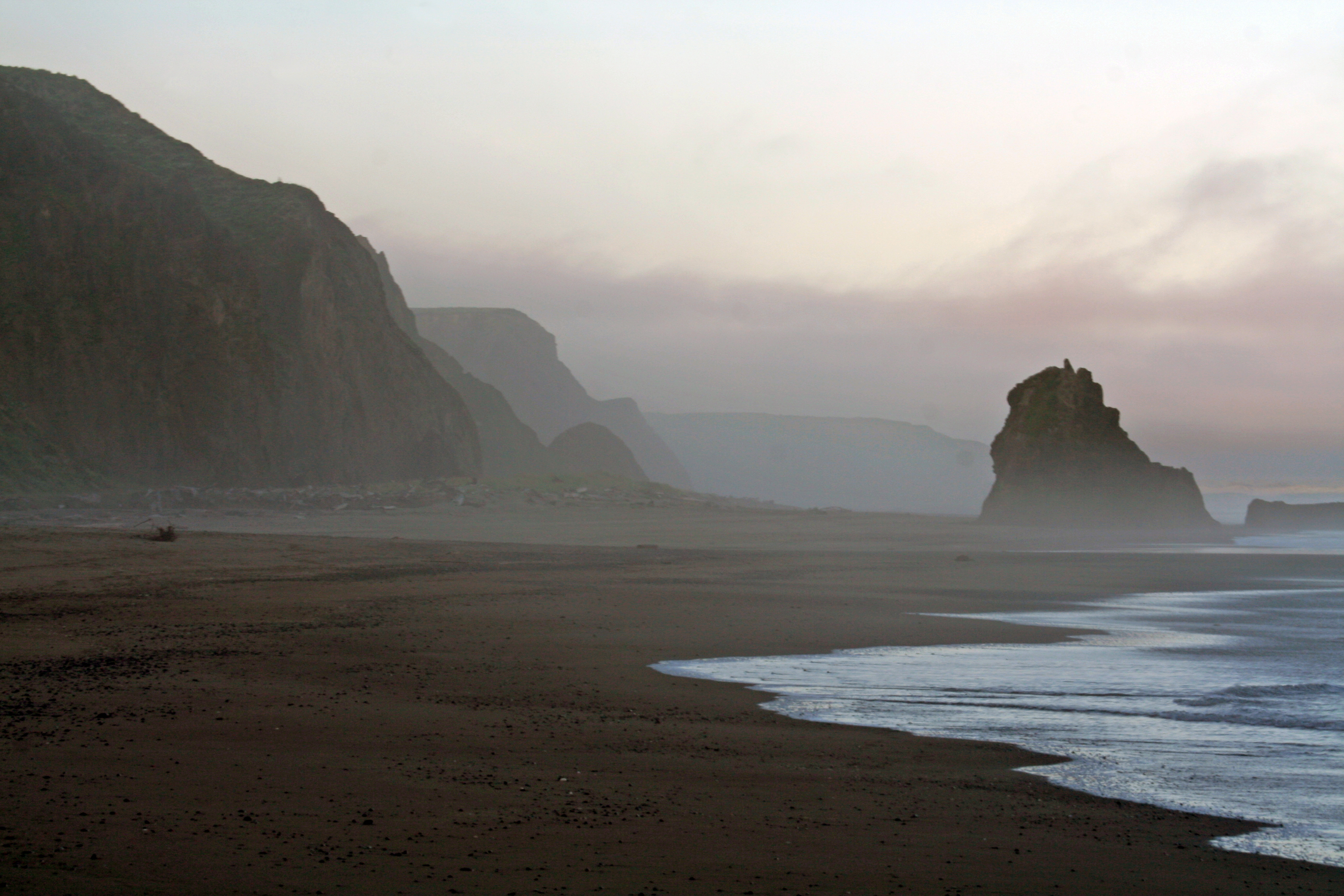

- Location within California Location within the United States
- Coordinates: 38°58′13″N 123°41′17″W
- Country: United States
- State: California
- County: Mendocino

Area
  - Total: 2.618 sq mi (6.78 km^{2})
  - Land: 2.618 sq mi (6.78 km^{2})
  - Water: 0 sq mi (0 km^{2}) 0%
- Elevation: 85 ft (26 m)

Population (2020)
  - Total: 159
  - Density: 60.7/sq mi (23.4/km^{2})
- Time zone: UTC-8 (Pacific (PST))
  - Summer (DST): UTC-7 (PDT)
- ZIP Code: 95459
- Area code: 707
- GNIS feature IDs: 1659043; 2628754

Manchester is a census-designated place in Mendocino County, California, United States. It is located 5 miles (8 km) north of Point Arena at an elevation of 85 feet (26 m). The population was 159 at the 2020 census, down from 195 in 2010.

== History ==
The Manchester post office opened in 1871, closed in 1876, and reopened in 1877. The place was named after Manchester, England, an early settler's former home.

== Geography ==
Manchester is in southwestern Mendocino County along California State Route 1 and 1.5 miles (2.4 km) inland from the Pacific Ocean. Route 1 leads north 29 miles (47 km) to Mendocino and south through Point Arena, 67 miles (108 km) to Bodega Bay.

According to the United States Census Bureau, the CDP covers an area of 2.6 square miles (6.7 km^{2}), all land. It is bordered to the west by Manchester State Park.

=== Climate ===
The region experiences warm (but not hot) and dry summers, with no average monthly temperatures above 71.6 °F (22.0 °C). According to the Köppen Climate Classification system, Manchester has a warm-summer Mediterranean climate, abbreviated Csb on climate maps.

== Demographics ==
Historical population
Census	Pop.	Note	%±
2010	195		—
2020	159		−18.5%
U.S. Decennial Census; 1850–1870 1880-1890; 1900 1910 1920; 1930 1940 1950; 1960 1970 1980; 1990 2000 2010

Manchester first appeared as a census designated place in the 2010 U.S. census.

The 2020 United States census reported that Manchester had a population of 159. The population density was 60.7 inhabitants per square mile (23.4/km^{2}). The racial makeup of Manchester was 101 (63.5%) White, 0 (0.0%) African American, 4 (2.5%) Native American, 1 (0.6%) Asian, 1 (0.6%) Pacific Islander, 13 (8.2%) from other races, and 39 (24.5%) from two or more races. Hispanic or Latino of any race were 44 persons (27.7%).

The whole population lived in households. There were 67 households, out of which 14 (20.9%) had children under the age of 18 living in them, 27 (40.3%) were married-couple households, 8 (11.9%) were cohabiting couple households, 26 (38.8%) had a female householder with no partner present, and 6 (9.0%) had a male householder with no partner present. 21 households (31.3%) were one person, and 8 (11.9%) were one person aged 65 or older. The average household size was 2.37. There were 37 families (55.2% of all households).

The age distribution was 34 people (21.4%) under the age of 18, 10 people (6.3%) aged 18 to 24, 37 people (23.3%) aged 25 to 44, 40 people (25.2%) aged 45 to 64, and 38 people (23.9%) who were 65 years of age or older. The median age was 43.5 years. There were 83 males and 76 females.

There were 88 housing units at an average density of 33.6 units per square mile (13.0 units/km^{2}), of which 67 (76.1%) were occupied. Of these, 55 (82.1%) were owner-occupied, and 12 (17.9%) were occupied by renters.

== Politics ==
In the state legislature, Manchester is in the 2nd senatorial district, represented by Democrat Mike McGuire, and the 2nd Assembly district, represented by Democrat Chris Rogers.

Federally, Manchester is in California's 2nd congressional district, represented by Democrat Jared Huffman.
