= Schooner Gulch State Beach =

State park in California, United States

Coordinates: 38°52′05″N 123°39′19″W

- Beach
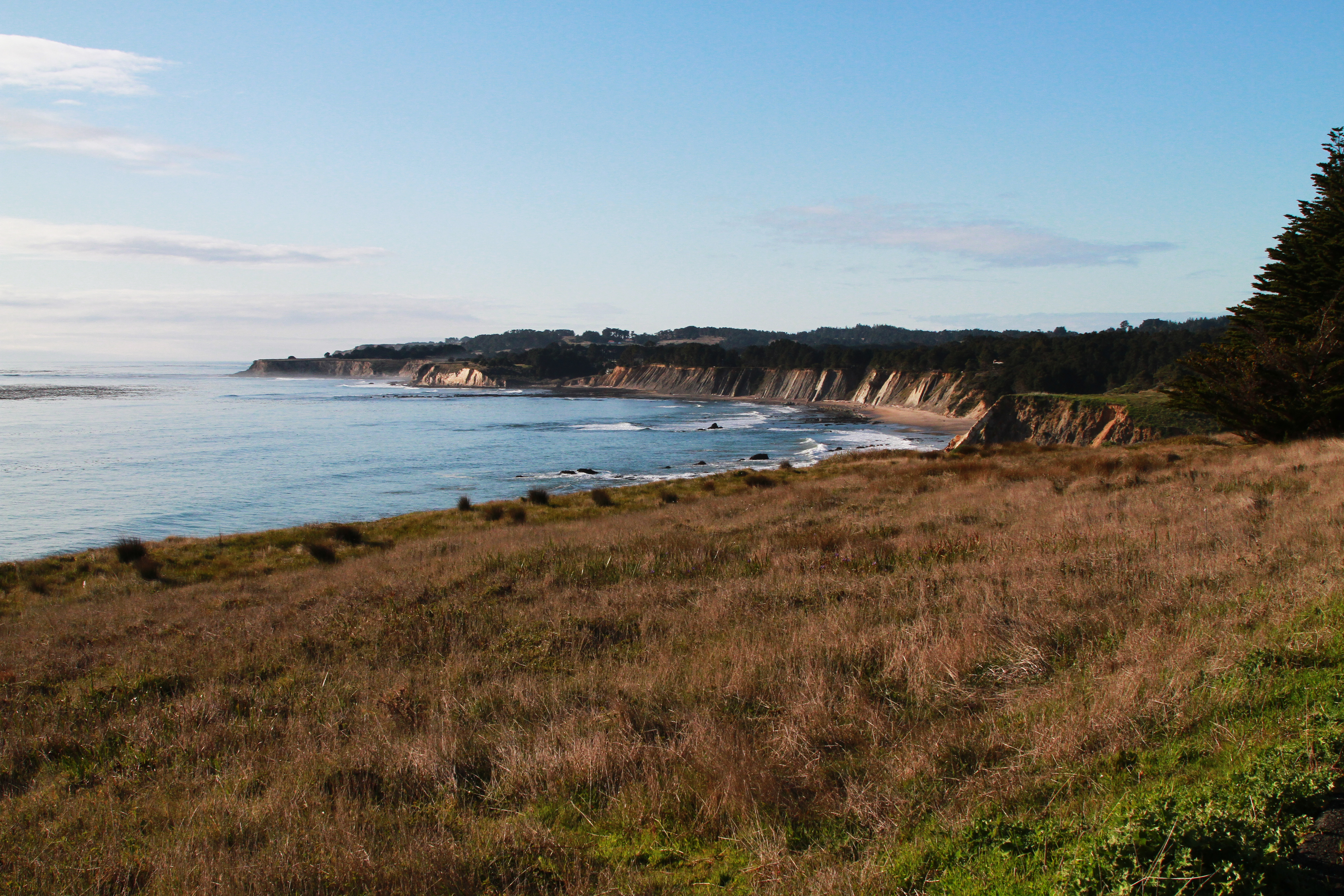
- View of the beach
- Location: Mendocino County, California

Dimensions
  - Length: <1 mile
- Access: CA-1

Schooner Gulch State Beach is a public beach located in Mendocino County, California. It is located approximately 50 miles northwest of Santa Rosa. The park is famous for Bowling Ball Beach, where visitors can view natural spherical sandstone concretions at low tide. Visitors to the beach come to surf, fish, and picnic. Hiking is also a very popular activity at this beach, and there are multiple trails along the coast.

The long-abandoned settlement of Schooner Gulch, California was located in the area, but no trace remains within the park.

== Marine Protected Areas ==
The Point Arena State Marine Reserve & Point Arena State Marine Conservation Area are two marine protected areas that extend offshore from Point Arena, which is three miles north of Schooner Gulch State Beach. Sea Lion Cove State Marine Conservation Area and Saunders Reef State Marine Conservation Area lie south of Point Arena. Like underwater parks, these marine protected areas help conserve ocean wildlife and marine ecosystems.

== See also ==
- List of beaches in California
- List of California state parks
