= Point Arena, California =

City in California, United States

Point Arena
- City
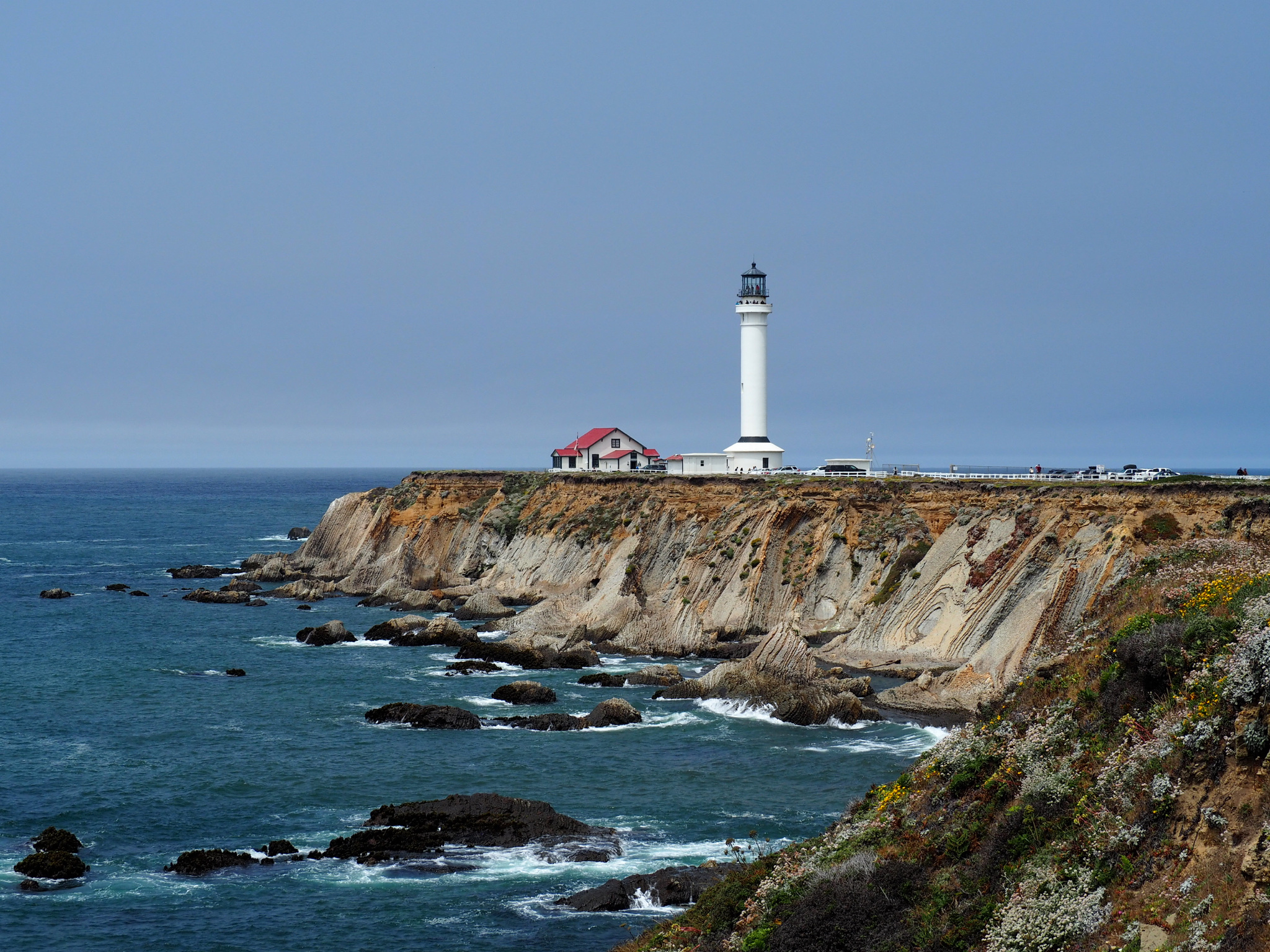
- Point Arena and its lighthouse
- Interactive map of Point Arena
- Location within California Location within the United States
- Coordinates: 38°54′32″N 123°41′35″W
- Country: United States
- State: California
- County: Mendocino
- Incorporated: July 11, 1908

Government
  - Type: Council–manager
  - Mayor: Anna Dobbins

Area
  - Total: 1.36 sq mi (3.5 km^{2})
  - Land: 1.36 sq mi (3.5 km^{2})
  - Water: 0.00 sq mi (0 km^{2}) 0%
- Elevation: 118 ft (36 m)

Population (2020)
  - Total: 460
  - Density: 337/sq mi (130/km^{2})
- Time zone: UTC-8 (PST)
  - Summer (DST): UTC-7 (PDT)
- ZIP Code: 95468
- Area code(s): 707, 369
- FIPS code: 06-57876
- GNIS feature ID: 1659411
- Website: pointarena.ca.gov

Point Arena, formerly known as Punta Arena (Spanish for "Sandy Point"), is a small coastal city in Mendocino County, California, United States. Point Arena is located 32 miles (51 km) west of Hopland, at an elevation of 118 feet (36 m). The population was 460 at the 2020 census, making it one of the smallest incorporated cities in the state.

Its main street is part of State Route 1, California's coastal artery. Along with a number of other Mendocino County coastal communities, Point Arena was associated with the hippie and subsequent counterculture groups. The economy is largely geared toward serving the summertime tourist industry. The city is near the headquarters of the tribal lands of the Manchester Band of Pomo Indians of the Manchester Rancheria and adjacent to the recently formed Point Arena-Stornetta Public Lands National Monument. Hiking trails with coastal prairie and ocean views can be accessed from Point Arena City Hall. At Arena Cove Historic District and pier, huge oceanfront bluffs show the power of the interface of tectonic plates.

== History ==
The first European to record Point Arena was Spaniard Bartolomé Ferrer in 1543, who named it Cabo de Fortunas ("cape of fortunes"). The cape was renamed to Punta Delgado (narrow point) in 1775 by lieutenant Juan Francisco de la Bodega y Quadra (commander of the schooner Sonora), part of a royal expedition chartered by the government of Mexico to map the north coast of Alta California. Later the point, and the small harbor town south of it, were called Barra de Arena (i.e. sandbar) and finally Punta Arena (literally "sand point").

The Punta Arena post office opened in 1858, and was renamed Point Arena in 1889. The first store at Point Arena opened in 1859. Point Arena incorporated in 1908.

In 1886, Nellie Welch, an 11-year-old girl, was appointed lead operator and had full charge of the telegraph office in Point Arena. Operators like Western Union often hired women because they were cheaper labor than the men.

The Point Arena Cable Station is located in nearby Manchester. Built in 1956 by AT&T Corporation, the cable station serves as the eastern terminus of several undersea cables, including the Japan-US Cable Network and connections to Hawaii and Canada. In 2002, AT&T applied for a permit from the EPA to connect an existing optical fiber conduit to the cable station, since further construction would cause incidental damage to the habitat of the endangered Point Arena mountain beaver.

== Geography ==
The city of Point Arena is located in southwestern Mendocino County at 38°54′32″N 123°41′35″W. Its ZIP Code is 95468. According to the United States Census Bureau, the city has a total area of 1.4 square miles (3.6 km^{2}), all land.

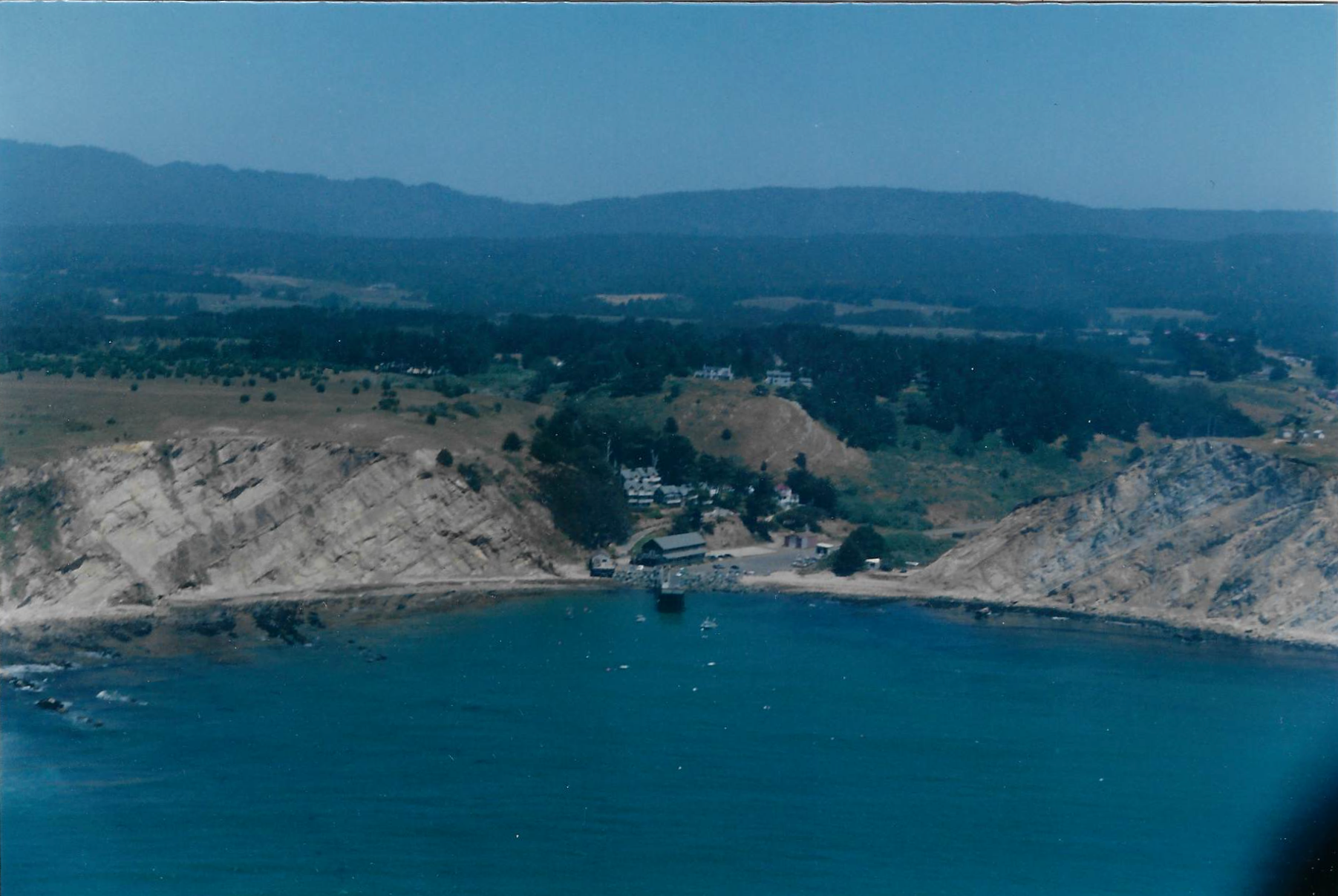
This photograph of Arena Cove was taken from a small plane flying along the coast.

The city is built around Arena Cove, a small natural harbor, and is approximately 1.5 miles (2.4 km) south of the actual Point Arena, a narrow peninsula jutting 0.3 miles (0.48 km) into the Pacific Ocean. This is the location of the Point Arena Light, at 115 feet (35 m) the tallest lighthouse on the west coast of the United States. The lighthouse is the closest location on the mainland (excluding Alaska) to Honolulu, Hawaii, at a distance of 2,353 miles (3,787 km).

Via California State Route 1, Point Arena is 5 miles (8 km) south of Manchester and 10 miles (16 km) north of Anchor Bay. Boonville is 29 miles (47 km) to the east across the California Coast Ranges via Mountain View Road, and Ukiah, the Mendocino county seat, is 50 miles (80 km) to the east.

== Climate ==
Point Arena has cool, wet winters and mild, relatively dry summers. According to the Köppen climate classification system, it has a cool-summer Mediterranean climate. The average January temperatures are a maximum of 56.4 °F (13.6 °C) and a minimum of 40.2 °F (4.6 °C). The average July temperatures are a maximum of 65.2 °F (18.4 °C) and a minimum of 49.9 °F (9.9 °C). There are an average of only 0.3 days with highs of 90 °F (32 °C) or higher and an average of 14.1 days with lows of 32 °F (0 °C) or lower. The record high temperature was 95 °F (35 °C) on August 12, 1947, and September 28, 1966. The record low temperature was 22 °F (−6 °C) on January 21, 1962.

Average annual precipitation is 41.28 inches (1,049 mm). There are an average of 83 days with measurable precipitation. The wettest year was 1983 with 83.34 inches (2,117 mm) and the driest year was 1976 with 21.23 inches (539 mm). The most precipitation in one month was 21.99 inches (559 mm). The most precipitation in 24 hours was 5.09 inches (129 mm) on January 24, 1944.

Climate data for Point Arena
Month	Jan	Feb	Mar	Apr	May	Jun	Jul	Aug	Sep	Oct	Nov	Dec	Year
Record high °F (°C)	76 (24)	80 (27)	79 (26)	83 (28)	83 (28)	85 (29)	89 (32)	95 (35)	90 (32)	92 (33)	79 (26)	74 (23)	95 (35)
Mean daily maximum °F (°C)	56.4 (13.6)	57.2 (14.0)	57.8 (14.3)	59.1 (15.1)	61.1 (16.2)	63.0 (17.2)	65.2 (18.4)	65.7 (18.7)	66.7 (19.3)	64.9 (18.3)	60.7 (15.9)	57.2 (14.0)	61.3 (16.3)
Mean daily minimum °F (°C)	40.2 (4.6)	42.0 (5.6)	42.4 (5.8)	43.1 (6.2)	46.0 (7.8)	48.6 (9.2)	49.9 (9.9)	50.5 (10.3)	49.8 (9.9)	47.2 (8.4)	43.3 (6.3)	41.4 (5.2)	45.4 (7.4)
Record low °F (°C)	22 (−6)	25 (−4)	26 (−3)	28 (−2)	30 (−1)	34 (1)	38 (3)	38 (3)	33 (1)	28 (−2)	25 (−4)	24 (−4)	22 (−6)
Average precipitation inches (mm)	7.73 (196)	6.89 (175)	5.55 (141)	2.94 (75)	0.93 (24)	0.29 (7.4)	0.12 (3.0)	0.3 (7.6)	0.72 (18)	2.91 (74)	5.65 (144)	7.26 (184)	41.28 (1,049)
Average precipitation days	12	12	12	7	5	2	1	1	3	6	10	12	83

== Geology ==
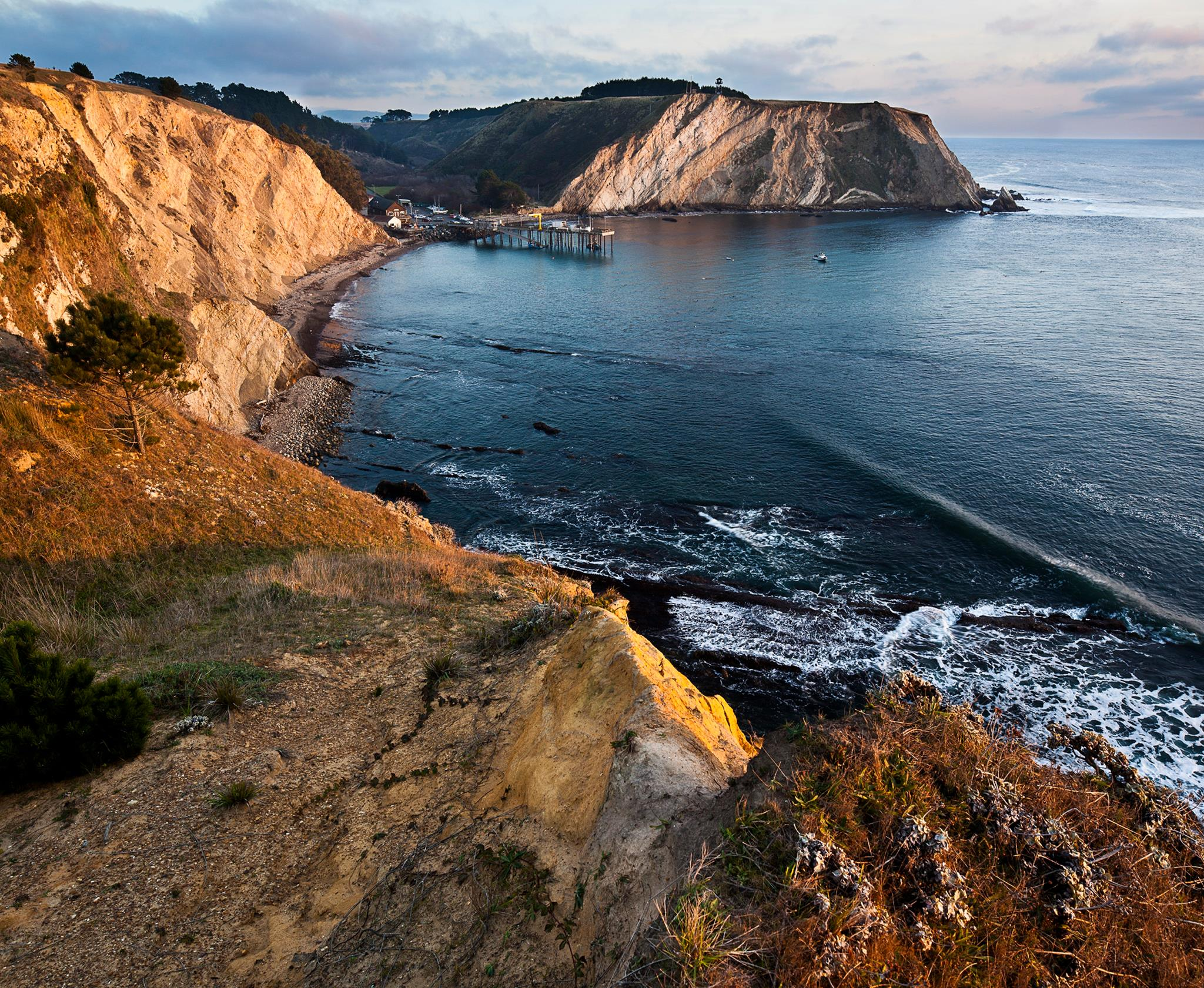
Point Arena pier and cove from Stornetta Public Lands

The San Andreas Fault runs out to sea at Alder Creek near Manchester, about 6 miles (10 km) north of Point Arena. The 1906 San Francisco earthquake was strongly felt at Point Arena and irreparably damaged the Point Arena Lighthouse, which was then torn down and rebuilt.

== Ecology ==
A variety of fauna and flora occur in the Point Arena area which is a range demarcation for occurrence of some species. For example, the California giant salamander occurs to the south while the Pacific giant salamander occurs to the north. It is also the type locality for the Point Arena mountain beaver, Aplodontia rufa nigra, which is federally listed under the Endangered Species Act of 1973 as endangered, and is considered a mammalian species of special concern by the State of California. According to the United States Fish and Wildlife Service, the habitat for this subspecies of mountain beaver lies only within a 24 sq mi (62 km^{2}) area around Point Arena. The biggest threat to the PAMB is loss of habitat, and it was officially listed as an endangered species on December 12, 1991. Much local folklore revolves around this mysterious creature.

The Point Arena State Marine Reserve & Point Arena State Marine Conservation Area are two marine protected areas that extend offshore from Point Arena. Sea Lion Cove State Marine Conservation Area and Saunders Reef State Marine Conservation Area lie south of Point Arena. Like underwater parks, these marine protected areas help conserve ocean wildlife and marine ecosystems.

Sound levels in Point Arena are relatively quiet, with many locations at night-time dominated by natural sounds, such as those of the surf. The firm of Earth Metrics Inc., who prepared the Noise Element of the Point Arena General Plan, found that, even considering the presence of logging trucks on main city streets, composite sound levels rarely exceed 55 L_{eq}. The maximum acceptable sound level specified in that General Plan Element is 60 L_{eq} for residential areas.

== Demographics ==
Historical population
Census	Pop.	Note	%±
1880	198		—
1890	709		258.1%
1910	497		—
1920	394		−20.7%
1930	385		−2.3%
1940	374		−2.9%
1950	372		−0.5%
1960	596		60.2%
1970	424		−28.9%
1980	425		0.2%
1990	407		−4.2%
2000	474		16.5%
2010	449		−5.3%
2020	460		2.4%
U.S. Decennial Census

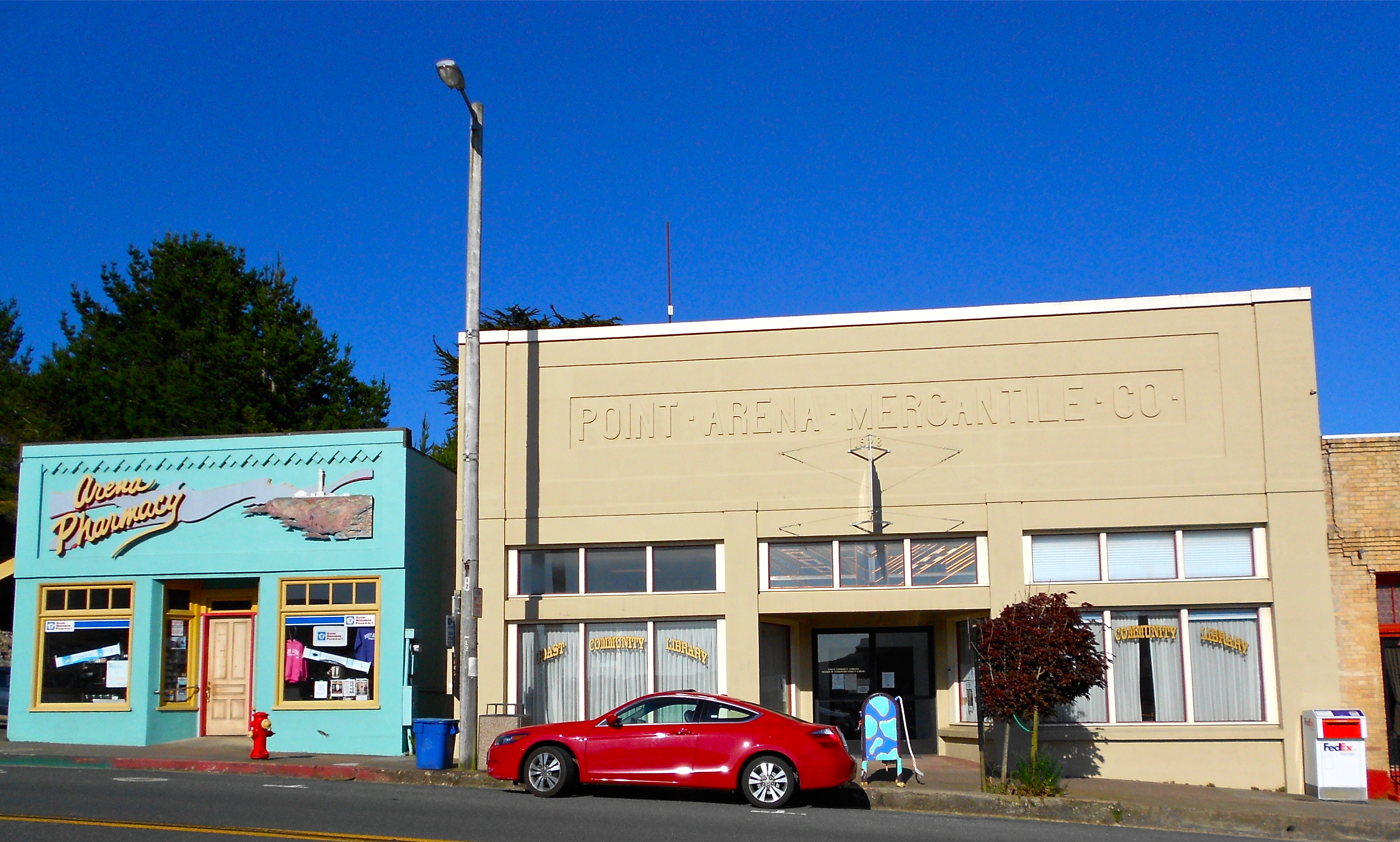
Downtown and the Point Arena Mercantile, 2012

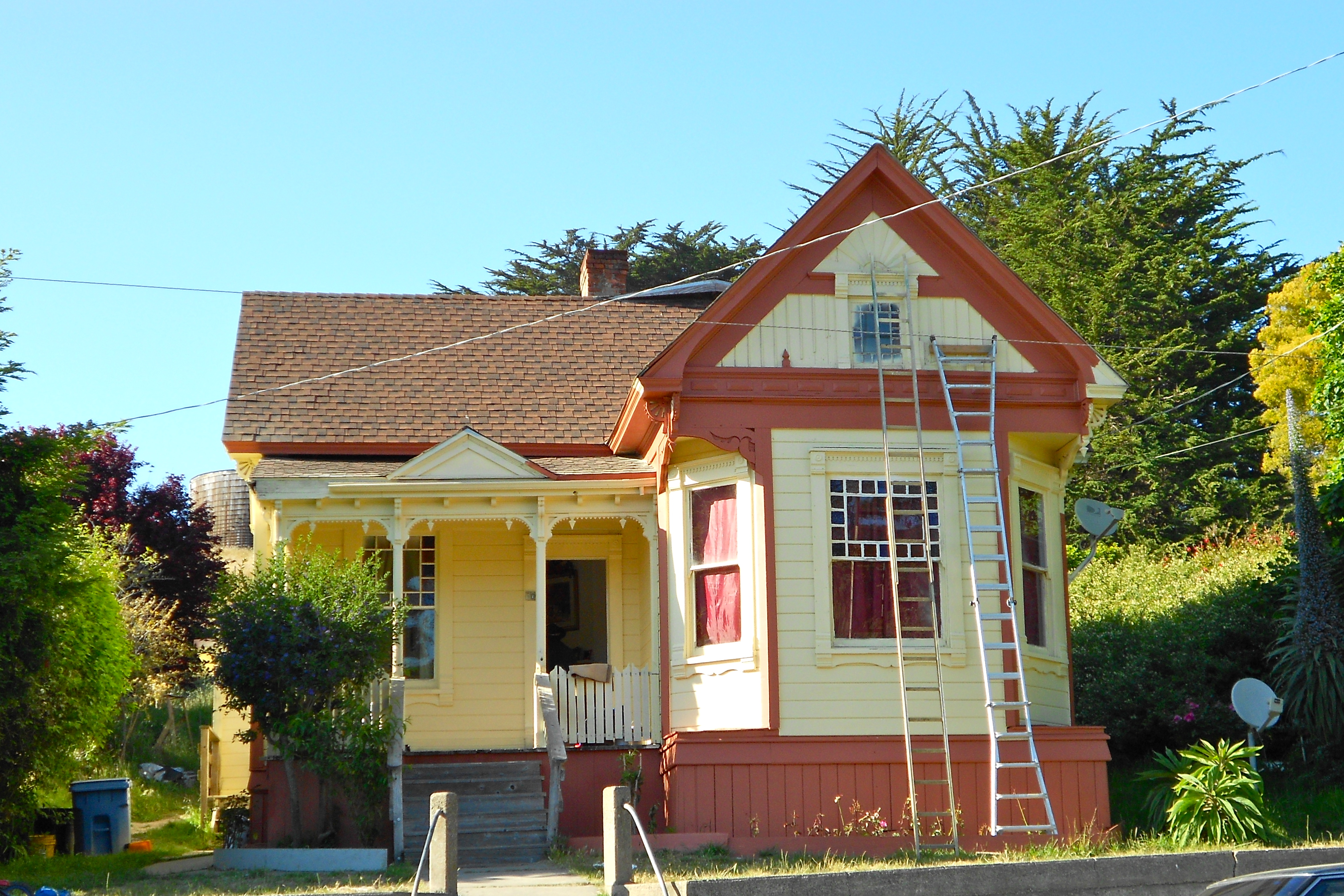
Groshen House, Point Arena 2012

=== 2020 ===
The 2020 United States census reported that Point Arena had a population of 460. The population density was 337.0 inhabitants per square mile (130.1/km^{2}). The racial makeup of Point Arena was 281 (61.1%) White, 2 (0.4%) African American, 34 (7.4%) Native American, 0 (0.0%) Asian, 1 (0.2%) Pacific Islander, 76 (16.5%) from other races, and 66 (14.3%) from two or more races. Hispanic or Latino of any race were 141 persons (30.7%).

The whole population lived in households. There were 196 households, out of which 55 (28.1%) had children under the age of 18 living in them, 56 (28.6%) were married-couple households, 25 (12.8%) were cohabiting couple households, 55 (28.1%) had a female householder with no partner present, and 60 (30.6%) had a male householder with no partner present. 77 households (39.3%) were one person, and 42 (21.4%) were one person aged 65 or older. The average household size was 2.35. There were 98 families (50.0% of all households).

The age distribution was 100 people (21.7%) under the age of 18, 35 people (7.6%) aged 18 to 24, 92 people (20.0%) aged 25 to 44, 129 people (28.0%) aged 45 to 64, and 104 people (22.6%) who were 65 years of age or older. The median age was 45.3 years. For every 100 females, there were 103.5 males.

There were 225 housing units at an average density of 164.8 units per square mile (63.6 units/km^{2}), of which 196 (87.1%) were occupied. Of these, 83 (42.3%) were owner-occupied, and 113 (57.7%) were occupied by renters.

=== 2010 ===
At the 2010 census Point Arena had a population of 449. The population density was 332.6 inhabitants per square mile (128.4/km^{2}). The racial makeup of Point Arena was 305 (67.9%) White, 2 (0.4%) African American, 1 (0.2%) Native American, 0 (0.0%) Asian, 0 (0.0%) Pacific Islander, 118 (26.3%) from other races, and 23 (5.1%) from two or more races. Hispanic or Latino of any race were 150 people (33.4%).

The whole population lived in households, no one lived in non-institutionalized group quarters and no one was institutionalized.

There were 192 households, 57 (29.7%) had children under the age of 18 living in them, 62 (32.3%) were opposite-sex married couples living together, 25 (13.0%) had a female householder with no husband present, 13 (6.8%) had a male householder with no wife present. There were 20 (10.4%) unmarried opposite-sex partnerships, and 3 (1.6%) same-sex married couples or partnerships. 71 households (37.0%) were one person and 28 (14.6%) had someone living alone who was 65 or older. The average household size was 2.34. There were 100 families (52.1% of households); the average family size was 3.08.

The age distribution was 112 people (24.9%) under the age of 18, 31 people (6.9%) aged 18 to 24, 116 people (25.8%) aged 25 to 44, 132 people (29.4%) aged 45 to 64, and 58 people (12.9%) who were 65 or older. The median age was 40.0 years. For every 100 females, there were 109.8 males. For every 100 females age 18 and over, there were 103.0 males.

There were 225 housing units at an average density of 166.7 per square mile, of the occupied units 87 (45.3%) were owner-occupied and 105 (54.7%) were rented. The homeowner vacancy rate was 4.4%; the rental vacancy rate was 8.7%. 189 people (42.1% of the population) lived in owner-occupied housing units and 260 people (57.9%) lived in rental housing units.

=== 2000 ===
At the 2000 census, the median income for a household in the city was $27,083, and the median family income was $32,885. Males had a median income of $21,042 versus $15,000 for females. The per capita income for the city was $12,591. About 24.1% of families and 26.0% of the population were below the poverty line, including 36.0% of those under age 18 and 4.5% of those age 65 or over.

== Education ==
The city has three high schools, namely Point Arena High School, South Coast Continuation High School, and the Pacific Community Charter High School. Students are allowed to cross-enroll and take courses at both the Point Arena High and Charter High schools, granting Point Arena students access to a broad choice of curriculum. Several feeder schools bring students through grammar school before sending them to Point Arena High School or the Charter School, meaning that the schools draw from a large pool of students in southern Mendocino and northern Sonoma counties.

== Government ==
Point Arena is governed by an elected five-member city council, which includes the mayor.

In the state legislature, Point Arena is in the 2nd senatorial district, represented by Democrat Mike McGuire, and the 2nd Assembly district, represented by Democrat Chris Rogers.

Federally, Point Arena is in California's 2nd congressional district, represented by Democrat Jared Huffman.

== See also ==
- Point Arena Hot Springs
