= Point Arena Light =

Lighthouse in California, United States

- Point Arena Light, 2018
- Location: Two mi (3.2 km) north of Point Arena, California, United States
- Coordinates: 38°57′17.1″N 123°44′26.2″W

Tower
- Constructed: 1870 (first)
- Foundation: concrete
- Construction: reinforced concrete
- Automated: 1977
- Height: 115 ft (35 m)
- Shape: cylindrical tower with balcony and lantern
- Markings: white tower, black lantern
- Operator: Point Arena Lighthouse Keepers, Inc.
- Heritage: National Register of Historic Places listed place, California Historical Landmark

Light
- First lit: 1908 (current)
- Focal height: 155 ft (47 m)
- Lens: First order rotating Fresnel lens mercury floated (original), DCB-224 (current)
- Range: 25 nmi (46 km; 29 mi)
- Characteristic: Fl W 15s.
- Point Arena Light Station
- U.S. National Register of Historic Places
- U.S. Historic district
- California Historical Landmark
- Nearest city: Point Arena, California
- Area: 6 acres (2.4 ha)
- Built: 1908
- Built by: Concrete Chimney Co.
- Architectural style: Light Station
- MPS: Point Arena MPS
- NRHP reference No.: 90002189
- CHISL No.: 1035
- Added to NRHP: July 16, 1991

Point Arena Light is a lighthouse in Mendocino County, California, United States, two miles (3 km) north of Point Arena, California. It is approximately 130 mi (210 km) north of San Francisco, in the Fort Point Group of lighthouses. The lighthouse features a small museum and gift shop. Guided tours of the light station as well as self-guided tours of the grounds are available daily.

== Geography ==
The first European to record Point Arena was Spaniard Bartolomé Ferrer in 1543, who named it Cabo de Fortunas ("cape of fortunes"). in 1775, lieutenant Juan Francisco de la Bodega y Quadra (commander of the schooner Sonora) renamed the cape Punta Delgado ("narrow point") during a royal expedition chartered by the Viceroyalty of New Spain to map the north coast of Alta California. Later the point and the small harbor town south of it were called Barra de Arena ("sandbar") and finally Point Arena ("sand point"). Point Arena is a narrow peninsula jutting about 1/2 mile (800 m) into the Pacific Ocean. This sandbar creates a natural hazard to navigation, hence the need for a lighthouse and fog signal.

== The first lighthouse ==
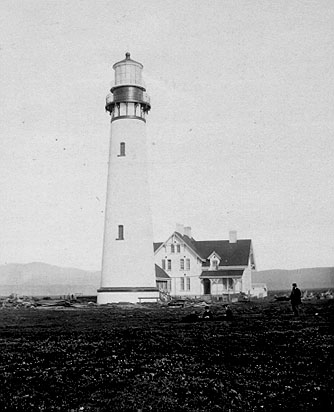
The original tower, damaged by an earthquake in 1906

The original lighthouse at this site was constructed in 1870. The brick-and-mortar tower included ornate iron balcony supports and a large keeper residence with enough space to house several families. In April 1906, the San Francisco earthquake struck the light station. The keeper's residence and lighthouse were damaged so severely that they had to be demolished.

== The rebuilding ==
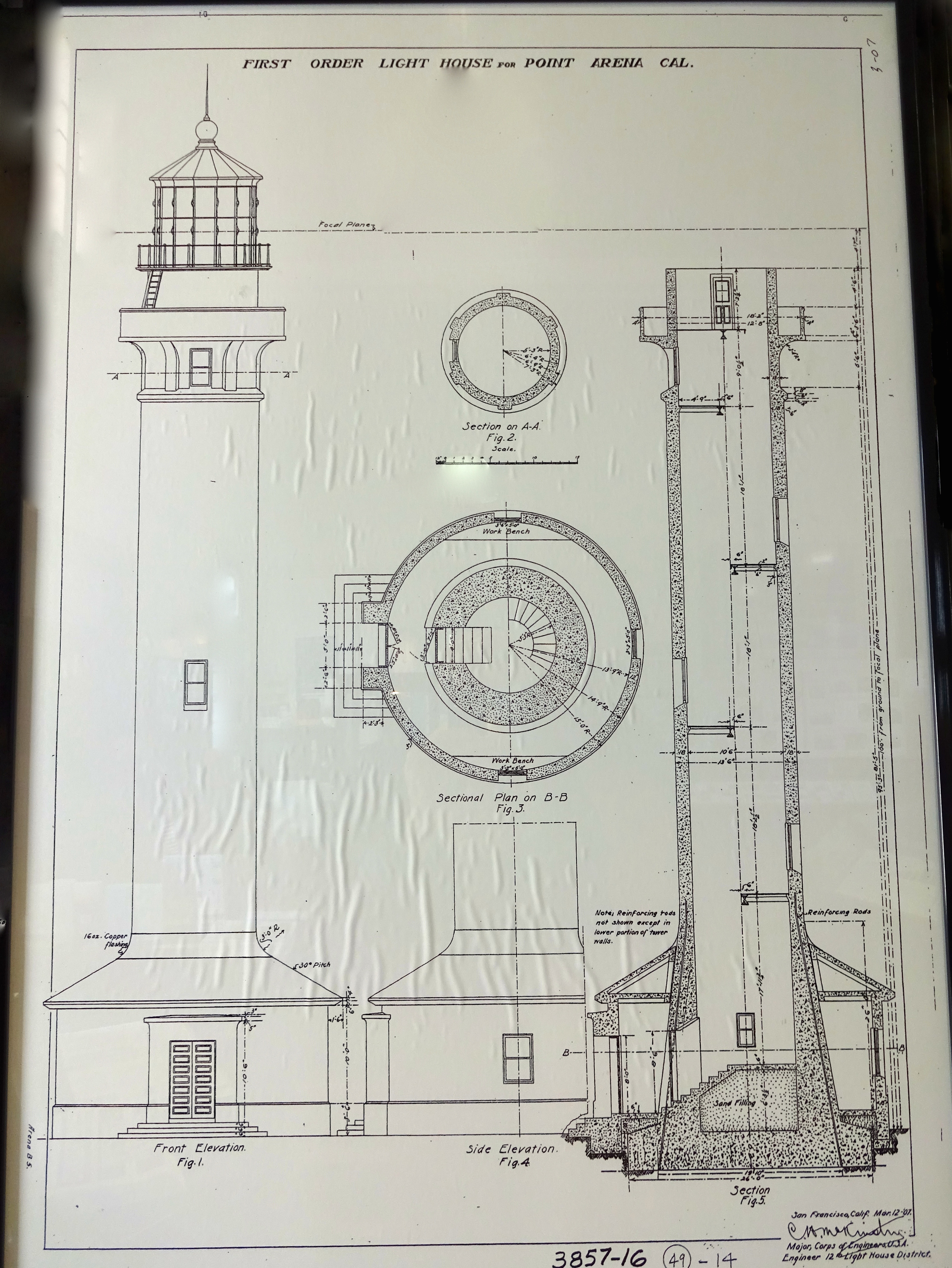
Engineering drawing of Point Arena Lighthouse

The United States Lighthouse Board contracted with a San Francisco-based company to build a new lighthouse on the site and specified that it had to withstand earthquakes. The company chose normally built factory smokestacks, which accounts for the final design for the new Point Arena Lighthouse, featuring steel reinforcement rods encased in concrete. This was the first lighthouse built this way.

The new lighthouse began operation in 1908, nearly 18 months after the quake. It stands 115 ft (35 m) tall, and featured a 1st Order Fresnel Lens, over six feet in diameter and weighing more than six tons. The lens was made up of 258 hand-ground glass prisms, all focused toward three sets of double bullseyes. These bullseyes gave Point Arena Lighthouse its unique "light signature" of two flashes every six seconds. The optics, which held an appraised value of over $3.5 million, were set in solid brass framework and built in France.

== The light ==
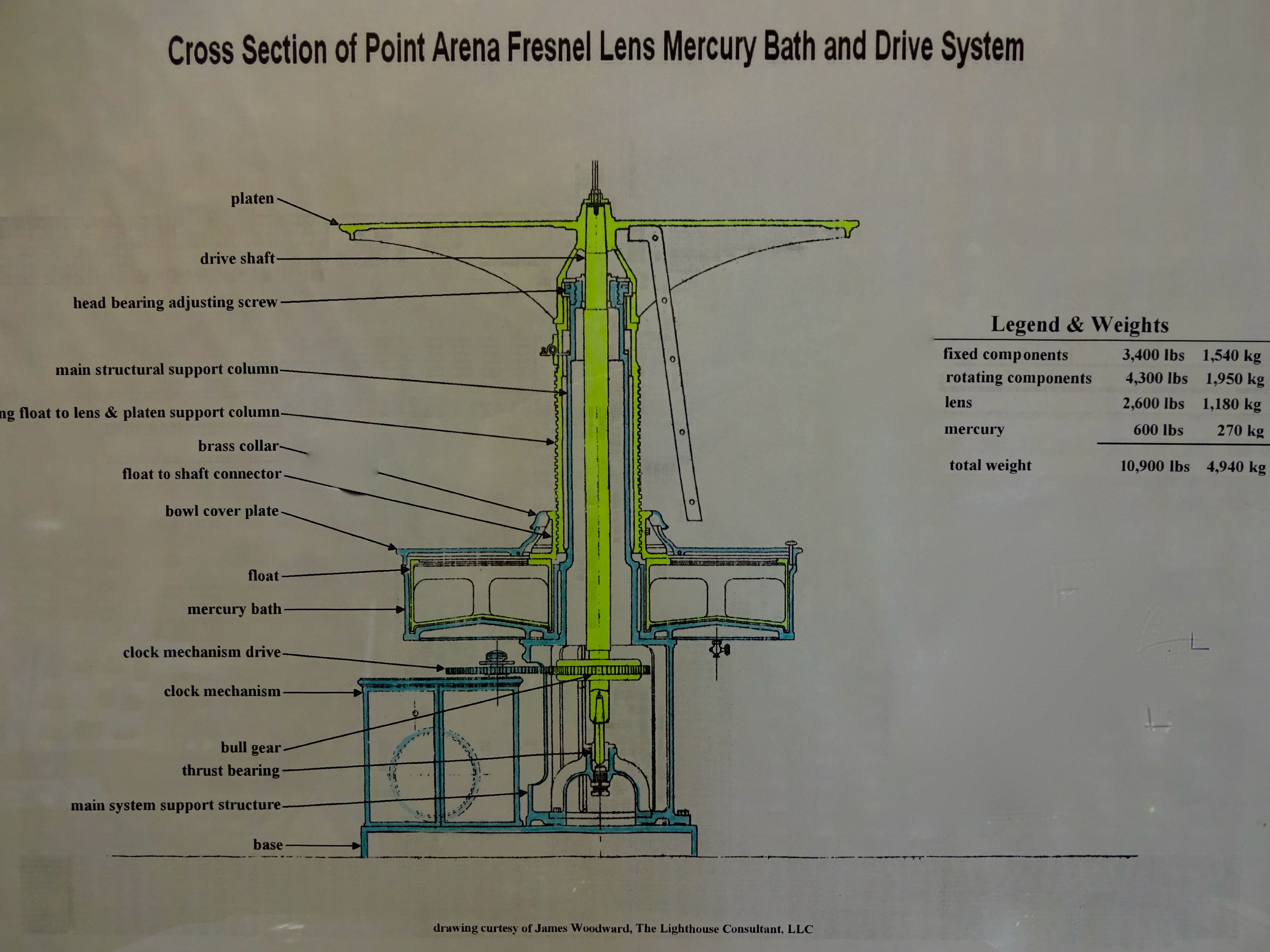
Engineering drawing of device used to turn lighthouse beacon at Point Arena Lighthouse

Before the introduction of electricity, the lens was rotated by a clockwork mechanism. The keepers, or "wickies", hand-cranked a 160-pound weight up the lighthouse's center shaft every 75 minutes to keep the lens turning. Light was produced by a "Funck" hydraulic oil lamp that needed to be refueled every four hours and whose wicks had to be trimmed regularly. Later, two 1,000-watt electric lamps were installed to replace the oil lamp, and a 1/8 horsepower electric motor was installed to replace the clockworks.

== Modernization ==
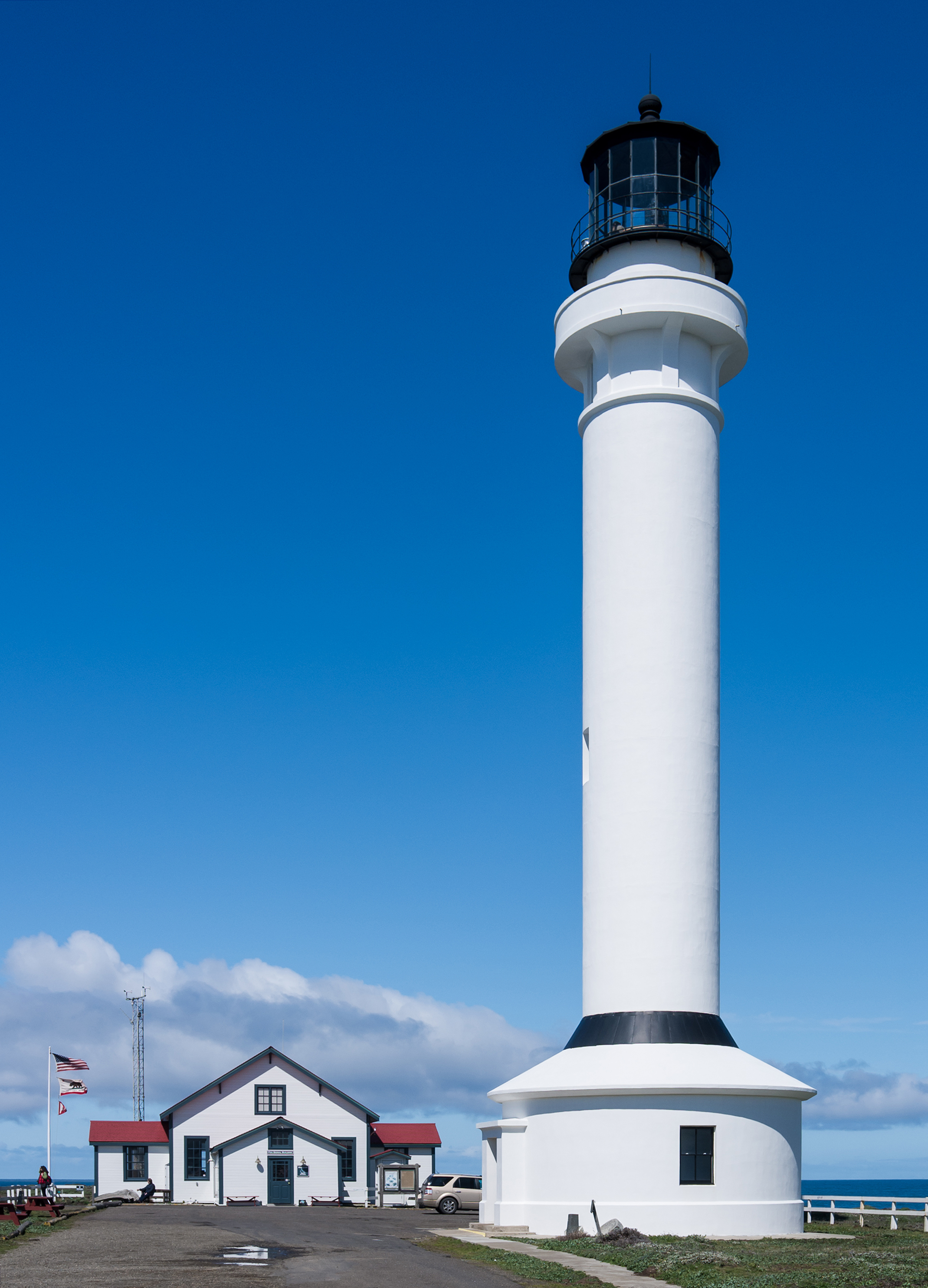
The lighthouse in 2012

In 1978, the station's original fog signal was silenced and a bell buoy was placed nearby. June 1977 brought the installation of an automated aircraft-type beacon on the balcony tower, and the historic 1st Order Fresnel Lens was discontinued. At the time, the lens was the only mercury-floated light still in existence in the Twelfth United States Coast Guard District. The 400-pound aircraft beacon had been replaced by a 40-pound modern rotating light that incorporates the Fresnel principles for the efficient projection of light.

== Reliability ==
A battery-powered emergency system is installed as a backup in the event of a power failure. In addition, a radio beacon, with a 50 mi (80 km) signal that originates from the station, assists mariners. The original oil lamp was visible for approximately 18 mi (29 km), the 1st Order Fresnel Lens for 20 mi (32 km), and the current modern rotating light for 16 mi (26 km).

== Staffing ==
Four men staffed this family station and were provided with quarters as follows: one 4-bedroom unit and three 3-bedroom units. Other buildings are the light tower, paint locker, fuel locker, bosun locker and buildings housing the fire pump, water pumps and JP-5 fueling pumps. The station had a half-ton pickup truck assigned which, among other things, was utilized to transport dependent schoolchildren to school three mi (5 km) from the station.

== Today ==
In 1984, a nonprofit organization called the Point Arena Lighthouse Keepers acquired the light station as part of a 25-year land lease from the Coast Guard and the Department of Transportation. In November 2000, the nonprofit group became the official owners of the property due to its diligent historic preservation and educational efforts. Daily visitation, gift store sales, memberships and the rental of the historic keepers' homes on the property as vacation houses all provide income to the group for ongoing preservation, facility upgrades, and educational endeavors.

The Point Arena Light is California Historical Landmark No. 1035.

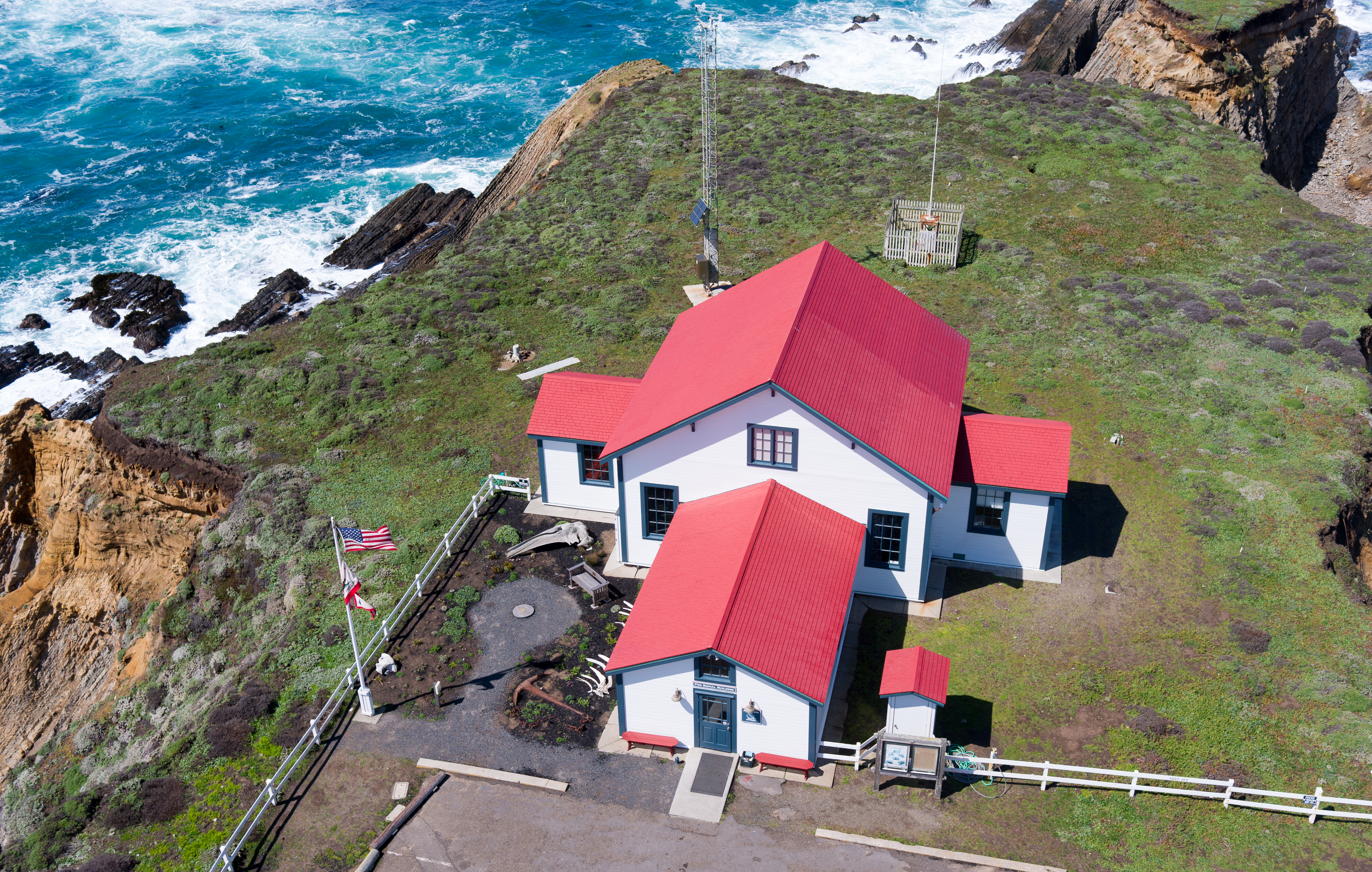
Fog Signal Building at Point Arena Lighthouse

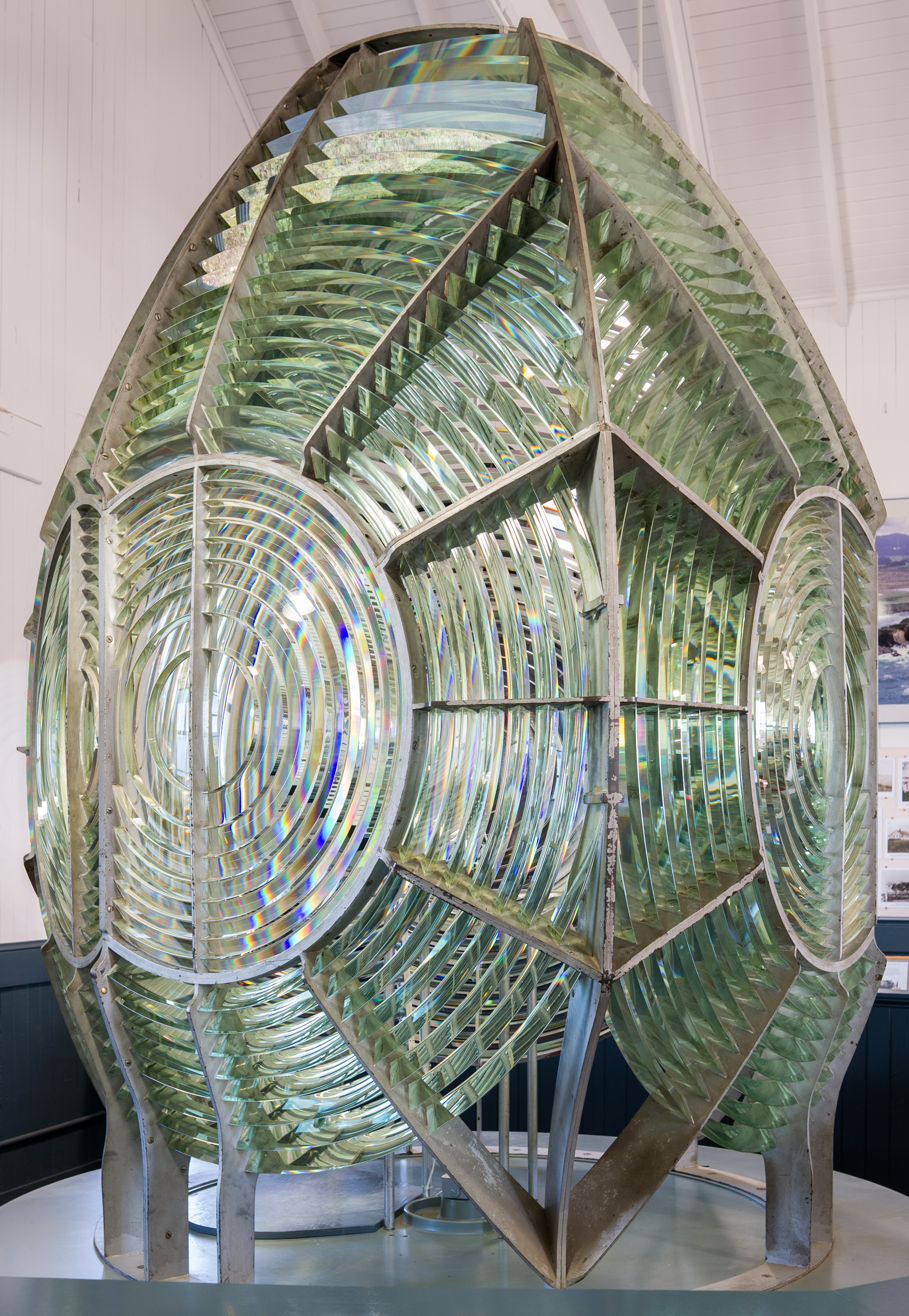
The Fresnel lens seen in the museum in this 2012 photo

== In popular culture ==
The final scenes of the Mel Gibson movie Forever Young (1992) were filmed near the lighthouse. The lighthouse also appears in the 2014 movie Need for Speed, as the finishing point of the De Leon underground supercar race that forms the climax of the film.

== Marine Protected Areas ==
The Point Arena State Marine Reserve & Point Arena State Marine Conservation Area are two marine protected areas that extend offshore from Point Arena. Sea Lion Cove State Marine Conservation Area and Saunders Reef State Marine Conservation Area lie south of Point Arena. Like underwater parks, these marine protected areas help conserve ocean wildlife and marine ecosystems.

== See also ==
- List of lighthouses in the United States
