= List of places in California (F) =

List of places in California - F

This list of current:

- cities
- towns, unincorporated communities
- counties, and other recognized places in the U.S. state of California.

Information on the number and names of counties in which the place lies, and its lower and upper ZIP Code bounds, if applicable are also included.

Name of place	Number of counties	Principal county	Lower zip code	Upper zip code
Fairbanks	1	El Dorado County		
Fairbanks Ranch	1	San Diego County		
Fairchild	1	San Joaquin County		
Fairfax	1	Marin County	94930	
Fairfield	1	Solano County	94533	35
Fairhaven	1	Humboldt County	95564	
Fairmead	1	Madera County	93610	
Fairmont	1	Los Angeles County	93534	
Fairmont Terrace	1	Alameda County	94577	
Fairmount	1	Contra Costa County	94530	
Fairmount Avenue	1	Contra Costa County		
Fair Oaks	1	Sacramento County	95628	
Fair Oaks	1	San Joaquin County		
Fair Oaks	1	San Luis Obispo County	93420	
Fair Oaks Ranch	1	Los Angeles County	91387	
Fair Play	1	El Dorado County		
Fairview	1	Alameda County	94542	
Fairview	1	Fresno County	93657	
Fairview	1	Orange County	92626	
Fairview	1	Stanislaus County	95350	
Fairview	1	Tulare County	93238	
Fairview	1	Ventura County		
Fairville	1	Sonoma County		
Fairway Park	1	Alameda County		
Fales Hot Springs	1	Mono County		
Falk	1	Humboldt County	95501	
Fallbrook	1	San Diego County	92028	88
Fallbrook Junction	1	San Diego County	92055	
Fallen Leaf	1	El Dorado County	96151	
Falling Springs	1	Los Angeles County		
Fallon	1	Marin County	94952	
Fall River Mills	1	Shasta County	96028	
Fallrock Junction	1	San Diego County		
Fallsvale	1	San Bernardino County	92339	
Famoso	1	Kern County		
Fancher	1	Fresno County	93702	
Fane	1	Tulare County		
Farley	1	Mendocino County		
Farmers Market	1	Los Angeles County	90036	
Farmersville	1	Tulare County	93223	
Farmington	1	San Joaquin County	95230	
Farr	1	San Diego County		
Fawnskin	1	San Bernardino County	92333	
Fayette	1	Tulare County		
Feather Falls	1	Butte County	95940	
Feather River Inn	1	Plumas County	96103	
Feather River Park	1	Plumas County		
Federal	1	Los Angeles County	90012	
Federal	1	Los Angeles County	90053	
Federal	1	Orange County	92805	
Federal Terrace	1	Solano County	94590	
Felicity	1	Imperial County	92283	
Felix	1	Calaveras County		
Fellows	1	Kern County	93224	
Felton	1	Santa Cruz County	95018	
Felton Grove	1	Santa Cruz County	95018	
Femmons	1	Tuolumne County		
Fenner	1	San Bernardino County		
Fergus	1	Merced County		
Fern	1	Shasta County		
Fern Ann Falls	1	Los Angeles County		
Fernbridge	1	Humboldt County	95540	
Fernbrook	1	San Diego County	92065	
Ferndale	1	Humboldt County	95536	
Fern Valley	1	Riverside County	92349	
Fernwood	1	Humboldt County		
Fernwood	1	Los Angeles County	90290	
Ferrum	1	Riverside County		
Fetters Hot Springs-Agua Caliente	1	Sonoma County		
Fiddletown	1	Amador County	95629	
Field	1	San Bernardino County		
Fieldbrook	1	Humboldt County	95521	
Fields Landing	1	Humboldt County	95537	
Figarden	1	Fresno County		
Fig Garden	1	Fresno County	93704	
Fig Garden Village	1	Fresno County	93704	
Fig Orchard	1	Kern County		
Figueroa	1	Los Angeles County	91001	
Fillmore	1	Ventura County	93015	
Fingal	1	Riverside County		
Finley	1	Lake County	95435	
Firebaugh	1	Fresno County	93622	
Fire Mountain	1	Tehama County	96063	
Firestone	1	Los Angeles County	90280	
Firestone Park	1	Los Angeles County	90001	
First Street	1	San Diego County	92054	
Fish Camp	1	Mariposa County	93623	
Fishel	1	San Bernardino County		
Fisher	1	Humboldt County		
Fisher	1	Shasta County		
Fish Rock	1	Mendocino County		
Fish Springs	1	Inyo County		
Fisk	1	San Francisco County	94122	
Fitchburg	1	Alameda County	94621	
Five Corners	1	San Joaquin County	95336	
Five Mile Terrace	1	El Dorado County	95667	
Five Points	1	Fresno County	93624	
Five Points	1	Los Angeles County		
Five Points	1	San Diego County		
Five Points	1	Solano County		
Flamingo Heights	1	San Bernardino County		
Fleetridge	1	San Diego County		
Fletcher	1	Modoc County		
Flinn Springs	1	San Diego County	92021	
Flint	1	Los Angeles County	90057	
Flintridge	1	Los Angeles County	91011	
Florence	1	Los Angeles County	90001	
Florence-Graham	1	Los Angeles County		
Florin	1	Sacramento County	95828	
Florin Road	1	Sacramento County		
Floriston	1	Nevada County	96111	
Flosden	1	Solano County		
Flosden Acres	1	Solano County	94590	
Flournoy	1	Tehama County	96029	
Flower Village	1	Kern County	93305	
Floyd	1	Fresno County		
Flumeville	1	Mendocino County		
Flynn	1	San Bernardino County		
Folsom	1	Sacramento County	95630	
Folsom Junction	1	Sacramento County	95630	
Fontana	1	San Bernardino County	92335	38
Foothill	1	Los Angeles County		
Foothill	1	Placer County		
Foothill Farms	1	Sacramento County	95841	
Foothill Ranch	1	Orange County	92610	
Foppiano	1	San Joaquin County		
Forbestown	1	Butte County	95941	
Ford City	1	Kern County	93268	
Forebay	1	Placer County		
Forest	1	Sierra County	95910	
Foresta	1	Mariposa County	95389	
Forest Falls	1	San Bernardino County	92339	
Forest Glen	1	Trinity County	96030	
Foresthill	1	Placer County	95631	
Forest Hills	1	Sonoma County		
Forest Home	1	Amador County	95669	
Forest Home	1	San Bernardino County	92339	
Forest Knolls	1	Marin County	94933	
Forest Lake	1	Lake County		
Forest Meadows	1	Calaveras County		
Forest Park	1	Santa Cruz County	95006	
Forest Ranch	1	Butte County	95942	
Forest Springs	1	Nevada County	95945	
Forest Springs	1	Santa Cruz County	95006	
Forestville	1	Sonoma County	95436	
Forks of Salmon	1	Siskiyou County	96031	
Fornis	1	El Dorado County		
Forrest Park	1	Los Angeles County	91350	
Fort Baker	1	Marin County	94965	
Fort Barry	1	Marin County	94965	
Fort Bidwell	1	Modoc County	96112	
Fort Bidwell Indian Reservation	1	Modoc County	95804	
Fort Bragg	1	Mendocino County	95437	
Fort Cronkhite	1	Marin County	94965	
Fort Dick	1	Del Norte County	95538	
Fort Goff	1	Siskiyou County		
Fort Hunter Liggett	1	Monterey County	93928	
Fort Independence Indian Reservation	1	Inyo County	95825	
Fort Irwin	1	San Bernardino County	92310	
Fort Jones	1	Siskiyou County	96032	
Fort MacArthur	1	Los Angeles County	90731	
Fort McDowell	1	San Francisco County		
Fort Mason	1	San Francisco County	94129	
Fort Miley	1	San Francisco County		
Fort Mojave Indian Reservation	1	San Bernardino County	92363	
Fort Ord	1	Monterey County	93941	
Fort Ord Village	1	Monterey County	93941	
Fort Piute	1	San Bernardino County		
Fort Romie	1	Monterey County	93960	
Fort Rosecrans	1	San Diego County	92106	
Fort Ross	1	Sonoma County	95450	
Fort Scott	1	San Francisco County		
Fort Seward	1	Humboldt County	95440	
Fort Sutter	1	Sacramento County	95816	
Fortuna	1	Humboldt County	95540	
Fort Winfield Scott	1	San Francisco County	94129	
Fort Yuma	1	Imperial County	92283	
Fort Yuma Indian Reservation	1	Imperial County	92283	
Foster	1	San Diego County		
Foster	1	Siskiyou County		
Foster City	1	San Mateo County	94404	
Fountain Springs	1	Tulare County		
Fountain Valley	1	Orange County	92708	
Four Corners	1	Contra Costa County		
Four Corners	1	San Bernardino County	92277; 93516	
Four Corners	1	San Diego County		
Four Corners	1	Sonoma County		
Four Pines	1	Lake County		
Four Points	1	Los Angeles County		
Fouts Springs	1	Colusa County	95979	
Fowler	1	Fresno County	93625	
Foy	1	Los Angeles County	90017	
Frances	1	Orange County		
Franciscan Park	1	San Mateo County	94014	
Franklin	1	Los Angeles County		
Franklin	1	Napa County	94559	
Franklin	1	Sacramento County	95624	
Franklin	1	San Joaquin County		
Frazier Park	1	Kern County	93225	
Freda	1	San Bernardino County		
Fredalba	1	San Bernardino County		
Fredericksburg	1	Alpine County	96120	
Freedom	1	Santa Cruz County	95019	
Freeman	1	Kern County		
Freeport	1	Sacramento County		
Freeport	1	Sacramento County		
Freestone	1	Sonoma County	95472	
Freeway Park	1	Orange County		
Fremont	1	Alameda County	94536	55
Fremont	1	San Bernardino County		
Fremont	1	Yolo County		
French Camp	1	San Joaquin County	95231	
French Corral	1	Nevada County	95977	
French Gulch	1	Shasta County	96033	
Frenchtown	1	El Dorado County		
Frenchtown	1	Yuba County		
Fresh Pond	1	El Dorado County	95726	
Freshwater	1	Humboldt County	95501	
Freshwater Corners	1	Humboldt County		
Fresno	1	Fresno County	93701	93888
Friant	1	Fresno County	93626	
Friendly Hills	1	Los Angeles County		
Friendly Hills	1	San Bernardino County	92252	
Friendly Valley	1	Los Angeles County	91321	
Frontera	1	San Bernardino County	91720	
Frost	1	San Bernardino County		
Fruitdale	1	Santa Clara County		
Fruitland	1	Humboldt County	95554	
Fruitland	1	Los Angeles County		
Fruitridge	1	Sacramento County	95820	
Fruitridge Manor	1	Sacramento County		
Fruitvale	1	Alameda County	94601	
Fruitvale	1	Kern County	93308	
Fruto	1	Glenn County	95988	
Fuller Acres	1	Kern County		
Fuller Park	1	Orange County		
Fullerton	1	Orange County	92831	38
Fulton	1	Sonoma County	95439	
Furnace Creek	1	Inyo County		
Furnace Creek Ranch	1	Inyo County		
