= Frenchtown =

Frenchtown may refer to:

In the United States:

- Frenchtown, California (disambiguation)
  - Frenchtown, El Dorado County, California
  - Frenchtown, Yuba County, California
- Frenchtown (Tallahassee), a section of the city of Tallahassee, Florida
- Frenchtown, Indiana
- Frenchtown, Maryland (disambiguation)
  - Frenchtown, Cecil County, Maryland
  - Frenchtown (Perryville, Maryland)
  - Frenchtown-Rumbly, Maryland
- Frenchtown Charter Township, Michigan
  - Battle of Frenchtown, 1813
- French Town, Missouri
- Frenchtown, Montana
- Frenchtown Township, Antelope County, Nebraska
- Frenchtown, New Jersey
- Frenchtown, Darke County, Ohio
- Frenchtown, Seneca County, Ohio
- Frenchtown, Pennsylvania
- Frenchtown, a section of the Fifth Ward in Houston, Texas
- Frenchtown, United States Virgin Islands
- A distinct neighborhood in Tomahawk, Wisconsin
- Frenchtown, Washington

== See also ==
- Frenchtown Historic District
- Frenchtown Township (disambiguation)
- Frenchtown High School, Frenchtown, Montana, United States
- Frenchtown School District, Frenchtown, New Jersey, United States
- French Quarter (disambiguation)
- French Settlement (disambiguation)
- French Concession
