= Casserly Creek =

Stream in California, United States

- Location of mouth

Location
- Country: United States
- State: California
- Region: Santa Clara and Santa Cruz Counties, California

Physical characteristics
- Source: west slope of Mount Madonna in the southern Santa Cruz Mountains
  - coordinates: 37°00′30″N 121°42′59″W
  - elevation: 1,843 ft (562 m)
- Mouth: Marsh draining into College Lake on Salsipuedes Creek
  - location: Interlaken, California
  - coordinates: 36°57′16″N 121°44′37″W
  - elevation: 59 ft (18 m)
- Length: 6.1 mi (9.8 km)

Casserly Creek is a 6.2-mile-long (10.0 km) stream originating on Mount Madonna in the southern Santa Cruz Mountains in Santa Clara County and flows southwest into Santa Cruz County and ends in a large marsh, which drains an additional 0.6 miles (0.97 km) into College Lake and Salsipuedes Creek, which, in turns, flows to the Pajaro River, and thence to Monterey Bay and the Pacific Ocean.

== History ==
Casserly Creek was named for Eugene Casserly, an Irish-born American journalist, lawyer, and politician who moved to the area in 1853, and became a U. S. Senator from California.

== Watershed and Course ==
Casserly Creek has its origin just west of the peak of Mount Madonna in the southern Santa Cruz Mountains in Santa Clara County. It flows southwest until it is joined from the left by Gaffey Creek in Banks Canyon just before crossing into Santa Cruz County. From there it turns south and is met on the right by its 8.7 miles (14.0 km)-long Green Valley Creek tributary, then on the right by Hughes Creek. Just south of Interlaken it ends in a large marsh, which in turns drains into College Lake, the upper part of Salsipuedes Creek., which is in turn, tributary to the Pajaro River.

== Ecology and Conservation ==
Casserly Creek is continuously used by steelhead trout (Oncorhynchus mykiss), and a 2007 report by Dr. Jerry Smith found multiple trout age classes from College Lake to the Banks Canyon/Gaffey Creek confluence.

== See also ==
- Pajaro River
- Santa Cruz Mountains
