= French Settlement (disambiguation) =

French Settlement may mean:

For description of French colonization in French Empire

- French colonial empires
  - French colonization of the Americas - French settlement in the New World

  - New France - French colony

      - Louisiana (New France)
      - Canada, New France
      - Acadia
      - Illinois Country

For the town in Louisiana:

- French Settlement, Louisiana - French settlement in Louisiana

For an early settlement in Oregon:

- French Settlement, Oregon - Renamed long ago to Melrose, Oregon

== See also ==
- French Quarter (disambiguation)
- French Concession
- Frenchtown (disambiguation)
