= Forest Springs =

Forest Springs may refer to:

- Forest Springs, Nevada County, California
- Forest Springs, Santa Cruz County, California
- Forest Springs, Missouri
