= Quarter (urban subdivision) =

Division, section, region, or part of a town

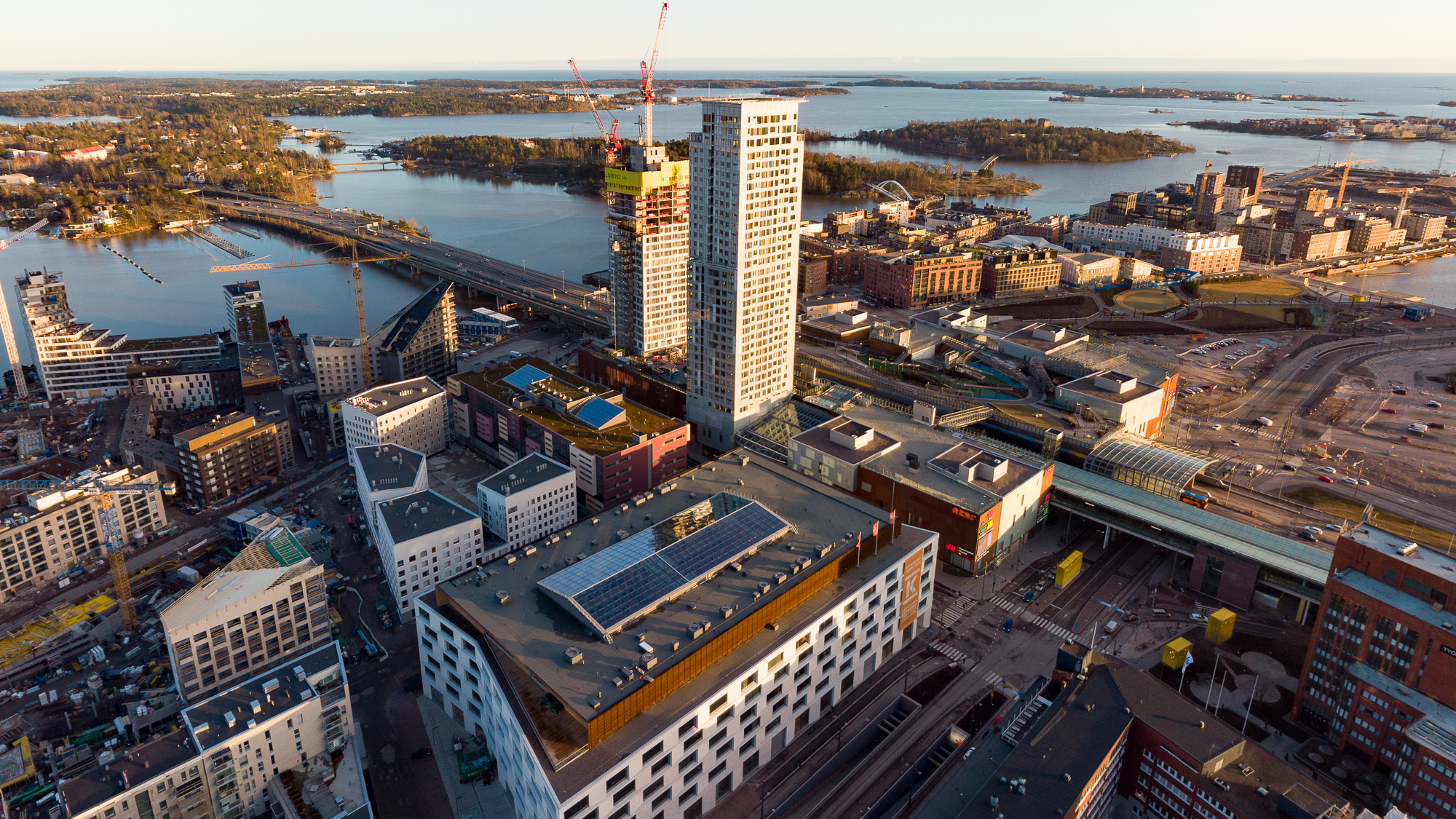
Kalasatama, a quarter of Helsinki, Finland

A quarter is a section of an urban settlement. A quarter can be administratively defined and its borders officially designated, and it may have its own administrative structure (subordinate to that of the city, town or other urban area). Such a division is particularly common in countries like Bulgaria (Bulgarian: квартал, romanized: kvartal), Croatia (četvrt), France (Quartier), Georgia (კვარტალი, k'vart'ali), Italy (Quartiere), Romania (Cartier), and Serbia (четврт / četvrt). It may be denoted as a borough (in English-speaking countries), Portugal/Brazil (bairro), Spain (barrio); or some other term (e.g. Cambodia (សង្កាត់ sangkat), Germany (Stadtteil), Poland (dzielnica), and Turkey (semt)).

Quarter can also refer to a non-administrative but distinct neighbourhood with its own character: for example, a slum quarter. The term is often used for a district connected with a particular group of people: for instance, some cities are said to have Jewish quarters, diplomatic quarters, or Bohemian quarters.

== History ==
Most ancient Roman cities were divided to four parts, called quarters, by their two main avenues: the cardo and the decumanus maximus.

== See also ==
- Bairro
- Barrio
- Borough
- European Quarter
- French Quarter, in various places
- German Quarter, Moscow
- Irish Quarter, Birmingham, England
- Jewellery Quarter, Birmingham, England
- Latin Quarter, in various places (most notably Paris)
- Municipality, an administrative division
- Township, typically a settlement
