= Corralitos, California =

Corralitos
- census-designated place
- Location in Santa Cruz County and the state of California

- Location in the United States
- Coordinates: 36°59′29″N 121°48′7″W
- Country: United States
- State: California
- County: Santa Cruz

Area
  - Total: 9.00 sq mi (23.31 km^{2})
  - Land: 8.98 sq mi (23.27 km^{2})
  - Water: 0.015 sq mi (0.04 km^{2}) 0.16%
- Elevation: 269 ft (82 m)

Population (2020)
  - Total: 2,342
  - Density: 260.6/sq mi (100.63/km^{2})
- Time zone: UTC-8 (PST)
  - Summer (DST): UTC-7 (PDT)
- ZIP code: 95076
- Area code: 831
- FIPS code: 06-16434
- GNIS feature ID: 1658321

Corralitos (Spanish for "Small pens") is a census-designated place (CDP) in Santa Cruz County, California, United States. It is a rural area known for its agriculture of apples and strawberries, and its notable Corralitos Market and Sausage Co. Moreover, its location near the Pacific Ocean optimizes viticulture.

The population was 2,342 at the 2020 census.

== Geography ==
Corralitos is located at 36°59′29″N 121°48′7″W (36.991303, -121.802013). It is located on Corralitos Creek, a tributary of Salsipuedes Creek which is in turn the lowest tributary of the Pajaro River.

According to the United States Census Bureau, the CDP has a total area of 9.0 square miles (23 km^{2}), of which 9.0 square miles (23 km^{2}) is land and 0.16% is water.

== Demographics ==
Historical population
Census	Pop.	Note	%±
1990	2,513		—
2000	2,431		−3.3%
2010	2,326		−4.3%
2020	2,342		0.7%
U.S. Decennial Census; 1860–1870 1880-1890; 1900 1910 1920; 1930 1940 1950; 1960 1970 1980; 1990 2000 2010; 2020

Corralitos first appeared as a census-designated place in the 1990 United States census.

=== Racial and ethnic composition ===
Corralitos CDP, California – Racial and ethnic composition Note: the US Census treats Hispanic/Latino as an ethnic category. This table excludes Latinos from the racial categories and assigns them to a separate category. Hispanics/Latinos may be of any race.
Race / Ethnicity (NH = Non-Hispanic)	Pop 2000	Pop 2010	Pop 2020	% 2000	% 2010	% 2020
White alone (NH)	1,832	1,666	1,521	75.36%	71.63%	64.94%
Black or African American alone (NH)	4	16	5	0.16%	0.69%	0.21%
Native American or Alaska Native alone (NH)	11	5	5	0.45%	0.21%	0.21%
Asian alone (NH)	55	45	46	2.26%	1.93%	1.96%
Native Hawaiian or Pacific Islander alone (NH)	1	1	0	0.04%	0.04%	0.00%
Other race alone (NH)	11	9	23	0.45%	0.39%	0.98%
Mixed race or Multiracial (NH)	52	52	107	2.14%	2.24%	4.57%
Hispanic or Latino (any race)	465	532	635	19.13%	22.87%	27.11%
Total	2,431	2,326	2,342	100.00%	100.00%	100.00%

=== 2020 census ===
As of the 2020 census, Corralitos had a population of 2,342. The population density was 260.6 inhabitants per square mile (100.6/km^{2}). The age distribution was 17.2% under the age of 18, 9.6% aged 18 to 24, 20.8% aged 25 to 44, 27.7% aged 45 to 64, and 24.7% who were 65 years of age or older. The median age was 47.2 years. For every 100 females, there were 103.7 males, and for every 100 females age 18 and over there were 102.0 males age 18 and over.

The whole population lived in households. There were 837 households, out of which 29.0% included children under the age of 18, 62.4% were married-couple households, 6.9% were cohabiting couple households, 20.4% had a female householder with no spouse or partner present, and 10.3% had a male householder with no spouse or partner present. 16.5% of households were one person, and 6.9% were one person aged 65 or older. The average household size was 2.8. There were 643 families (76.8% of all households).

0.0% of residents lived in urban areas, while 100.0% lived in rural areas.

There were 875 housing units at an average density of 97.4 units per square mile (37.6 units/km^{2}), of which 837 (95.7%) were occupied and 4.3% were vacant. Of occupied units, 82.0% were owner-occupied and 18.0% were occupied by renters. The homeowner vacancy rate was 0.6% and the rental vacancy rate was 2.6%.

=== Income and poverty ===
In 2023, the US Census Bureau estimated that the median household income was $165,670, and the per capita income was $105,084. About 1.6% of families and 6.3% of the population were below the poverty line.

=== 2010 census ===
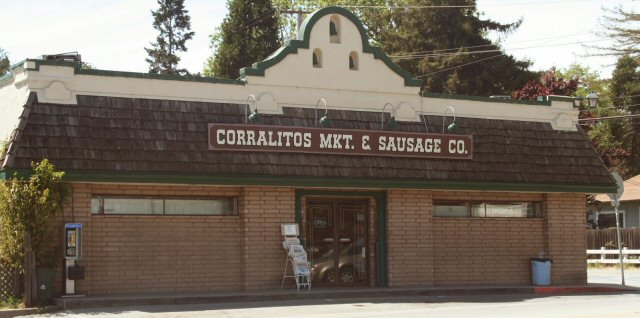
Corralitos market in Corralitos

The 2010 United States census reported that Corralitos had a population of 2,326. The population density was 258.4 inhabitants per square mile (99.8/km^{2}). The racial makeup of Corralitos was 1,980 (85.1%) White, 16 (0.7%) African American, 12 (0.5%) Native American, 48 (2.1%) Asian, 190 (8.2%) from other races, and 79 (3.4%) from two or more races. Hispanic or Latino of any race were 532 persons (22.9%).

The Census reported that 99.7% of the population lived in households and 0.3% lived in non-institutionalized group quarters.

There were 829 households, out of which 257 (31.0%) had children under the age of 18 living in them, 511 (61.6%) were opposite-sex married couples living together, 62 (7.5%) had a female householder with no husband present, 42 (5.1%) had a male householder with no wife present. There were 51 (6.2%) unmarried opposite-sex partnerships, and 3 (0.4%) same-sex married couples or partnerships. 150 households (18.1%) were made up of individuals, and 65 (7.8%) had someone living alone who was 65 years of age or older. The average household size was 2.80. There were 615 families (74.2% of all households); the average family size was 3.09.

The population was spread out, with 504 people (21.7%) under the age of 18, 174 people (7.5%) aged 18 to 24, 482 people (20.7%) aged 25 to 44, 829 people (35.6%) aged 45 to 64, and 337 people (14.5%) who were 65 years of age or older. The median age was 45.1 years. For every 100 females, there were 98.5 males. For every 100 females age 18 and over, there were 98.3 males.

There were 888 housing units at an average density of 98.7 per square mile (38.1/km^{2}), of which 73.9% were owner-occupied and 26.1% were occupied by renters. The homeowner vacancy rate was 0.8%; the rental vacancy rate was 2.3%. 74.5% of the population lived in owner-occupied housing units and 25.2% lived in rental housing units.

== Government ==
In the California State Legislature, Corralitos is in the 17th senatorial district, represented by Democrat John Laird, and in the 29th Assembly district, represented by Democrat Robert Rivas.

In the United States House of Representatives, Corralitos is in California's 19th congressional district, represented by Democrat Jimmy Panetta.

== Notable people ==
- James A. Linscott (1846–1913), lumberman, politician
