= Forest Home =

Forest Home may refer to:

- Forest Home, Belize, a village in Toledo District, Belize
- James Greer Bankhead House, Sulligent, Alabama, also known as "Forest Home", listed on the NRHP in Alabama
- Forest Home (Trinity, Alabama), listed on the NRHP in Alabama
- Forest Home, California
  - Forest Home, Amador County, California, former community in Amador County
  - Forest Home, San Bernardino County, California
- Forest Home (Four Forks, Louisiana), listed on the NRHP in Louisiana
- Forest Home, New York
  - Forest Home Historic District, Forest Home, NY, listed on the NRHP in New York

It may also refer to:

- Forest Home Cemetery (Chicago), Forest Park, Illinois
- Forest Home Cemetery, Milwaukee. WI, listed on the NRHP in Wisconsin
- Forest Home Farms, in San Ramon, California, listed on the NRHP in California
- Forest Home Plantation, Centreville, MS, listed on the NRHP in Mississippi
- Forest Home Township, Michigan
