= Frenchtown, Maryland =

Frenchtown, Maryland may refer to:

- Frenchtown, Baltimore, the historic French quarter of Baltimore
- Frenchtown (ghost town), Maryland, on the Elk River in Cecil County
- Frenchtown (unincorporated community), Maryland, north of Perryville in Cecil County
- Frenchtown-Rumbly, Maryland, in Somerset County
