= Kreimer =

Kreimer is a surname. Notable people with the surname include:

- Aimée R. Kreimer (born 1975), American cancer epidemiologist
- Dirk Kreimer (born 1960), German physicist

== See also ==
- Disappearance of Asha Kreimer
