= West Side and Mendocino Railroad =

Overview
- Locale: Willows - Fruto, California
- Dates of operation: 1884–1888

Technical
- Track gauge: 4 ft 8 1/2 in (1,435 mm) standard gauge

The West Side and Mendocino Railroad is a defunct railroad that operated in California.

The WS&M had a 16.84 mile route that ran west from Willows, California to Fruto, California. It began officially operating on July 1, 1888, however special excursion trains were being chartered by San Francisco real estate developer Eastin Eldridge & Company in order to bring prospective buyers to Fruto and develop the area. Fruto existed as a postal location from 1888 - 1953. Fruto today is a Willows postal location.

There was a depot at Fruto. The stationmaster lived at the depot. The depot was destroyed by fire in the 1950s. The end of the line at Fruto also had a water tower, freight storage area, livestock loading area, and a roundhouse. In the branch's early days there were two trains that ran the line; one freight and one passenger. The passenger train originated at Fruto and ran to Willows in the morning. It returned to Fruto in the afternoon. The freight train originated at Willows in the morning and returned to Willows in the afternoon.

During World War I and II the line hauled chromite ore to Bay Area smelters.

== Connection with the Southern Pacific Railroad ==
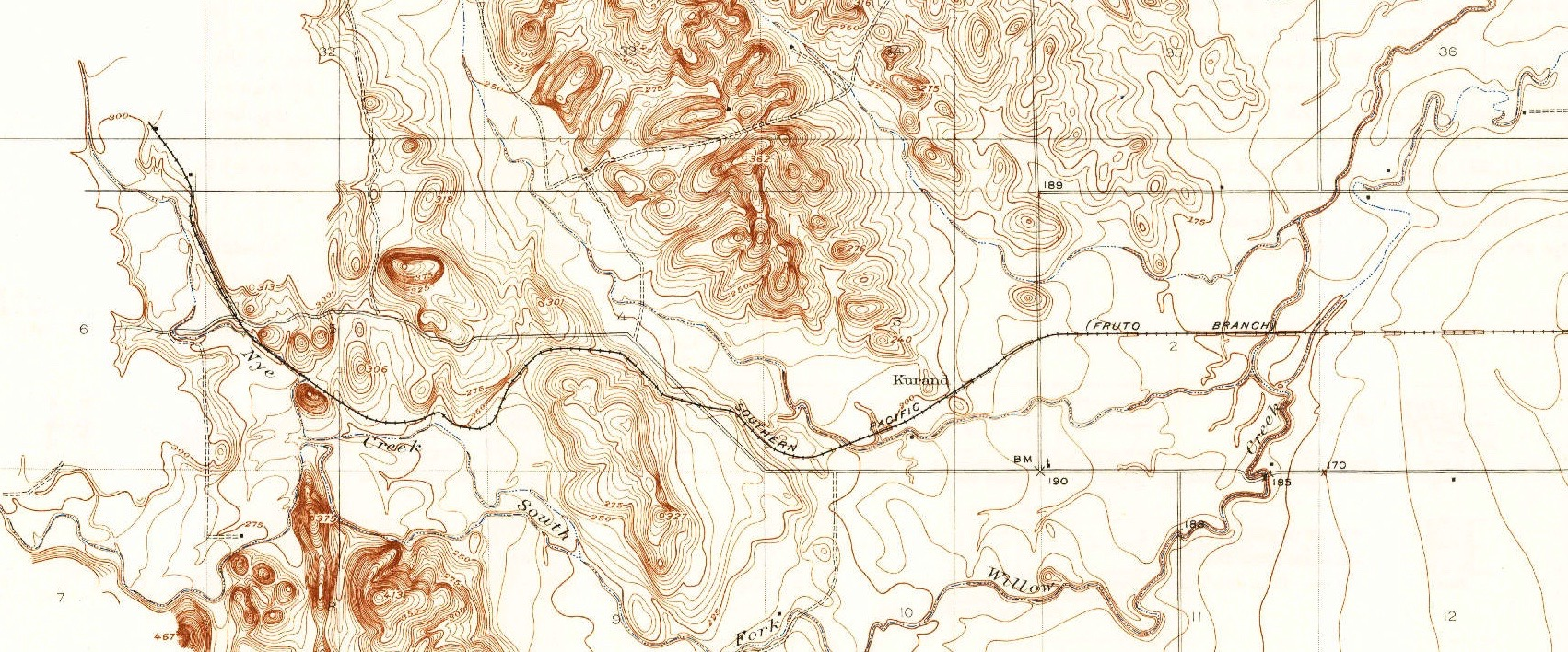
Western portion of route in 1917

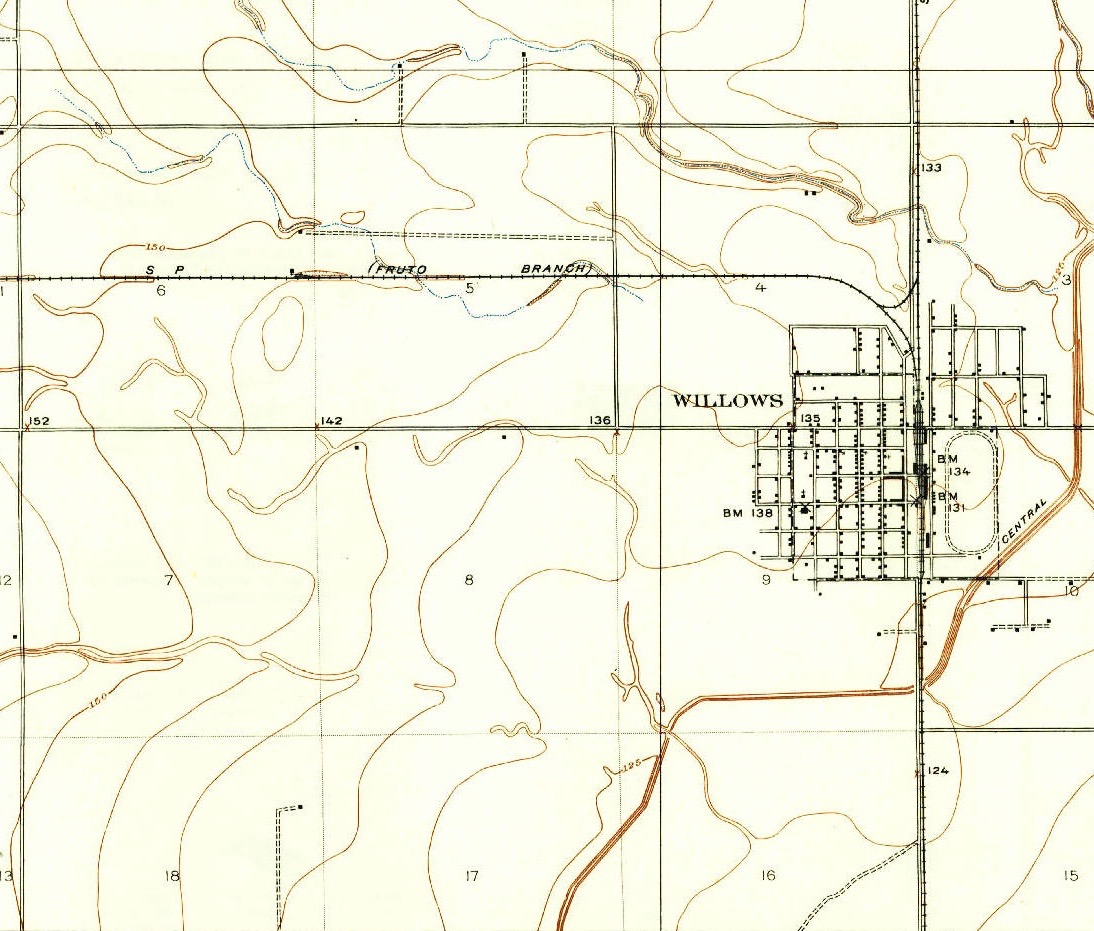
Eastern portion of route in 1917

The West Side & Mendocino connected with the mainline of the Northern Railway, a non-operating subsidiary of Southern Pacific, at Willows. The Northern Railway had been operating the mainline 8 – 10 years prior to the construction of the WS&M and ran from Tehama, California to Woodland, California.

== Timeline ==
- October 3, 1878 - Northern Railway (a Southern Pacific subsidiary) completes construction from Williams - Willows. (Other sources say railroad reached Willows on September 26, 1878).
- July 31, 1882 - Northern Railway completes construction from Willows - Orland.
- 1884 - Plans are made to build a railroad from Willows to the Pacific Ocean coast of Mendocino County. The proposed route is to be along the Elk Creek and through Grindstone Canyon. It was anticipated that the railroad would haul local fruit as well as haul redwood and sugar pine lumber from Mendocino County to a proposed lumber mill in Willows. However, the railroad never made it more than 17 miles east of Willows.
- October 26, 1886 - Contract to build line awarded to Turon & Knox of Sacramento.
- April 1887 - Grading complete.
- March 1888 - Began laying track using Chinese labor.
- May 15, 1888 - West Side & Mendocino consolidated into Northern Railway/Southern Pacific.
- July 1, 1888 - Northern Railway/Southern Pacific opens line from Willows - Fruto (16.84 miles) and line is known as the "Mendocino Branch" of Southern Pacific's Benicia Division, Clear Lake Subdivision.
- July 14, 1898 Northern Railway sold and consolidated into Southern Pacific.
- World War I - Line hauls chrome ore.
- 1917 Line hauls copper ore from the Frank Tendor Copper Mine.
- 1927 Line hauls materials for the Stony Gorge Dam project and livestock.
- 1951 Southern Pacific abandons most of the branch line except for a one-mile section west of Willows that was left in place to handle wood products produced at the Setzer Box Company mill in Elk Creek.
- 1993 Southern Pacific leases their "West Valley Line" (Davis - Tehama), including the small portion of the Mendocino Branch serving the Johns-Manville Fiberglass Plant east of Willows, to the California Northern Railroad.

== Route ==
- Willows - Milepost 0
- Kurand - Milepost 5.9
- Halconera - Milepost 8.5
- Millsholm - Milepost 9.7 (named after Edgar Mills, a Fruto property owner; and "holm" - German for hills; this location was in the foothills)
- Athena - Milepost 13.7
- Fruto - Milepost 17.1
