= Corralitos Creek =

Corralitos Creek Arroyo de los Corralitos
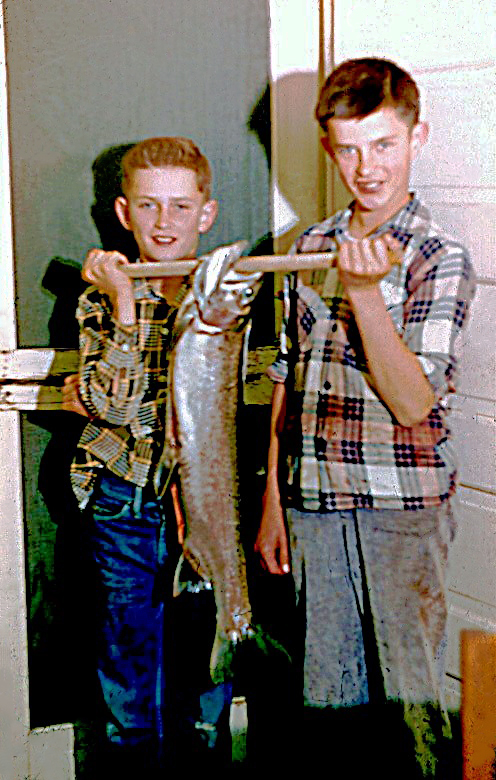
- Brothers Al and Bill Leikam with large steelhead trout caught in Corralitos Creek near Freedom, California in 1954.

- Location of the mouth of Corralitos Creek in Watsonville, California

Location
- Country: United States
- State: California
- Region: Santa Cruz County
- Cities: Corralitos, Freedom, Watsonville

Physical characteristics
- Source: Western slope of the Santa Cruz Mountains
  - coordinates: 37°04′05″N 121°50′15″W
  - elevation: 1,831 ft (558 m)
- Mouth: Confluence with Salsipuedes Creek
  - location: Northeast of Watsonville, California
  - coordinates: 36°56′06″N 121°44′34″W
  - elevation: 62 ft (19 m)

Basin features
- Tributaries
  - left: Browns Canyon Wash

Corralitos Creek is a 14.1-mile-long (22.7 km) southward-flowing stream originating on the western slope of the Santa Cruz Mountains in Santa Cruz County, California, United States. It courses through the communities of Corralitos and Freedom, and touches the northernmost part of Watsonville before joining Salsipuedes Creek. Salsipuedes Creek is the lowermost tributary of the Pajaro River, which carries its waters to Monterey Bay and the Pacific Ocean.

== History ==
On Sunday, October 15, 1769, the Portola expedition's route took them northwestward across today's Corralitos Creek and through a redwood forest. They stopped to camp near a lagoon in the middle of a narrow valley which Father Crespi named Santa Teresa. They left this place in the morning by a northwest course, following the narrow valley where there were many extremely large redwood trees. The lagoon was named Laguna de las Calabasas but is now referred to as Corralitos Lagoon. The lagoon is located on the Rancho Los Corralitos very near its boundary with the Calabasas Rancho just west of Freedom Boulevard and is not part of the Corralitos Creek mainstem. Rancho Los Corralitos was a Mexican land grant given to José Amesti, a Basque immigrant in 1823. "Los Corralitos" means "the little corrals" in Spanish. The small town of Amesti, California still bears his name.

== Watershed and course ==
The Corralitos and Salsipuedes Creeks sub-basins are the lowest tributaries of the Pajaro River. Browns Creek is the largest tributary of Corralitos Creek although many small gulches draining the southwestern Santa Cruz Mountains also contribute. Casserly Creek and Salsipuedes Creek flow to the now dry College Lake (originally named Laguna Grande), then Salsipuedes Creek exits College Lake and picks up before Corralitos Creek just beside Highway 152.

== Habitat and wildlife ==
The upper watershed of Corralitos Creek and its Browns Creek tributary is designated "high potential" habitat for steelhead trout (Oncorhynchus mykiss) and is a top priority stream for the protection and restoration of the South-Central California Coast Distinct Population Segment (DPS) of this anadromous fish.

Citizen naturalist and author William "Bill" Leikam reported Chinook salmon (Oncorhynchus tshawytscha) and steelhead trout in Corralitos Creek while fishing in the reach along Freedom, California at the season's first large winter storms through the 1950s. This is consistent with a 1912 report by Stanford University ichthyologist John Otterbein Snyder of Chinook salmon (Oncorhynchus tschawytscha) in the Pajaro River watershed.

The valleys of the upper watershed are dominated by coast redwood (Sequoia sempervirens).

== See also ==
- List of rivers of California
