= Frenchtown, California =

Frenchtown, California may refer to:

- Frenchtown, El Dorado County, California
- Frenchtown, Yuba County, California
