= Signal Port, California =

Signal Port
- Former settlement
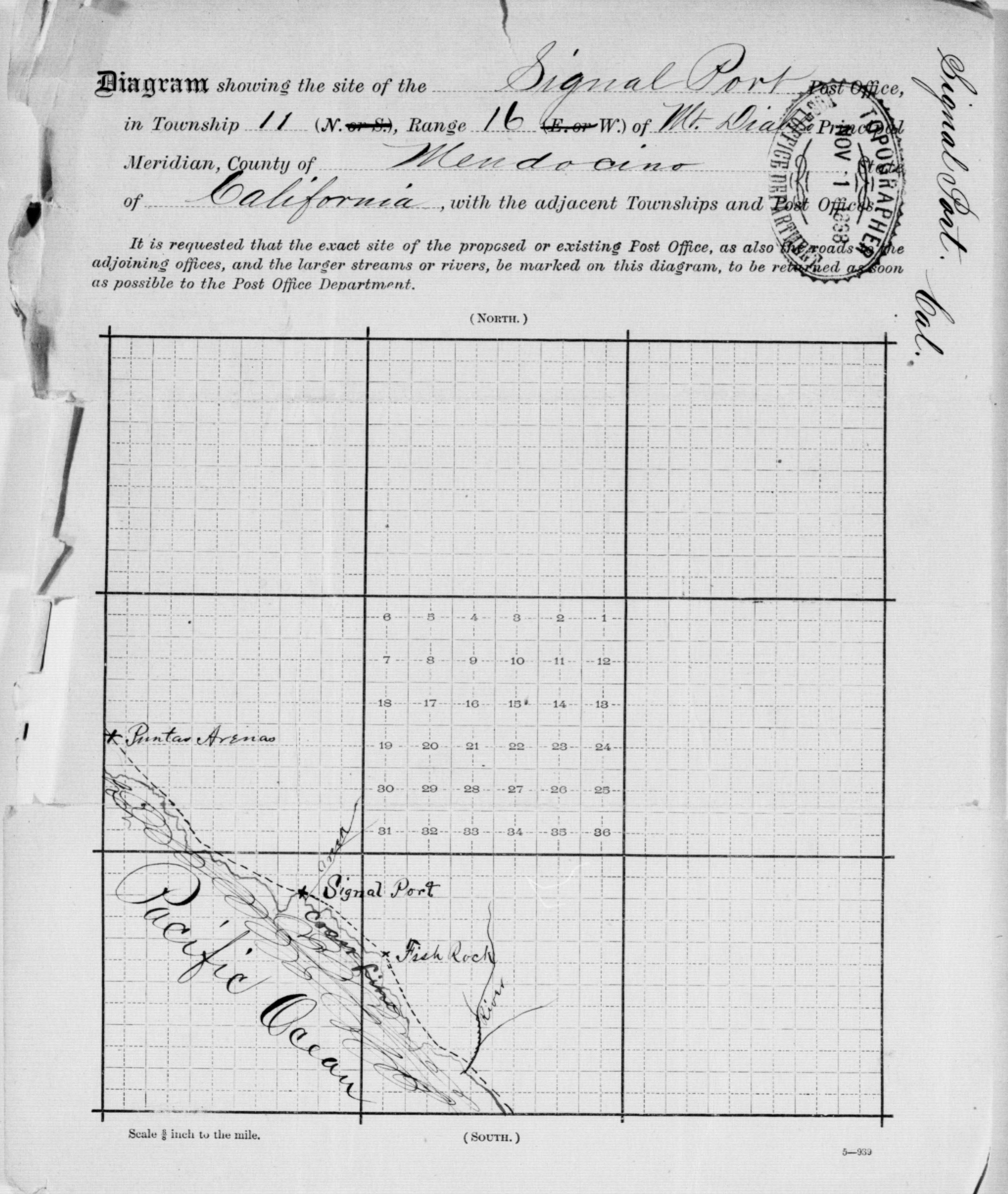
- Map of Signal Port location, 1888

- Location in California
- Coordinates: 38°49′45″N 123°36′56″W
- Country: United States
- State: California
- County: Mendocino
- Elevation: 108 ft (33 m)

Signal Port (also, Hardscratch and Signal) is a former settlement in Mendocino County, California, United States. It was located near the mouth of Signal Creek 3.5 miles (5.6 km) northwest of Fish Rock, at an elevation of 108 feet (33 m).

The Signal post office operated for a time in 1882. The Signal Port post office operated from 1888 to 1890. The name refers to signals given ships waiting to load lumber at the site.
