= Frenchtown Township =

Frenchtown Township may refer to the following places in the United States:

- Frenchtown Charter Township, Michigan
- Frenchtown Township, Antelope County, Nebraska
