= Disappearance of Asha Kreimer =

Australian disappearance case

Asha Kreimer
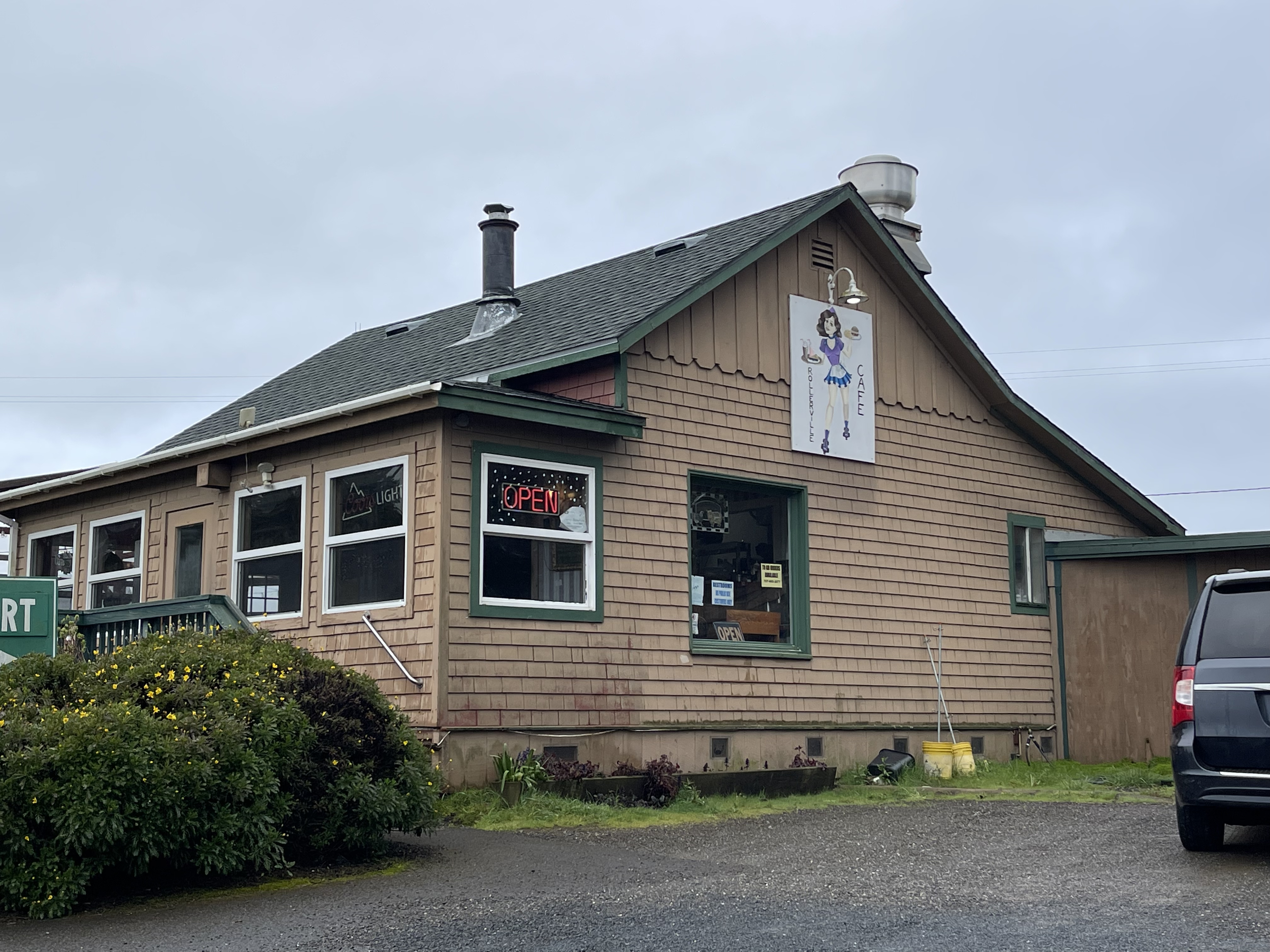
- Rollerville café, Flumeville
- Born: May 2, 1989; Hilo, Hawaii, U.S.
- Disappeared: September 21, 2015 (aged 26); Point Arena, California, U.S.
- Status: Missing for 10 years, 8 months and 21 days
- Known for: Missing person
- Parent: Jeannie Kreimer: Russell Kreimer

Asha Kreimer (born May 2, 1989; disappeared September 21, 2015) is a missing Australian woman. She had been awake for five days, suffering a mental health crisis, and had been released following a psychiatric evaluation. While eating breakfast with her boyfriend and a family friend in the Rollerville Cafe in Point Arena, California, she headed for the restroom. She was following her friend, but the friend soon found that Kreimer had disappeared.

Kreimer likely never entered the bathroom. At the time of her disappearance she was dressed in street clothes, but she was barefoot. She had no money, credit cards, or identification documents with her. Her jacket was later found discarded along the road, but no definitive proof of her fate or whereabouts has ever been discovered.

== Background ==
Twenty-six-year-old Asha Kreimer, who held dual US-Australian citizenship, had been living with her boyfriend in Albion, California, for three years when she suffered a mental health crisis. She had never previously had mental health issues. However, after being awake for four nights and shouting incoherently, she was taken to Mendocino Coast District Hospital in Fort Bragg, California, on September 20, 2015. The contractor who had taken over when Mendocino County privatized mental health services was supposed to evaluate her under California Code 5150 to determine whether she was a risk to herself or others. However, Kreimer was so resistant to having her vital signs taken prior to a mental health evaluation that the Fort Bragg Police Department was called. In the end, Kreimer was released without evaluation or treatment, to the custody of her boyfriend and a visiting Australian childhood friend.

== Disappearance ==
After Kreimer's release, the trio then drove south toward Point Arena, stopping at the Rollerville Cafe in Flumeville. At 9:30 a.m., while they were in the cafe, Kreimer's friend got up to go to the restroom. A few seconds later, Kreimer decided that she would also go to the restroom, and followed her friend, although the friend was unaware that Kreimer was behind her. When the friend returned to the table, Kreimer's boyfriend told her that Kreimer had followed her to the bathroom, but the friend said she never saw Kreimer in the bathroom. Investigators believe that Kreimer never entered the bathroom and wandered off instead. At the time she disappeared, Kreimer was barefoot and dressed in black skinny jeans and a gray hoodie. She left without money, credit cards, or identification. She also may have left her cell phone behind, though that is debated. Her jacket was subsequently found along the road to the Point Arena Light.

== Continued search ==
There have been subsequent vague reports of Kreimer. According to a spokesman for the Mendocino County Sheriff's Office, she supposedly returned north to her Albion home and retrieved her German shepherd. A surfer at Gualala, south of the cafe, also purportedly saw her at about 3 p.m. on the day she disappeared.

As of February 2016, the search for Kreimer continued, as her friends at her ancestral home in Alice Springs, Australia raised funds to continue looking.

As of April 24, 2018, Kreimer's mother reportedly still travels back to California from Australia every few months to look for her daughter.

It has been reported to Mendocino County Sheriff's Office (MCSO) by Kreimer's family that it is possible that Kreimer has taken an assumed name, related to a reported mental health incident in the days before her disappearance.

== Media ==
In 2017, Kreimer's mother, Jeannie, was approached by Netflix to produce a story on her daughter.

Episode 18 of the Thin Air Podcast covers Kreimer's disappearance.

== See also ==
- List of people who disappeared mysteriously (2000–present)
