= Salsipuedes Creek (Pajaro River) =

Stream in Santa Cruz County, California, US

Salsipuedes Creek Arroyo de Salsipuedes
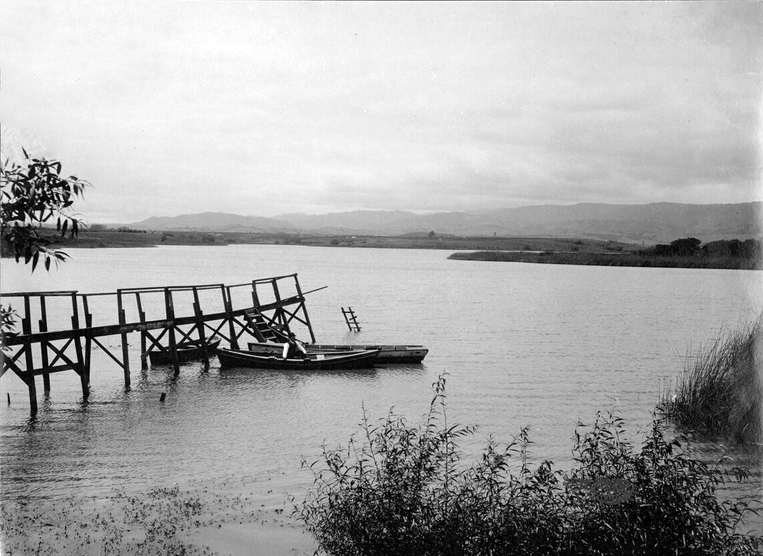
- Man on a boat near a dock in College Lake (originally Laguna Grande) just east of Watsonville, California, circa 1900, courtesy of University of Southern California. Libraries and California Historical Society

- Location of mouth

Location
- Country: United States
- State: California
- Region: Santa Cruz County, California

Physical characteristics
- Source
  - location: 2.5 mi (4 km) east of Watsonville
  - coordinates: 36°57′05″N 121°43′14″W
  - elevation: 148 ft (45 m)
- Mouth: Pajaro River
  - location: Watsonville
  - coordinates: 36°54′35″N 121°43′12″W
  - elevation: 52 ft (16 m)
- Length: 4 mi (6.4 km)

Basin features
- Tributaries
  - right: Casserly Creek, Corralitos Creek

Salsipuedes Creek is a 4-mile-long (6.4 km) southward-flowing stream originating about 2.5 miles (4.0 km) east of Watsonville in Santa Cruz County, California. Most of the upper reach was the historic Laguna Grande, now referred to as College Lake.

== History ==
In 1817 Spanish Governor Pablo Vicente de Solá granted the Mission Santa Cruz padres the right to pasture their horses at the "Bolsa de Sals si puedes five-and-a-half leagues from the Villa de Branciforte". This bolsa, Spanish for pocket of marshland, was College Lake, named after the polite nickname "The College" for the Roman Catholic Orphan Asylum built nearby in 1869. College Lake (and later College Road) get their names from this nickname. In 1924, Reclamation District Two was created, and the lake was pumped dry to create more farmland. The USGS survey maps show College Lake as an "intermittent lake." "Salsipuedes" was a Spanish language expression meaning "get out if you can" often used for rough terrain.

== Watershed and course ==
Salsipuedes Creek above College Road is College Lake, and from there perhaps only 0.8 miles (1.3 km) of stream from its origin just above Carlton Road. However, it has a significant tributary, Casserly Creek. Casserly Creek terminates in a large marsh just south of Interlaken, California, which drains into College Lake. Below College Lake, Salsipuedes Creek is joined by Corralitos Creek just south of College Road, as delineated on USGS maps, however others have suggested that Salsipuedes Creek is instead tributary to Corralitos Creek. From its confluence with Corralitos Creek, Salsipuedes Creek flows 2.5 miles (4.0 km) to the Pajaro River.

== Ecology and conservation ==
In a 2007 report, Dr. Jerry Smith reported steelhead trout of all age classes in both Casserly Creek and Corralitos Creek.
