= Coward Creek (Pajaro River) =

Stream in California, United States

- Location of mouth

Location
- Country: United States
- State: California
- Region: Santa Cruz County, California

Physical characteristics
- Source: Atherton Peak in the southern Santa Cruz Mountains
  - location: 7 mi (11 km) east of Watsonville
  - coordinates: 36°56′16″N 121°38′58″W
  - elevation: 1,520 ft (460 m)
- Mouth: Pajaro River
  - location: 3 mi (5 km) east of Watsonville
  - coordinates: 36°54′50″N 121°42′44″W
  - elevation: 29 ft (8.8 m)
- Length: 6.1 mi (9.8 km)

Coward Creek is a 6.1-mile-long (9.8 km) stream originating on Atherton Peak in the southern Santa Cruz Mountains. It flows through Santa Cruz County until it joins the Pajaro River, which flows, in turn, to Monterey Bay and the Pacific Ocean.

== History ==
Coward Creek is named for John Rawson Coward, an early landowner registered to vote in the Pajaro precinct of Santa Cruz County in 1868 and a native of Maryland.

== Watershed and course ==
Coward Creek arises on the western slope of Atherton Mountain and flows westerly 3.6 miles (5.8 km) through Fern Canyon, Mill Canyon, Kinky Canyon and then Cummings Canyon along the southwest corner of the Santa Cruz Mountains, then turns south to flow 2.5 miles (4.0 km) to its confluence with the Pajaro River.

== Ecology and conservation ==
Coward Creek is the western end of the Pajaro River Gap, a critical linkage for wildlife east–west across the southern edge of the Santa Cruz Mountains and north–south from that range to the Gabilan Range to the south. It is mostly an intermittent stream today, although it is perennial in the upper reaches. However, those upper reaches did not host steelhead trout (Oncorhynchus mykiss) in a 1983 report.

== See also ==
- Pajaro River
- Santa Cruz Mountains
