= Melrose, Oregon =

Unincorporated community in the state of Oregon, United States

- Census-designated place (CDP)
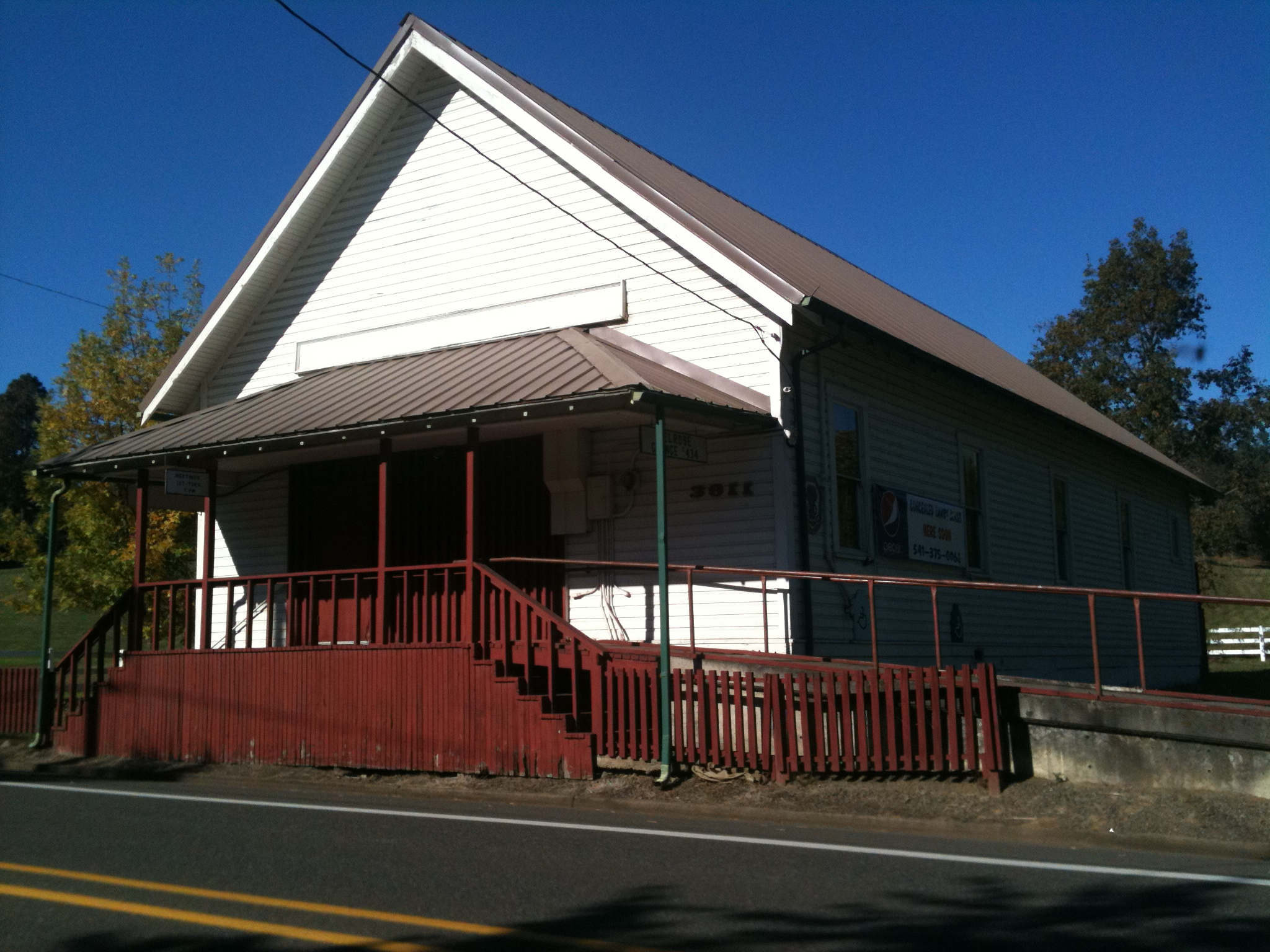
- The grange hall at Melrose

- Location within Oregon Location within the United States
- Coordinates: 43°14′44″N 123°27′22″W
- Country: United States
- State: Oregon
- County: Douglas

Area
  - Total: 4.35 sq mi (11.26 km^{2})
  - Land: 4.35 sq mi (11.26 km^{2})
  - Water: 0 sq mi (0.00 km^{2})
- Elevation: 446 ft (136 m)

Population (2020)
  - Total: 834
  - Density: 191.8/sq mi (74.05/km^{2})
- Time zone: UTC-8 (Pacific (PST))
  - Summer (DST): UTC-7 (PDT)
- ZIP code: 97471
- Area codes: 458 and 541
- FIPS code: 41-47350
- GNIS feature ID: 2611755

Melrose is an unincorporated community and census-designated place in Douglas County, Oregon, United States. As of the 2020 census, Melrose had a population of 834. It was named by Henry Scott for Melrose Abbey in Scotland. Its post office, at first named Hogan, was established on May 18, 1887, and James McKinney was the first postmaster. Named earlier on as French Settlement, Oregon.

== Demographics ==
Historical population
Census	Pop.	Note	%±
2020	834		—
U.S. Decennial Census
