= Mount Madonna =

Mountain in California, United States

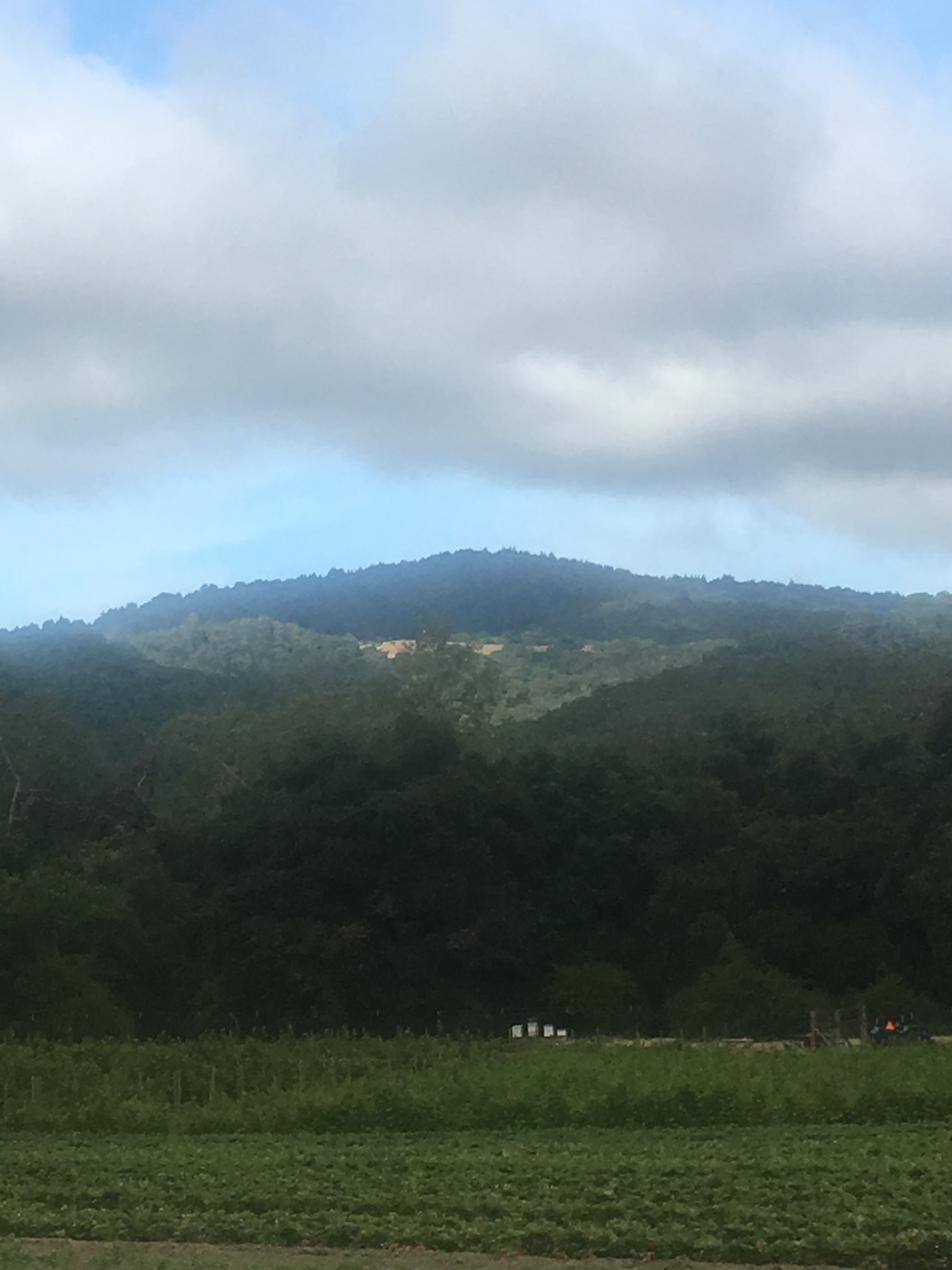
- View of Mount Madonna along Watsonville Road

Highest point
- Elevation: 1,900 ft (580 m) NAVD 88
- Prominence: 188 ft (57 m) NGVD 29
- Coordinates: 37°00′44″N 121°42′18″W

Geography
- Location within California Location within the United States
- Location: Santa Clara County, California, United States
- Parent range: Santa Cruz Mountains
- Topo map: USGS Mount Madonna

Mount Madonna is a prominent peak located near the southern end of the Santa Cruz Mountains in southwest Santa Clara County, California. The iconic landmark is surrounded by a county park, and is viewable along U.S. Route 101 in South Santa Clara Valley, and California State Route 152 near Watsonville in south Santa Cruz County.

== History ==
In the late 19th-century, cattle baron Henry Miller built a summer home near the summit.

== Mount Madonna County Park ==
Mount Madonna County Park is one of 28 Santa Clara County Parks. The 4,605-acre (1,864 ha) park surrounds the peak, with the east side facing Santa Clara Valley and the west side facing Monterey Bay. The park offers hiking and equestrian activities along its 14-mile (23 km) trail system, as well as an archery range and an amphitheater. Facilities for picnicking and overnight camping are also provided. It is one of a few parks in the area that allow dogs in the campgrounds.

== See also ==
- List of summits of the San Francisco Bay Area
