= Pajaro River =

River in California, United States

Pajaro River Río de San Antonio, Río del Pájaro
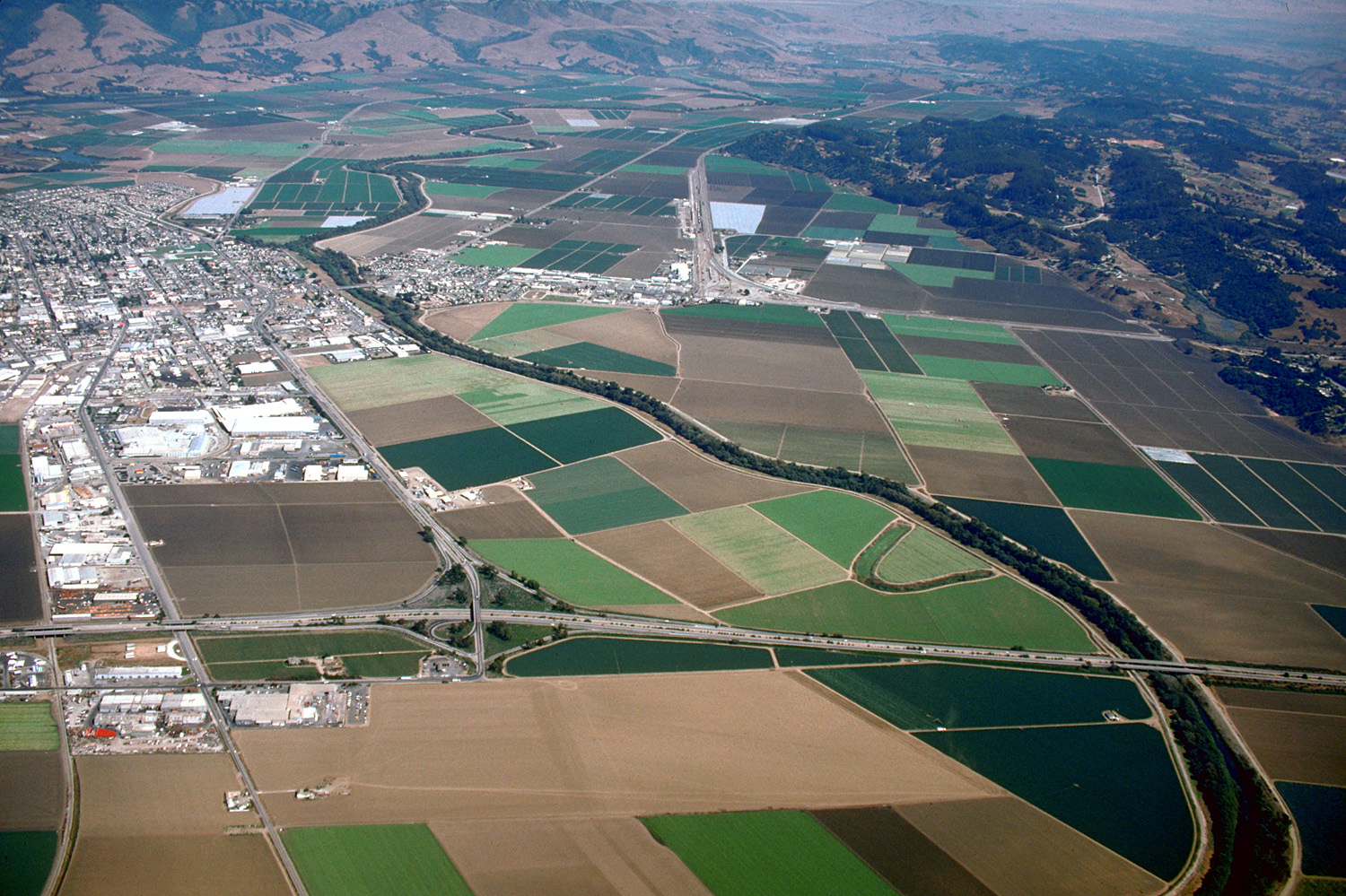
- Aerial view of the Pajaro River at Watsonville, California. The river empties into the Pacific Ocean about 2.5 miles (4 km) west of this photograph. View is to the east.

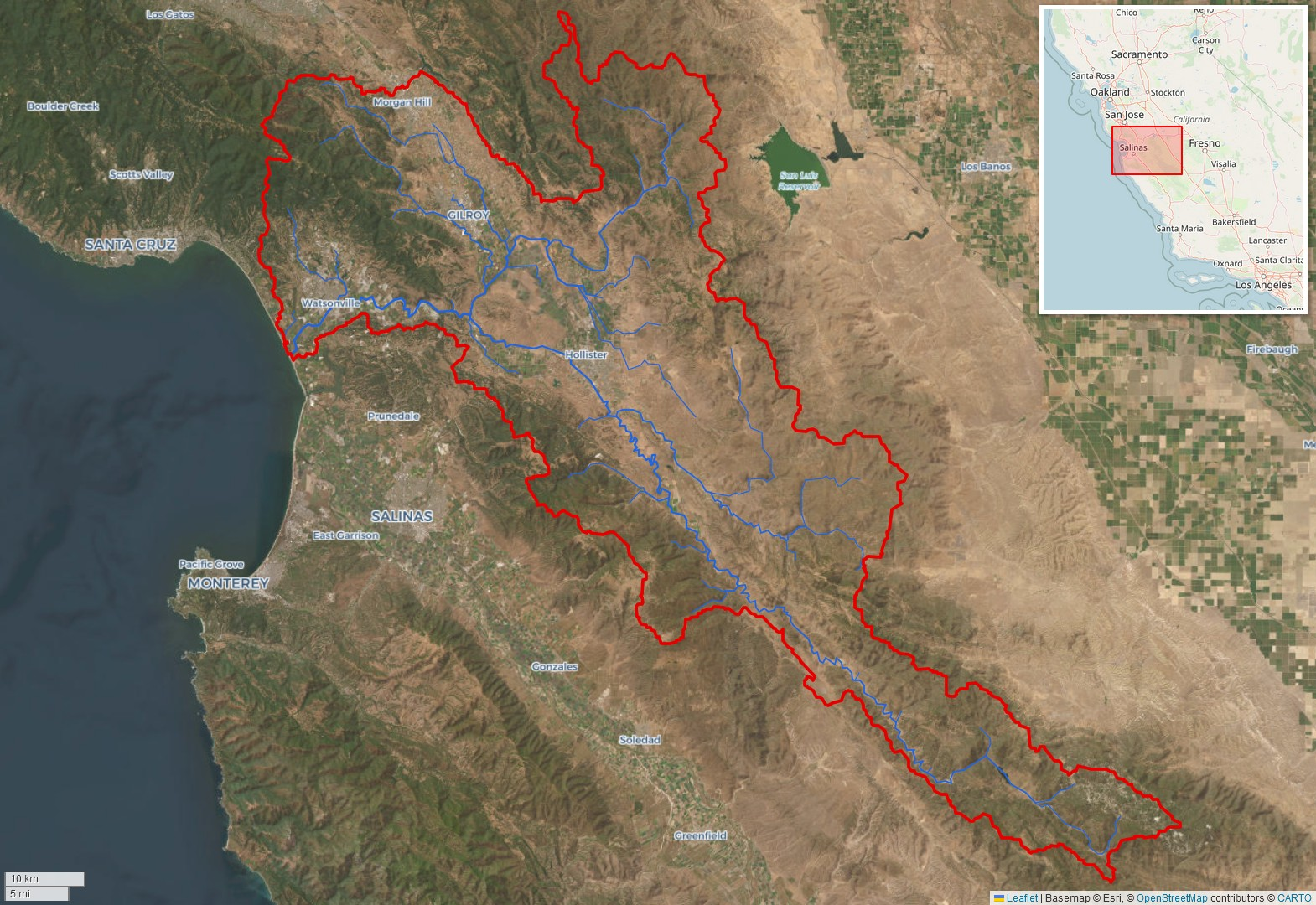
- Pajaro River watershed (Interactive map)
- Etymology: ‘Bird’ in Spanish

Location
- Country: United States
- State: California
- Region: Santa Cruz, Monterey, Santa Clara, and San Benito counties

Physical characteristics
- Source: San Felipe Lake
  - location: 7 mi (11 km) east of Gilroy
  - coordinates: 36°58′55″N 121°29′18″W
  - elevation: 146 ft (45 m)
- Mouth: Monterey Bay
  - location: 5 mi (8 km) southwest of Watsonville
  - coordinates: 36°51′00″N 121°48′35″W
  - elevation: 0 ft (0 m)
- Length: 30 mi (48 km)
- Basin size: 1,300 sq mi (3,400 km^{2})
- Discharge
  - location: Chittenden
  - average: 163 cu ft/s (4.6 m^{3}/s)
  - minimum: 0 cu ft/s (0 m^{3}/s)
  - maximum: 25,100 cu ft/s (710 m^{3}/s)

Basin features
- Tributaries
  - left: Pacheco Creek, San Benito River
  - right: Llagas Creek, Uvas Creek, Pescadero Creek, Coward Creek, Salsipuedes Creek

The Pajaro River (pájaro is bird in Spanish) is a U.S. river in the Central Coast region of California, forming part of the border between San Benito and Santa Clara Counties, the entire border between San Benito and Santa Cruz County, and the entire border between Santa Cruz and Monterey County. Flowing roughly east to west, the river empties into Monterey Bay, west of Watsonville, California.

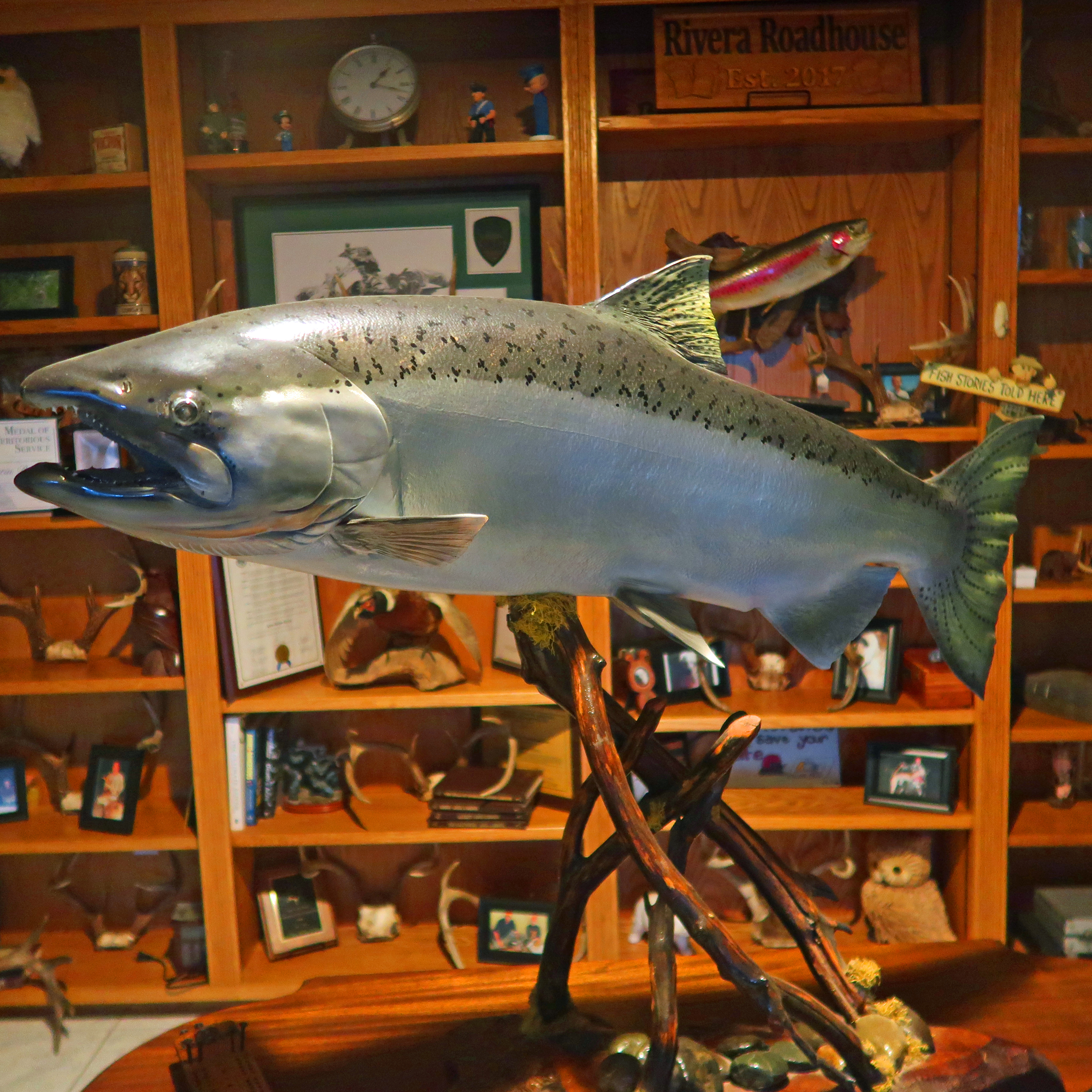
Last Chinook salmon caught in the Pajaro River watershed, at Uvas Creek near the intersection of Burchell and Watsonville Roads, west of Gilroy, California. The 40 lb. salmon was landed by Herman Garcia Sr. in 1953.

== History ==
The first European land exploration of Alta California, the Spanish Portolà expedition, camped near the river for two nights, in the vicinity of today's community of Watsonville, on October 8–9, 1769. The party continued north the next day toward Santa Cruz. Expedition soldiers called it "Pajaro" (meaning "bird" in Spanish). Franciscan missionary Juan Crespí, traveling with the expedition, noted in his diary that they "found half the body of a very large black bird, hanging [from] poles" (possibly a condor).

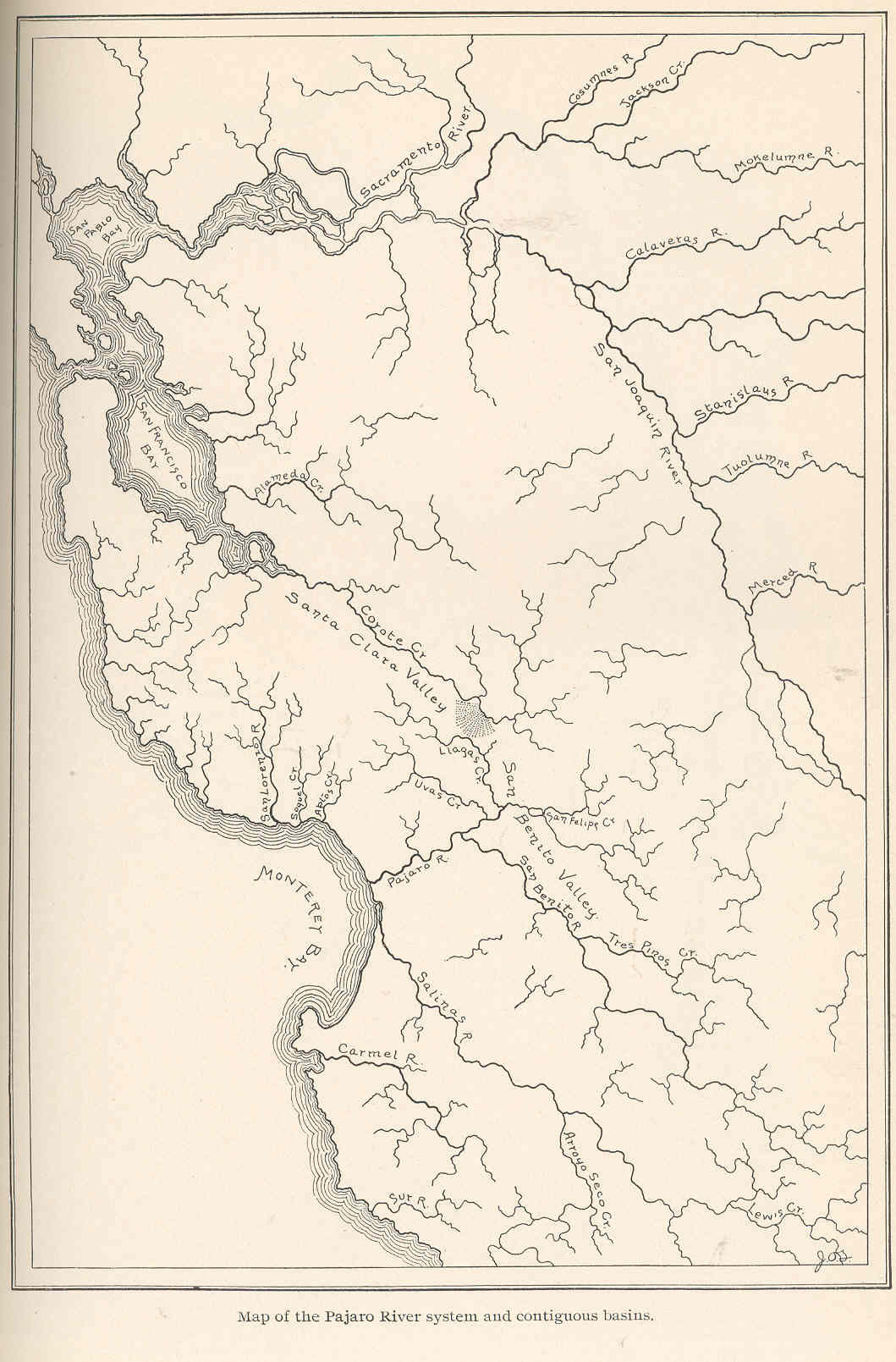
John Otterbein Snyder's 1914 Map of the Pajaro River and other watersheds tributary to Monterey Bay

The Pajaro River has had many names. Early Spanish maps had the name Rio de San Antonio and Rio del Pajaro. Alternate names included Pigeon River, Rio de La Senora La Santa Ana, Rio del Paxaro, Rio de Santa Ana, San Antonio River and Sanjon del Tequesquite.

In 1953 the State Water Resource Control Board determined that the Pajaro Valley Watershed suffered from saltwater intrusion due to groundwater overdraft. In the 1970s, the groundwater basin consistently fell below sea level, and was identified in 1980 as critically over-drafted. By the 21st century, 54 square miles of the Pajaro Watershed's groundwater supply was overdrawn and as a result, below sea level making the area susceptible to saltwater intrusion.

=== Flooding ===
The Pajaro River has a recurring history of flooding. The towns of Pajaro and Watsonville were built on the river's natural floodplain. Before the Army Corps of Engineers built the levees, flooding devastated homes, businesses, and agriculture. Since the $748,000 levees were constructed in 1949, there have been several instances of flooding from severe weather events and failed levees. In 1963, the USACE (United States Army Corps of Engineers) acknowledged poor planning in levee design, and congress authorized re-construction of the flood control system, however no funds were provided from the federal government.

Following the 1995 floods, several lawsuits were issued against the different counties and cities by farmers and homeowners affected. Santa Cruz County, Monterey County, and the California Department of Transportation were all held responsible for failing to maintain the Pajaro River during floods and sued by about 250 people. Plaintiffs held the counties responsible because in 1944, both counties made promises to maintain the levees implemented by the Army Corps of Engineers.

==== Timeline ====
Date	Flooding impacts
1890	A severe flood was enhanced when a rail bridge's pilings by the mouth of the river allowed for debris to accumulate and cease discharge to the ocean. As a result, the floods were remembered as the "Highest yet known" for the next 50 years.
1894	Flooding near the city of Watsonville, California
1907	Major flooding region wide.
1911	Each year experienced overflow near the city of Watsonville.
1914	Each year experienced overflow near the city of Watsonville.
1915	Each year experienced overflow near the city of Watsonville.
1916	Each year experienced overflow near the city of Watsonville.
1922	Each year experienced overflow near the city of Watsonville.
1927	Each year experienced overflow near the city of Watsonville.
1931	Each year experienced overflow near the city of Watsonville.
1933	Each year experienced overflow near the city of Watsonville.
1937	Each year experienced overflow near the city of Watsonville.
1938	Flooding
1949	(Army Corps of Engineers levee construction)
1955	Flooding
1963	Overflow near the city of Watsonville.
1982	Flooding of agricultural land at Llagas Creek at the Pajaro River bordering Santa Clara and San Benito Counties. Floodwaters at the confluence of Pajaro River and Carnadero Creek flooded agricultural lands in Santa Clara and San Benito counties. The Pajaro River inundated part of Watsonville and adjacent agricultural land. High stages in the Pajaro River blocked Watsonville drainage.
1983	Flooding in agricultural lands at the confluence of Pajaro River and Carnadero Creek.
1986	Significant flooding on the Pajaro River in February.
1995	All residences and businesses damaged; 2,500 evacuations Damage to 3,280 acres of agricultural crops along the Pajaro River were estimated at $67 million, and urban damages in Pajaro estimated at $28 million. Two persons drowned
1997	Flooding
1998	Town of Pajaro evacuated. The levee along the Pajaro River was breached in several places, and a Presidential disaster was declared.
2005	Town of Pajaro is flooded. Evacuation orders were never given until the flooding started. Resulting in stranded citizens. And much more unneeded loses.
2023	Town of Pajaro evacuated to surrounding shelters the following day. The levee along the Pajaro River breached at midnight on March 10 due to ongoing storms in the region and poor levee conditions.

== Geology ==
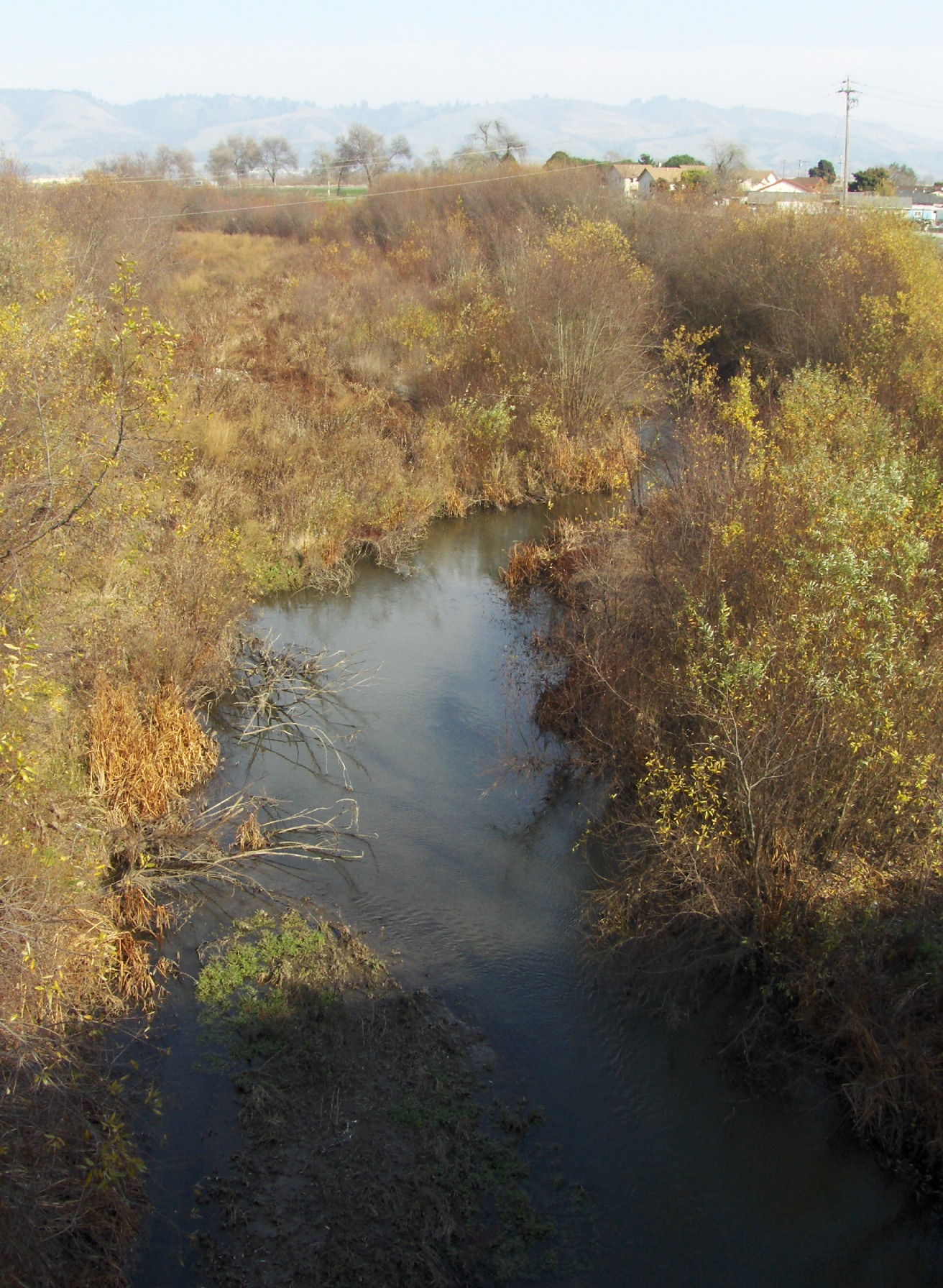
Pajaro riparian area

The San Andreas Fault line crosses the Pajaro River at the Pajaro Gap just east of Chittenden Pass and Logan, California (near Aromas) on California State Route 129. The Salinian Block rests above the Pacific Plate which slips north along the San Andreas Fault. It is made up of granitic material, and marine sediments.

The Pajaro River has a history of changing its course due to the San Andreas fault slippage between the Pacific plate and the North American Plate. At another time it flowed into the Elkhorn Slough in Moss Landing, California, then into the Pacific Ocean, but today it joins with Corralitos Creek to discharge into the Pacific at a slightly more north location.

The 1989 Loma Prieta earthquake in the Santa Cruz Mountains deformed the Pajaro levee system.

Other faults within the watershed are the Zayante fault, Sargent Fault, and Calaveras fault.

A. R. Wilson Granite Rock quarry is located by the Pajaro gap adjacent to the river in San Benito County.

== Geography ==
Due to the geology in the area, the geomorphology of the watershed is unique. The river begins at Diablo range in the east. In the south, from the Gabilan mountains flows another tributary northward. From the north, tributaries flow from the Santa Cruz mountains southward to meet with the Pajaro.

=== Climate ===
The climate of the region is Mediterranean. Watsonville annual high temperatures reach 68 °F (20 °C) and lows of 47 °F (8 °C). The average temperature is around 57 °F (14 °C) and average annual precipitation (essentially all in the form of rainfall) is about 23.5 inches (600 mm).

Certain tributaries frequently run dry due to a lack of rainfall in the summer.

== Watershed ==
The watershed is approximately 1,300 square miles (3,400 km^{2}) and covers portions of Santa Cruz, Santa Clara, San Benito, and Monterey Counties. The Pajaro River mainstem begins just west of San Felipe Lake, also called Upper Soap Lake, which is a permanent natural lake formed by the confluence of Pacheco Creek, Tequisquita Slough and Ortega Creek. Pacheco Creek's headwaters are in the Diablo Range at about 400 feet (120 m) elevation. The Pajaro River mainstream flows west for 30 miles (50 km), passing the city of Watsonville and emptying into Monterey Bay. Lower Soap Lake, also called Soap Lake, is an intermittent body of water a few miles downstream of the upper lake. This type of water body forms when the channel below is unable to keep up with the flow coming from upstream. The San Andreas Fault divides the watershed and is responsible for altering historical flow paths.

=== Upper watershed ===
San Felipe Lake lies just south of the Santa Clara County line in San Benito County, just south of Highway 152 east of Gilroy at the foot of the Diablo Range. The lake is a sag pond dammed by the fault scarp of the Calaveras Fault, which forms a natural dike along the western shoreline. It is perennial in all but the driest years, e.g. 1977. San Felipe Lake used to be 50% larger until the man-made North and South Outflow canals, which drain to the Miller Canal, were cut through the western rim in 1874.

The Pajaro River's largest tributary is the San Benito River which is much longer than the Pajaro, flowing northwest from its source at an elevation of 4,760 feet (1,450 m) on San Benito Mountain on its course between the Diablo Range and the Gabilan Range, traveling for about 65 miles (105 km) before its confluence with the Pajaro River, about 15 miles (24 km) upstream from the ocean. The lowest tributary of the Pajaro River is Salsipuedes Creek which drains the Corralitos Creek and Salsipuedes Creek sub-basins.

=== Lower watershed ===
The lower watershed is in Santa Cruz and Monterey Counties which currently have levee systems. The original river system was Corralitos Creek, fed by Aromas Creek. The Pajaro river has taken over this system, and Corralitos Creek is now only a tributary.

A residential development, agricultural fields, and Zmudowski State Beach border the Pajaro River mouth and the connecting Watsonville Slough. The river mouth is often open to tidal action for extended periods, especially during the winter months. Should the mouth fill with sediment, it must be physically reopened to prevent nearby agricultural fields from flooding.

The main water source for agriculture and drinking water in the region comes from groundwater. The three primary aquifers in the Pajaro Watershed are the Alluvial, the Aromas, and the Purisma aquifers. All three suffer from seawater intrusion due to groundwater overdraft, the worst affected being the Aromas aquifer. The Alluvial aquifer is heavily polluted by agricultural runoff.

=== Water quality ===
The river is heavily polluted by people dumping illegally. One cleanup in 2015 revealed over 1,000 tires, five boats, two trucks, and tons of trash.

High toxicity levels in the river are a result from agriculture in the watershed. During low flows, organophosphate pesticides have been detected in the river, and organochlorine pesticides have been detected post-high surface runoff events. Toxaphene, DDT, and Diazinon have also been detected at concentrations unhealthy to local aquatic species.

== Ecology ==
In 2006, the Pajaro River was designated as "America's Most Endangered River" by the American Rivers organization, "due to levees" constructed by the Army Corps of Engineers along its lower 22 miles (35 km) and severe runoff into the river from agricultural fields.

There are six species listed as threatened or California species of special concern (SSC) under the CESA that regularly occur and/or breed near or in the Pajaro River. Western pond turtles (Actinemys marmorata), pallid bat (Antrozous pallidus), burrowing owls (Athene cunicularia), dusky-footed woodrat (Neotoma fuscipes), least Bell's vireo (Vireo bellii pusillus), and the yellow-breasted chat (Icteria virens). Four species are listed as threatened or endangered under the federal Endangered Species Act of 1973 (ESA) that are present or for which suitable habitat exists in or adjacent to the Pajaro River. Steelhead trout, the California red-legged frog (Rana draytonii), the Northern tidewater goby (Eucyclogobius newberryi,), and the snowy plover (Anarhynchus nivosus), which nests at the Pajaro river mouth at Zumdowski State Beach at the Pacific Ocean.

Native California fish present in the lower Pajaro River are: three-spined stickleback (Gasterosteus aculeatus microcephalus), Sacramento perch (Archoplites interruptus), riffle sculpin (Cottus gulosus), Russian River tule perch (Hysterocarpus traskii traskii), South Central California Coast steelhead trout (Oncorhynchus mykiss), and thicktail chub (Siphatales crassicauda).

The Pajaro River serves as a migration pathway for adult steelhead trout migrating to spawning and nursery habitat in the upper watersheds of the Pajaro's tributaries (Corralitos, Uvas, Llagas and Pacheco Creeks), although the Pajaro River mainstem itself provides poor spawning and rearing habitat due to low summer flows and high sedimentation loads. In a 1912 report, Stanford University ichthyologist John Otterbein Snyder indicated that there were reports of Chinook salmon (Oncorhynchus tschawytscha) in the Pajaro River watershed. However, his 1909 seine nets obtained no small specimens at his collecting stations. In 1953, local Gilroy resident, Herman Garcia Sr., caught a Chinook salmon in the Uvas Creek tributary of the Pajaro River. Although the image shows no adipose fin, California's hatcheries were not clipping adipose fins until the 1970s, so it may be an artifact of the taxidermy. However, citizen naturalist and author William "Bill" Leikam reported salmon in Corralitos Creek while fishing for steelhead trout in 1956 in the reach along Freedom, California at the season's first large winter storms. Two adult Chinook salmon 60 centimetres (24 in) and 65 centimetres (26 in) long were caught by gill net and released in a 2005 study of San Felipe Lake, although these may have been fall-run Chinook from hatchery net-pen operations that released these fish at Moss Landing. Snyder did not report Coho salmon (Oncorhyncus kisutch) south of the San Lorenzo River, 25 miles (40 km) north of the Pajaro River mouth on the California coast.

Historically, the Pajaro River is one of two Northern California coastal rivers mentioned in 1829 by Russian explorer K. T. Khlebnikov as hosting sturgeon, presumably white sturgeon (Acipenser transmontanus), along with the Russian River.

San Felipe Lake, which is the central feature of the "Bolsa de San Felipe", is designated as a "California Important Bird Area" by the National Audubon Society. The Bolsa is a crossroads for birds migrating between San Francisco Bay to the north, Monterey Bay to the west and the Central Valley to the east. The Bolsa is also identified by the National Audubon Society as a "bird vagrant trap", a site where bird species far outside of their normal range appear. Also noteworthy is perhaps the southernmost record of North American river otter (Lontra canadensis) in a California coastal watershed. In 1969 river otter were recorded eating freshwater mussels (California floater (Anodonta californiensis)) on the Santa Ana Creek tributary of Tequisquita Slough, 2 miles east of Hollister.

== Improvements ==
In 2010 the City of Watsonville was awarded a $424,000 grant to create a public access point for canoes and kayaks, including a parking lot, trail, and public restrooms.

The Pajaro River CARE project was funded by the California Natural Resources Agency.

The Pajaro River Watershed Integrated Regional Water Management Plan (IRWMP) is a movement by the Pajaro Valley Water Management Agency (PVWMA), San Benito County Water District (SBCWD), and Santa Clara Valley Water District (SCVWD) to join in order to create and benefit the watershed as a whole.

The Pajaro River Bench Excavation Project which was approved in 2012 will remove excess sediment and vegetation from the bench in order to better allow flow through the levees to improve flood protection. Approximately 336,000 cubic yards will be removed. The project begins at Murphy's crossing, and extends 7.5 miles westward to the Pacific Ocean ending before highway 1.

The state of California allocated $7.6 million to the Pajaro watershed to pay for water projects. One project funded was the building of two 1 million gallon storage tanks for the waste water recycling plant which provides water to local agriculture in the Valley.

In early 2015, a land purchase in the upper Pajaro Watershed was purchased by Santa Clara Valley Open Space Authority in an effort to preserve agriculture, and increase floodplain and wildlife protection in Santa Clara County. This land is where Llagas Creek and the Pajaro River intersect, with about 183 total acres. The intention is to leave the land undeveloped, thereby reducing risk of flooding for the lower watershed. It is also intended to preserve and restore habitat corridors linking the Santa Cruz, Gabilan, and Mt. Hamilton Ranges.
