= Forest Home Historic District =

Historic district in New York, United States

- U.S. National Register of Historic Places
- U.S. Historic district
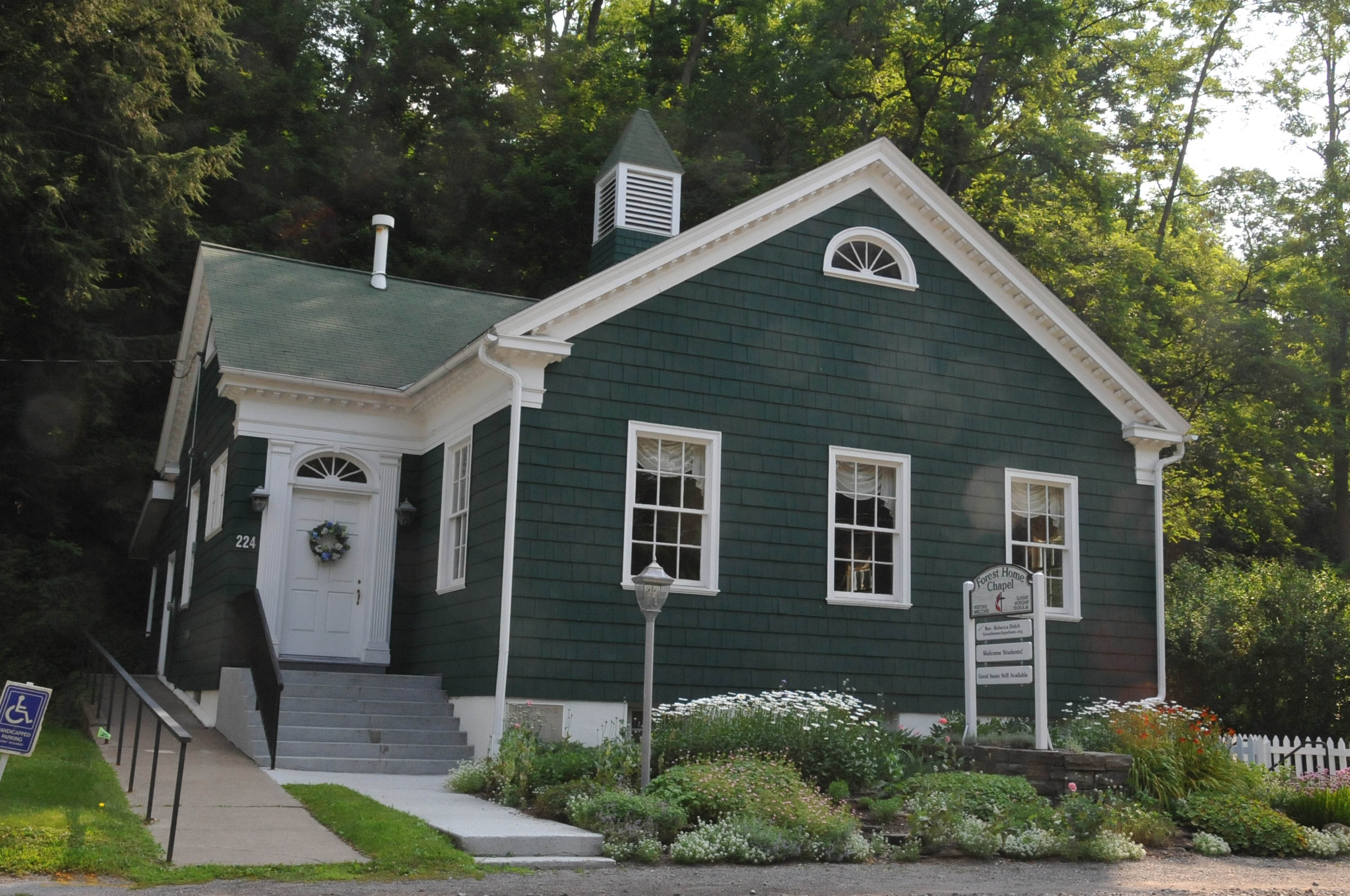

- Location within New York Location within the United States
- Location: Roughly along NY392, Forest Home, New York
- Coordinates: 42°27′6″N 76°28′11″W
- Area: 50 acres (20 ha)
- Architectural style: Federal, Greek Revival, Queen Anne
- NRHP reference No.: 98000999
- Added to NRHP: August 06, 1998

Forest Home Historic District is a national historic district located at Forest Home in Tompkins County, New York. The district consists of 66 contributing buildings, four contributing sites (three bridges and a dam), and two contributing sites (archaeological remains of former grist mills). The historic building stock consists primarily of one- to two-story frame dwellings on relatively small, irregularly shaped lots.

It was listed on the National Register of Historic Places in 1998.
