= French Settlement, Oregon =

Coordinates: 43°14′51″N 123°27′32″W

French Settlement is the original name of Melrose, Oregon and its neighbouring valleys in Douglas County including Flournoy, Garden and Coles valleys. It is along the west side of the South Umpqua River South of its fork, a few miles West of Roseburg in Southern Oregon, West of Interstate 5. It roughly occupies a stretch of 8 miles by 4 miles of lush fertile well irrigated soil. The first American newcomers gave the location such a generic name based on the ethnicity or language spoken by the original settlers, namely French Canadians.

French Settlement is also known as an early mixed ancestry settlement, or at least an attempt, in the Pacific Northwest history, sometimes referred as a French Canadian or a Métis settlement. Although relationships have been generally harmonious, intermarrying between the original French speaking core settlers and other European ethnic newcomer groups did not occur until the late 1970s. This rare reference narrative on French Settlement limits the early settlers to only those who never married into local Indian tribes (nor to half-breeds natives from earlier occupation during the fur trade period). Earlier land occupants leftover from the fur trade era were deemed squatters to eradicate and certainly not identified. In addition, scholar Jean Barman identified through the Catholic church records a whole slew of sons and daughters of French Prairie earliest pioneers intermarrying and heading to French Settlement vicinity having temporarily acted as a magnet. This although quickly came to an end when hunted down by vigilantes during the 1855 Indian Wars period if not forcefully resettled into Grand Ronde reservation or escaping further into the Pacific Northwest back-country such as around Frenchtown, Washington. The Oregon earliest pioneer families at stake were the Rivet, Bellique, Bercier, Despard, Desportes McKay, Dompierre, Gagnon, Gervais, Gingras, Grégoire, Groslouis, Perrault, Picard and Pichette. Only one native group was able to make it through and the Cow Creek band regained recognition in 1982 on the basis of seven mixed ancestry families hiding for several decades around French Settlement. Many ethnic communities had therefore been competing early on for the most valuable land of Southern Oregon in and around French Settlement.

== History ==
The Hudson's Bay Company was the first newcomer to trap the area in the 1830s and trade with various Indigenous groups. A first Fort Umpqua was built in 1832 close by North on the Umpqua River. French Canadian Jean-Baptiste Gagnier ran the isolated post and had partnered with the Umpqua chief's daughter Angélique. The area became quickly trapped out but Gagnier had built self-reliance cultivating "about 50 acres of land, wheat, corn potatoes and most kinds of vegetables" with the help of the local Siuslaw people. Numerous fur trade engagés had gone by en route to Northern California via the Siskiyou fur brigade Trail. Ewing Young passed by using the trail to bring horses and mules in 1834, and ran a cattle drive in 1837. The Charles Wilkes United States Exploring Expedition also passed by in 1841. Many noticed a remarkable area to move to someday. By 1846, Gagnier had grown a herd of "46 horses, 64 heads of cattle and 45 hogs".

Starting summer 1848, most men in Oregon including French Prairie and the Umpqua area left for the California gold rush to generally return worse off with others now heading North into mining. Missouri born French Huguenot Hoy Bernard Flournoy had surveyed the French Settlement area earlier on in 1846 and was one of them. Flournoy convinced four other "Frenchmen" to apply for donation land claims and settle with him by 1851 in the desirable location spotted earlier on. David Grenot had first arrived during his youth in eastern French speaking Canada from France. French Canadian Lapointe, Champagne and Archambeau were the others. LaBrie and LaRaut followed a year later after the initial group went back to bring over their own families. Soon joined by the Fenn, the Scott and the Conn, of different ethnicity toward a newly emerging American English speaking melting pot.

Amongst earlier fur trade visitors were Alexandre Dumont and Joseph Laverdure. Mixed ancestry Dumont was born in present-day Green Bay, Wisconsin from a French Canadian father and a Saulteaux Indigenous mother. Laverdure had a similar background. By 1854, Dumont was successfully claiming as an "American half-breed Indian born in Green Bay" an 483 acres donation land in the Umpqua with his wife Chewelah Josephte Finlay of similar mix. Laverdure acted similarly with Walla Walla chief's daughter Lizette. Later arrival Pierre Parizeau from Montreal partnered with the mixed ancestry daughter of a fur trader and similarly settled. Intermingling with local Indigenous people was no longer possible as devastating wars with the Umpqua tribes occurred in the 1850s. The local Indigenous population was decimated and most of what was left forcefully resettled by 1856 in the Grand Ronde Reservation. The region was in general duress. Seven mixed Indigenous families resisting relocation nonetheless hid in the Upper Umpqua Valley as "masked exterminators rode out of the mining camps trying to kill every Indian they could find": Dumont, Rondeau (twice over), Rainville, Pariseau, LaChance, and Thomason. They scraped out a living in what a descendant called the "edge of frontier society in Douglas County", around French Settlement. New waves of French Canadians of mixed ancestry with suitable experience were able to settle. Sons and daughters of the original French Prairie settlers under incoming newcomers pressure from the Oregon Trail resupplied the vicinity of French Settlement. Upkeeps obligations on the land claimed were daunting in a vigilante plagued area. New waves of American settlers also followed and some of the mixed ancestry people would end up in Grand Ronde.

Small scale farming was conducted along with raising common farm animal stock. Wheat was grown and milled in nearby Cleveland.

Nearby Roseburg located across the river was founded in 1851 under the name Deer Creek. The Catholic mission of St. Stephen the Martyr and the parish of Saint-Joseph were established in 1853 and 1867 under Archbishop François Norbert Blanchet and Father Alphonsus Glorieux. People of Catholic faith in and around French Settlement were catered to by a visiting priest. Mass was often performed in the open air, along with makeshift cemetery and schooling. The early French speaking settlers made up for these shortcomings by regularly holding lively week-end gatherings. A School District operated in the area under the name French Settlement from 1886 to 1930. The original school built in was dismantled in 1921. A French Settler school operated until the early 1960s. A post office briefly operated in 1874 under the name French Settlement. By 1890, French Settlement had much been renamed to Melrose.
