= European Quarter =

A European Quarter (also: "European District", "EU Quarter" and other variations or by the French: Quartier européen) usually refers to an area of a city containing a concentration of pan-European institutions (notably, those of the European Union and Council of Europe). At present, there are three such quarters;

- The European Quarter of Brussels, Belgium
- The European Quarter of Strasbourg, France
- The European Quarter of the city of Luxembourg, Luxembourg
