= Forest Springs, Missouri =

Unincorporated community in Missouri, United States

Coordinates: 40°11′10″N 91°57′19″W

Forest Springs is an extinct town in Knox County, in the U.S. state of Missouri. The GNIS classifies it as a populated place.

Forest Springs had its start in 1882 when a mineral spa opened at the site. A post office called Forest Springs was established in 1882, the name was changed to Forestsprings in 1895, and the post office closed in 1899.
