= Frenchtown (unincorporated community), Maryland =

Unincorporated community in Maryland, United States

Frenchtown, Maryland
- Unincorporated community
- Location within the State of Maryland Frenchtown (the United States)
- Coordinates: 39°34′31″N 76°04′54″W
- Country: United States
- State: Maryland
- County: Cecil
- Elevation: 20 ft (6.1 m)
- Time zone: UTC-5 (Eastern (EST))
  - Summer (DST): UTC-4 (EDT)
- ZIP codes: 21903
- Area code: 410/443
- GNIS feature ID: 590253

Frenchtown is an unincorporated community immediately north of Perryville in Cecil County, Maryland, United States.
