= Fish Rock, California =

Unincorporated community in California, United States

Fish Rock
- Unincorporated community
- Location in California Fish Rock (the United States)
- Coordinates: 38°48′18″N 123°35′07″W
- Country: United States
- State: California
- County: Mendocino
- Elevation: 171 ft (52 m)

Fish Rock (formerly, Fishrock and Conways Landing) was a historical unincorporated community in Mendocino County, California, United States. It was located 4 miles (6.4 km) northwest of Gualala, at an elevation of 171 feet (52 m).

The Conways Landing post office opened in 1870, changed its name to Fish Rock in 1871, closed in 1873, re-opened in 1885, moved in 1908, and closed permanently in 1910.

Fish Rock had a lumber chute used to load timber onto schooners. By 1938 the town was largely abandoned. The beach at Fish Rock was used for filming of the Island of the Blue Dolphins.
