= Flumeville, California =

Archaic placename in California, United States

Flumeville Rollerville
- Unincorporated community
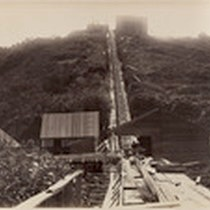
- Lumber hoist - Garcia River 1886

- Location in California Flumeville (the United States)
- Coordinates: 38°55′46″N 123°42′35″W
- Country: United States
- State: California
- County: Mendocino
- Elevation: 190 ft (58 m)

Flumeville, now more commonly known as Rollerville or Rollerville Junction, is an archaic placename in Mendocino County, California, United States. It is located 1.5 miles (2.4 km) north-northwest of Point Arena, at an elevation of 190 feet (58 m).

The site where the Flumeville bridge crosses the Garcia River was a Pomo village site called pda'haū, later known as the Manchester ranchería, or Garcia River ranchería. Flumeville was also known as Rollville or Rollerville, or was marked on old maps as "Hoisting Works", and was the site of the Garcia Mill. Lumber mill workers created a massive water wheel and flume to float logs via raised water troughs to the Pacific Ocean. In the early 20th century the very small town of Flumeville (or Rollerville) was a railroad stop. The flume was demolished in 1915.

The former site of Flumeville is now "the turnoff west to Point Arena Lighthouse from Shoreline Highway". Flumeville Bridge and Rollerville Junction Campground (also known as Flumeville Campground) are used by recreational fishermen seeking steelhead trout.
