= French Quarter (disambiguation) =

The French Quarter is the oldest section of the city of New Orleans, Louisiana, United States.

French Quarter may also refer to:

- French Quarter, Philadelphia, Pennsylvania, United States
- French Quarter (Charleston, South Carolina), United States
- Belden Place, sometimes called the French Quarter, San Francisco, California, United States
- French Quarter, or Ville Blanche, in Puducherry, India
- French Quarter (film), a 1978 American drama film

French quarter, the generic term, is also widely used, often as a historical reference; see for instance:

- Soho, the French Huguenot quarter of London, England, in the 17th and 18th centuries
- Ba Đình District, the former French quarter of Hanoi, Vietnam
- Saint Boniface, Winnipeg, Manitoba, Canada
- Seton Hill Historic District, the historic French quarter of Baltimore, Maryland, United States

== See also ==
- French Quarter Festival
- French Settlement
- French Concession
- Frenchtown (disambiguation)
