= Forest Home, California =

Forest Home
- Former settlement
- Location in California
- Coordinates: 38°27′54″N 120°57′51″W
- Country: United States
- State: California
- County: Amador
- Elevation: 581 ft (177 m)

Forest Home is a former settlement in Amador County, California, United States. It was located 6.25 miles (10.1 km) west of Plymouth, at an elevation of 581 feet (177 m). It still appeared on USGS maps as of 1944.

Forest Home began as a gold mining center, north of Ione. Both placer and hydraulic mining was conducted. After the gold petered out, copper mining began.

A post office operated at Forest Home from 1862 to 1905, moving once in 1886.
