= Forest Springs, Santa Cruz County, California =

Coordinates: 37°08′20″N 122°08′56″W

Forest Springs is a community in Boulder Creek, California.
