= Fruto, California =

Unincorporated community in California, United States

Fruto
- Unincorporated community
- Location in California Fruto (the United States)
- Coordinates: 39°35′24″N 122°27′00″W
- Country: United States
- State: California
- County: Glenn
- Elevation: 610 ft (186 m)

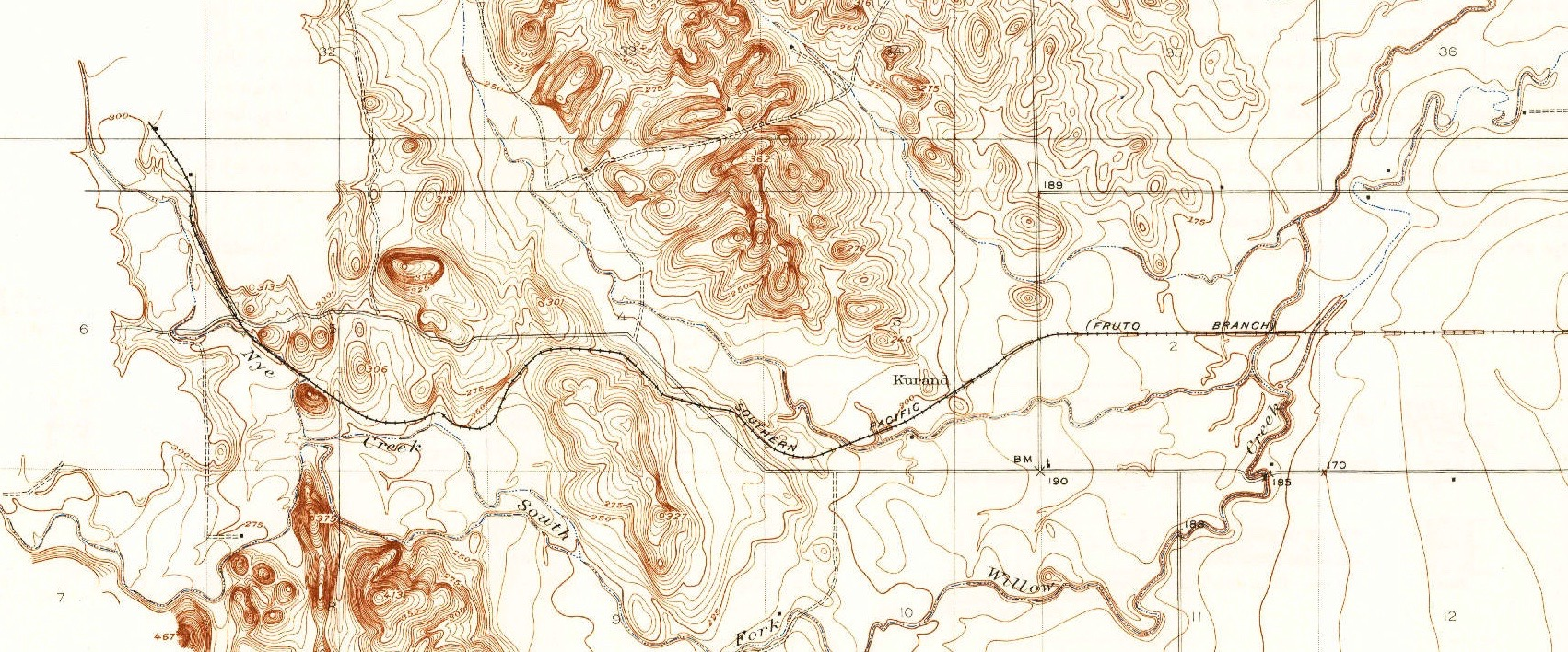
West Side and Mendocino Railroad 1917 with Fruto as the western terminus

Fruto is an unincorporated community in Glenn County, California, United States. It is located 14 miles (23 km) west-northwest of Willows, at an elevation of 610 feet (186 m). Fruto is located along State Route 162. Fruto was established in 1888 as the terminus of the Westside and Mendocino Railroad company (later bought by the Southern Pacific Railroad) and was a shipping point for fruit and wool grown in the area.

The Southern Pacific once had a depot, machine shed, small yard, and turntable at Fruto. The branch from Willows ran 17 miles, mainly along State Route 162. The branch was removed in 1951, except for a six-mile portion outside Willows which is operated by the California Northern Railroad and serves a fiberglass plant. A post office operated at Fruto from 1888 to 1953.

== Climate ==
According to the Köppen Climate Classification system, Fruto has a warm-summer Mediterranean climate, abbreviated "Csa" on climate maps.
