= Frenchtown Township, Antelope County, Nebraska =

Frenchtown Township
- Township
- Location in Antelope County
- Coordinates: 42°13′13″N 098°14′33″W
- Country: United States
- State: Nebraska
- County: Antelope

Area
  - Total: 35.76 sq mi (92.61 km^{2})
  - Land: 35.58 sq mi (92.15 km^{2})
  - Water: 0.18 sq mi (0.46 km^{2}) 0.50%
- Elevation: 1,831 ft (558 m)

Population (2010)
  - Total: 159
  - Density: 4.4/sq mi (1.7/km^{2})
- GNIS feature ID: 0838011

Frenchtown Township is one of twenty-four townships in Antelope County, Nebraska, United States. The population was 159 at the 2010 census.

A large share of the early settlers being French people caused the name to be selected.
