= Frenchtown-Rumbly, Maryland =

- CDP
- Coordinates: 38°4′57″N 75°51′46″W
- Country: United States
- State: Maryland
- County: Somerset

Area
  - Total: 8.39 sq mi (21.74 km^{2})
  - Land: 3.76 sq mi (9.73 km^{2})
  - Water: 4.64 sq mi (12.01 km^{2})

Population (2020)
  - Total: 86
  - Density: 22.9/sq mi (8.84/km^{2})
- Time zone: UTC−5 (Eastern (EST))
  - Summer (DST): UTC−4 (EDT)
- ZIP code: 21871
- Area codes: 410 and 443 and 667
- FIPS code: 24-30567

Frenchtown-Rumbly is a census-designated place in Somerset County, Maryland, United States. The population was 96 at the 2000 census. It is included in the Salisbury, Maryland-Delaware Metropolitan Statistical Area.

== Geography ==
Frenchtown-Rumbly is located at 38°4′57″N 75°51′46″W (38.082475, −75.862791).

According to the United States Census Bureau, the CDP has a total area of 8.4 square miles (22 km^{2}), of which 4.2 square miles (11 km^{2}) is land and 4.2 square miles (11 km^{2}) (50.36%) is water.

== Demographics ==
Historical population
Census	Pop.	Note	%±
2000	96		—
2020	86		—
U.S. Decennial Census

As of the census of 2000, there were 96 people, 47 households, and 29 families residing in the CDP. The population density was 23.1 inhabitants per square mile (8.9/km^{2}). There were 97 housing units at an average density of 23.4 per square mile (9.0/km^{2}). The racial makeup of the CDP was 95.83% White and 4.17% African American.

There were 47 households, out of which 19.1% had children under the age of 18 living with them, 53.2% were married couples living together, 8.5% had a female householder with no husband present, and 36.2% were non-families. 31.9% of all households were made up of individuals, and 12.8% had someone living alone who was 65 years of age or older. The average household size was 2.04 and the average family size was 2.57.

In the CDP, the population was spread out, with 19.8% under the age of 18, 26.0% from 25 to 44, 32.3% from 45 to 64, and 21.9% who were 65 years of age or older. The median age was 48 years. For every 100 females, there were 104.3 males. For every 100 females age 18 and over, there were 97.4 males.

The median income for a household in the CDP was $28,542, and the median income for a family was $28,750. Males had a median income of $16,250 versus $0 for females. The per capita income for the CDP was $15,430. There were no families and 14.3% of the population living below the poverty line, including no under eighteens and none of those over 64.
