= Interlaken, California =

Interlaken
- Census-designated place
- Location in Santa Cruz County and the state of California

- Location in the United States
- Coordinates: 36°57′23″N 121°44′44″W
- Country: United States
- State: California
- County: Santa Cruz
- Named for: Interlaken

Area
  - Total: 10.198 sq mi (26.412 km^{2})
  - Land: 9.804 sq mi (25.391 km^{2})
  - Water: 0.394 sq mi (1.021 km^{2}) 3.87%
- Elevation: 128 ft (39 m)

Population (April 1, 2020)
  - Total: 7,368
  - Density: 751.6/sq mi (290.2/km^{2})
- Time zone: UTC-8 (Pacific Time Zone)
  - Summer (DST): UTC-7 (PDT)
- ZIP code: 95076
- Area code: 831
- FIPS code: 06-36613
- GNIS feature ID: 1867031

Interlaken is a census-designated place (CDP) in Santa Cruz County, California, United States. The population was 7,368 at the 2020 census.

== Name ==
Interlaken is named for the town of Interlaken, Switzerland, meaning "among the lakes". Like its namesake, it is situated amongst College Lake, Pinto Lake, Kelly Lake, Lake Tynan, and Drew Lake.

== Geography ==
Interlaken is located at 36°57′23″N 121°44′44″W (36.956293, -121.745433).

According to the United States Census Bureau, the CDP has a total area of 10.2 square miles (26 km^{2}), of which 9.8 square miles (25 km^{2}) (96.13%) is land and 0.4 square miles (1.0 km^{2}) (3.87%) is water.

=== Climate ===
Interlaken has a warm summer Mediterranean climate (Köppen climate classification Csb) typical of coastal areas of California. Based on those records, average January temperatures range between 61.5 °F (16.4 °C) and 40.0 °F (4.4 °C), and average September temperatures range between 74.9 °F (23.8 °C) and 52.4 °F (11.3 °C). Annual precipitation averages 30.29 inches (769 mm).

There are an average of 63.4 days annually with measurable precipitation, most of which falls from October through May. Summer fogs often produce light drizzle in the night and morning hours. Condensation from the fogs also produces fog drip from trees overnight. No measurable snowfall has been recorded since records began.

Climate data for Interlaken, California
Month	Jan	Feb	Mar	Apr	May	Jun	Jul	Aug	Sep	Oct	Nov	Dec	Year
Mean daily maximum °F (°C)	61.5 (16.4)	62.7 (17.1)	64.5 (18.1)	67.8 (19.9)	70.3 (21.3)	72.9 (22.7)	73.2 (22.9)	74.1 (23.4)	74.9 (23.8)	72.5 (22.5)	66.4 (19.1)	60.8 (16.0)	68.5 (20.3)
Mean daily minimum °F (°C)	40.0 (4.4)	42.5 (5.8)	43.9 (6.6)	45.3 (7.4)	48.4 (9.1)	51.4 (10.8)	53.6 (12.0)	53.9 (12.2)	52.4 (11.3)	48.7 (9.3)	43.6 (6.4)	40.0 (4.4)	47.0 (8.3)
Average precipitation inches (mm)	4.8 (120)	5.0 (130)	3.6 (91)	1.6 (41)	0.7 (18)	0.1 (2.5)	0.0 (0.0)	0.0 (0.0)	0.2 (5.1)	1.1 (28)	2.8 (71)	4.6 (120)	24.5 (626.6)
Average snowfall inches (cm)	0.05 (0.13)	0.05 (0.13)	0 (0)	0 (0)	0 (0)	0 (0)	0 (0)	0 (0)	0 (0)	0 (0)	0 (0)	0.05 (0.13)	0.15 (0.39)
Average precipitation days	11	11	10	7	5	2	0	0	2	4	9	11	72
Average snowy days	0.05	0.05	0	0	0	0	0	0	0	0	0	0.05	0.15

== Demographics ==
Historical population
Census	Pop.	Note	%±
1990	6,404		—
2000	7,328		14.4%
2010	7,321		−0.1%
2020	7,368		0.6%
U.S. Decennial Census; 1990 2000 2010

Interlaken first appeared as a census designated place in the 1990 U.S. census.

=== Racial and ethnic composition ===
Interlaken CDP, California – Racial and ethnic composition Note: the US Census treats Hispanic/Latino as an ethnic category. This table excludes Latinos from the racial categories and assigns them to a separate category. Hispanics/Latinos may be of any race.
Race / Ethnicity (NH = Non-Hispanic)	Pop 2000	Pop 2010	Pop 2020	% 2000	% 2010	% 2020
White alone (NH)	2,179	1,613	1,378	29.74%	22.03%	18.70%
Black or African American alone (NH)	49	32	30	0.67%	0.44%	0.41%
Native American or Alaska Native alone (NH)	39	22	17	0.53%	0.30%	0.23%
Asian alone (NH)	364	256	197	4.97%	3.50%	2.67%
Native Hawaiian or Pacific Islander alone (NH)	5	1	4	0.07%	0.01%	0.05%
Other race alone (NH)	4	8	38	0.05%	0.11%	0.52%
Mixed race or Multiracial (NH)	137	128	161	1.87%	1.75%	2.19%
Hispanic or Latino (any race)	4,551	5,261	5,543	62.10%	71.86%	75.23%
Total	7,328	7,321	7,368	100.00%	100.00%	100.00%

=== 2020 census ===
As of the 2020 census, Interlaken had a population of 7,368. The population density was 751.5 inhabitants per square mile (290.2/km^{2}).

The age distribution was 25.7% under the age of 18, 9.9% aged 18 to 24, 27.0% aged 25 to 44, 23.6% aged 45 to 64, and 13.8% who were 65 years of age or older. The median age was 35.1 years. For every 100 females there were 101.3 males, and for every 100 females age 18 and over there were 100.7 males age 18 and over.

The census reported that 99.1% of the population lived in households, 63 people (0.9%) lived in non-institutionalized group quarters, and no one was institutionalized. 78.1% of residents lived in urban areas, while 21.9% lived in rural areas.

There were 1,841 households, of which 48.3% had children under the age of 18 living in them. Of all households, 58.9% were married-couple households, 7.1% were cohabiting-couple households, 13.0% were households with a male householder and no spouse or partner present, and 21.0% were households with a female householder and no spouse or partner present. About 11.4% of all households were made up of individuals and 6.0% had someone living alone who was 65 years of age or older. The average household size was 3.97. There were 1,527 families (82.9% of all households).

There were 1,876 housing units at an average density of 191.4 units per square mile (73.9 units/km^{2}), of which 1,841 (98.1%) were occupied. Of these, 66.1% were owner-occupied and 33.9% were occupied by renters. 1.9% of housing units were vacant. The homeowner vacancy rate was 0.2% and the rental vacancy rate was 1.7%.

=== 2010 census ===
At the 2010 census Interlaken had a population of 7,321. The population density was 717.6 inhabitants per square mile (277.1/km^{2}). The racial makeup of Interlaken was 3,856 (52.7%) White, 58 (0.8%) African American, 128 (1.7%) Native American, 302 (4.1%) Asian, 2 (0.0%) Pacific Islander, 2,573 (35.1%) from other races, and 402 (5.5%) from two or more races. Hispanic or Latino of any race were 5,261 persons (71.9%).

The census reported that 98.5% of the population lived in households and 1.5% lived in non-institutionalized group quarters.

There were 1,690 households, 885 (52.4%) had children under the age of 18 living in them, 1,075 (63.6%) were opposite-sex married couples living together, 227 (13.4%) had a female householder with no husband present, 123 (7.3%) had a male householder with no wife present. There were 92 (5.4%) unmarried opposite-sex partnerships, and 11 (0.7%) same-sex married couples or partnerships. 179 households (10.6%) were one person and 88 (5.2%) had someone living alone who was 65 or older. The average household size was 4.27. There were 1,425 families (84.3% of households); the average family size was 4.43.

The age distribution was 2,138 people (29.2%) under the age of 18, 853 people (11.7%) aged 18 to 24, 2,039 people (27.9%) aged 25 to 44, 1,658 people (22.6%) aged 45 to 64, and 633 people (8.6%) who were 65 or older. The median age was 30.5 years. For every 100 females, there were 109.6 males. For every 100 females age 18 and over, there were 106.7 males.

There were 1,759 housing units at an average density of 172.4 per square mile (66.6/km^{2}), of which 71.4% were owner-occupied and 28.6% were occupied by renters. The homeowner vacancy rate was 0.7%; the rental vacancy rate was 1.8%. 68.6% of the population lived in owner-occupied housing units and 29.8% lived in rental housing units.

=== Demographic estimates ===
In 2023, the US Census Bureau estimated that 31.2% of the population were foreign-born. Of all people aged 5 or older, 36.3% spoke only English at home, 62.1% spoke Spanish, 1.6% spoke other Indo-European languages, 0.0% spoke Asian or Pacific Islander languages, and 0.0% spoke other languages. Of those aged 25 or older, 73.3% were high school graduates and 18.0% had a bachelor's degree.

=== Income and poverty ===
The median household income in 2023 was $111,021, and the per capita income was $36,003. About 3.9% of families and 8.2% of the population were below the poverty line.

== Government ==
In the California State Legislature, Interlaken is in the 17th senatorial district, represented by Democrat John Laird, and in the 29th Assembly district, represented by Democrat Robert Rivas.

In the United States House of Representatives, Interlaken is in California's 18th congressional district, represented by Democrat Zoe Lofgren.
