= Freedom, California =

Freedom
- census-designated place
- Location in Santa Cruz County and the state of California

- Location in the United States
- Coordinates: 36°56′26″N 121°47′22″W
- Country: United States
- State: California
- County: Santa Cruz

Area
  - Total: 1.134 sq mi (2.936 km^{2})
  - Land: 1.134 sq mi (2.936 km^{2})
  - Water: 0 sq mi (0 km^{2}) 0%
- Elevation: 125 ft (38 m)

Population (2020)
  - Total: 3,835
  - Density: 3,383/sq mi (1,306/km^{2})
- Time zone: UTC-8 (PST)
  - Summer (DST): UTC-7 (PDT)
- ZIP code: 95019
- Area code: 831
- FIPS code: 06-25576
- GNIS feature ID: 1658576

Freedom is a census-designated place (CDP) in Santa Cruz County, California, United States. The population was 3,835 at the 2020 census.

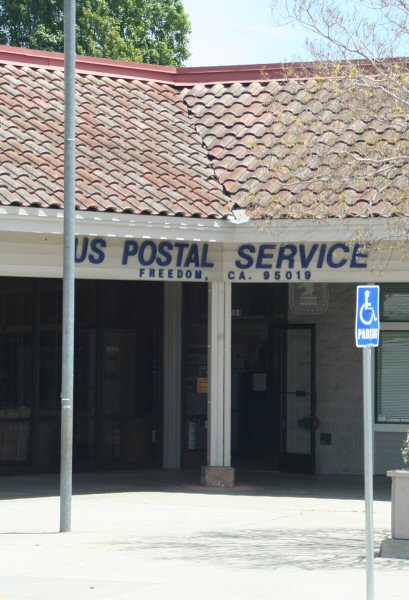
Freedom Post Office.

== Toponymy ==
Originally known as Whiskey Hill, likely as a consequence of eleven saloons located there in 1852.

In 1877, the residents voted to change the name to Freedom, most likely because many of the saloons had closed and the United States Centennial fervor of the prior year's celebration.

== Geography ==
Freedom is located at 36°56′26″N 121°47′22″W (36.940452, -121.789376). According to the United States Census Bureau, the CDP has a total area of 1.1 square miles (2.8 km^{2}), all land. It is adjacent to and blends with the incorporated city of Watsonville.

== Demographics ==
Historical population
Census	Pop.	Note	%±
1950	2,765		—
1960	4,206		52.1%
1970	5,563		32.3%
1980	6,416		15.3%
1990	8,361		30.3%
2000	6,000		−28.2%
2010	3,070		−48.8%
2020	3,835		24.9%
U.S. Decennial Census; 1860–1870 1880-1890; 1900 1910 1920; 1930 1940 1950; 1960 1970 1980; 1990 2000 2010; 2020

Freedom first appeared as an unincorporated community in the 1950 U.S. census; and as a census-designated place in the 1980 United States census.

=== Racial and ethnic composition ===
Freedom CDP, California – Racial and ethnic composition Note: the US Census treats Hispanic/Latino as an ethnic category. This table excludes Latinos from the racial categories and assigns them to a separate category. Hispanics/Latinos may be of any race.
Race / Ethnicity (NH = Non-Hispanic)	Pop 2000	Pop 2010	Pop 2020	% 2000	% 2010	% 2020
White alone (NH)	1,441	724	728	24.02%	23.58%	18.98%
Black or African American alone (NH)	28	26	16	0.47%	0.85%	0.42%
Native American or Alaska Native alone (NH)	30	15	6	0.50%	0.49%	0.16%
Asian alone (NH)	195	91	69	3.25%	2.96%	1.80%
Native Hawaiian or Pacific Islander alone (NH)	5	0	0	0.08%	0.00%	0.00%
Other race alone (NH)	7	0	9	0.12%	0.00%	0.23%
Mixed race or Multiracial (NH)	129	44	87	2.15%	1.43%	2.27%
Hispanic or Latino (any race)	4,165	2,170	2,920	69.42%	70.68%	76.14%
Total	6,000	3,070	3,835	100.00%	100.00%	100.00%

=== 2020 census ===
As of the 2020 census, Freedom had a population of 3,835. The population density was 3,381.8 inhabitants per square mile (1,305.7/km^{2}). The racial makeup of Freedom was 30.4% White, 0.5% African American, 2.1% Native American, 2.0% Asian, 0.0% Pacific Islander, 47.3% from other races, and 17.7% from two or more races. Hispanic or Latino of any race were 76.1% of the population.

The census reported that 99.9% of the population lived in households and four residents (0.1%) were institutionalized. In addition, 98.9% of residents lived in urban areas, while 1.1% lived in rural areas.

There were 1,007 households, out of which 50.4% included children under the age of 18, 53.3% were married-couple households, 9.7% were cohabiting couple households, 23.4% had a female householder with no partner present, and 13.5% had a male householder with no partner present. 13.7% of households were one person, and 6.9% were one person aged 65 or older. The average household size was 3.8. There were 810 families (80.4% of all households).

The age distribution was 28.2% under the age of 18, 10.1% aged 18 to 24, 27.6% aged 25 to 44, 22.3% aged 45 to 64, and 11.7% who were 65 years of age or older. The median age was 33.5 years. For every 100 females, there were 95.5 males, and for every 100 females age 18 and over, there were 95.3 males.

There were 1,022 housing units at an average density of 901.2 units per square mile (348.0 units/km^{2}), of which 1,007 (98.5%) were occupied and 1.5% were vacant. Of occupied units, 56.8% were owner-occupied, and 43.2% were occupied by renters. The homeowner vacancy rate was 0.3%, and the rental vacancy rate was 0.9%.

=== Income and poverty ===
In 2023, the US Census Bureau estimated that the median household income was $139,722, and the per capita income was $39,276. About 4.1% of families and 7.0% of the population were below the poverty line.

=== 2010 census ===
The 2010 United States census reported that Freedom had a population of 3,070. The population density was 2,780.8 inhabitants per square mile (1,073.7/km^{2}). The racial makeup of Freedom was 1,452 (47.3%) White, 44 (1.4%) African American, 31 (1.0%) Native American, 100 (3.3%) Asian, 1,285 (41.9%) from other races, and 158 (5.1%) from two or more races. Hispanic or Latino of any race were 2,170 persons (70.7%).

The Census reported that 99.8% of the population lived in households and 0.2% were institutionalized.

There were 776 households, out of which 394 (50.8%) had children under the age of 18 living in them, 445 (57.3%) were opposite-sex married couples living together, 124 (16.0%) had a female householder with no husband present, 73 (9.4%) had a male householder with no wife present. There were 63 (8.1%) unmarried opposite-sex partnerships, and 11 (1.4%) same-sex married couples or partnerships. 102 households (13.1%) were made up of individuals, and 44 (5.7%) had someone living alone who was 65 years of age or older. The average household size was 3.95. There were 642 families (82.7% of all households); the average family size was 4.12.

The population was spread out, with 904 people (29.4%) under the age of 18, 347 people (11.3%) aged 18 to 24, 891 people (29.0%) aged 25 to 44, 655 people (21.3%) aged 45 to 64, and 273 people (8.9%) who were 65 years of age or older. The median age was 30.2 years. For every 100 females, there were 103.0 males. For every 100 females age 18 and over, there were 101.7 males.

There were 806 housing units at an average density of 730.1 per square mile (281.9/km^{2}), of which 65.6% were owner-occupied and 34.4% were occupied by renters. The homeowner vacancy rate was 1.4%; the rental vacancy rate was 2.2%. 60.9% of the population lived in owner-occupied housing units and 38.9% lived in rental housing units.

== Government ==
In the California State Legislature, Freedom is in the 17th senatorial district, represented by Democrat John Laird, and in the 29th Assembly district, represented by Democrat Robert Rivas.

In the United States House of Representatives, Freedom is in California's 18th congressional district, represented by Democrat Zoe Lofgren.

== See also ==
- List of census-designated places in California
- KPIG-FM
