= Frenchtown, Yuba County, California =

Unincorporated community in California, United States

Frenchtown
- Unincorporated community
- Location in California Frenchtown (the United States)
- Coordinates: 39°23′17″N 121°15′18″W
- Country: United States
- State: California
- County: Yuba
- Elevation: 1,447 ft (441 m)

Frenchtown is an unincorporated community in Yuba County, California, United States. It is located on Dry Creek, 6 miles (9.7 km) southeast of Rackerby, at an elevation of 1447 feet (441 m).

The town was started by a Frenchman named Vavasseur. He built a hotel and store in 1854 at the site of Frenchtown, which soon numbered some 500 residents and had three hotels, three saloons, two blacksmith shops, a barber shop, and a bakery. However, the town was "virtually abandoned" by 1870, and by 1928 the only remains were an adobe wine cellar, a stone bridge, and an ore-processing apparatus. In 1940, San Francisco attorney Thomas F. Califro bought the Frenchtown site and built a country estate there, using one of the stone rollers of the ore-processing arrastra in his front wall. Today the Frenchtown area is a vacation destination, with wineries of the North Yuba AVA and country inns.
