= Frenchtown, El Dorado County, California =

Unincorporated community in California, United States

Frenchtown
- Unincorporated community
- Location in California Frenchtown (the United States)
- Coordinates: 38°38′29″N 120°54′41″W
- Country: United States
- State: California
- County: El Dorado
- Elevation: 1,165 ft (355 m)

Frenchtown (formerly French Creek) is an unincorporated community in El Dorado County, California, United States. It is located on French Creek 2 miles (3.2 km) south-southeast of Shingle Springs, at an elevation of 1165 feet (355 m).

The place was originally a mining camp set up by French Canadian and French miners.
