= James Pattee Sargent =

California politician

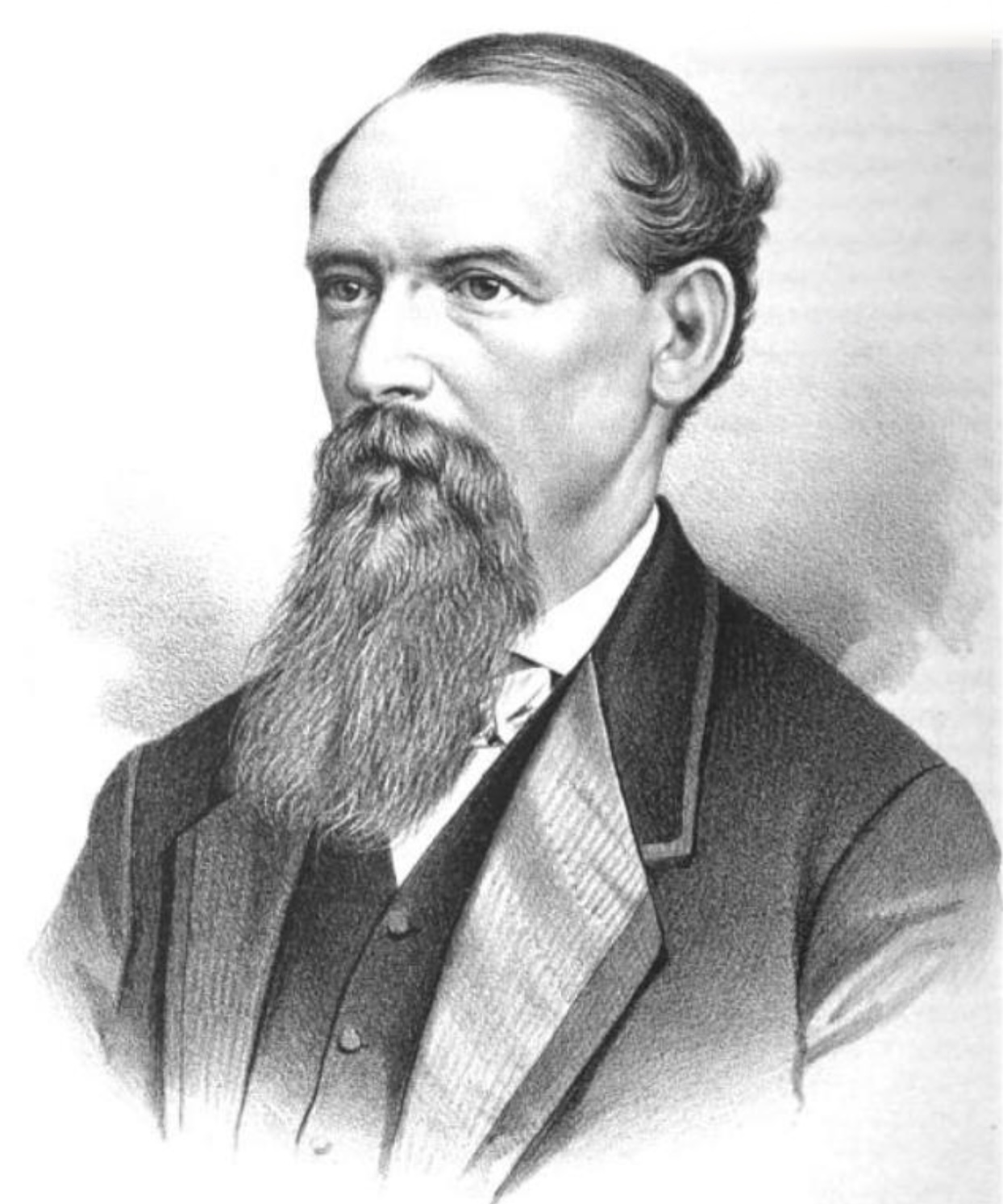
- Sargent in 1888

Member of the California State Assembly from the 7th district
- In office September 6, 1871 – 1873

Personal details
- Born: February 11, 1823; Thornton, New Hampshire, US
- Died: March 22, 1900 (aged 77); Gilroy, California, US
- Resting place: San Carlos Cemetery
- Political party: Republican
- Spouse: Agnes Bowie
- Children: 5

James Pattee Sargent (February 11, 1823 – March 22, 1900), also known as J. P. Sargent, was an American politician who was a member of the California State Assembly, representing Santa Clara County, California from 1871 to 1873. He owned Rancho Juristac in Santa Clara County and was one of the wealthiest landowners in the county. Sargent Station, situated between Watsonville and Gilroy on the Southern Pacific Railroad, was named after him.

== Early life and education ==
Sargent was born on March 28, 1821, in Thornton, New Hampshire. He was one of six children of Jacob P. Sargent and Martha H. Webster. After the death of his mother in 1838, he moved to Merrimack County, New Hampshire.

== Career ==
In 1843, Sargent relocated to Massachusetts, where he spent the winters driving a milk cart for his uncle near Quincy. In 1844, he partnered with his brother, Roswell C. in the ice business, which they operated for several years in Boston. In 1848, they traveled to Chicago where he became the first to cut ice using machinery in the city. He remained in this business until the spring of 1849, when he sold it to travel with his brothers to California during the gold rush. They crossed the Great Plains, while another brother, Bradley V., came around the Cape Horn. In 1850, they arrived in Weaverville, California, in the San Joaquin Valley, and did business under the name of "Sargent Brothers". They engaged in merchandising, stock-raising, and mining. In 1853, Sargent moved to Santa Clara County, California, and settled on the Los Angeles Ranch where he continued livestock raising. In 1854, he relocated to a tract near Soap Lake.

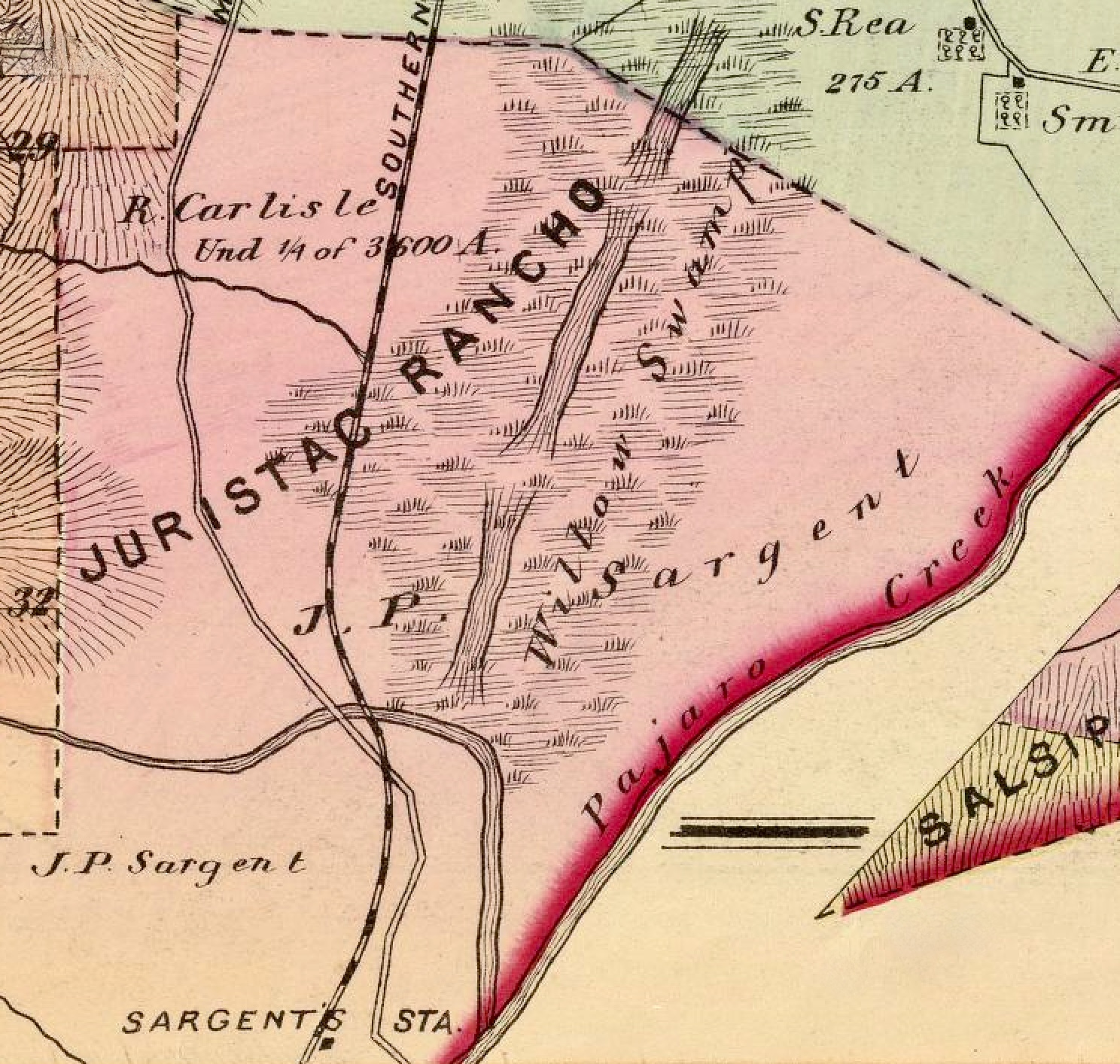
Juristac Rancho Map showing J. P. Sargent ranch and Sargent's station located five miles south of Gilroy, California

In 1856, Sargent purchased Rancho Juristac, a 4,540 acres (1,840 ha) property located five miles south of Gilroy, California. He established his residence there, and it became known as Sargent Ranch. In 1869, the Southern Pacific Railroad added a stop called Sargent Station. On November 13, 1871, Sargent obtained a patent for Rancho Juristac, officially naming it Sargent Ranch, with its own railroad stop. It was one of the largest cattle ranches in the region. By 1895, the area was a popular gathering place for hunters and social groups. The Sargent Brothers acquired and developed sizable holdings in San Joaquin, Santa Clara, and Monterey counties.

Sargent married Agnes Bowie San Juan, Monterey County, on October 31, 1864. She was originally from Montreal, Canada. They had five children together.

== Political career ==
Sargent was involved in Republican Party politics, serving a term as a member of the California State Assembly. In 1871, he was elected assemblyman of Santa Clara County from 1871 to 1873. He worked alongside Frederick C. Franck and Francis E. Spencer.

Sargent was a member of the Society of California Pioneers and the Knights Templar. He served as a director of the Santa Clara Valley Agricultural Society for ten years and was elected its president for one term in 1877.

== Death and legacy ==
Sargent died at his home near Sargent's Station in Gilroy on March 22, 1900. His obituary in the San Francisco Call and Post described him as one of the wealthiest men in Monterey County at the time of his death. The area, including Sargent Station, Sargent Hills and Sargent Creek, still bears his name.

== See also ==
- List of ranchos of California
