= Sargent, California =

City in California, United States

City of Sargent
- Ghost town
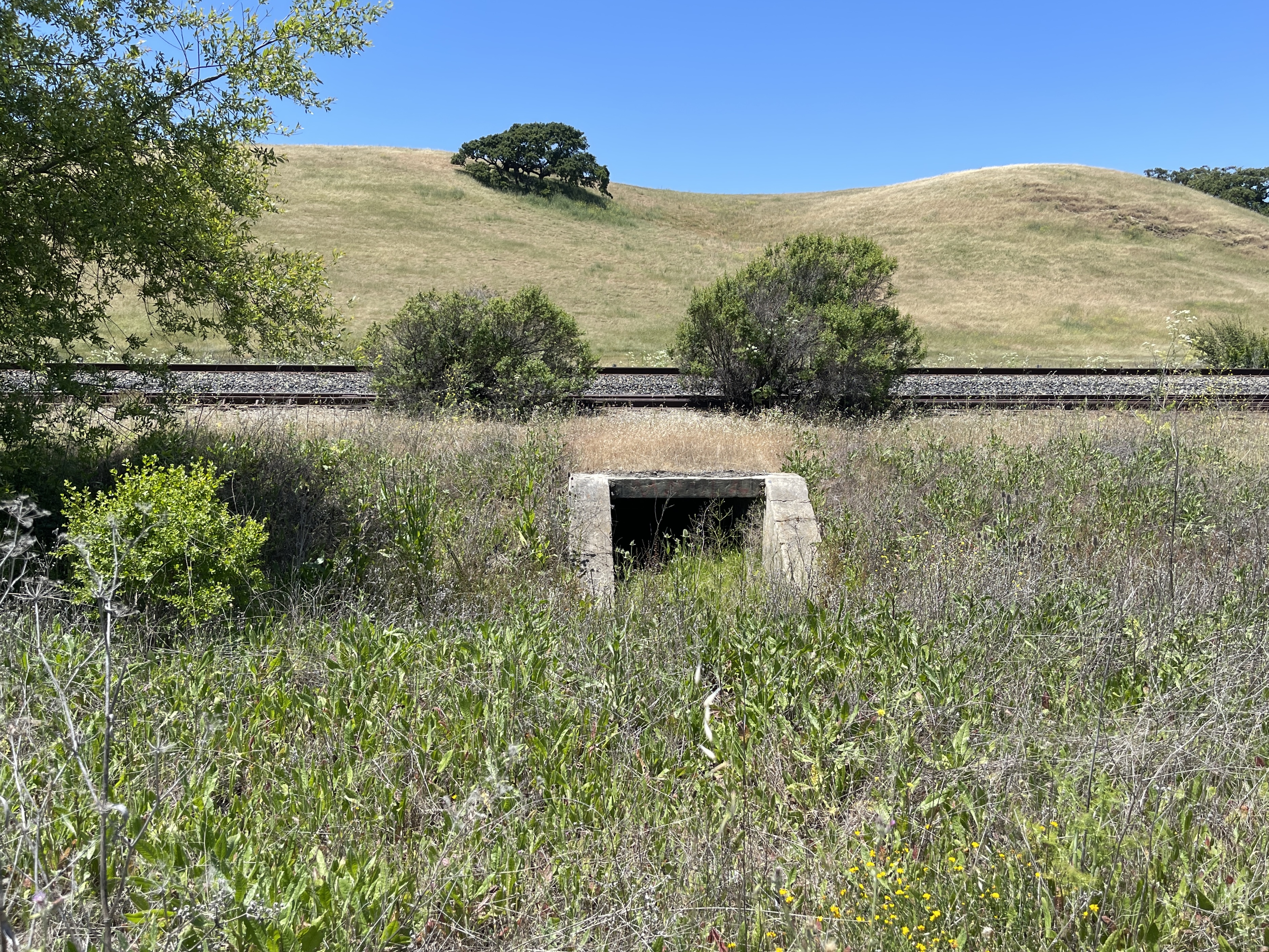
- Sargent, California

- Location within Northern California##Location within the state of California
- Coordinates: 36°55′10″N 121°32′53″W
- Country: United States
- State: California
- County: Santa Clara
- Established: 1864
- Elevation: 144 ft (44 m)
- Time zone: UTC−8 (Pacific (PST))
  - Summer (DST): UTC−7 (PDT)
- GNIS feature ID: 1656278

Sargent is a ghost town in central California, located on the border of San Benito County, California, United States. Most of the town lies on the north side of the county line in Santa Clara County, approximately 5 miles (8 km) south of Gilroy, along the Southern Pacific Railroad track, just west of U.S. 101. The town is located at an elevation of 144 feet (44 m) above sea level. Founded in 1864 as a farming town, Sargent emerged during the booming railroad era, which enabled towns to develop along the tracks.

== History ==
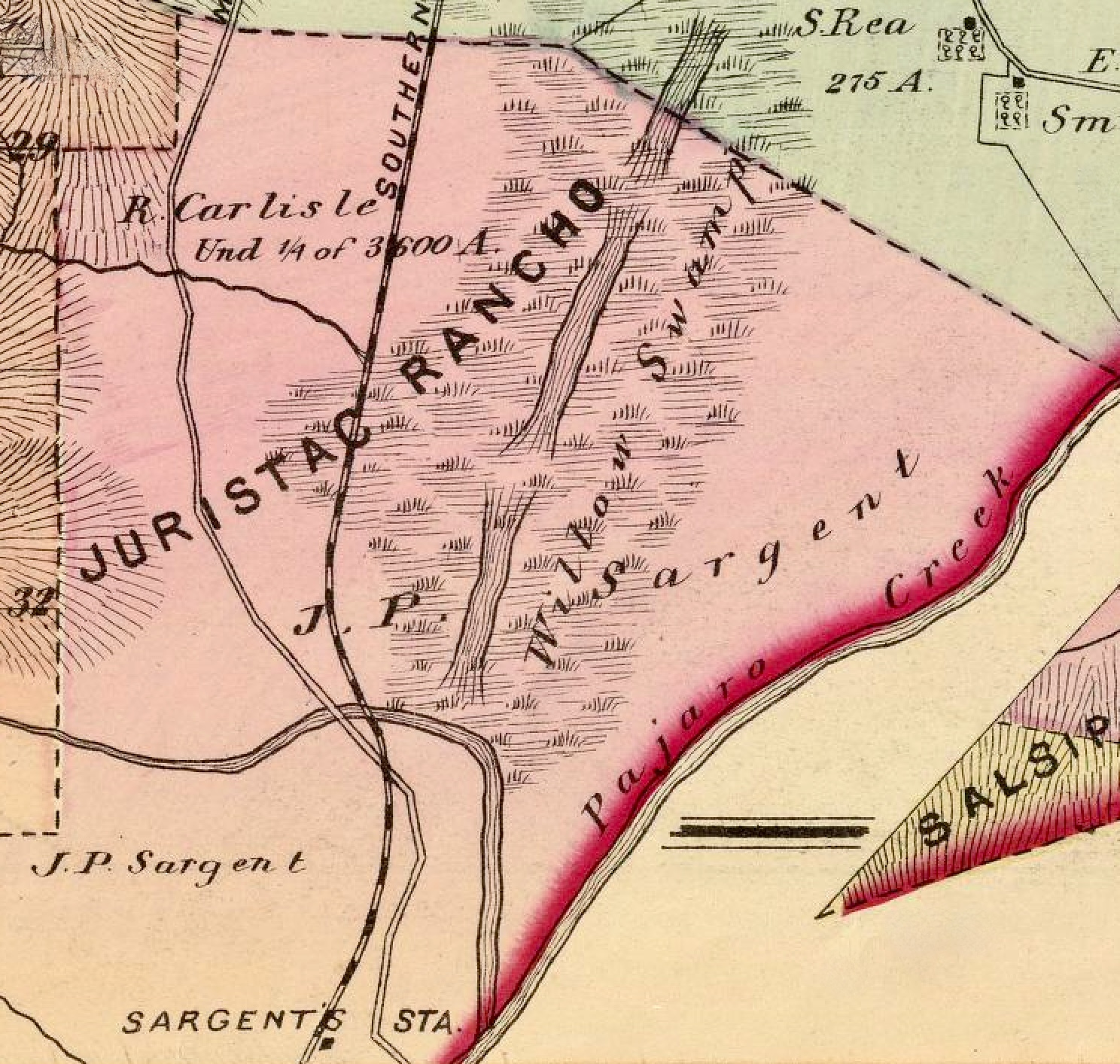
Rancho Juristac Map showing J. P. Sargent ranch, Pajaro Creek, and Sargent station

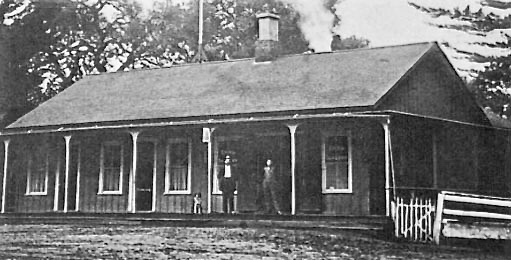
Sargent Station in Sargent, California

Before the Spanish colonizers arrived to settle Alta California in 1769, approximately 2,700 Mutsun Native Americans speakers inhabited villages along the Pajaro River. Today, most of the over 500 members of the Amah Mutsun band are descendants of the native people who were baptized at Mission San Juan Bautista. Spanish explorers led by Juan Bautista de Anza and Pedro Font first passed through the Santa Clara Valley area in 1776, and in 1797 Mission San Juan Bautista was established near the Pajaro River. In 1835, Antonio and Faustino German were granted, by Governor José Castro, the 4,540-acre (18.4 km^{2}) Mexican land grant Rancho Juristac. In 1856 James Pattee Sargent (1823–1890), a rancher and assemblyman, bought Rancho Juristac with his brothers, where he established his residence, later known as Sargent Ranch. The establishment of the Sargent Station in 1869 marked the beginning of the town's prominence. Located off Monterey Road next to Sargent Ranch, the station quickly became a stop on the Southern Pacific Railroad, facilitating the transport of goods and passengers and spurring economic growth in the surrounding area. Additionally, Sargent Hills and Sargent Creek are also located nearby to the west. Sargent was frequently mentioned as the western boundary of the Soap Lake floodplain.

By 1872, southern destinations could be reached daily by taking the passenger train to Gilroy, continuing to Sargent's Station, and then proceeding by stagecoach. Mark Regan established a stage line that transported passengers from Sargent Station to San Juan and Hollister.

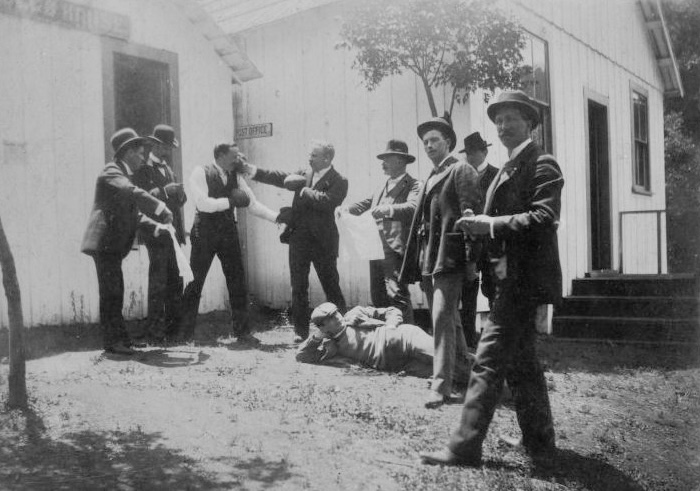
Group at Post Office at Sargent Station

Sargent developed into a community with cottages, a hotel, post office, saloon, an open-air dance floor, and a clubhouse near the station. The town's proximity to the railroad made it an ideal location for farmers to ship their produce. As a strategic stop on the line, Sargent Station became a hub for both freight and passenger services. Farmers in the region relied on the station to transport their crops, such as wheat, barley, and fruits, to processing plants and larger markets. In 1895, shipments from Sargent station consisted of hay, grain, fruit, cheese, butter, and eggs.

In the late 1800s, Sargent became known as a popular resort and gathering for summer picnics along the Pajaro River. Its overhanging willows provided a cool, secluded area ideal for hunting, boating and fishing. Sargent was situated at the only bridge crossing of the Pajaro River for many miles. By 1895, it was a favored spot for hunters and social groups from nearby cities like San Francisco and San Jose.

== Sargent oil field ==
Sargent played an important role in oil transportation along Monterey Road to San Jose. About 5.25 miles from Sargent lies an active oil field known as the Sargent Oil Field, situated on Tar Creek just north of the Santa Cruz County line. Around 1899, the Watsonville Oil Company initiated oil extraction from the Sargent Ranch oil field. Tar, sourced from the tap springs along Monterey Road, was transported from Sargent Station to San José for use in street paving. By 1864, an oil and kerosene distillery was in operation at Sargent. When the company ceased its activities in 1948, it had shipped 780,000 barrels of oil from the Sargent station. This was the highest amount of oil produced by any oil field in the San Francisco Bay Area.

Although most of the Sargent oil fields were situated about three miles west of Sargent, several wells were located just a quarter-mile west of the Sargent station.

== Decline and legacy ==
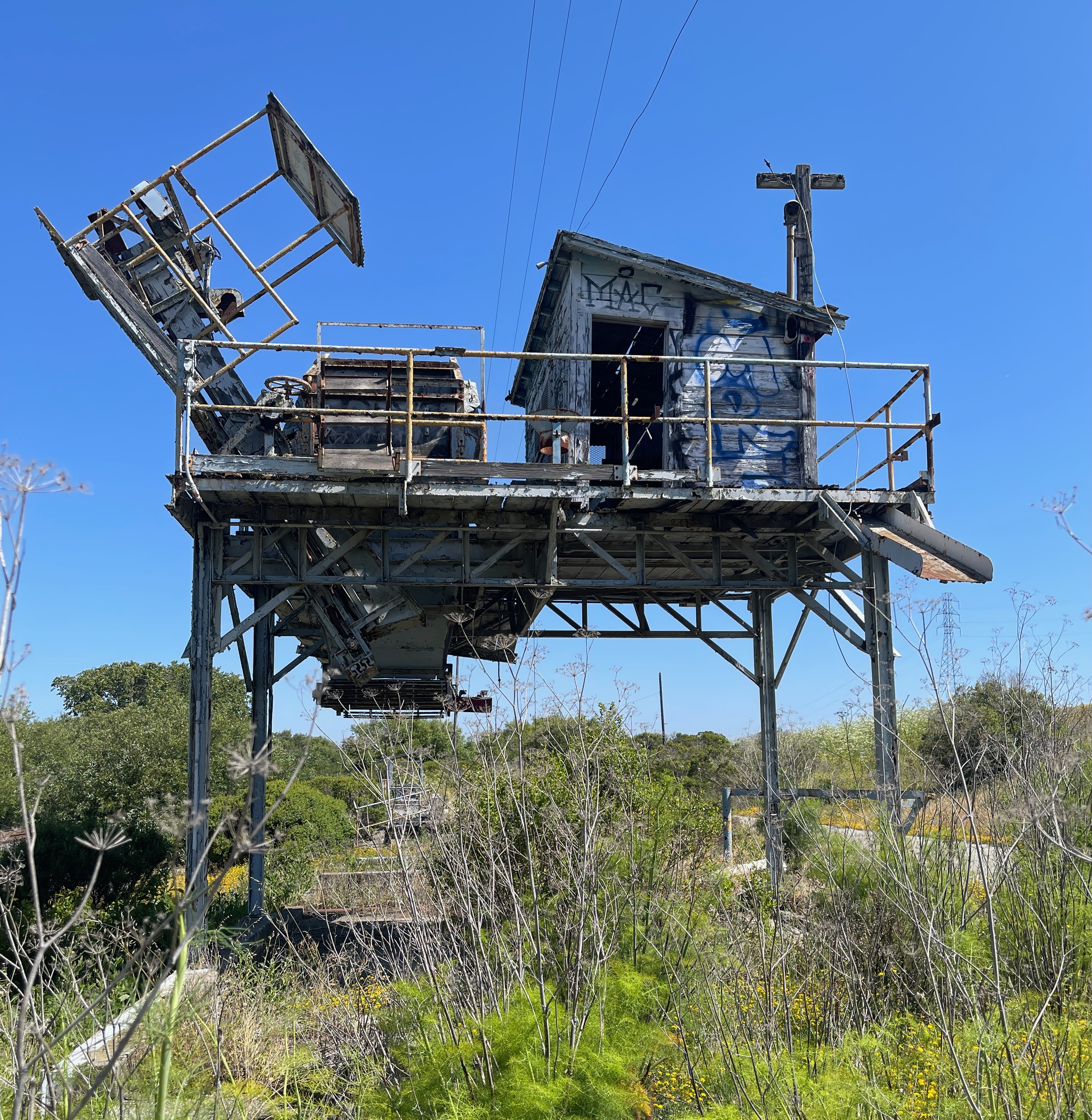
The beet-loading tower sitting beside the abandoned spur at Sargent

When the bridge across the Pajaro River was rebuilt and realigned in 1941, Sargent's Station became inaccessible, and many of its buildings were abandoned.

== See also ==
- List of ghost towns in California
- Lost cities
- Old field (ecology)
