= Sargent station =

Rail station in California, US, 1869–1971

Sargent
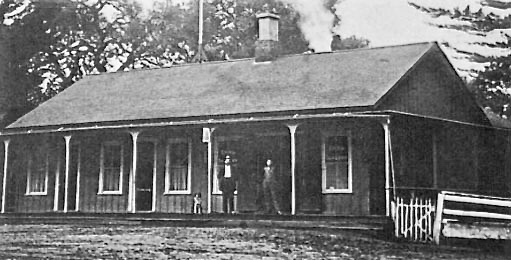
- Sargent Station

General information
- Location: Monterey Road; Santa Clara County, California, U.S.
- Coordinates: 36°55′10″N 121°32′53″W
- Line: Coast Line
- Platforms: 1 side platform
- Tracks: 1

History
- Opened: 1869

Services
Preceding station	Southern Pacific Railroad	Following station
Gilroy toward San Francisco	Coast Line	Aromas toward Los Angeles
Location

Sargent station was a railroad depot for Sargent, California. The station stop was established in 1869 when the Santa Clara and Pajaro Valley Railroad extended its line to Sargent. Located near the mouth of Pescadero Creek and adjacent to the Sargent Ranch, the station was named after James Pattee Sargent, who owned the Rancho Juristac Mexican land grant and served in the California State Assembly representing Santa Clara County.

== History ==
Prior to 1769, the site was inhabited by approximately 2,700 Amah Mutsun Ohlone Indigenous peoples who lived in villages along the Pajaro River before the arrival of Spanish colonizers who settled in Alta California. Today most of the over 500 members of the Amah Mutsun band are descendants of the native people who were later baptized at Mission San Juan Bautista. Spanish explorers led by the military officer Juan Bautista de Anza and Pedro Font (missionary) first passed through the Santa Clara Valley area in 1776. Later, in 1797 Mission San Juan Bautista was established near the Pajaro River. In 1835, Antonio and Faustino German were granted, by Governor José Castro, the 4,540-acre (18.4 km^{2}) Mexican land grant Rancho Juristac.

In 1856 James Pattee Sargent (1823–1890), a rancher and assemblyman, bought Rancho Juristac with his brothers, where he established his residence, later known as Sargent Ranch."

=== Passenger service ===
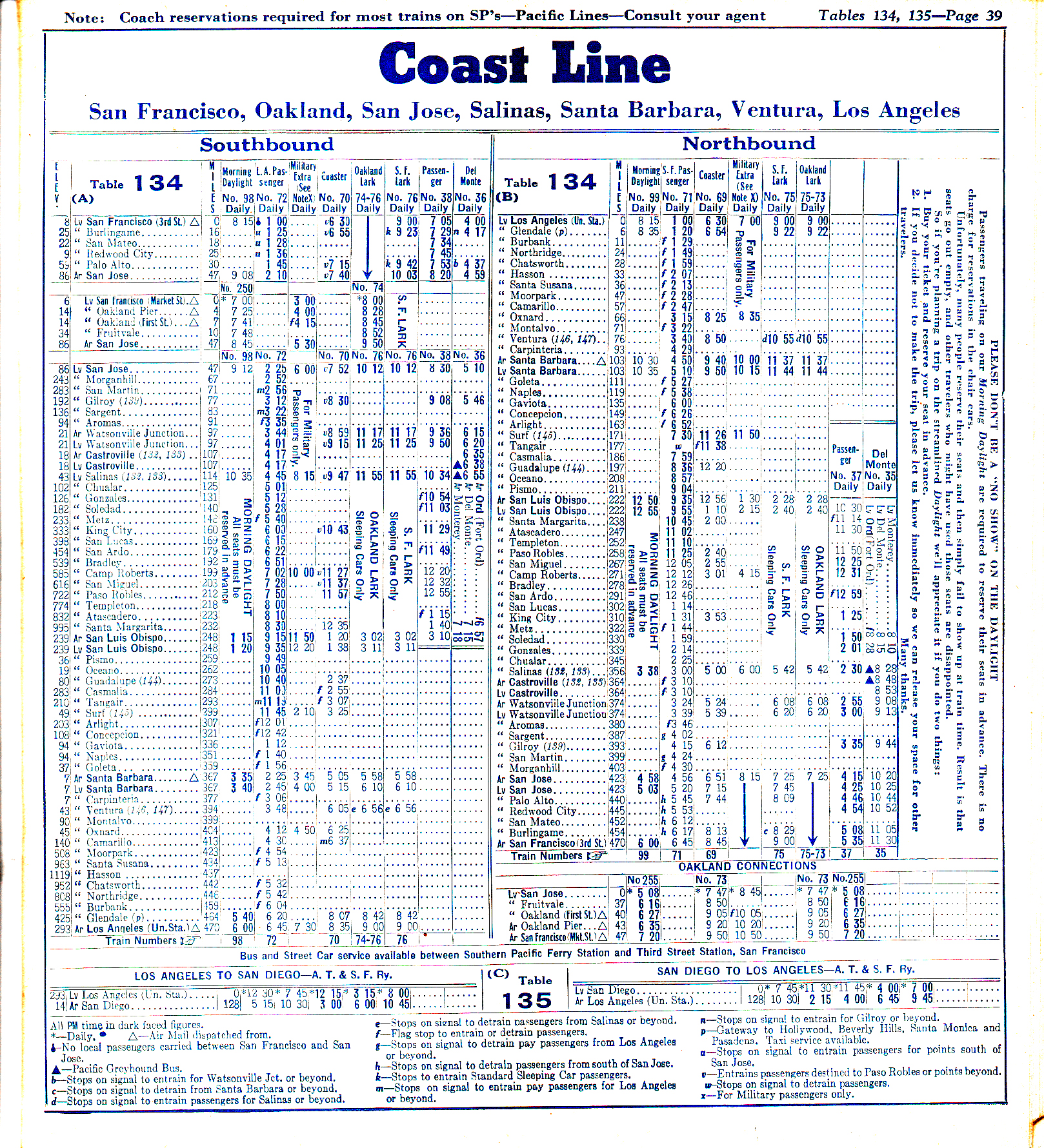
Southern Pacific RR Coast Line Time Tables for December 1945.

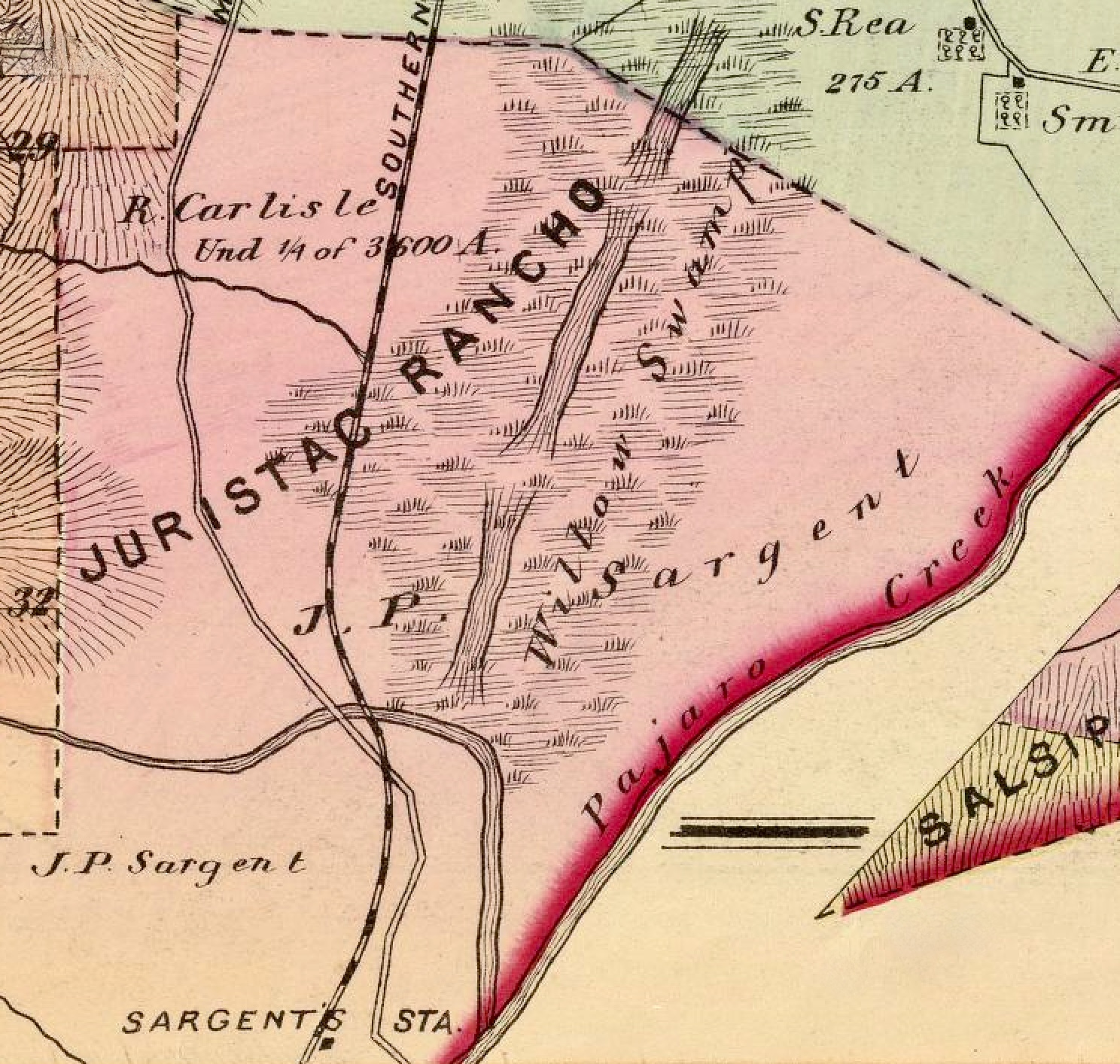
Sargent station can be seen along Southern Pacific Railroad and Monterey Road on the 1876 Thompson & West Map of Santa Clara County.

The Sargent station opened in 1869 under the Santa Clara and Pajaro Valley Railroad making Sargent Station a railway stop near Sargent Ranch, owned by rancher and former assemblyman James Pattee Sargent. A year later, the line was acquired by Southern Pacific Railroad.

By 1872, southern destinations could be reached daily by taking the Southern Pacific railroad to Gilroy, continuing to Sargent's Station, and then proceeding by stagecoach. By 1890, the Monterey Express stopped at Sargent Station to allow passengers to continue by stage to San Juan and Hollister.

There were several train crashes at Sargent Station. For instance, on November 12, 1906, the engine boiler of the Sunset Limited train No. 10 exploded at Sargent's Station, setting the station building on fire. In 1897, Del Monte Express struck a bowlder, causing damage and derailing one of its cars. By 1945, Southern Pacific Railroad Coast Line timetables indicated that stops at Sargent station were made on signal for passengers traveling to Los Angeles and other destinations.

=== Freight stop ===
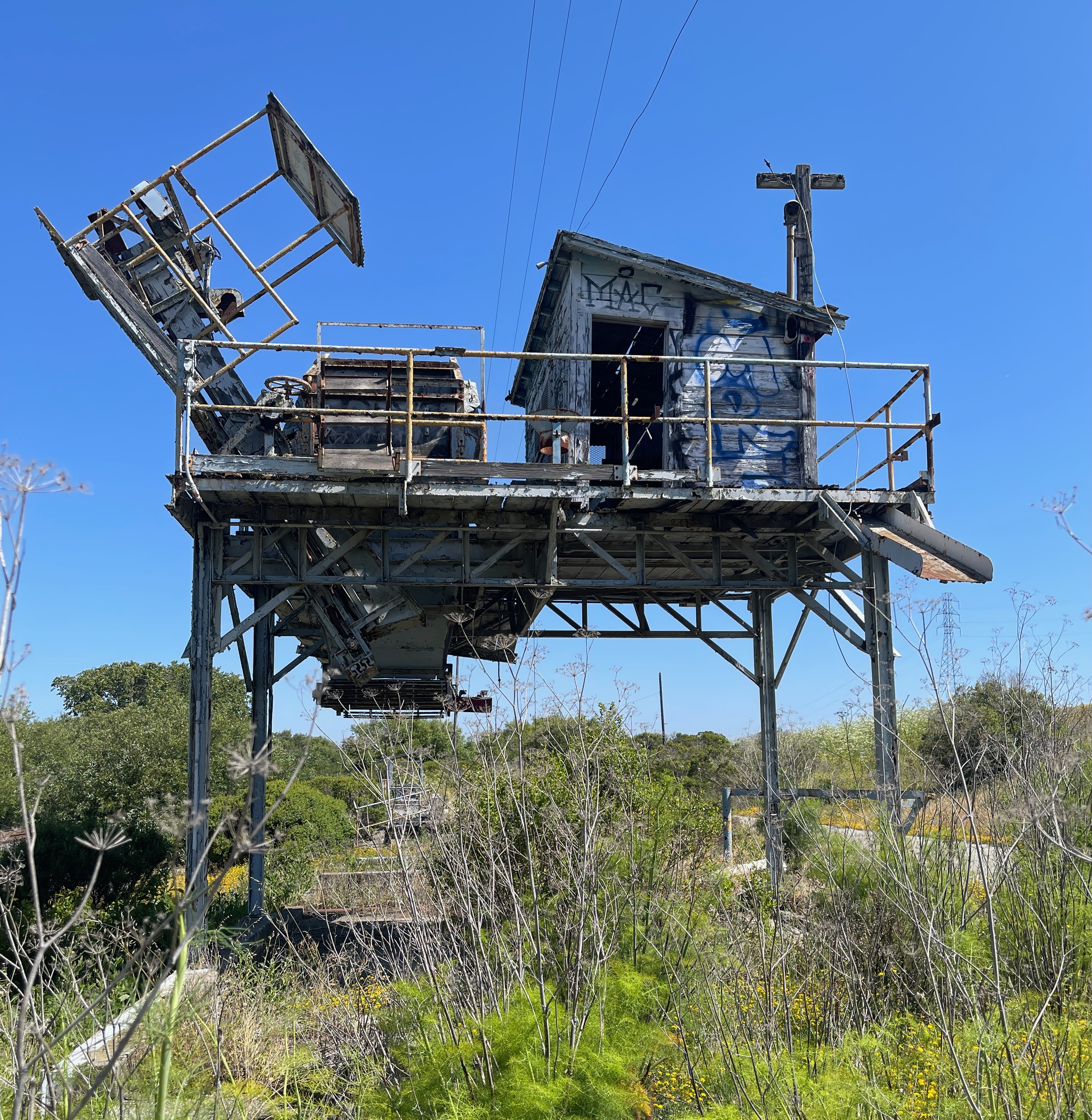
The beet-loading tower sitting beside the abandoned spur at Sargent station in 2024.

Sargent Station was a key site for shipping oil along Monterey Road to San Jose. Around the turn of the century, the Watsonville Oil Company began extracting oil from the Sargent Ranch oil field. By 1864, an oil and kerosene distillery was operating at Sargent Station. When the company ceased operations in 1948, it had shipped 780,000 barrels of oil from the station.

In 1949, the Union Sugar Company established a beet loading station in Sargent. To accommodate this, Southern Pacific constructed a new spur track to serve the loading station. Beets were transferred from trucks into the train cars. The sugar beet loader has been abandoned but can be seen along Highway 101 near the town of Sargent.
