= Roswell Chapman Sargent =

American politician (1821–1903)

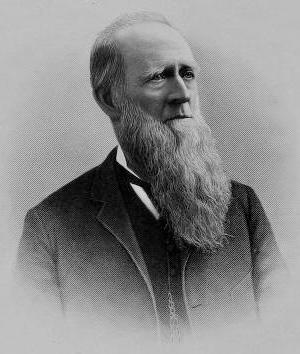
- R. C. Sargent

Member of the California State Assembly from the 7th district
- In office September 6, 1871 – 1873 Serving with Frederick C. Franck, Francis E. Spencer

Member of the U.S. House of Representatives from 's 16th district
- In office September 7, 1875 – 1877 Serving with Henry A. Carter, Thomas Dunlap, Martin Lammers, John Patterson

Member of the U.S. House of Representatives from 's 16th district
- In office September 4, 1877 – 1880 Serving with Thomas Dunlap, Robert Ludgate, Samuel Meyers, Rees B. Thompson

Member of the U.S. House of Representatives from 's 16th district
- In office November 2, 1880 – 1882 Serving with John Patterson, Charles C. Paulk, Charles B. Swift, Chapman Warkins

Personal details
- Born: March 28, 1821; Thornton, New Hampshire, US
- Died: June 15, 1903 (aged 82); Stockton, California, US
- Resting place: Casa Bonita Funeral Home, Stockton, California
- Political party: Republican
- Spouse: Catherine Isabelle Smith
- Children: 7

Roswell Chapman Sargent (March 28, 1821 – June 15, 1903), also known as R. C. Sargent, was an American politician who was a member of the California State Assembly, representing San Joaquin County, California from 1871 to 1882. He owned large ranch holdings in San Joaquin County and was considered the wealthiest landowner in the county at the time of his death.

== Early life and education ==
Sargent was born on March 28, 1821, in Thornton, New Hampshire. He was one of six children of Dr. Jacob P. Sargent and Martha H. Webster. He spent his early years at home and received his education in New Hampshire. After the death of his mother in 1838, he moved to Boston, Massachusetts.

== Career ==
In 1838, Sargent moved to Boston, where he worked on a farm for two years. Afterward, he spent three years in the dairy business. His next partnered with his brother, James P., in the ice business, which they ran for several years. In the fall of 1847, after selling their ice business, the brothers traveled as far west as Chicago. There, he entered the ice business and became the first to cut ice using machinery in the city. He remained in this business until the spring of 1849, when he sold it to travel by oxen with his brothers Jacob and James, to California during the gold rush. They crossed the Great Plains, while another brother, Bradley V., came around the Cape Horn. In the fall of 1850, they landed in Woodbridge, California in San Joaquin County, California, fourteen miles north of Stockton. There, they engaged in cattle raising and farming on 16,000 acres (6,500 ha) in San Joaquin County. They built the county's first brush fence around their property, and planted 160 acres (65 ha) of barley. In 1862, they were the first to use a dredger in California to reclaim land in the Sycamore slough.

The Sargent Brothers acquired and developed sizable holdings in San Joaquin, Santa Clara, and Monterey counties. Roswell and Jacob managed the San Joaquin Valley, as well as additional properties around Stockton and Lodi, California.

Sargent married Isabel Smith in 1858. She was originally from England but had been a resident of California since her youth. They had seven children together.

== Political career ==
Sargent was actively involved in Republican Party politics, serving four terms as a member of the California State Assembly from 1871 to 1882. He was an active member of committees focused on swamp lands and land reclamation. In 1871, Sargent was elected assemblymen of San Joaquin. He won the State Assembly seat for San Joaquin again in 1875, and subsequently won re-election in 1877, and 1880, serving as assemblyman for San Joaquin County for a total of four terms.

== Civic and fraternal organizations ==
Sargent was a member of several civic and fraternal organizations, including the Jefferson Lodge, I.O.O.F., of Woodbridge, the Benevolent and Protective Order of Elks, and was also a member of the Woodbridge Grange, and the Agricultural Fair Association.

== Death and legacy ==
Sargent died of a heart attack at his Stockton residence on June 15, 1903, at the age of 82. At the time of his death, he was considered the wealthiest man in San Joaquin County, owning extensive ranches in the northern part of the state and having thousands of head of cattle.

== See also ==
- List of ranchos of California
- Bradley, California
