= Pescadero =

Pescadero is the Spanish word for 'fishmonger'.

Pescadero may also refer to:

== Places ==
- Pescadero, California, USA, a town in San Mateo County, California
  - Pescadero State Beach
- El Pescadero, Baja California Sur, Mexico, a coastal town north of Cabo San Lucas
- Punta Pescadero, Baja California Sur, Mexico, a point of land served by the Punta Pescadero Airstrip
- "Pescadero" (see History of Mozilla Firefox), codename for version 0.1 of Mozilla Firefox

== Streams ==
- Pescadero Creek, a stream in San Mateo County, California
- Pescadero Creek (Pajaro River), a stream in Santa Clara and Santa Cruz Counties, tributary to the Pajaro River in California
