= Bradley V. Sargent Jr. =

American politician

Bradley Varnum Sargent Jr.
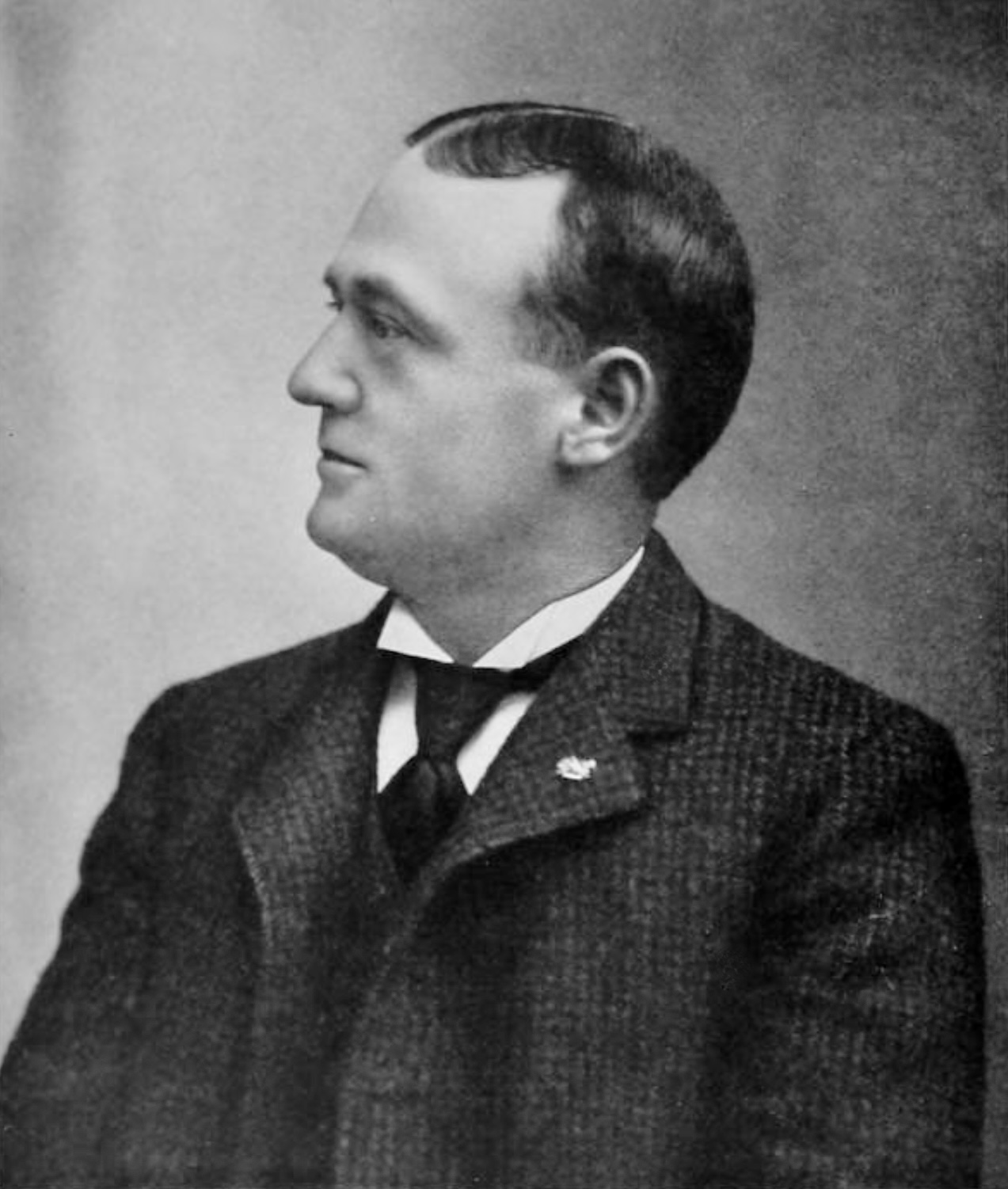
- Sargent ca. 1903

District Attorney of Monterey County
- In office 1890–1892
- Appointed by: Monterey County Board of Supervisors
- Preceded by: James A. Wall

Judge of the Monterey County Superior Court
- In office 1902–1914
- Appointed by: Democratic Party

Personal details
- Born: July 5, 1863 Monterey, California, U.S.
- Died: January 8, 1940 (aged 76) Monterey, California, U.S.
- Resting place: San Carlos Cemetery
- Party: Democratic
- Spouse: Rose C. Littlefield
- Children: 3
- Education: Santa Clara College, Yale College
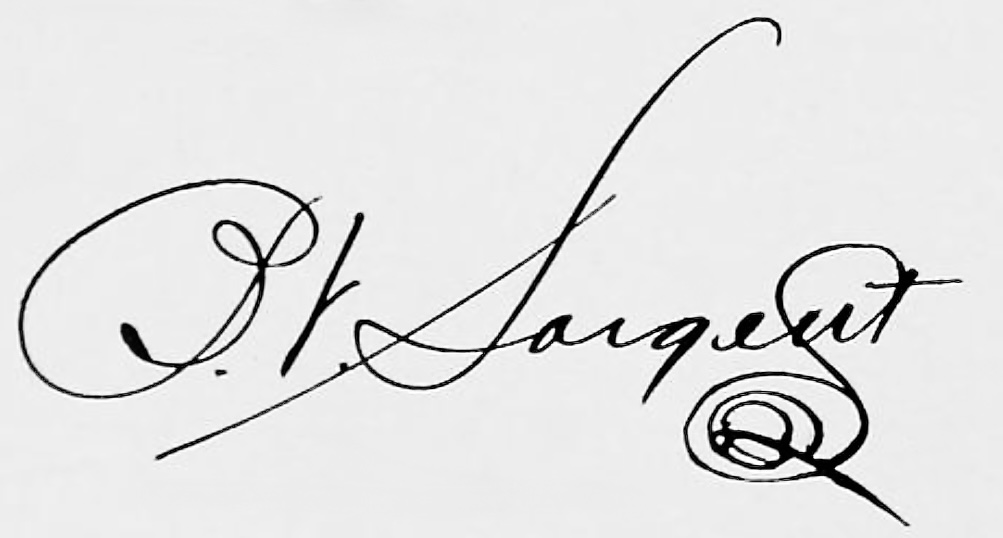
- Signature

Bradley V. Sargent Jr. (July 5, 1863 – January 8, 1940) was an American lawyer and politician who was the district attorney of Monterey County and a judge of the Monterey County Superior Court. In 1906 he established the juvenile court as a branch of the Superior Court for Monterey County.

== Early life and education ==
Sargent was born on July 5, 1863, on the Rancho Potrero de San Carlos in Carmel Valley, California. He spent his formative years on the ranch, comprising 24,000 acres (9,700 ha) owned by his father, Senator Bradley Varnum Sargent. His mother, Julia Flynn, was from Boston. Sargent received his early education in the public schools of Monterey County and in 1891 attended Santa Clara College, graduating in 1884 with a Bachelor of Science (B.S.) degree, and subsequently earning a Master of Science (M.S.) degree. In 1885, he went east and enrolled in the law department at Yale College in New Haven, Connecticut, where he graduated in 1887 with a Bachelor of Laws (LL.B.) degree.

On December 15, 1891, Sargent married Rose Littlefield, the adopted daughter of Hiram Corey, in Salinas. The couple had three children. Sargent served as the grand vice chancellor of the Knights of Pythias and is also affiliated with the Benevolent and Protective Order of Elks, Native Sons of the Golden West, Fraternal Brotherhood, and other organizations.

== Political career ==
Upon returning to California, Sargent joined the office of E. B. Stonehill, the district attorney of San Francisco and took part in the presidential election of 1888. The following year, the Monterey County Board of Supervisors appointed him assistant district attorney of Monterey County, under James A. Wall. In 1890, he was elected district attorney of Monterey County, serving one term. Afterwards, he continued to practice law in Salinas.

In 1896, while Sargent was district attorney, he built a Colonial Revival architecture-style house, now known as the B. V. Sargent House in Salinas and was listed on National Register of Historic Places on October 20, 1980.

On September 6, 1902, the Democratic Party convention nominated Sargent for judge of the superior court. He was elected by a majority of 147 votes, defeating Judge Dorn, a popular official with twelve years of service. Sargent established the juvenile court as a branch of the Monterey County Superior Court in 1906. He played a key role in shaping the law governing juvenile cases, which mandated the appointment of a probation officer under the direct supervision of superior court judges. Some of his decisions are considered landmarks in legal circles. For instance, in a notable San Francisco case, he upheld the constitutionality of an ordinance that required all laundries to close between six o'clock in the evening and seven o'clock in the morning. This ordinance aimed to prevent competition between women laundry workers and Asian immigrants. In 1918, Sargent ran for Superior Judge in San Francisco but lost the election.

After serving as a judge, he practiced law in San Francisco until 1930. Following the death of his wife, he moved to Los Angeles, where he resumed his law practice.

== Death ==
Sargent died on January 8, 1940, at the home of his son in Los Angeles, California.

== See also ==
- Bradley, California
