= Frederick C. Franck =

American politician (1828-1902)

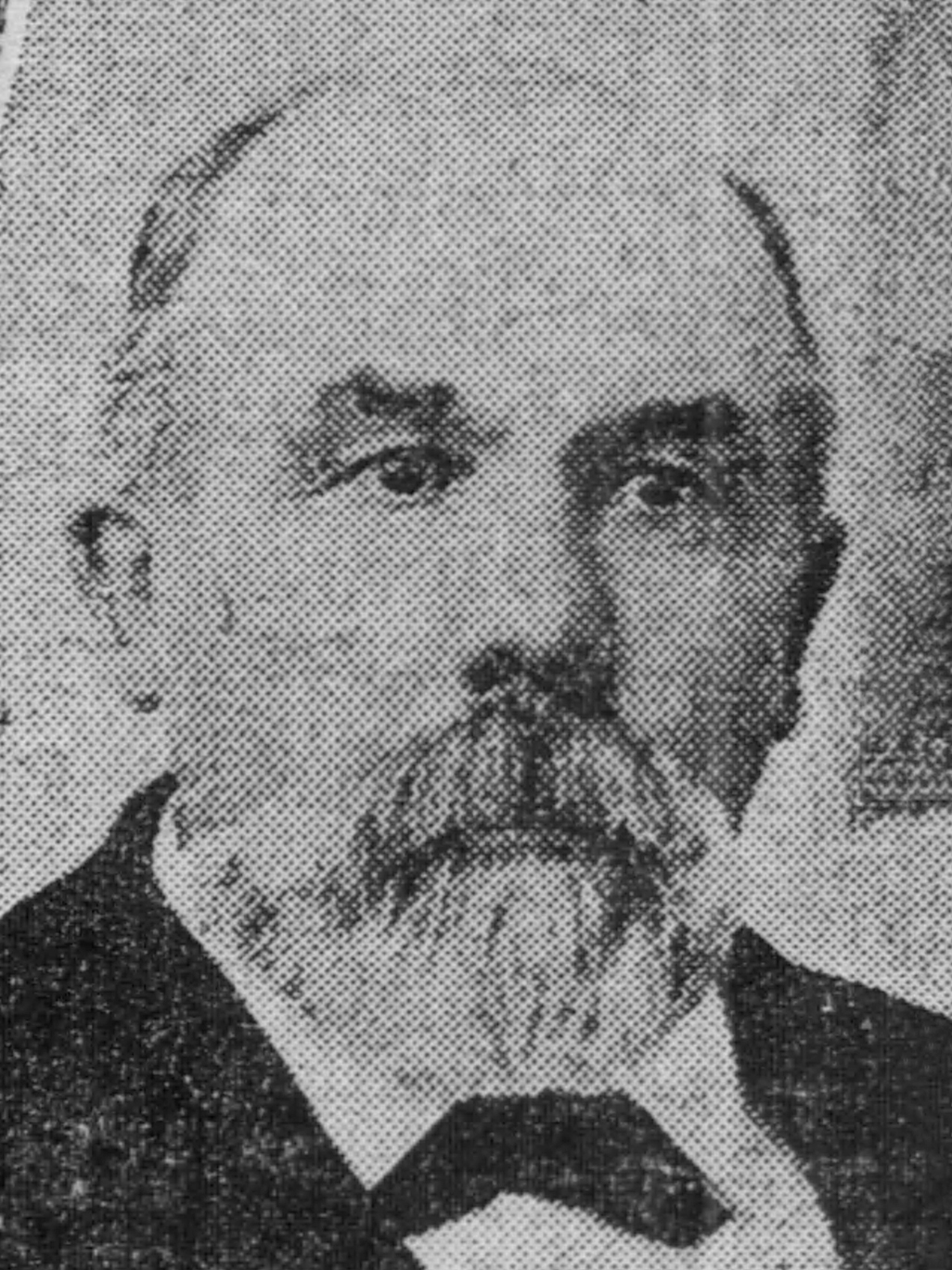
- Franck in 1902
- Constituency: 30th district (1895–1899)

Member of the California State Assembly
- In office 1871–1873

Member of the California State Senate
- In office January 7, 1895 – January 2, 1899
- Preceded by: Vacant
- Succeeded by: Charles M. Shortridge

Personal details
- Born: August 17, 1828 Bavaria, Germany
- Died: September 20, 1902 (aged 74) Santa Clara, California
- Party: Republican
- Children: 2

Frederick C. Franck Sr. (August 17, 1828 – September 20, 1902) was an American politician who served as a State Senator for the California's 30th State Senatorial district from 1895 to 1899. Franck, a veteran of the Mexican War and a former saddle maker turned gold miner, played a role in organizing the Santa Clara Fire Department in 1851. He was a charter member of the Santa Clara Verein, a mid-19th-century German social hall that was a popular gathering spot for the Santa Clara community in California.

== Early life ==
Franck was born on August 17, 1828, in Bavaria, Germany. He pursued education until the age of fifteen before beginning an apprenticeship to master the trade of harness and saddle making in Kaiserslautern.

== Career ==
At seventeen, Franck arrived in America, initially landing in New York. There, he spent almost two years crafting harnesses and saddles for the United States Government, specifically for use during the Mexican War. Departing New York City in 1848, he embarked on a journey that led him through Buffalo, then to Cleveland, Cincinnati, and Louisville, practicing his trade in each city. After a stint in New Orleans he briefly took on temporary roles like chopping wood and clearing land. He then headed to Natchez, Mississippi, securing employment in his trade. In December 1851, he embarked on a journey to California, crossing the Isthmus on foot and reaching San Francisco in February 1852. Spending almost two years in various mines around Yuba, Feather Rivers, Shaw's Flat, Murphy's Camp, and Columbia, he returned to San Francisco later in 1853. In San Francisco, he set up the city's second shop for manufacturing harnesses and saddles. By 1855, he relocated to San Jose and subsequently settled in Santa Clara, establishing his permanent harness and saddlery business there.

Franck held various leadership roles within the Odd Fellows lodge and among the founding members of the Encampment of Santa Clara. It was under his tenure as Nobel Grand that the construction of the I.O.O.F Building in Santa Clara took place. In 1870, he journeyed back to his homeland in Bavaria and embarked on a tour across Europe.

=== Political career ===
In 1870, Franck was elected on the People's ticket, as a member of the Santa Clara Board of Town Trustees for eight years. He assumed the role of Fire Chief in the newly formed Santa Clara Fire Department, a position he held for six years. He was elected to the California State Assembly in 1871, and was reelected a second term in 1873.

Franck represented the Republican party in the Republican State Conventions and as a delegate from the Fifth California District to the National Republican Convention of 1888. He was director and one of the incorporators of the Bank of Santa Clara County. He was a director, and Chairman of its Finance Committee.

In 1894, Franck ran for California State Senate for the California's 30th State Senate district, winning the election as a Republican. He was a state senator from 1895 to 1899.

== Death ==
Franck died on December 20, 1902, in Santa Clara, California.

== See also ==
- California Historical Landmarks in Santa Clara County

Political offices
California Senate
Preceded by Vacant	30th district 1895–1899	Succeeded by Charles M. Shortridge
