= Marshall Black =

American politician (1870–1934)

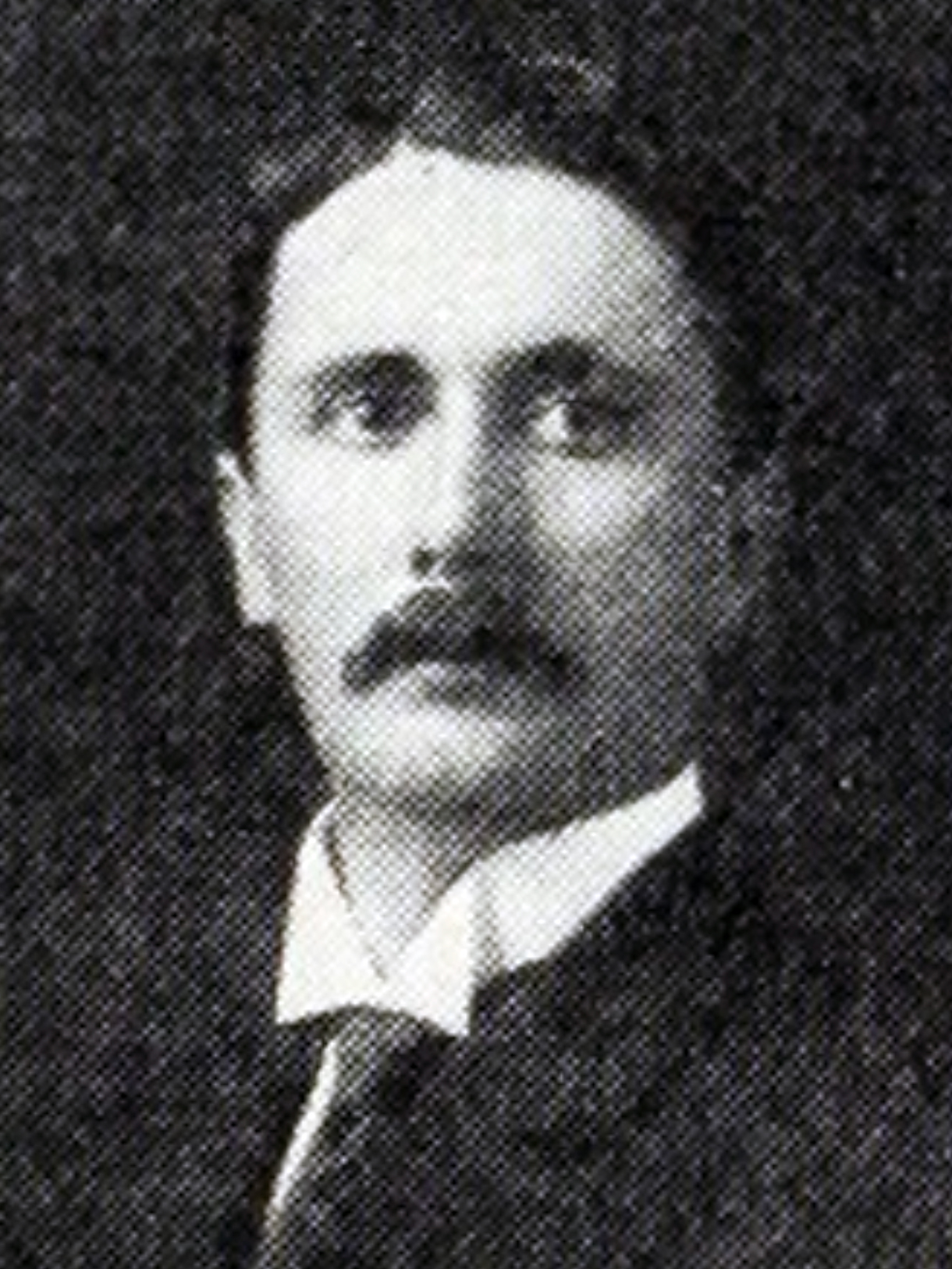

Member of the California Senate from the 28th district
- In office January 7, 1907 – January 2, 1913
- Preceded by: Charles M. Shortridge
- Succeeded by: Herbert C. Jones

Member of the California State Assembly from the 57th district
- In office January 5, 1903 – January 2, 1905
- Preceded by: James W. Haley
- Succeeded by: Fayette Mitcheltree

Personal details
- Born: February 19, 1870 Lewis Center, Ohio, US
- Died: March 27, 1934 (aged 64) San Francisco, California, US
- Party: Republican
- Spouse: Ray Miller (m. 1893)
- Children: 6

Marshall Black (February 19, 1870 – March 27, 1934) was an American politician. He was born in Ohio in 1870, and attended Ohio Wesleyan University and Stanford University. He served in the California State Assembly for the 57th district from 1903 to 1905 and California Senate for the 28th district from 1907 to 1913.

In 1911, he wrote the bill that extended the use of recall election to include local and city officials. Two years later, he was accused of embezzlement for stealing $140,000 from the Palo Alto Building and Loan of which he was secretary and recalled from office. He was then found guilty and sentenced to three years and four months in prison at San Quentin.

He was replaced by Herbert C. Jones.
