= Bradley Varnum Sargent =

American pioneer and politician

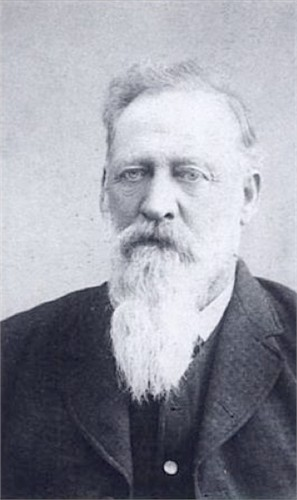
- Sargent ca. 1890

Member of the California State Senate from the 35th district
- In office January 3, 1887 – January 7, 1889
- Succeeded by: Thomas Flint Jr.

Personal details
- Born: February 27, 1828 Thornton, New Hampshire, US
- Died: February 27, 1893 (aged 64) Monterey, California, US
- Resting place: San Carlos Cemetery
- Party: Democratic
- Spouse: Julia Alice Flynn
- Children: 4

Bradley Varnum Sargent (August 11, 1828 – February 27, 1893), also known as B. V. Sargent, was an American pioneer who served as a member of the California State Senate, representing Monterey County from 1887 to 1889. He also owned large ranch holdings in Monterey County.

== Early life and education ==
Sargent was born on August 11, 1828, in Thornton, New Hampshire. He spent his formative years in Boston where he found employment in a bakery.

== Career ==
In 1849, Sargent sailed to California during the gold rush on the passenger ship Edward Everett, which came around the Cape Horn in July 1849 and disembarked in San Francisco. Upon his arrival, he farmed in Calaveras County. In 1850 he operated a hotel in San Jose. He sold this business and invested in a shipping enterprise. Sargent sailed to Honolulu, located in the Hawaiian Islands. His voyage was hindered by the lack of winds, forcing him to return to California nearly destitute. He operated a butcher business for two years in Mokelumne Hill.

In 1850, he joined his three brothers and entered the cattle business in Weaverville, California, in the San Joaquin Valley, under the name of "Sargent Brothers=". They continued in this business until 1855.

In 1856, Sargent married Julia Alice Flynn of Mokelumne Hill. In 1858 they relocated to Carmel Valley in Monterey County, where they built a house. They had four children, including Bradley V. Sargent Jr., who became a Monterey County judge and district attorney.

The Sargent Brothers acquired and developed sizable holdings in San Joaquin, Santa Clara (Rancho Juristac), and Monterey (Rancho Potrero de San Carlos, Rancho San Francisquito, and the land around Bradley) counties. They owned thousands of head of cattle and hundreds of horses. In his later years, Sargent delegated the management of the ranch activities to his sons and his son-in-law, Mortimer M. Gragg.

== Political career ==
Sargent was engaged in politics within the Democratic Party, serving for multiple terms as county supervisor, from 1885 to 1887. He ran for the Monterey County Assembly against C. S. Abbott. In October 1877, Sargent contested Abbott's election to the assembly, but withdrew his candidacy on October 24, 1877. During the first session of the state legislature, Sargent served as a member of the California State Senate, representing the counties of San Benito and Monterey, comprising California's 35th senatorial district. He served from January 3, 1887, to January 7, 1889.

== Death and legacy ==
Sargent died on February 27, 1893, at his Monterey residence, from pneumonia contracted while driving cattle across the Carmel River to his ranch. Sargent Station, located in Santa Clara County, was named by the Southern Pacific Railroad in 1869 in honor of the Sargent family. The town of Bradley, California, derived its name from Bradley Sargent.

== See also ==
- List of ranchos of California
- B. V. Sargent House
