= Herbert C. Jones (politician) =

American politician (1880-1970)

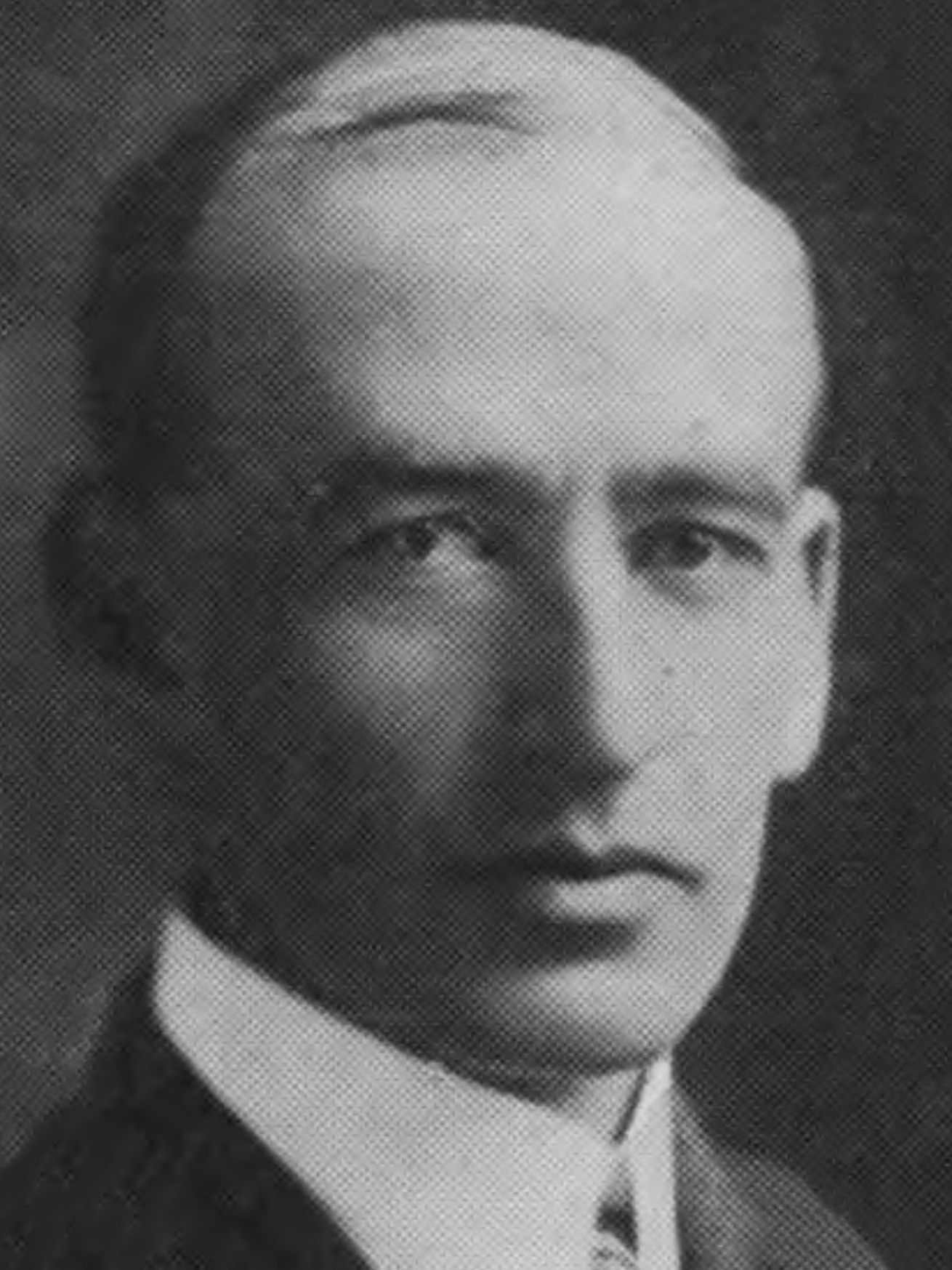

Member of the California Senate from the 18th district
- In office January 7, 1935 – January 2, 1939
- Preceded by: Victor J. Canepa
- Succeeded by: Sanborn Young

Member of the California Senate from the 28th district
- In office January 2, 1913 – January 5, 1931
- Preceded by: Marshall Black
- Succeeded by: Joseph Edward Riley

Personal details
- Born: September 20, 1880 Oskaloosa, Iowa, U.S.
- Died: March 21, 1970 (aged 89) Santa Clara, California, U.S.
- Party: Republican
- Spouse: Pauline Wells Jones
- Children: 2

Herbert Coffin Jones (September 20, 1880 - March 21, 1970) served in the California State Senate from 1913 to 1931. In 1913 he was the successful candidate for a recall attempt in a Special Election against Marshall Black.
