= Charles M. Shortridge =

American politician and newspaper editor (1857–1918)

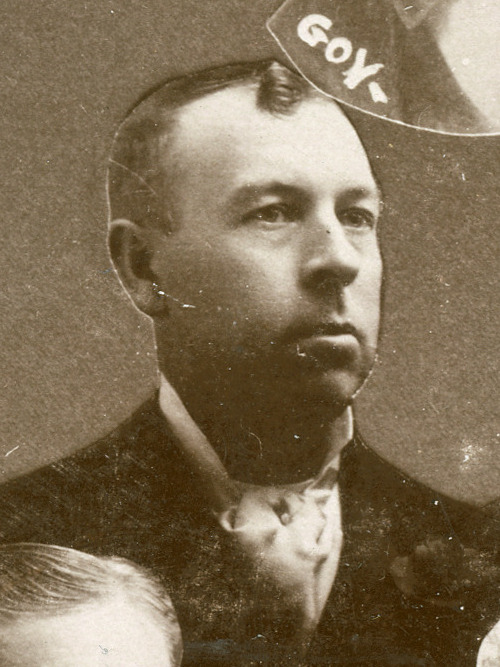
- Shortridge c. 1899

Member of the California Senate
- In office January 2, 1899 – January 7, 1907
- Preceded by: Frederick C. Franck
- Succeeded by: Marshall Black
- Constituency: 30th district (1899–1903); 28th district (1903–1907)

Personal details
- Born: August 24, 1857 Pleasant Grove, Iowa, U.S.
- Died: June 30, 1918 (aged 60) Berkeley, California, U.S.
- Party: Republican (until 1902); Independent (from 1902)
- Spouse: Adele Maude McLeod (after 1881) Elizabeth Wright (after 1899) Delmas Walter Martin (after 1908)
- Children: 3
- Relatives: Clara Shortridge Foltz (sister); Samuel M. Shortridge (brother)

Charles Morris Shortridge (August 24, 1857 – June 30, 1918) was an American politician and newspaper editor who served in the California State Senate from 1899 to 1907 and edited the San Jose Daily Mercury and San Francisco Call.

== Early life and career ==
Shortridge was born in Pleasant Grove on August 24, 1857, to Tabitha Shortridge and Elias Willetts Shortridge, being the second child of the two with his siblings being Clara Shortridge and Samuel M. Shortridge. He came to California with his family in 1874, having his first job as a porter for a hotel in Nevada City before the family relocated to San Jose in 1875. There, he attended public schools in the area and worked for the San Jose Gas Company.

== Newspaper editor and owner ==
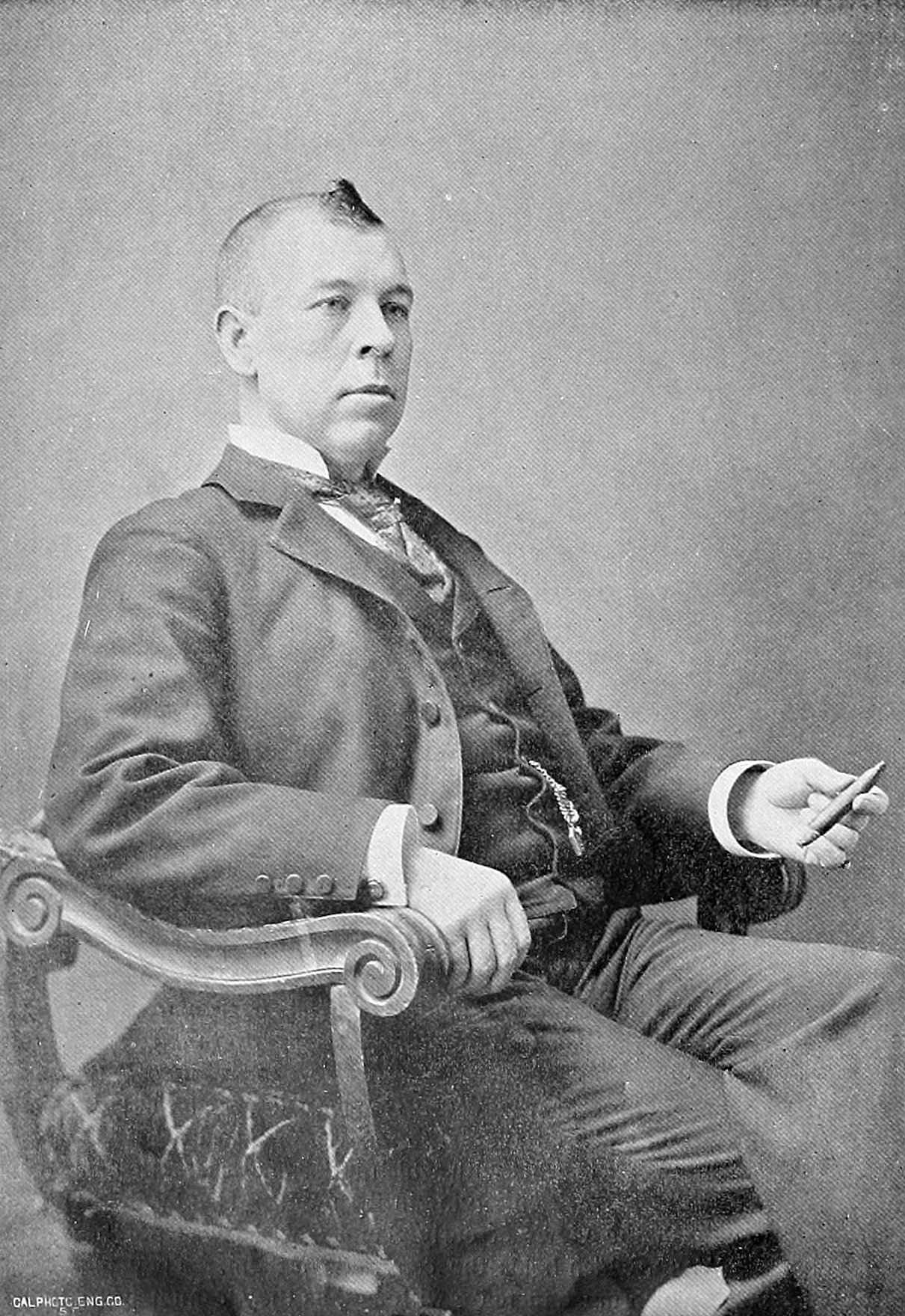
Portrait by I. W. Taber c. 1895

After completing his schooling, he was employed by the San Jose Mercury-Herald as an office attendant. He left the company in 1883 to found his own newspaper, the San Jose Morning Times, which would compete with the Mercury-Herald. He later bought the Mercury-Herald from owner J. J. Owen in 1884, combining the newspaper with the Times Publishing Company. In 1895, he became the manager of the San Francisco Call.

== Political career ==
After leaving the newspaper business, Shortridge started practicing law in San Jose. In 1898, Shortridge ran for California State Senate for the California's 30th State Senate district, winning the election as a Republican. In 1902, he ran in the California's 28th State Senate district due to redistricting, and instead of running as a Republican, he announced his campaign as an independent, winning the election against three other opponents. He ran again in 1906 again as an independent, but lost re-election to Republican Marshall Black.

== Personal life ==
Shortidge married Elizabeth Wright in Carson City, Nevada on July 1, 1899, with the two having three children.

Shortidge was the brother of U.S. Senator Samuel M. Shortridge and pioneering lawyer Clara Shortridge Foltz.

In 1898, Shortridge suffered from severe heart attacks, with one heart attack making his critically ill at the Gilroy Yamato Hot Springs; doctors attending him had expected that he would die within the next day due to his condition. His condition slightly improved the next day only to worsen days later. He survived his illness and later moved to Carson City with his wife.

Shortridge died on June 30, 1918, in Berkeley, California after a year-long illness.
