= Pescadero Creek (Pajaro River) =

Stream in California, US

Pescadero Creek Arroyo de Pescadero
- Location of mouth

Location
- Country: United States
- State: California
- Region: Santa Clara and Santa Cruz Counties

Physical characteristics
- Source: Southern Santa Cruz Mountains
  - location: 2.5 mi (4 km) southwest of Gilroy
  - coordinates: 36°59′00″N 121°37′23″W
  - elevation: 1,820 ft (550 m)
- Mouth: Pajaro River
  - location: 9.5 mi (15 km) east of Watsonville
  - coordinates: 36°54′01″N 121°35′12″W
  - elevation: 138 ft (42 m)
- Length: 9 mi (14 km)

Basin features
- Tributaries
  - right: West Fork Pescadero Creek

Pescadero Creek is a 9-mile-long (14 km) southward-flowing stream originating in the southern Santa Cruz Mountains. It begins in Santa Clara County, California and flows into Santa Cruz County, before joining the Pajaro River, and thence to Monterey Bay and the Pacific Ocean. Pescadero Creek is the center of a critical linkage connecting the wildlife of the southern Santa Cruz Mountains to the Gabilan Range to the south.

== History ==
"Pescadero" is Spanish for "fishing place". In 1861 Manuel Larios testified in the Rancho Las Animas land grant case that "the Castros had an Indian boy who went to this creek to fish". Then John Gilroy testified "the Pescadero draws its name from the fact of our catching salmon there" and "the Castros, I, and an Indian gave it that name in 1814, being a place where we used to catch salmon." Arroyo de Pescadero is shown on diseños from the 1830s.

== Watershed and Course ==
Pescadero Creek runs southerly through the southern Santa Cruz Mountains about 2.5 miles (4.0 km) southwest of Gilroy, California. It upper course is followed by Castro Valley Road, until it joins with Hatfield Canyon Creek at the bottom of Hatfield Canyon. Hatfield Canyon Creek begins on Long Ridge and flows east then southeast to join Pescadero Creek. After passing Hatfield Canyon, Pescadero Creek then crosses into Santa Cruz County and receives from the right Star Creek, which drains the eastern flank of 1,618 feet (493 m) tall Atherton Peak. Next, Pescadero Creek passes to the east of 1,575 feet (480 m) tall Mount Pajaro on its way to its confluence with the Pajaro River, about 9.5 miles (15.3 km) east of Watsonville, California.

== Ecology and Conservation ==
Pescadero Creek hosts spawning runs of anadromous steelhead trout (Oncorhynchus mykiss).

The use of the word "salmon" in the above historical accounts is not specific and may refer to either steelhead trout or salmon. However, Stanford University ichthyologist John Otterbein Snyder indicated in a 1912 report that Chinook salmon (Oncorhynchus tschawytscha) ran in the Pajaro River watershed. In 1953, local Gilroy resident, Herman Garcia Sr., caught a Chinook salmon in Uvas Creek, a tributary of the Pajaro River watershed. Also, two adult Chinook salmon 60 centimetres (24 in) and 65 centimetres (26 in) long were caught and released in a 2005 study of San Felipe Lake, although these may have been fall-run Chinook from hatchery releases.

A series of purchases by land trusts in the last few years have protected much of Pescadero Creek from Hatfield Canyon to the confluence with the Pajaro River. The 1,200 acres (490 hectares) Star Creek Ranch on the eastern slope of Mount Atherton has been protected by the Land Trust of Santa Cruz County. The Ranch is bordered by 2 miles (3.2 km) of Pescadero Creek and harbors 350 acres (140 hectares) of coast redwood (Sequoia sempervirens) forest, oak woodlands and grasslands. It is a component of a critical linkage for wildlife to move from the Santa Cruz Mountains to the Gabilan Range to the south. Just downstream from the Star Creek Ranch, the [Peninsula Open Space Trust] (POST) acquired the 1,340 acres (540 hectares) Pescadero Ranch for $15.65 million in October, 2024. This further adds to the critical wildlife linkage from the Gabilan Range to the south of the Pajaro River to the Santa Cruz Mountains to the north. Then, in January 2006 POST acquired the Sargent Ranch, conserving the lands along nearly the entire eastern bank and much of the western bank of Pescadero Creek from Hatfield Canyon to the confluence with the Pajaro River.
