= Santa Clara County Fire Department =

Fire dept. in California, United States

Coordinates: 37.36°N 121.97°W

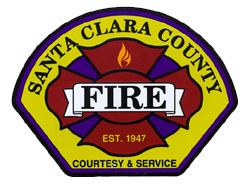

Operational area
- Country: United States
- State: California
- County: Santa Clara

Agency overview
- Established: 1947
- Annual calls: 17,495 (2015)
- Employees: 280
- Annual budget: $97,079,239 (2015)
- Staffing: Career
- Fire chief: Suwanna Kerdkaew
- EMS level: ALS
- IAFF: 1165

Facilities and equipment
- Battalions: 3
- Stations: 15
- Engines: 14 - front-line 6 - reserve
- Trucks: 3 - front-line 1 - reserve
- Rescues: 3
- Tenders: 1
- HAZMAT: 1 - front-line 1 - reserve
- USAR: 1
- Wildland: 6 - type 3; 2 - type 6
- Light and air: 1

Website
- Official website
- IAFF website

The Santa Clara County Fire Department (SCCFD) provides fire protection and emergency medical services to the county of Santa Clara, California. Established in 1947, the SCCFD is responsible for the unincorporated areas of Santa Clara County as well as the communities of Campbell, Cupertino, Los Altos, Los Altos Hills, Los Gatos, Monte Sereno, and Saratoga.

The service area encompasses approximately 128 square miles (330 km^{2}) with a population of 226,700. In addition to their career firefighters, the department is also augmented by approximately 27 volunteer firefighters. Daily 24-hour emergency response staffing consists of 66 firefighters and officers operating out of 15 fire stations with 19 pieces of apparatus and 3 command vehicles.

== Operations ==
=== Battalion 72 ===
	Area	Address	Engine	Truck	Wildland	Other
72	Cupertino	21000 Seven Springs Parkway	Engine 72			HazMat 72, HazMat 172 (reserve), Breathing Support 72 & Battalion 72
73	Saratoga	14380 Saratoga Avenue	Engine 73, Engine 173 (reserve) & Engine 973 (reserve)		Engine 373	Rescue 73
78	Los Gatos	18870 Los Gatos Road	Engine 78 & Engine 178 (reserve)		Engine 678 (reserve)	Water Tender 78
79	Saratoga	19800 Cox Avenue	Engine 79			Battalion 179 (reserve)

=== Battalion 74 ===
	Area	Address	Engine	Truck	Wildland	Other
71	Cupertino	20215 Stevens Creek Boulevard	Engine 71 & Engine 289 (OES)	Truck 71	Engine 371	
74	Los Altos Hills	12355 El Monte Road		Truck 74	Engine 374	Rescue 74 & Battalion 74
75	Los Altos	10 Almond Avenue	Engine 75 & Engine 175 (reserve)		Engine 675	
76	Los Altos	765 Fremont Avenue	Engine 76 & Engine 176 (reserve)			Strike Team 76
77	Cupertino	22620 Stevens Creek Boulevard	Engine 77		Engine 377	

=== Battalion 83 ===
	Area	Address	Engine	Truck	Wildland	Other
80	Campbell	485 West Sunnyoaks Avenue	Engine 80 & Engine 180 (reserve)			
81	Campbell	123 Union Avenue	Engine 81	Truck 181 (lease reserve)		
82	Los Gatos	16565 Shannon Road	Engine 82		Engine 382	Utility 82, Trailer 782, DeCon 782, Wood 782, USAR 1187 (OES)
83	Los Gatos	306 University Avenue	Engine 83			Rescue 83 & Battalion 83
84	Redwood Estates	21452 Madrone Drive	Engine 84		Engine 384 (reserve)	
85	Los Gatos	14850 Winchester Boulevard		Truck 85		USAR 85

== See also ==
- Santa Clara County
