= B. V. Sargent House =

Historic house in California, United States

- U.S. National Register of Historic Places
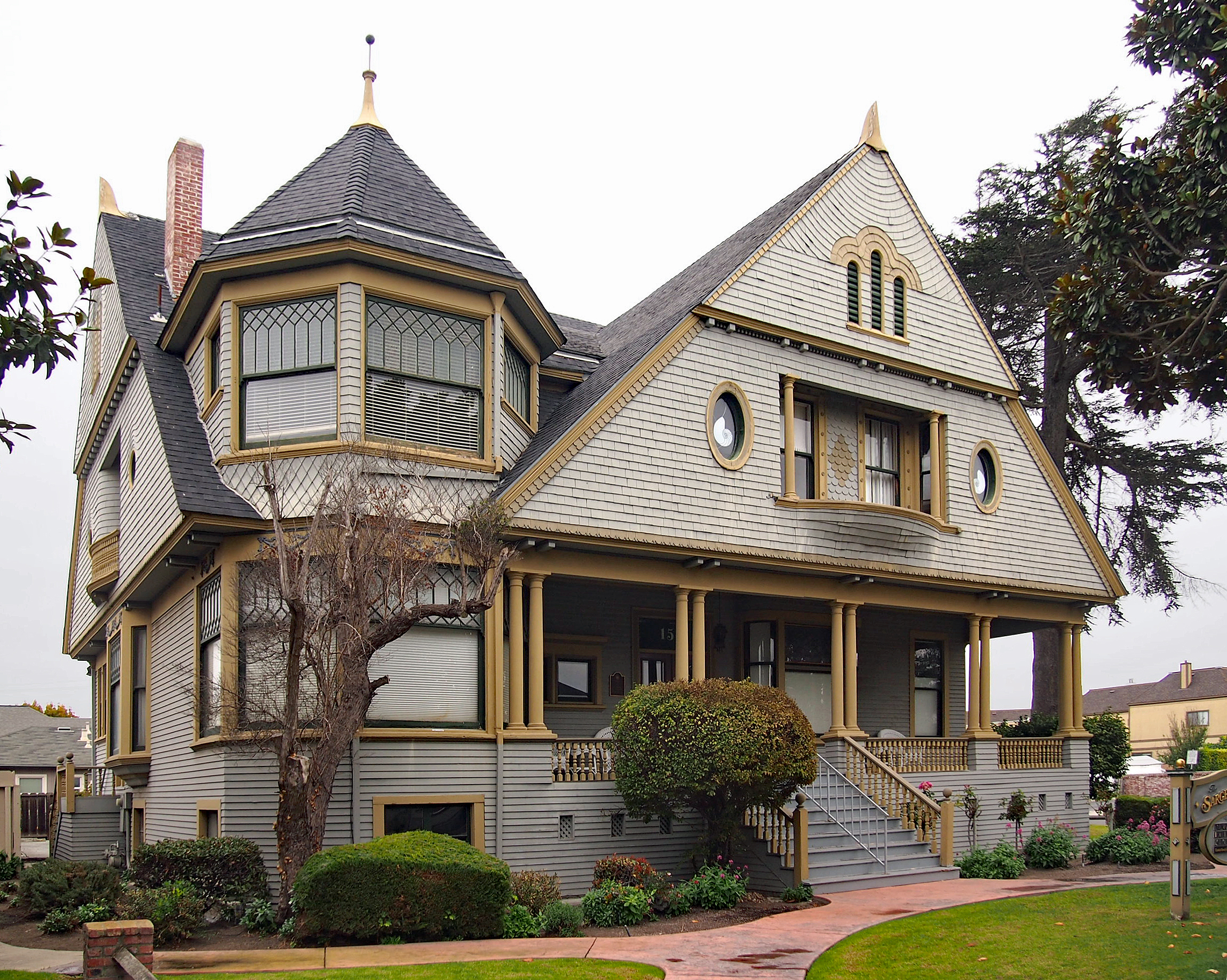
- The B. V. Sargent House from the south

- Location within California Location within the United States
- Location: 154 Central Avenue, Salinas, California
- Coordinates: 36°40′35.5″N 121°39′37.5″W
- Area: 0.3 acres (0.12 ha)
- Built: 1896–97
- Built by: L. U. Grant
- Architect: William H. Weeks
- Architectural style: Modified Colonial
- NRHP reference No.: 80000824
- Added to NRHP: October 20, 1980

The B. V. Sargent House is a historic house in Salinas, California, United States. It is listed on the National Register of Historic Places for representing a change in local building styles and opening popularity in the area for Colonial Revival architecture.

It was built in 1897 for Bradley V. Sargent Jr. and is a work of architect William H. Weeks and built for $7,500. It was listed on the National Register of Historic Places in 1980.

In 2014 it was purchased by the Episcopal Diocese of El Camino Real and renovated as the diocesan headquarters, which was moved there from Seaside, California, in January 2015.
