= Santa Clara Verein =

Former social hall in California, United States

- U.S. National Register of Historic Places
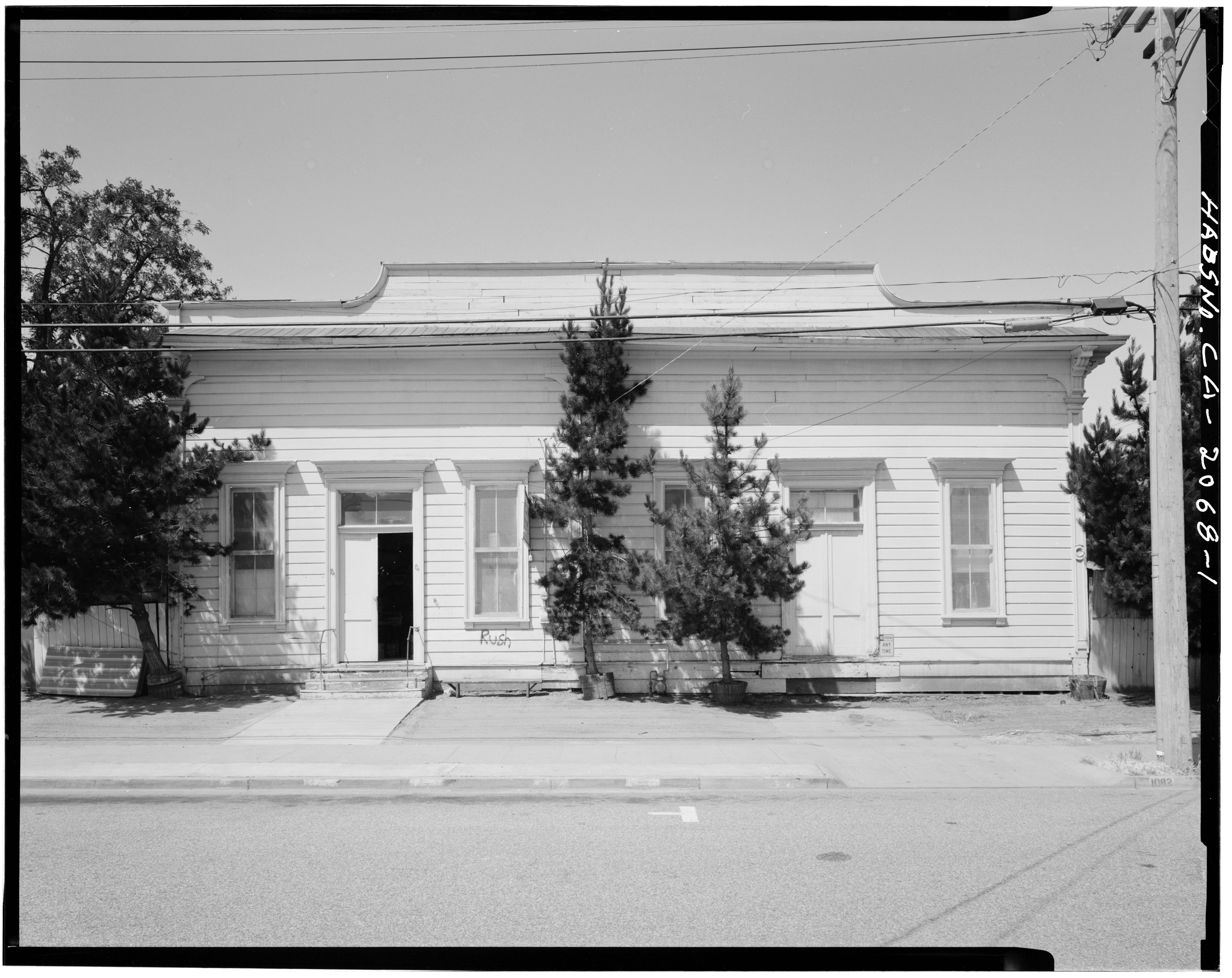
- Santa Clara Verein Building

- Location within San Jose, California
- Location: 1082 Alviso Street, Santa Clara, California, US
- Coordinates: 37°21′05″N 121°56′29″W
- Built: 1868
- Demolished: 1991
- NRHP reference No.: 85000359
- Added to NRHP: February 28, 1985

The Santa Clara Verein was a cultural and social center for the German community in Santa Clara, California, US. Built in 1868, it was listed on the National Register of Historic Places in 1985. The building was demolished in 1991 and is commemorated by a plaque.

== Design ==
The building was a one-and-a-half-story balloon-framed wooden false front structure with horizontal siding, measuring approximately 60.2 ft (18.3 m) by 62.2 ft (19.0 m) and with a corrugated metal rear addition. The 6-bay street facade had two entrances, both with double doors, and pilasters at the two corners that supported a cornice.

The interior of the auditorium had a hand-stenciled canvas ceiling. A proscenium arch with a square opening remained, and a decorative arch suspended from the ceiling approximately 12 feet (3.7 m) in front of the stage was ornamented with Baroque moldings. The color palette was predominately gray, yellow, and maroon, with red line-work accents.

== History ==
German immigrants settled in Santa Clara from the mid-1850s, and increased in numbers through the 1880s. The Santa Clara Verein was founded in 1868 as a Turnverein and social club, and members purchased land at the corner of Alviso and Benton Streets. One co-founder was Jacob Eberhard, head of the Santa Clara Tannery, who later served on the Board of Trustees for the town of Santa Clara. The club building was constructed in three phases: a social hall with a gable roof was extended on the south side by a second gable-roofed construction and later by a rear addition. Construction concluded in 1881. Another false-front building across the street, known as the Larder House and reportedly a former stagecoach stop, was also used by the German American community. The lodge building contained both a gymnasium and an auditorium and was used for dramatic performances, musical recitals, graduation exercises, and social activities such as dances.

By 1881, the club had forty-five members, including prominent members of the Santa Clara community. Membership declined in the early 20th century as German Americans left the area, and anti-German sentiment arising from World War I accelerated the decline, leaving only five members. One of them, Lewis Kline, a beer distributor, acquired ownership of the building and leased it out to a sheet metal fabricator; it was later used as a furniture warehouse and as a thrift shop supporting handicapped war veterans.

The Santa Clara Verein House was placed on the National Register of Historic Places on February 28, 1985. It was then the oldest Turnverein hall in Northern California.

In 1990, the city voted to allow the then dilapidated building to be razed to make way for a Santa Clara University guesthouse for visiting Jesuits. It was demolished in 1991; its former location is marked with a plaque set in the ground. As of 2018, the Larder House was being renovated for use as a student learning center.

== Gallery ==
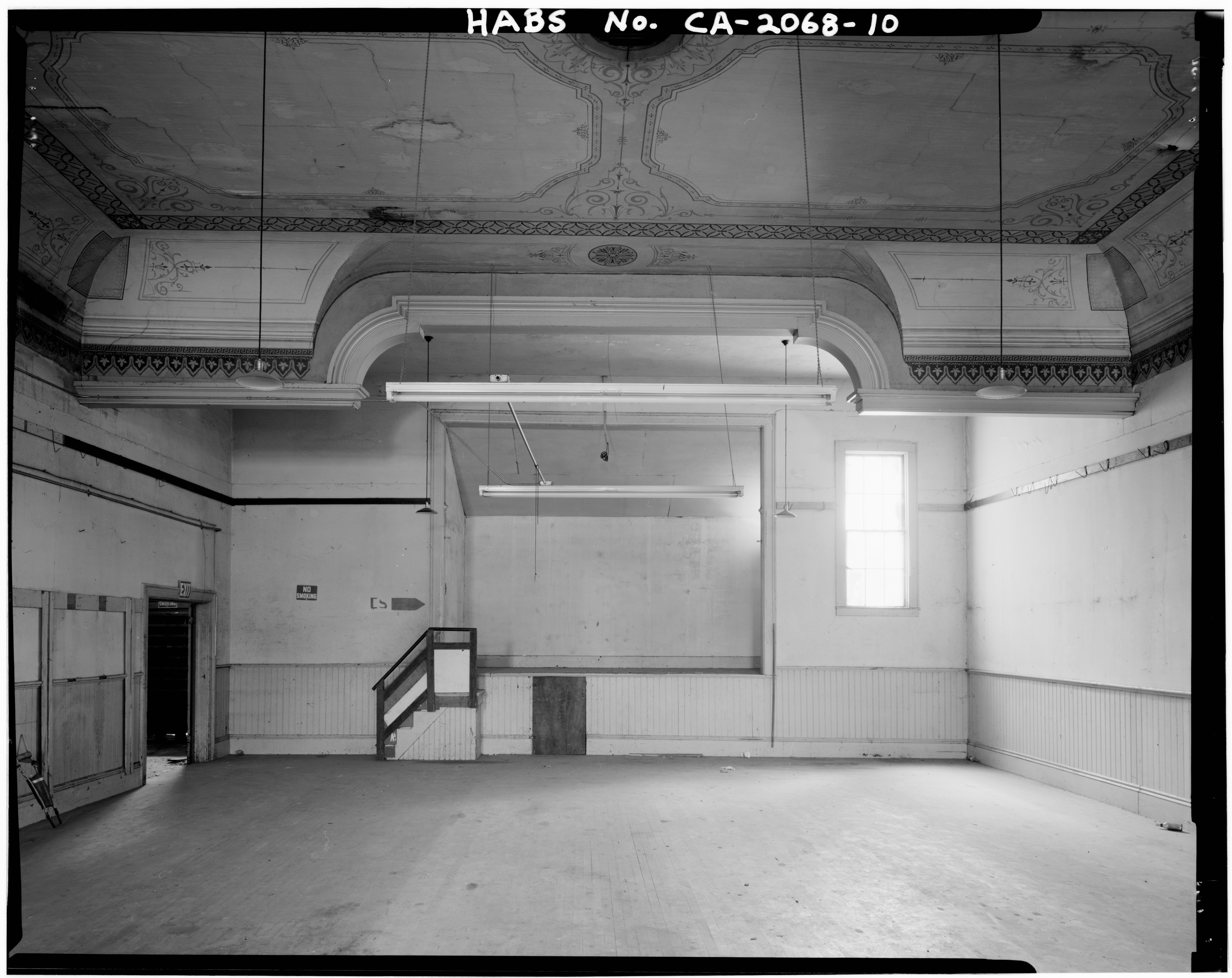
Auditorium interior

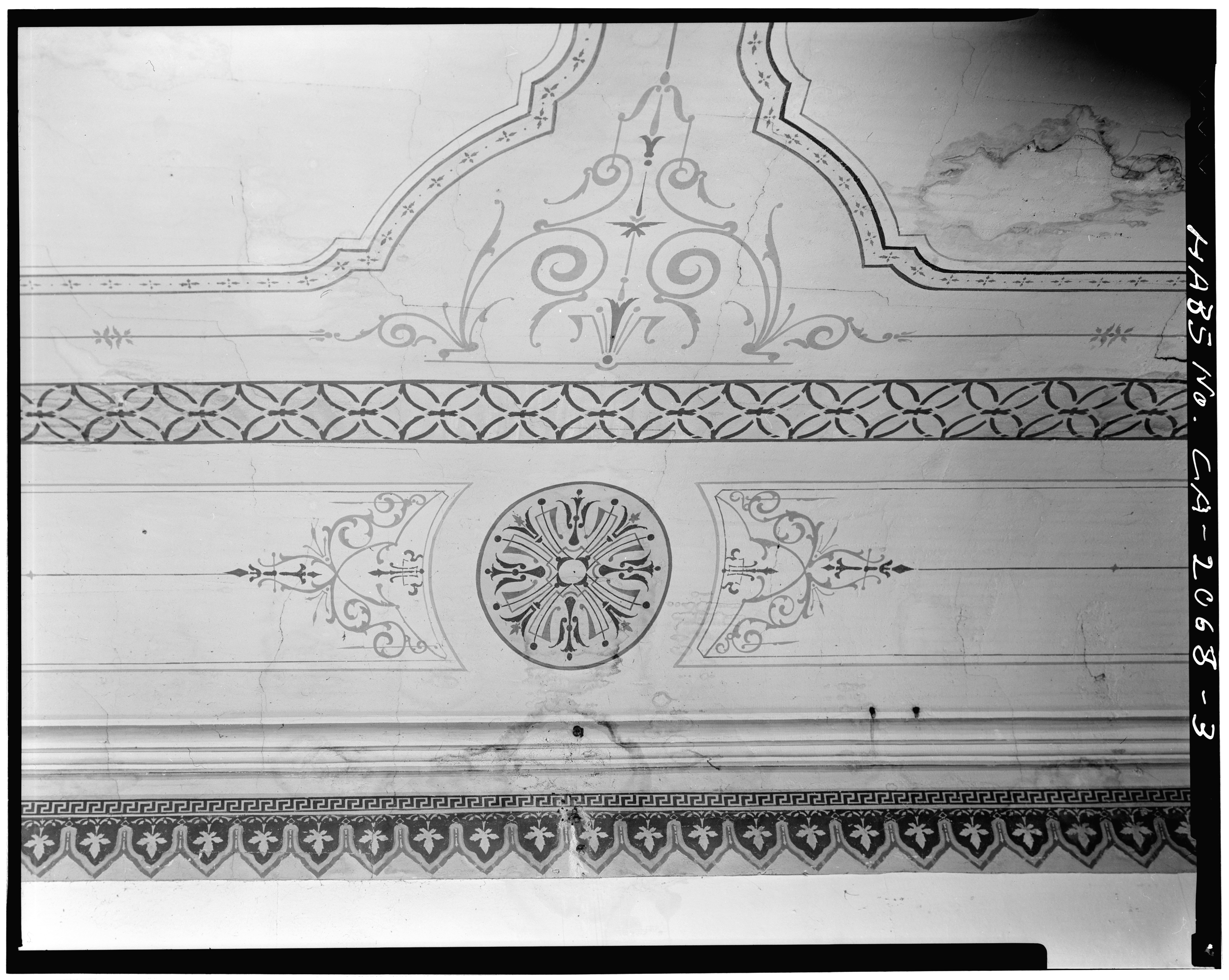
Stenciled canvas ceiling

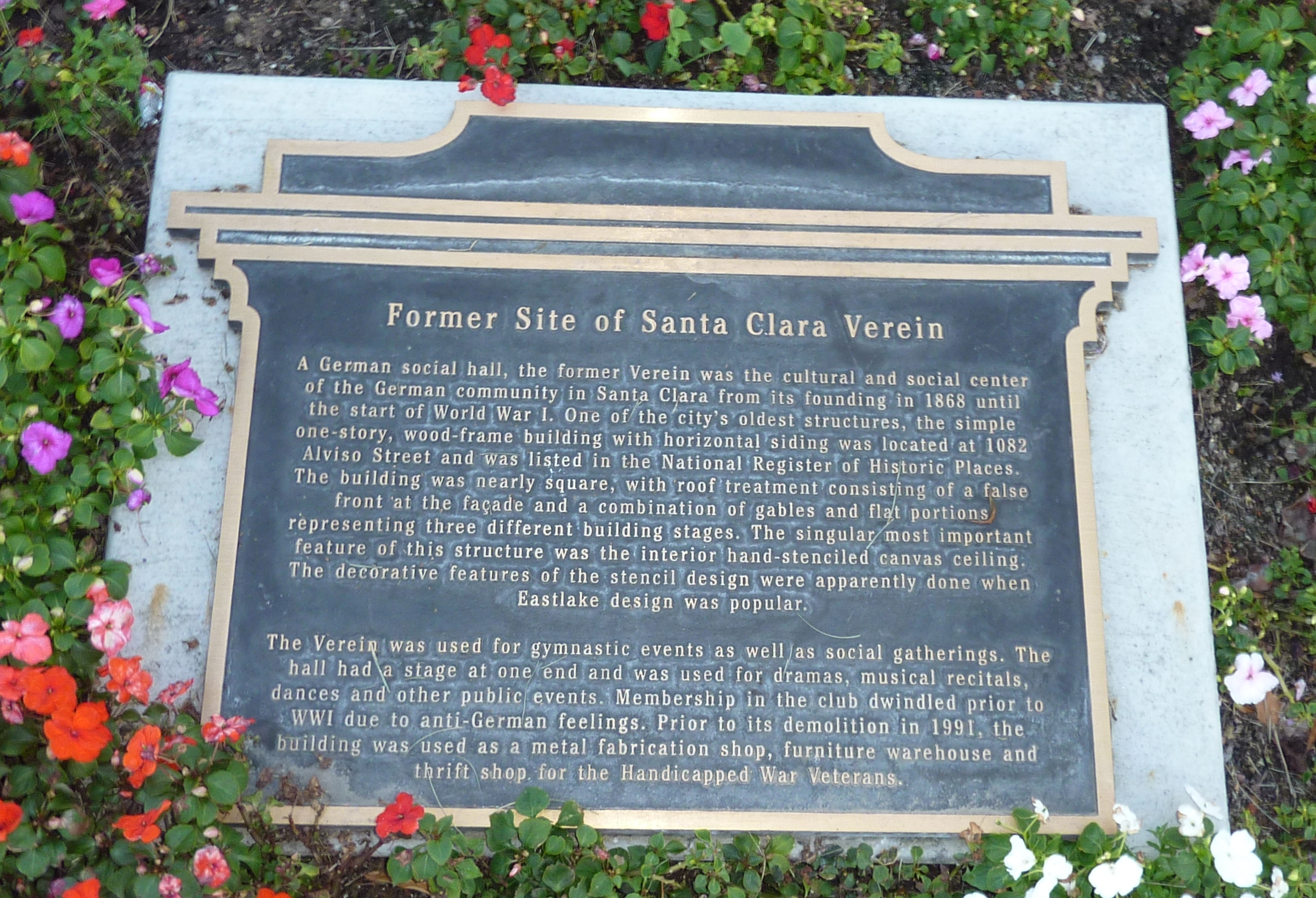
Plaque commemorating the building

== See also ==
- National Register of Historic Places listings in Santa Clara County, California
