= Monterey Road =

Street in Santa Clara County, California

- Monterey Highway
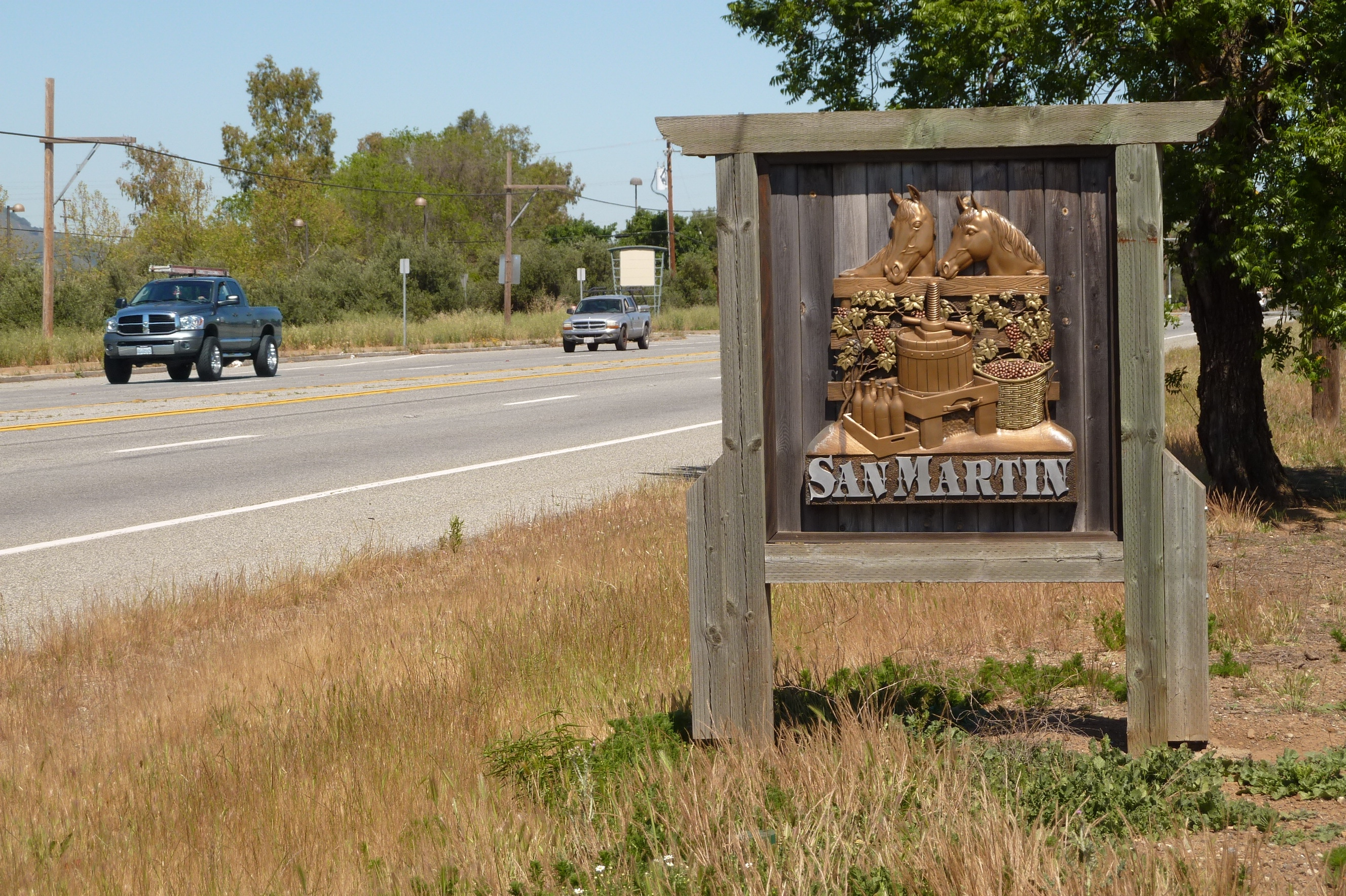
- Welcome sign to San Martin on Monterey Road
- Maintained by: Cities of San Jose, Morgan Hill, San Martin, and Gilroy; county of Santa Clara
- Length: 29.2 mi (47.0 km)
- South end: US 101 in Gilroy
- Major junctions: SR 152 in Gilroy; SR 85 in San Jose; CR G10 in San Jose; CR G21 in San Jose
- North end: CR G8 in San Jose

Monterey Road is a major Silicon Valley thoroughfare that runs from Gilroy north to San Jose, California, in Santa Clara County. It follows the historic route of El Camino Real and is an old alignment of U.S. Route 101.

== Route description ==
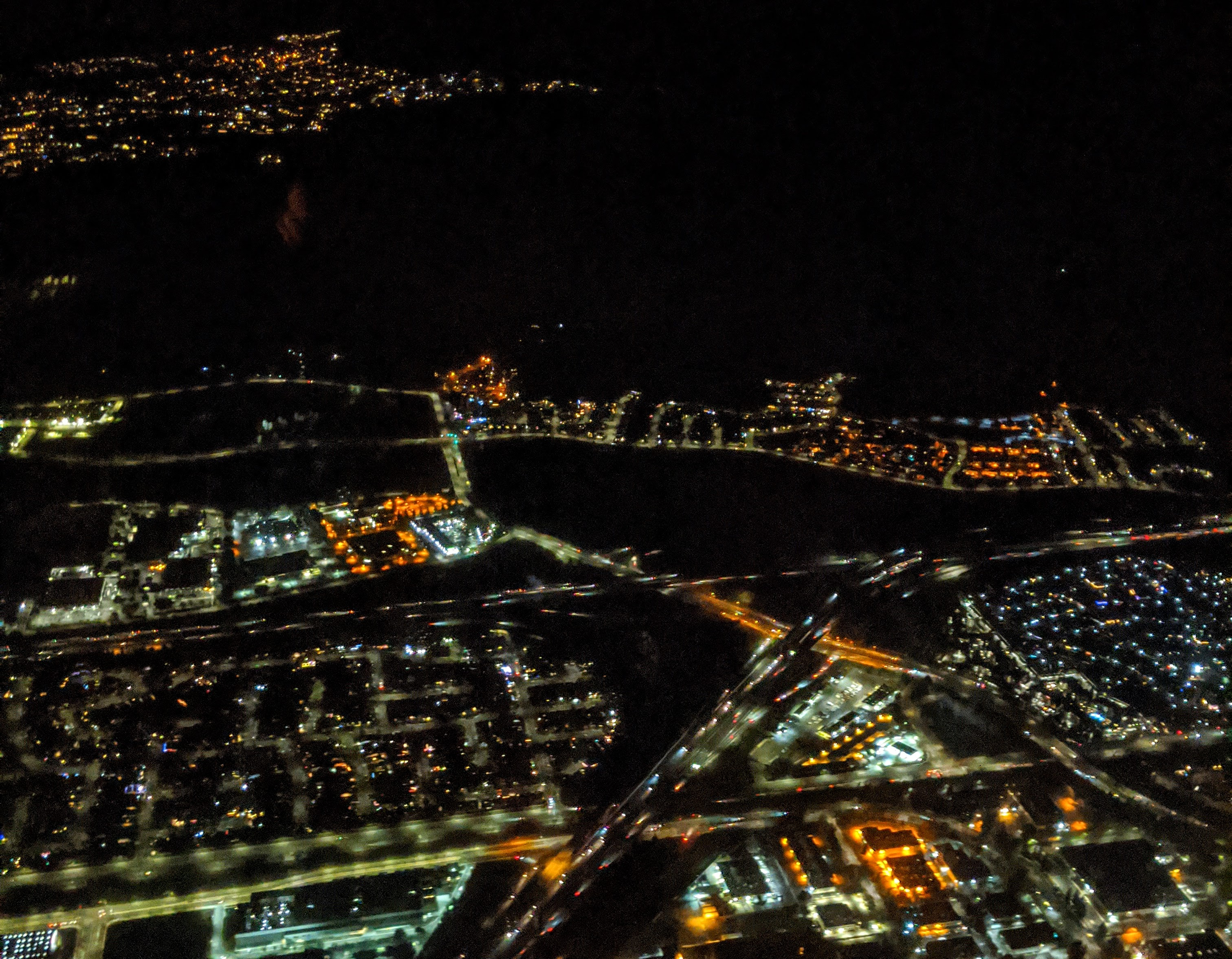
Night aerial view of the interchange at US 85 and US 101, with Monterey Road in the foreground

Monterey Road begins in the southern outskirts of Gilroy, running parallel west of US 101. It runs through Downtown Gilroy and intersects with SR 152. The road then heads northwest through the towns of San Martin and Morgan Hill. Much of this segment runs parallel to the Union Pacific Coast Line. Monterey Road north of Morgan Hill is an outdated and rugged road; it has little changed since US 101 was realigned. The road then heads into the suburbs of San Jose intersecting SR 85 with no direct access to SR 85. After intersecting County Route G10 (CR G10), Monterey Road then heads northwest away from US 101 towards Downtown San Jose. This section from CR G10 to its northern terminus was SR 82 until 2013 when a length of SR 82 was relinquished to the City of San Jose, intersecting CR G21 (Capitol Expressway). Shortly before entering Downtown San Jose, Monterey Road ends at CR G8 (Alma Avenue) and continues northwest as First Street.

== History ==
The road was established as a stage coach route circa 1856, and paralleled a railroad line built in the late 1860s. It was part of the main road connecting San Jose to Monterey, and incorporated parts of the historic route of El Camino Real connecting California's missions. The towns of Gilroy and Morgan Hill sprang up as coach stops along it. In one incident in July 1873, notorious highwayman Tiburcio Vásquez robbed Twenty-One Mile House, a hostel named for its location 21 miles from San Jose along the road, in what is now Morgan Hill.

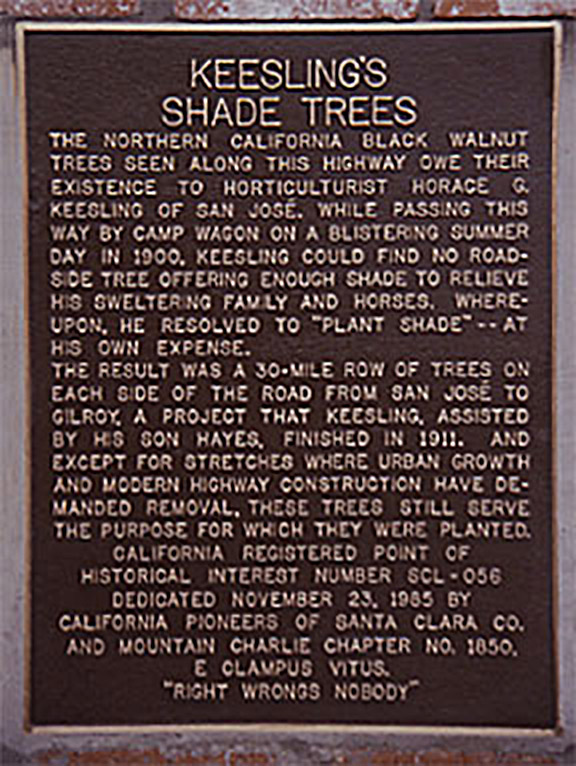
"Keesling's Shade Trees" plaque on Monterey Road

The Northern California black walnut trees seen along this highway were planted by horticulturist Horace G. Keesling of San Jose. While passing this way by camp wagon on a summer day in 1900, Keesling could find no road-side tree offering shade to relieve his sweltering family and horses, and he resolved to "plant shade" at his own costs. This resulted in a 30-mile row of trees on each side of Monterey Road from San Jose to Gilroy, a project that Keesling, assisted by his son Hayes Keesling, finished in 1911. Except for stretches where urban growth and modern highway construction have required removal, these trees still provide the shade that Horace wanted. There is a plaque that is hard to access located on the west side of Monterey Highway (next to the train tracks) in San Jose. 0.5 (one-half) mile south of Capitol Expressway, or 0.34 mile south of Senter Road, or 0.16 mile north of Skyway Drive.

The road became part of the state highway system in the early 1900s and, eventually, it became incorporated into U.S. Route 101 (US 101). By the 1970s, as an expressway with only three lanes (for both directions combined) and high volumes of traffic, it had so many traffic accidents that it became known as "blood alley".

In 1973, the section from Monterey Road's southern terminus to Cochrane Road in Morgan Hill was realigned to a 6-lane freeway to the east, and in 1984, US 101 was realigned to a freeway to the east from Cochrane Road to County Route G10 (CR G10). The segment from Cochrane Road to County Route G10 (CR G10) named the South Valley Freeway was initially 4 lanes in 1984 and later widened to 8 lanes. These two realignments restored Monterey Road as a separate road again. Monterey Road continues to exist as a six-lane arterial road within San Jose and as a four-lane highway continuing to Gilroy, and is used as an alternative route to the freeway for commuters.

Monterey Road north of CR G10 was once part of State Route 82 (SR 82), a route that was once US 101 before US 101 was realigned to the Bayshore Highway (now the Bayshore Freeway) to the east in the 1940s. In 2013, a section of SR 82 was relinquished and given to the city of San Jose.

== Future ==
The City of San Jose plans to reconstruct the 9.6-mile (15.4 km) segment of Monterey Road from Keyes Street to Metcalf Road as a boulevard with bus lanes, protected bike lanes, sidewalks, and crosswalks at intersections. On February 28, 2023, it received a $2 million grant from the United States Department of Transportation's Reconnecting Communities Pilot program, which is funded by the Infrastructure Investment and Jobs Act, to conduct a design study.

== Safety ==
According to City of San Jose data, more traffic fatalities have occurred along Monterey Road than on any other street in San Jose. There were four traffic fatalities between 2017 and 2021 and 42 deaths and severe injuries between 2019 and March 2022. The high rate of accidents is blamed on the lack of a median between the road's six lanes of traffic, which encourages vehicles to go as fast as 50 miles per hour (80 km/h). There are no sidewalks and few crossings at major intersections, even though it runs directly alongside Union Pacific Railroad tracks that serve Caltrain and are planned to serve California High-Speed Rail in the future.

== Major intersections ==
The entire street is in Santa Clara County.

Location	mi	km	Destinations	Notes
Gilroy	0.0	0.0	US 101 – San Jose, Los Angeles; Bolsa Road	Grade-separated interchange; southern end of Monterey Road; roadway continues as Bolsa Road; exit 355
Gilroy	2.0	3.2	SR 152 west (1st Street) – Watsonville	Southern end of SR 152 concurrency
Gilroy	2.4	3.9	SR 152 east (Leavesley Road) – Los Banos	Northern end of SR 152 concurrency
San Martin	7.3	11.7	San Martin Avenue	
Morgan Hill	9.5	15.3	Butterfield Boulevard, Watsonville Road	
Morgan Hill	10.0	16.1	Tennant Avenue, West Edmundson Avenue	
Morgan Hill	11.0	17.7	Dunne Avenue	
Morgan Hill	12.6	20.3	Cochrane Road	Former US 101
San Jose	18.2	29.3	Bailey Avenue	Grade-separated interchange
San Jose	22.2	35.7	Bernal Road	Grade-separated interchange; to SR 85
San Jose	23.3	37.5	CR G10 (Blossom Hill Road)	Grade-separated interchange; former SR 82
San Jose	24.8	39.9	Branham Lane	
San Jose	25.9	41.7	CR G21 (Capitol Expressway)	Grade-separated interchange
San Jose	28.1	45.2	Tully Road, Curtner Avenue	
San Jose	29.2	47.0	CR G8 (Alma Avenue); South 1st Street	Northern end of Monterey Road; roadway continues as 1st Street
1.000 mi = 1.609 km; 1.000 km = 0.621 mi: Concurrency terminus
