= Rancho Juristac =

Mexican land grant in California

Coordinates: 36.910°N 121.560°W

Rancho Juristac was a 4,540-acre (18.4 km^{2}) Mexican land grant in present-day Santa Clara County, California given in 1835 by Governor José Castro to Antonio and Faustino German. The rancho (also called "La Brea") was once noted for its liquid petroleum deposits. Rancho Juristac, five miles south of Gilroy, is the southernmost rancho in Santa Clara County, and encompasses Sargent.

== History ==
Antonio and his brother Faustino received the one square league Rancho Juristac land grant in 1835. Cristobal Antonio German (1790–), son of Ysidro German and Maria Manuela Ochoa, was also known as Antonio German and was a soldier in the Presidio of Santa Barbara. In 1814 he married Maria de la Luz Martina Pena (1796–) in Santa Barbara. Faustino Jose German (1795–) married Antonia Maria de Jesus Garcia (1797–) in 1816.

James P. Sargent (1823–1890) was a native of New Hampshire who came to California in 1849 with his three brothers, Jacob L. (1818–1890), Roswell C. (1821–1903), and Bradley V. (1828–1893). In 1856 he bought Rancho Juristac, where he resided, and it became known as the Sargent Ranch. The Sargent Brothers also owned Rancho Potrero de San Carlos and Rancho San Francisquito in Monterey County.

With the cession of California to the United States following the Mexican-American War, the 1848 Treaty of Guadalupe Hidalgo provided that the land grants would be honored. As required by the Land Act of 1851, claims for Rancho Juristac were filed by Antonio and Faustino German with the Public Land Commission in 1852, and the grant was patented to Robert S. Carlisle, Bradley V. Sargent, Jacob L. Sargent, and Roswell C. Sargent in 1871.

The Peninsula Open Space Trust has acquired the former rancho lands.
