= San Felipe Lake =

Lake in San Benito County, California

- Location within California Location within the United States
- Location: 6 miles (9.7 km) east-southeast of Gilroy in San Benito County, California
- Coordinates: 36°58′49″N 121°27′44″W
- Type: Tectonic lake
- Primary inflows: Pacheco Creek
- Max. length: 0.6 miles (0.97 km)
- Max. width: 0.3 miles (0.48 km)
- Max. depth: 18 feet (5.5 m)
- Surface elevation: 144 feet (44 m)

San Felipe Lake is a perennial natural lake located in the southern Santa Clara Valley, almost wholly in northern San Benito County with its western edge on the border with Santa Clara County, California. The lake is a critical wetland, rare plant, and wildlife resource in need of additional conservation and enhancement.

San Felipe Lake is the terminus of Pacheco Creek, which drains the western slope of California's Diablo Range. Its outflows once formed the beginning of the Pajaro River through a series of meandering sloughs and wetlands, but now flow through the Miller Canal, constructed in 1874, to the upper reaches of the river. The Pajaro River, in turn, conveys its waters ultimately to Monterey Bay and the Pacific Ocean.

== History ==
San Felipe Lake's primary tributary, Pacheco Creek, was also known as Arroyo de San Felipe The San Felipe name is preserved in the names of Spanish land grants, Rancho Ausaymas y San Felipe and to the south Rancho Bolsa de San Felipe, both given to Don Francisco Pérez Pacheco in 1833 and 1840, respectively.

San Felipe Lake was also known historically as Soap Lake. However, Soap Lake is a much larger depression or floodplain between the Sargent Hills of the southern Santa Cruz Mountains and the Upper Pajaro River, including San Felipe Lake. The Soap Lake Floodplain was historically a mix of seasonal and perennial, fresh and saline wetlands connected by swales and sloughs. Soap Lake plays an important role in attenuating flood peaks on the Pajaro River.

== Watershed ==
San Felipe Lake is a sag pond dammed by the fault scarp of the Calaveras Fault, which runs along the western shoreline of the lake. The lake is approximately 0.3 miles (0.48 km) wide and 0.6 miles (0.97 km) long, with a surface area of 0.12 square miles (31 ha), but is estimated to be less than 50-60% of its original summer size since construction of the outflows to the Miller Canal.

Its primary inflow is from Pacheco Creek, but its other tributaries are Tequisquita Slough and Ortega Creek. Tequisquita Slough, in turn, receives flows from Santa Ana Creek, Arroyo de las Viboras, and Arroyo Dos Picachos.

== Ecology ==
Natural warm, shallow, but perennial lakes are uncommon in California, partly because many have been drained for agriculture. San Felipe Lake hosts runs of the federally threatened South-Central California Coast steelhead trout (Oncorhynchus mykiss) distinct population segment (DPS). However, the lake is likely too warm for steelhead summer rearing although suitable for spring growth before and during steelhead smolt out-migration. A 2009-2010 gill net fish survey found the most common fish were Eurasian carp (Cyprinus carpio), hitch (Lavinia exilicauda), and Sacramento sucker (Catostomus occidentalis); predatory fish included Sacramento pikeminnow (Ptychocheilus grandis), non-native brown bullhead (Ameiurus nebulosus) and non-native largemouth bass (Micropterus salmoides). In 1912, Stanford University ichthyologist John Otterbein Snyder recorded reports of Chinook salmon (Oncorhynchus tschawytscha) in the Pajaro River watershed. More recently, in 2005, two adult Chinook salmon caught in and released from San Felipe Lake, although these may have been fall-run Central Valley Chinook salmon from hatchery fish released into Monterey Bay.

San Felipe Lake, which is the central feature of the "Bolsa de San Felipe", is designated as a "California Important Bird Area" by the National Audubon Society. The Bolsa is a crossroads for birds migrating between San Francisco Bay to the north, Monterey Bay to the west and the Central Valley to the east. The Bolsa is also identified by the National Audubon Society as a "bird vagrant trap", a site where bird species far outside of their normal range appear.

Only portions of San Felipe Lake are protected by conservation easement, and new land management conservation easements, rather than limited agricultural easements, are needed to protect habitat for rare species. The current management of natural areas surrounding San Felipe Lake is geared towards ranching and agriculture, which is associated with unnaturally-timed summer water releases, discing (for agriculture), cattle trampling and soil compaction, that negatively impacts the fragile wetlands and adjacent alkaline grassland that fringe San Felipe Lake and its flood plain.

== See also ==
- Pacheco Creek (San Benito County)
- Pajaro River
