= Bradley, California =

Unincorporated community in California, United States

- Unincorporated Community; Census Designated Place
- Location in Monterey County and the state of California

- Location in the United States
- Coordinates: 35°51′48″N 120°48′03″W
- Country: United States
- State: California
- County: Monterey

Government
  - State senator: John Laird (D)
  - Assemblymember: Dawn Addis (D)
  - U. S. rep.: Zoe Lofgren (D)

Area
  - Total: 0.085 sq mi (0.22 km^{2})
  - Land: 0.085 sq mi (0.22 km^{2})
  - Water: 0 sq mi (0.00 km^{2}) 0%
- Elevation: 548 ft (167 m)

Population (2020)
  - Total: 69
  - Density: 802.4/sq mi (309.82/km^{2})
- Time zone: UTC-8 (PST)
  - Summer (DST): UTC-7 (PDT)
- ZIP code: 93426
- Area code: 805
- FIPS code: 06-07974
- GNIS feature IDs: 1660370, 2407899

Bradley is an unincorporated community and census-designated place (CDP) in Monterey County, California, United States, on the Salinas River, 14 miles (23 km) south-southeast of San Ardo and 20 miles (32 km) north of Paso Robles. Bradley sits at an elevation of 548 feet (167 m). The population was 69 at the 2020 census, down from 93 at the 2010 census.

== History ==
The Southern Pacific Railroad reached Bradley in 1886, and a post office was established the same year. The name honors Bradley V. Sargent, who owned the land on which the railway station was built.

== Geography ==
Bradley is located in southern Monterey County at 35°51′48″N 120°48′03″W. It is accessible from Exit 252 on U.S. Route 101, which leads northwest 79 miles (127 km) to Salinas, the Monterey county seat, and south 48 miles (77 km) to San Luis Obispo.

According to the United States Census Bureau, the Bradley CDP has a total area of 0.1 square miles (0.26 km^{2}), all land.

=== Climate ===
This region experiences warm and dry summers, with no average monthly temperatures below 71.6 °F. According to the Köppen Climate Classification system, Bradley has a warm-summer Mediterranean climate, abbreviated "Csb" on climate maps.

== Demographics ==
Historical population
| Census | Pop. | Note | %± |
|---|---|---|---|
| 2000 | 120 | | — |
| 2010 | 93 | | −22.5% |
| 2020 | 69 | | −25.8% |
U.S. Decennial Census; 1850–1870 1880-1890; 1900 1910 1920; 1930 1940 1950; 1960 1970 1980; 1990 2000 2010

Bradley first appeared as a census designated place in the 2000 U.S. census.

=== 2020 census ===
As of the 2020 census, Bradley had a population of 69. The median age was 60.3 years. 5.8% of residents were under the age of 18 and 39.1% of residents were 65 years of age or older. For every 100 females there were 46.8 males, and for every 100 females age 18 and over there were 51.2 males age 18 and over.

0.0% of residents lived in urban areas, while 100.0% lived in rural areas.

There were 33 households in Bradley, of which 12.1% had children under the age of 18 living in them. Of all households, 57.6% were married-couple households, 15.2% were households with a male householder and no spouse or partner present, and 24.2% were households with a female householder and no spouse or partner present. About 27.3% of all households were made up of individuals and 12.1% had someone living alone who was 65 years of age or older.

There were 43 housing units, of which 23.3% were vacant. The homeowner vacancy rate was 0.0% and the rental vacancy rate was 0.0%.

Racial composition as of the 2020 census
| Race | Number | Percent |
|---|---|---|
| White | 50 | 72.5% |
| Black or African American | 0 | 0.0% |
| American Indian and Alaska Native | 1 | 1.4% |
| Asian | 0 | 0.0% |
| Native Hawaiian and Other Pacific Islander | 0 | 0.0% |
| Some other race | 5 | 7.2% |
| Two or more races | 13 | 18.8% |
| Hispanic or Latino (of any race) | 13 | 18.8% |

=== 2010 census ===
At the 2010 census Bradley had a population of 93. The population density was 1,081.4 inhabitants per square mile (417.5/km^{2}). The racial makeup of Bradley was 85 (91.4%) White, 0 (0.0%) African American, 2 (2.2%) Native American, 0 (0.0%) Asian, 0 (0.0%) Pacific Islander, 5 (5.4%) from other races, and 1 (1.1%) from two or more races. Hispanic or Latino of any race were 11 people (11.8%).

The whole population lived in households, no one lived in non-institutionalized group quarters and no one was institutionalized.

There were 37 households, 14 (37.8%) had children under the age of 18 living in them, 21 (56.8%) were opposite-sex married couples living together, 3 (8.1%) had a female householder with no husband present, 3 (8.1%) had a male householder with no wife present. There were 3 (8.1%) unmarried opposite-sex partnerships, and 0 (0%) same-sex married couples or partnerships. 8 households (21.6%) were one person and 1 (2.7%) had someone living alone who was 65 or older. The average household size was 2.51. There were 27 families (73.0% of households); the average family size was 2.85.

The age distribution was 22 people (23.7%) under the age of 18, 5 people (5.4%) aged 18 to 24, 24 people (25.8%) aged 25 to 44, 33 people (35.5%) aged 45 to 64, and 9 people (9.7%) who were 65 or older. The median age was 39.8 years. For every 100 females, there were 111.4 males. For every 100 females age 18 and over, there were 121.9 males.

There were 40 housing units at an average density of 465.1 per square mile, of the occupied units 16 (43.2%) were owner-occupied and 21 (56.8%) were rented. The homeowner vacancy rate was 0%; the rental vacancy rate was 4.5%. 38 people (40.9% of the population) lived in owner-occupied housing units and 55 people (59.1%) lived in rental housing units.

=== 2000 census ===
At the 2000 census there were 120 people, 40 households, and 29 families in the CDP. The population density was 1,135.4 inhabitants per square mile (438.4/km^{2}). There were 42 housing units at an average density of 397.4 per square mile (153.4/km^{2}). The racial makeup of the CDP was 74.17% White, 0.83% Native American, 23.33% from other races, and 1.67% from two or more races. 23.33% of the population were Hispanic or Latino of any race. Of the 40 households 42.5% had children under the age of 18 living with them, 52.5% were married couples living together, 15.0% had a female householder with no husband present, and 27.5% were non-families. 17.5% of households were one person and 2.5% were one person aged 65 or older. The average household size was 3.00 and the average family size was 3.38.

The age distribution was 32.5% under the age of 18, 10.8% from 18 to 24, 32.5% from 25 to 44, 14.2% from 45 to 64, and 10.0% 65 or older. The median age was 30 years. For every 100 females, there were 100.0 males. For every 100 females age 18 and over, there were 102.5 males.

The median household income was $48,000 and the median family income was $46,250. Males had a median income of $35,833 versus $13,750 for females. The per capita income for the CDP was $15,344. There were 11.1% of families and 19.0% of the population living below the poverty line, including 32.4% of under eighteens and none of those over 64.
