= Paradise Flat =

Diablo Range landform in California

Coordinates: 37°13′46″N 121°22′32″W

Paradise Flat is a flat in the Diablo Range, within Henry W. Coe State Park in Stanislaus County, California. It lies at an elevation of 1,224 / 373 meters along north bank of the South Fork Orestimba Creek, just above the Rooster Comb.

== History ==
Droves of wild horses were held at Paradise Flat and Mustang Flat and driven up along route of the Long Ridge Road to Mustang Peak to be joined to the droves of the Joaquin Murrieta gang's horses moving southward along La Vereda del Monte (now County Line Road) at Mustang Peak from Valle Atravesado or Valle Hondo.
