= Pacheco (disambiguation) =

Pacheco is a surname. It may also refer to the following:

- Pacheco, California, United States, a census-designated place
- Pacheco, former name of Ignacio, California, an unincorporated community
- Pacheco Pass, California, a mountain pass
- Pacheco State Park, California
- Pacheco Island, in Chile
- General Pacheco, in Argentina
- Pacheco Creek (disambiguation)
  - Pacheco Creek (Contra Costa County), a tributary of Suisun Bay
  - Pacheco Creek (San Benito County), a tributary of the Pajaro River, in San Benito County, California.
    - South Fork Pacheco Creek, a tributary stream of Pacheco Creek (San Benito County)
    - East Fork Pacheco Creek, a tributary stream of Pacheco Creek (San Benito County)
    - North Fork Pacheco Creek, a tributary stream of Pacheco Creek (San Benito County)
    - Pacheco Reservoir, California, a reservoir formed by a dam on the north fork of Pacheco Creek (San Benito County) a.k.a. "North Fork Dam"

== People ==
- Pacheco (1921-1996) - Joaquín Monserrat, Spanish-Puerto Rican children's television show host
- Bruno Pacheco (born 1970) - Peruvian politician
- Bruno Pacheco (born 1991) - Brazilian footballer

== See also ==
- 25001 Pacheco, a main-belt asteroid
