= Valle Hondo, California =

Landform in Santa Clara County, California

Coordinates: 37°9′0″N 121°25′13″W

Valle Hondo ('Deep Valley'), a small flat in the canyon along the course of North Fork Pacheco Creek in Henry W. Coe State Park in Santa Clara County, California. It lies at an elevation of 1,698 feet (518 meters). Formerly a Native American rancheria, then an overnight camp along La Vereda del Monte, and then for local ranchers, it is now the site of Pacheco Camp in the state park and is located where the Pacheco Creek Trail meets Coit Road, which borders the flat on its south side.

== History ==
At one time the flat was the location of a Native American rancheria. Later Joaquin Murrieta's horse gang used it as an overnight camp for their droves of wild and stolen horses who were enclosed within a brush corral for the night and called it Valle Hondo. Other horses might be added into the drove there. The droves were brought down from Valle Atravesado on the main trail of La Vereda del Monte along the divide of the Diablo Range where County Line Road runs today. The droves of horses were driven down from the main course of the trail, across Mississippi Creek to this meadow for the night and driven back up to La Vereda in the morning before following the route of County Line Road southward passing Mustang Peak to their next rest and water stop at Estación Romero, that later became the Fifield Ranch.
