= Bullhead Canyon =

Bullhead Canyon, is a canyon and tributary stream of the North Fork Pacheco Creek in Santa Clara County, California. Its mouth is on its confluence with North Fork Pacheco Creek at an elevation of 630 feet (190 meters). Its source and its upper reach is at 37°10′08″N 121°19′04″W within the boundary of Henry W. Coe State Park. It is overlooked to the north by the County Line Road, (formerly the route of La Vereda del Monte), that runs west to east along the divide of the Diablo Range and the boundary of Santa Clara and Stanislaus County, California.

== History ==
Bullhead Canyon was originally called Bull Heads Canyon. It was a refuge for stolen horses taken by the Five Joaquins Gang three miles west of the Estación Romero, a drovers station and an important Gang hideout on La Vereda del Monte, (now Fifield Ranch). Bull Heads Canyon was the place stolen horses were kept, in a brush and pole corral, until they could be fed into droves of the Gangs horses, monthly passing along the La Vereda, being taken southward to Sonora for sale.
