= Henry W. Coe State Park =

State park in California, U.S.

- IUCN category Ib (wilderness area)
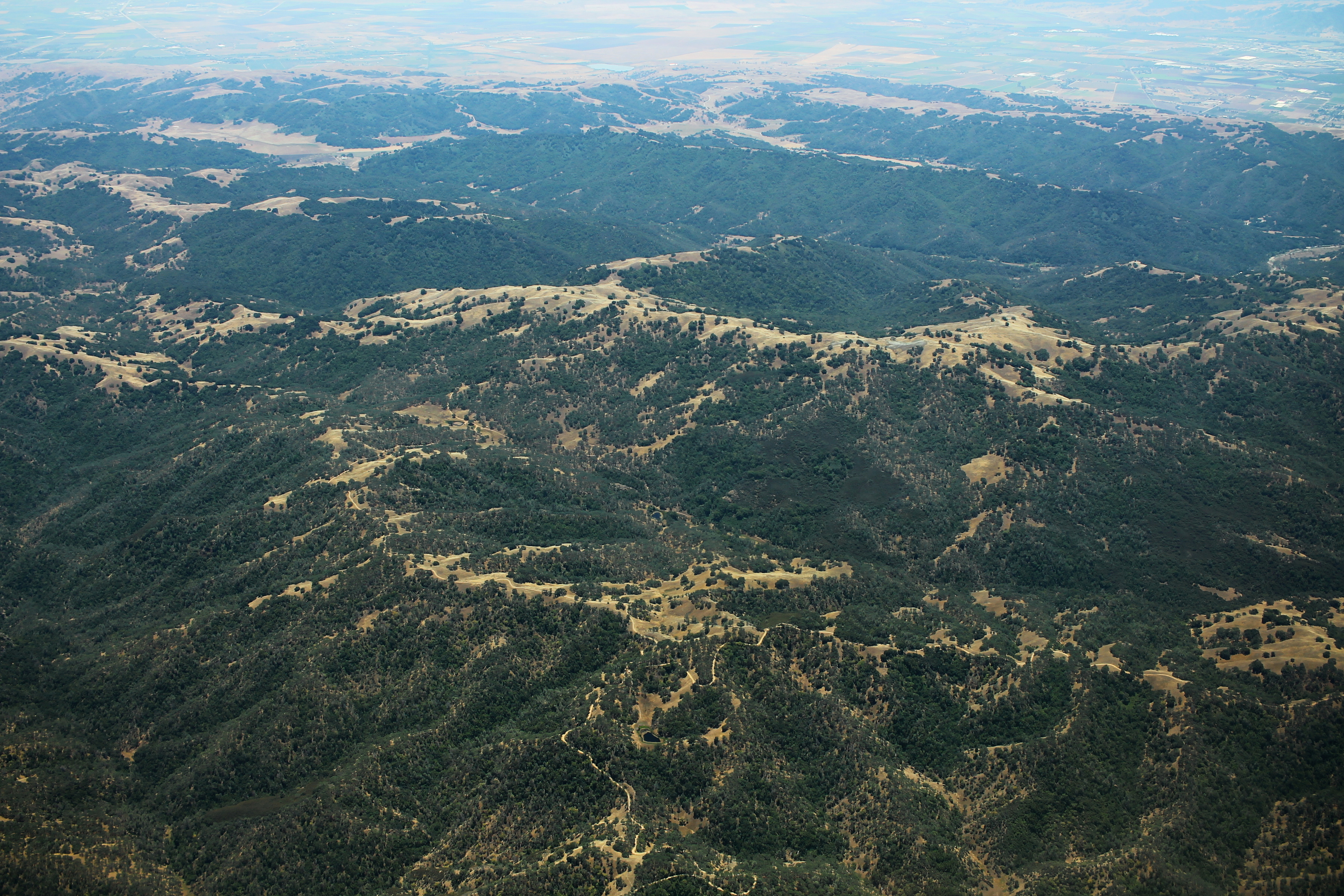
- Aerial view of the Henry W. Coe State Park in Santa Clara County

- Location within California Location within the United States
- Location: Santa Clara and Stanislaus Counties, California, United States
- Nearest city: Morgan Hill, California
- Coordinates: 37°11′18″N 121°32′42″W
- Area: 87,000 acres (350 km^{2})
- Established: 1959
- Visitors: 34,395 (in 2006)
- Governing body: California Department of Parks and Recreation

Henry W. Coe State Wilderness (Orestimba Wilderness)
- Interactive map of Henry W. Coe State Wilderness (Orestimba Wilderness)
- Location: Santa Clara and Stanislaus Counties, California, United States
- Nearest city: Morgan Hill, California
- Coordinates: 37°13′17″N 121°23′34″W
- Area: 22,000 acres (89 km^{2})
- Established: 1985
- Governing body: California Department of Parks & Recreation

Henry W. Coe State Park (often known simply as Henry Coe or Coe Park) is a state park of California, United States, preserving a vast tract of the Diablo Range. The park is located closest to the city of Morgan Hill, and is located in both Santa Clara and Stanislaus counties. The park contains over 87,000 acres (35,000 ha), making it the largest state park in northern California, and the second-largest in the state (after Anza-Borrego Desert State Park). Managed within its boundaries is a designated wilderness area of about 22,000 acres (8,900 ha). This is officially known as the Henry W. Coe State Wilderness, but locally as the Orestimba Wilderness. The 89,164-acre (36,083 ha) park was established in 1959.

== History ==
Prior to its use as ranch land, the Diablo Range backcountry now covered by Henry W. Coe State Park was traversed by La Vereda del Monte, a trail between Point of Timber on the Sacramento River Delta and Cantua Creek in the San Joaquin Valley. Joaquin Murrieta and his gang used the route to drive wild or stolen horses south from Contra Costa County, picking up more from stations along the way, passing into the area of the park from the San Antonio Valley via a trail that closely followed the route of County Line Road along the divide of the Diablo Range. Horses were held at several locations now contained within the park, including Valle Atravesado (now flooded by Mississippi Lake), Valle Hondo, site of Pacheco Camp, Paradise Flat and Mustang Flat. Both Mustang Peak and Mustang Flat derive their names from the activities of Murrieta and his gang. Mustang Peak is where the horses held at Paradise Flat or Mustang Flat were fed into a passing drove.

The park began as the Pine Ridge Ranch, a private cattle ranch of 12,230 acres (4,950 ha). It was the home of Henry Willard Coe, Jr. and his family from 1905 until his death in 1943. Coe left the ranch to his son, Henry Sutcliffe Coe, who sold it to the Beach Land and Cattle Company of Fresno County in 1948. The ranch's road network was greatly expanded during this time. Coe's daughter, Sada Sutcliffe Coe Robinson, re-purchased the ranch in 1950 and donated it to Santa Clara County in 1953, when it became Henry Willard Coe County Park. It became a state park in 1958. Additional adjacent lands were added, and for many years, the park's size stood at 13,000 acres (5,300 ha). Indeed, many currently available state road maps still show the park in its 13,000 acre configuration. The park expanded considerably in the early 1980s with the purchase of adjacent properties to the east and south (the Gill-Mustang and Coit ranches, respectively), bringing the size to 67,000 acres (27,000 ha)). In the early 1990s the Redfern Ranch added some 11,000 acres (4,500 ha) in the south, and since 2000 lands to the west have been purchased for inclusion. The park is still growing.

The northern part of the park, including the Orestimba Wilderness, was swept by a massive wildfire starting on September 3, 2007. Named the Lick Fire after it was first spotted by nearby Lick Observatory, the fire grew to 27,000 acres (11,000 ha) by the evening of September 6, and ultimately burned 47,760 acres (19,330 ha) by the time it was contained on September 11. Fire officials blamed the fire on burning debris within a barrel at a hunting club adjacent to the park. The person responsible for the fire came forward, pleaded no contest to a misdemeanor charge, and was ultimately ordered to pay $750,000 in restitution. All areas affected by the fire were re-opened to unrestricted public access on February 16, 2008.

== Geography ==
Located in the Diablo Range backcountry east of Morgan Hill, CA - between the San Antonio Valley (north) and Pacheco Pass (south), the park consists of a series of high ridges separated by steep walled canyons, with occasional level valley bottoms and distinct peaks. Most of the ridges run around 2,000 to 3,000 feet (610 to 910 m) in elevation, with canyon bottoms usually around 1,000 to 1,500 feet (300 to 460 m) above sea level.

The highest point in the park is on the northernmost boundary, at about 3,560 feet (1,090 m) elevation. This point may be considered to be on the slopes of Mt. Stakes, a mile north of the park's northern boundary. (Mt. Stakes, at 3,804 feet (1,159 m), is the highest point in Stanislaus County). The lowest point in the park is at the Bell Station access point in the southeast; this is only a little above 300 feet (91 m) in elevation. Since this is a mere strip of land along a road right-of-way, it is often not thought of as an integral part of the state park. The lowest point in the main body of the park is the place where the North Fork of Pacheco Creek flows out, at about 710 feet (220 m) elevation, also in the southeast corner.

Prominent ridges and peaks in the park, from west to east and north to south, include Pine Ridge, Middle Ridge, Blue Ridge (with Mount Sizer the highest point), Rock House Ridge, Bear Mountain, Bear Mountain Peak, Robison Mountain (not Robinson Mountain as it is too often misspelled), Rooster Comb, Palassou Ridge, Mahoney Ridge (and Mahoney Meadows), Willow Ridge, Pacheco Ridge, Mustang Peak, Walsh Peak, Willson Field Hill, Wasno Ridge, Burra Burra Peak, Willson Peak, Rock Springs Peak, and Phegley Ridge. The park is divided into 13 zones on the official map. From West to East, and North to South, they are:

1. Western Zone (Park HQ)
2. Blue Ridge Zone (Mt Sizer, Hat Rock)
3. Interior Zone (Bear Mountain)
4. Mississippi Zone
5. Orestimba Wilderness Zone
6. Mustang Peak Zone
7. Mahoney Zone
8. Coit Zone
9. Pacheco Zone (Dowdy Ranch Entrance)
10. Grizzly Gulch Zone
11. Kelly Zone
12. Dormida Zone
13. Phegley Zone (Bill's Hill, Redfern Pond)

The park map also shows 1) Thomas Addition (near Mt. Sizer) and 2) Lakeview Addition (just below the park's HQ) to which there is no public access as of now (late 2013), nor any plans yet to make those areas accessible to public.

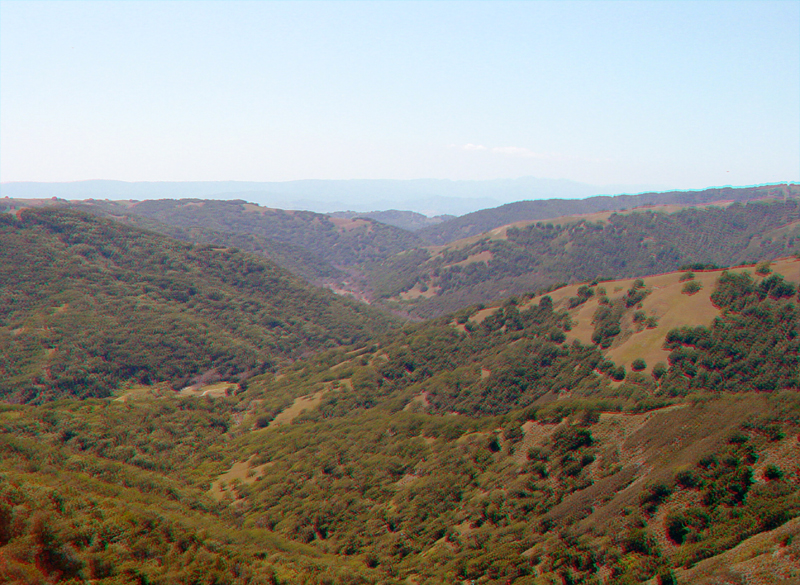
Looking west over Hunting Hollow, at the south end of the park

The area encompasses parts of three major watersheds: Coyote Creek, Orestimba Creek, and Pacheco Creek. Coyote Creek is fed by Grizzly Creek, the Little, Middle, and East Forks of Coyote Creek, Kelly Cabin Canyon, Grizzly Gulch (not be confused with Grizzly Creek), and Hunting Hollow. Coyote Creek flows into Coyote Lake and Anderson Lake, and then north through San Jose into the San Francisco Bay. The South Fork Orestimba Creek originates in the park, and is fed by Red Creek, Pinto and Robinson creeks, and Lion Canyon. After joining the North Fork outside the park, it flows out to the San Joaquin Valley, where it joins the San Joaquin River. The latter runs more or less north and, if it were not diverted, would flow out to San Pablo Bay. The North Fork Pacheco Creek also originates within the park, and it is fed by Mississippi Creek. Cañada de la Dormida independently reaches Pacheco Creek outside of the park boundaries. If not diverted, the waters of Pacheco Creek would eventually reach Monterey Bay via the Pajaro River. There is a fourth, minor watershed within the park: the small creeks of the Upper San Antonio Valley in the north flow into San Antonio Creek north of the park. This, in turn, joins Arroyo Valle, which flows into Alameda Creek, then flows into San Francisco Bay west of the city of Fremont.

The creeks are all seasonal; none of them flow year-round, though all have holes in which water may be found during all seasons. Depending on rainfall and temperatures, the creeks generally flow from November to May. After heavy rainfall, the creeks can become impassable, raging torrents, though usually they are not difficult to ford if one does not mind getting wet or (in winter and early spring) cold.

The park contains dozens of reservoirs created by the former ranch owners for watering cattle and for recreational fishing and hunting. The largest is Mississippi Lake, at about 32 acres (13 ha) and .75 miles (1.2 km) long. Other notables are Coit, Kelly, Jackrabbit, and Paradise lakes.

== Ecology ==
The park protects part of the California interior chaparral and woodlands ecoregion. Large parts of the park are covered in chaparral and oak woodlands.

=== Plant life ===
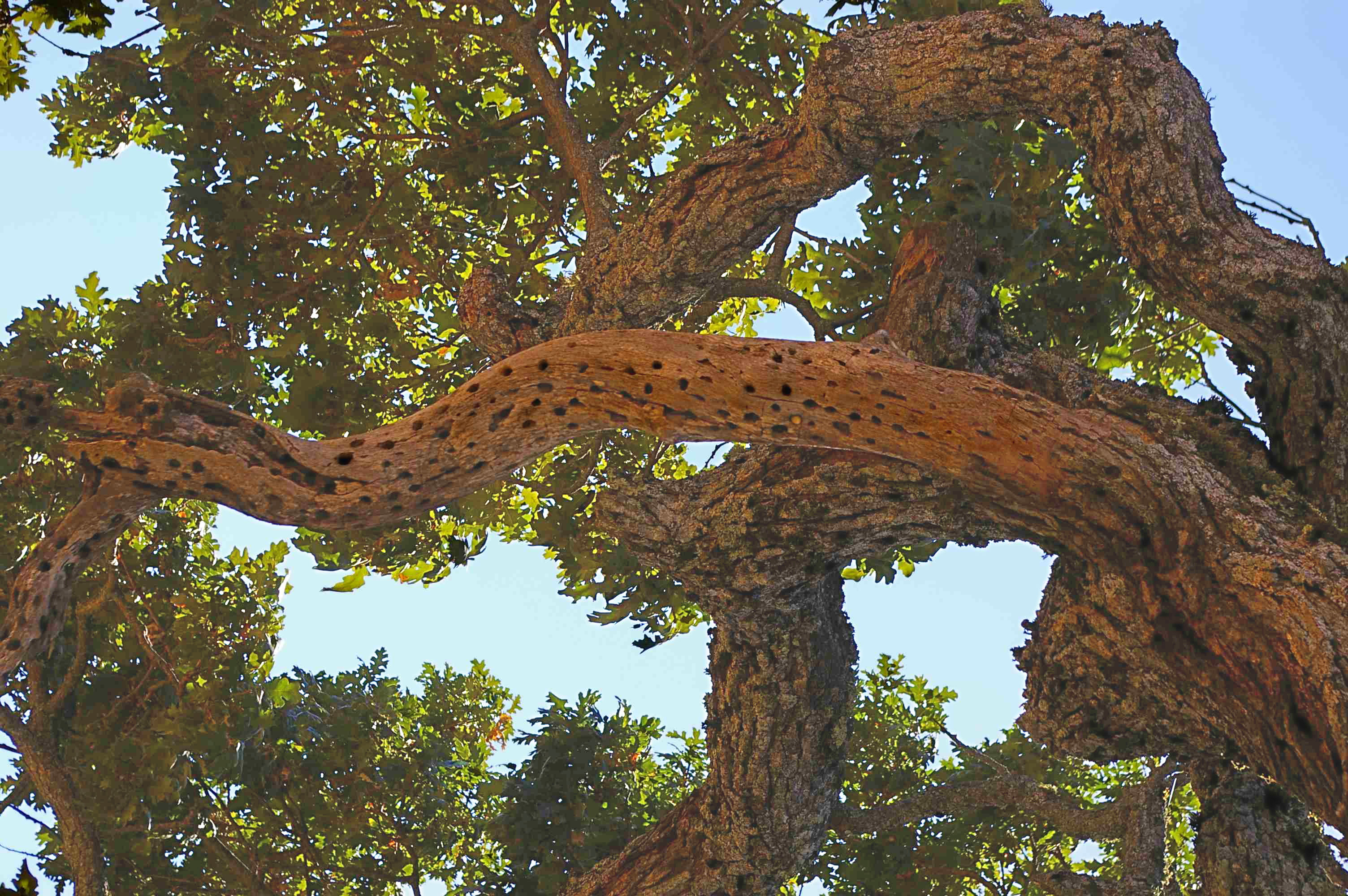
Branch of a valley oak showing a woodpecker granary

Besides its size, the park is notable for a mostly intact flora. Unlike many other Bay Area parks, there are no large stands of non-native trees or shrubs. There are forested ridge-tops and slopes interspersed with chaparral and grasslands, with some creeks supporting distinct riparian vegetation.

Native trees which dominate the park include valley oak (Quercus lobata), blue oak (Q. douglasii), coast live oak (Q. agrifolia), canyon live oak (Q. chrysolepis), interior live oak (Q. wislizenii), gray pine (Pinus sabiniana), ponderosa pine (P. ponderosa), Pacific madrone (Arbutus menziesii), California laurel (Umbellularia californica), California buckeye (Aesculus californica), white alder (Alnus rhombifolia), California juniper (Juniperus californica), blue elderberry (Sambucus mexicana) and California sycamore (Platanus racemosa). Big-berry Manzanita (Arctostaphylos glauca) reach remarkable size within the park (over 20 feet (6 m) tall) and can grow as either small trees or large shrubs. Other prominent shrubs and wildflowers include chamise (Adenostoma fasciculatum), toyon (Heteromeles arbutifolia), coyote brush (Baccharis pilularis), California sagebrush (Artemisia californica), eastwood manzanita (Arctostaphylos glandulosa), yerba santa (Eriodictyon californicum), buckbrush (Ceanothus cuneatus), California gooseberry (Ribes californicum), fuchsia-flowered gooseberry (Ribes speciosum), yellow mariposa lily (Calochortus luteus) and mountain mahogany (Cercocarpus betuloides).

Of the trees, blue oak is the most common and widespread. It is most noticeable in the eastern side of the park, where it often forms pure stands. In other areas it may be dominated by other trees, but if the habitat will support trees, blue oak is usually there. Gray pine is also almost ubiquitous throughout, but curiously, is absent in much of the far southwestern portion, perhaps because of the influence of summer fog, rare elsewhere.

Ponderosa pines dominate parts of three ridges in the west: Pine, Middle, and Blue, usually crowning the summits, but often extending down into cooler canyon slopes. They are rarely very dense, and visitors accustomed to seeing ponderosa pine forests in the Sierra Nevada may come to two opposite, and fallacious, conclusions: 1) That the pines were logged, and all we see left is a small percentage of survivors; or 2) that they were all planted. In reality, there is no evidence (stumps, historical accounts) that any significant logging took place, nor does the relatively wide extent of the stands and the great variety of age groups support a tree-planting theory. Most likely, the pines are relicts of a broader distribution during cooler climates. When the climate warmed, the only places the trees could survive were up on the high cooler ridges and shady slopes where they grow today.

Chamise is undoubtedly the most abundant shrub in Coe Park, covering acres of hot, dry slopes and poor soils.

=== Animal life ===
Wildlife in the park is abundant. Large mammals making their home within Coe include blacktailed deer, tule elk, non-native wild pig, coyote, bobcat, and mountain lion (a.k.a. cougar, puma). Smaller mammals include raccoon, gray fox, striped skunk, Beechey ground squirrel, black-tailed jackrabbit, badger, and brush rabbit. About 170 species of birds have been recorded in the park. Among these are: red-tailed hawk, golden eagle, bald eagle, turkey vulture, raven, scrub jay, Steller's jay, great horned owl, acorn woodpecker, California quail, western bluebird, and the non-native wild turkey. Common reptiles include western pond turtle, western fence lizard, northern alligator lizard, western skink, coast horned lizard, Pacific gopher snake, California kingsnake, western rattlesnake, ringneck snake, and western aquatic garter snake. Amphibians most seen (or heard) include Pacific tree frog, the non-native bullfrog, and California newt.

Once common, but now extinct in the region, were the California grizzly bear and California condor, although condors have recently flown over the park in 2020.

== Development and facilities ==
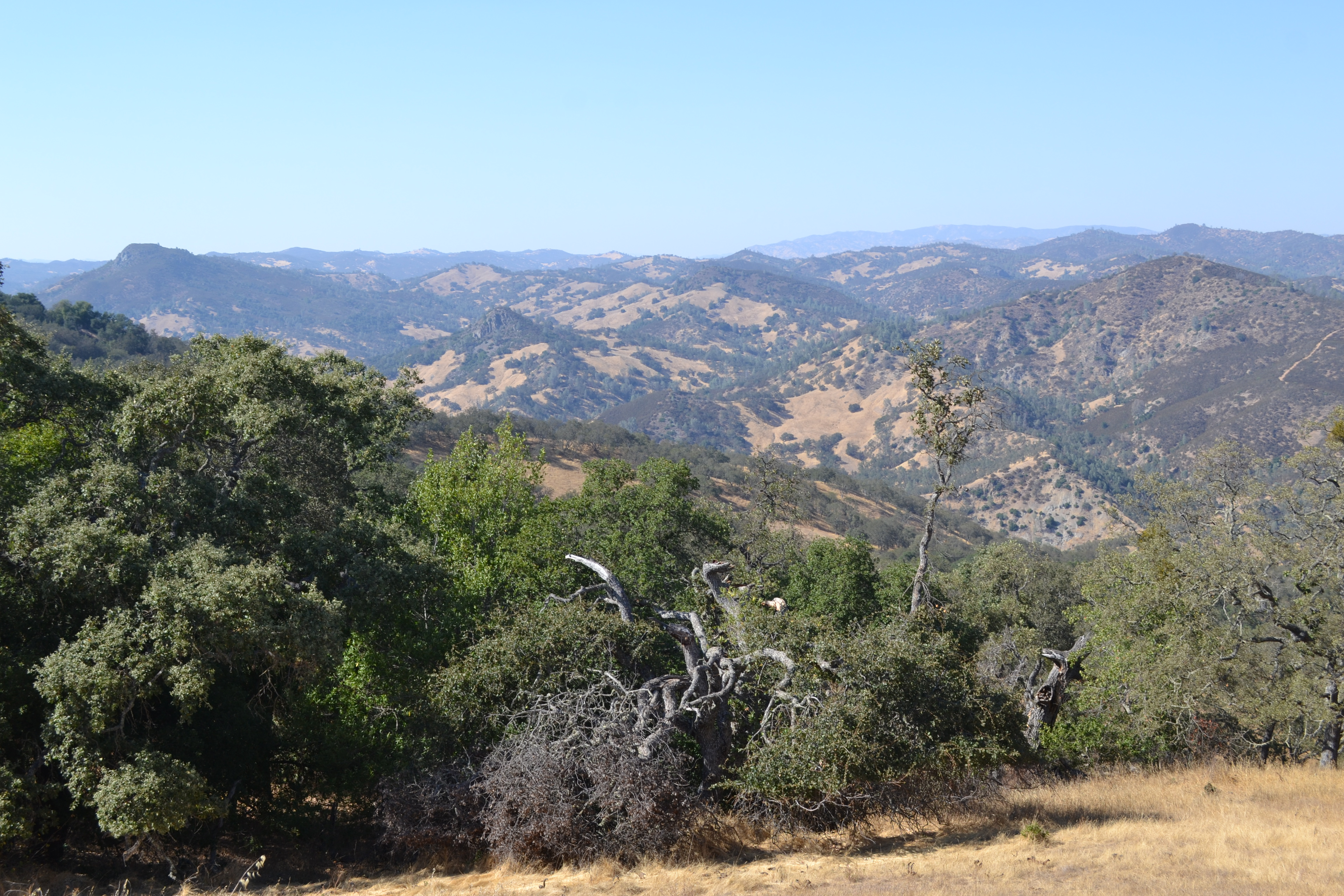
A view of the park close to Dowdy Ranch Visitor Center.

The park has few facilities. The most developed area is at Coe Headquarters located at the historic Pine Ridge Ranch. Next to the historic ranch house, there is a visitor center which features exhibits about the old ranch life, a small museum and books store, and a registration/information desk. A 20-unit campground on a nearby open area provides spaces for tents and small recreational vehicles. There is a horse camp at Coe Headquarters, but is limited to a single parking space behind the old ranch house. Two paddocks are available for horses and water for horses can be obtained across the access road. Other structures at Coe Headquarters are a historic wood barn, a metal barn from the 1950s, a garage with attached black smith shop, potable water tanks, and two employee residences. This area is at the end of East Dunne Avenue, about 14 miles (23 km) east of downtown Morgan Hill.

Another access point is the Hunting Hollow parking area off Gilroy Hot Springs Road just east of La Canada road. This area is more primitive, with no piped water available and only a chemical toilet. The Hunting Hollow access is best for casual walkers and bikers, as the 3-mile (4.8 km) valley trail is level, without any steep hills to traverse. This is a good access for spring wildflower viewing. Parking is available for equestrian trailers and trucks.

The Coyote Creek entrance is about 2 miles (3.2 km) north on Gilroy Hot Springs Road. This entrance has no parking or facilities. Currently, it can only be used by arranging to be dropped off by car, or by parking at Hunting Hollow and walking up the road. A chemical toilet is available just beyond the locked gate and water is available at Timm Springs.

A fourth access area is the Dowdy Ranch Visitor Center, opened 19 May 2007, with access via the unpaved Kaiser-Aetna Road from Bell Station on State Route 152. This entrance is occasionally open only on summer weekends. Bikers and backpackers can access the park via this road at any time, provided they are willing to hike or ride the seven steep miles to the park boundary. When open, parking is available at Dowdy Ranch visitor center, including overnight. Visitors must leave by Sunday evening or stay until the following Saturday opening. There is excellent parking for equestrians. During the annual Coe Backcountry Weekend event in April, around 300 vehicles are permitted to travel up Kaiser Aetna road as far as the Orestimba Corral which is 5 miles beyond the Dowdy Ranch visitors center.

A future entrance is planned to be located in San Antonio Valley in the northernmost part of the park, though it will likely be many years before funds are available to do this.

Many sources of water are found within the park, including perennial springs, seasonal springs and watercourses and old ponds and lakes built by the cattle ranchers. The springs and water troughs are maintained and improved by park volunteers. All surface water in the park should be filtered before drinking to remove harmful organisms.

The state has replaced the many crude pit toilets with clean well-maintained toilet structures known by the volunteers as "Taj MaPotties". They are wheelchair-friendly, but the trails to them are not.

== Recreation ==
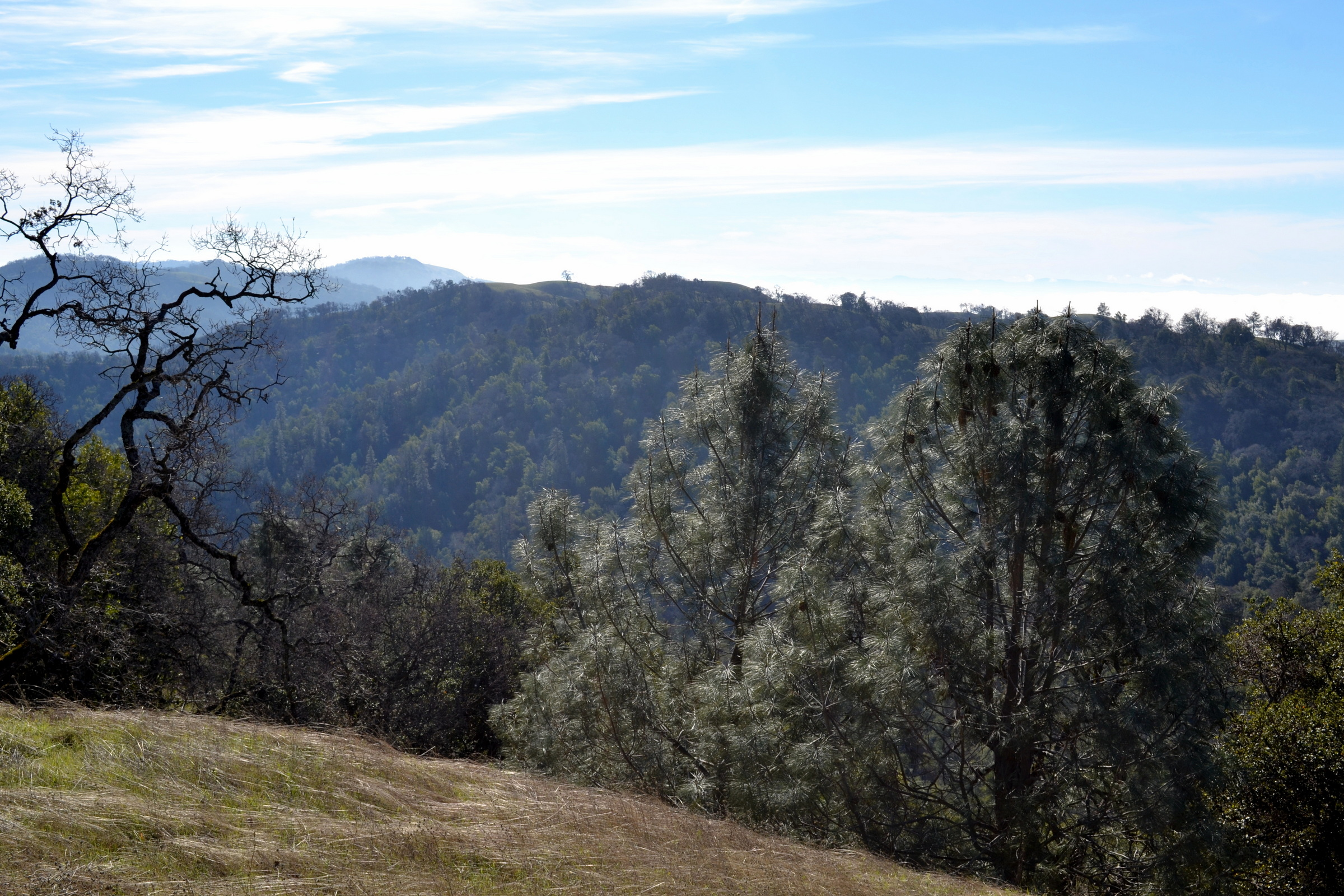
A view in the western side of the park, the part closer to Morgan Hill.

Most visitors at Coe Park hike or mountain bike on the numerous trails within the park. There are about 200 miles (320 km) of dirt roads and trails in the park. Some of the dirt roads are wide and designed well, some are narrow and rutted, and some are so overgrown as to be easily missed. Recently constructed single-track trails are usually maintained, and, in general, the closer one is to Coe Headquarters, the more such trails there are. More remote trails are often just old jeep roads overgrown to a single-track width; others were created solely by repeated use, especially by equestrians. These were often made with insufficient forethought and often suffer moderate to severe erosion problems, or may be overgrown and difficult to follow much of the year.

Henry Coe also provides exceptional backpacking opportunities. The park is so large and there are so many roads and trails, that one could plan a route covering ten miles per day, at a different campsite each night, and go two weeks without ever using the same trail or dirt road. Coe is the only park in the San Francisco Bay Area where this is possible. Backpackers also have the opportunity to fish while in the park as several of the lakes support large populations of largemouth bass and bluegill. Mississippi Lake, Coit Lake, and Kelly Lake are popular fishing destinations for backpackers. Permits are required, but are usually easy to obtain, except on busy spring weekends.

The park is considered mountain bike friendly from the Hunting Hollow entrance, since there are only a few miles of trails off limits to them (though this includes the whole of Orestimba Wilderness, but this is too far away for most bicyclists to reach on a day ride). It is not unusual for as much as half of park visitors on a given day to be mountain bicyclists, though this is normally closer to 30%. Equestrians also make use of the trails, including the Orestimba Wilderness area, though they account for less than 1% of all visitors. As in all state parks, hunting is prohibited, but fishing is allowed. Motorized vehicles are prohibited in the backcountry; exceptions are law enforcement, maintenance staff, and a few dirt roads are designated rights-of-way for in-holders, neighboring property owners and their guests.

Spring is the most popular time to visit the park, with its moderate weather, green hillsides dotted with colorful wildflowers, and flowing creeks. Summer is usually too hot and dry for some people to enjoy the area, though the nighttime weather is pleasant and the sky usually clear for star-gazing. Fall, from about mid-October through early November, is also a pleasant time to visit. There are also mild days between rainstorms in winter at Coe. Infrequent snowfall is light and usually persists for just a few days. On rare occasions, creeks can be frozen over in winter.

The most common danger faced by visitors is exhaustion from attempting to hike or ride too many steep trails in too little time, or with too little water or food. Additionally, there are many ticks of several different species (though Lyme disease is rare in the area), as well as a few venomous rattlesnakes.

=== Events ===
The park's non-profit cooperating association, the Pine Ridge Association, sponsors a number of popular annual events, including a Mothers' Day Breakfast, Backcountry Weekend, and the fall TarantulaFest. The latter consists of a traditional outdoor barbecue with live music and a celebration of the hairy arachnids which inhabit the park, the gentle tarantulas commonly seen in the fall there when males are wandering about looking for the burrows of females in order to mate with them.

== Threats of closure ==
Henry W. Coe State Park was one of 70 California state parks proposed for closure by July 2012 as part of a deficit reduction program. Park advocates from the San Jose and Silicon Valley area organized the Coe Park Preservation Fund and raised donations to keep the park staffed from July 2012 through June 2015. The principal donor was businessman J. Daniel McCranie.

The park was previously one of several state parks threatened with closure in 2008. After the statewide special election of May 19, 2009, in which voters turned down a package of propositions dealing with California's budget crisis, Governor Arnold Schwarzenegger proposed the temporary closure (for at least 2 years) of 220 parks, including Henry W. Coe State Park. The closures were ultimately avoided by cutting hours and maintenance system-wide.

== See also ==
- List of California state parks
