= Pacheco Creek =

Pacheco Creek may refer to several streams in California:

- Pacheco Creek (Contra Costa County), a tributary of Suisun Bay
- Pacheco Creek (San Benito County), a tributary of the Pajaro River in San Benito County and Santa Clara County
  - East Fork Pacheco Creek, a tributary stream
  - North Fork Pacheco Creek, a tributary stream
  - South Fork Pacheco Creek, a tributary stream

== See also ==
- Pacheco Reservoir, California, a reservoir formed by a dam on North Fork Pacheco Creek
