= Mustang Flat =

Diablo Range landform in California

Coordinates: 37°11′50″N 121°21′51″W

Mustang Flat is a flat in the Diablo Range in Stanislaus County, California. It lies at an elevation of 1,329 feet (405 meters) south of the South Fork Orestimba Creek, north of Mustang Peak.

== History ==
Droves of wild horses were held at Mustang Flat and Paradise Flat and driven up along route of the Long Ridge Road to Mustang Peak to be joined to the droves of the Joaquin Murrieta gang's horses moving southward along La Vereda del Monte(now County Line Road) at Mustang Peak from Valle Atravesado or Valle Hondo.
