= Cedar Creek (Pacheco Creek) =

Location
- Country: United States
- State: California
- Region: Santa Clara County, California

Physical characteristics
- Source: Confluence of Cedar Creek with Pacheco Creek
  - location: The eastern flank of Burra Burra Peak in the Diablo Range
  - coordinates: 37°06′24″N 121°21′19″W
  - elevation: 1,730 ft (530 m)
- Mouth
  - location: 6.5 mi (10 km) west of Pacheco Pass
  - coordinates: 37°01′45″N 121°19′32″W
  - elevation: 325 ft (99 m)
- Length: 6.25 m (20.5 ft)

Basin features
- Tributaries
  - right: Cañada de la Dormida

Cedar Creek is a 6.25 mi (10 km) south flowing stream which heads on the eastern flank of Burra Burra Peak in the Diablo Range, and is a tributary to Pacheco Creek, in Santa Clara County, California.

== History ==
Cedar Creek is likely named for California juniper (Juniperus californica), a small tree similar to Eastern red cedar (Juniperus virginiana) that is native to California, southern Nevada, and western Arizona.

== Watershed ==
The Cedar Creek mainstem begins at 1,730 ft (530 m) on the eastern flank of Burra Burra Peak, located about 0.4 mi (1 km) south of the Dowdy Ranch Visitor Center of Henry Coe State Park. It flows south for 2.0 mi (3 km) where it is joined on the right by its 5.5 mi (9 km) long Cañada de la Dormida tributary. (Cañada de la Dormida is Spanish for "valley of the sleeping woman".) From there it continues south where it is joined on the right by an unnamed tributary in Hageman Canyon, and from there continues south into Hurricane Canyon, after which it ends at its confluence with Pacheco Creek. This confluence is 0.67 mi (1 km) west of the Kaiser-Aetna Road exit at Bell Station on Pacheco Pass Highway (California State Route 152) and 6.5 mi (10 km) west of Pacheco Pass.

== Ecology ==
Professor Jerry Smith of San Jose State University reported that although Cedar Creek is generally intermittent in summer, it was used by steelhead trout (Oncorhynchus mykiss) at least through the 1970s.

The Santa Clara Valley Habitat Agency has identified the Cedar Creek undercrossing below Pacheco Pass Highway (California State Route 152) as a wildlife linkage enabling smaller animals to safely cross beneath this high-speed road at the border of Santa Clara County and San Benito County. A 2020 report by Pathways for Wildlife established significant wildlife usage of this 177 ft (54 m) long by 164 ft (50 m) wide bridge over Cedar Creek, and suggested modifications to improve it.

== See also ==
- Pacheco Creek
- Diablo Range

== See also ==
- Santa Clara Valley Habitat Agency home page
- Pajaro River Watershed Council
