= Chimney Gulch =

Valley and arroyo in Santa Clara, California, US

Chimney Gulch is a valley and arroyo in the Diablo Range, in Santa Clara, California. Its mouth is at an elevation of 932 feet (284 meters) at its confluence with an unnamed creek tributary to East Fork Pacheco Creek that runs westward down below Hagerman Peak to join the East Fork about an eighth of a mile below its confluence with Chimney Gulch. The head of Chimney Gulch and the source of the stream, is a pond south of the Fifield Ranch on the northeast slope of Hagerman Peak at 37°06′52″N 121°13′55″W.
