= Hagerman Peak =

Hagerman Peak may refer to

- Hagerman Peak (Diablo Range), in California
- Hagerman Peak (Elk Mountains, Colorado), in Colorado
