= Babbs Prairie =

Coordinates: 43°31′59″N 90°02′38″W

Babbs Prairie is a flat in Sauk county in the southern part of the U.S. state of Wisconsin.

Babbs Prairie was named after James W. Babb, a pioneer who settled the area in the 1840s.
