= North Fork Orestimba Creek =

Stream in Stanislaus County, California

North Fork Orestimba Creek is a tributary stream of Orestimba Creek, in the Diablo Range in Stanislaus County, California. Its mouth lies at an elevation of 673 feet (205 meters) at its confluence with South Fork Orestimba Creek where it forms the head of Orestimba Creek, itself a tributary of the San Joaquin River. Its source is at an elevation of 3,250 feet (990 meters) at 37°20′37″N 121°24′44″W on the north slope of the northern ridge of Black Mountain.
