= Orestimba Creek =

- Etymology: Spanish
- Native name: Arroyo de Orestimba (Spanish)

Location
- Country: United States
- State: California
- Region: Stanislaus County

Physical characteristics
- Source confluence
  - location: Confluence of North Fork Orestimba Creek and South Fork Orestimba Creek, Stanislaus County, California
  - coordinates: 37°18′09″N 121°17′22″W
  - elevation: 669 ft (204 m)
- Mouth
  - location: Mouth at the San Joaquin River, 7.3 miles north of Newman, in Stanislaus County
  - coordinates: 37°25′19″N 121°00′12″W
  - elevation: 46 ft (14 m)

Basin features
- River system: San Joaquin River
- Tributaries
  - left: North Fork Orestimba Creek, Oso Creek, Crow Creek
  - right: South Fork Orestimba Creek

Orestimba Creek, originally Arroyo de Orestimba (Orestimba, a Yokutsan word for "meeting place") is a tributary of the San Joaquin River draining eastern slopes of part of the Diablo Range within the San Joaquin Valley of California.

== History ==
The Orestimba name derives from the Ohlone language ores meaning bear. It is first mentioned as Arroyo de Orestimac in the historic record in Padre José Viader's exploration diary of 1810. He was the long-serving head of Mission Santa Clara de Asis. Arroyo Orestimba was a watering place on El Camino Viejo in the San Joaquin Valley and was the primary water source for Rancho Orestimba y Las Garzas near its northern boundary. The ranch house of Rancho Orestimba y las Garzas, was built above the sycamore grove on Arroyo de Orestimba.

In 1981 the Mustang-Gill Ranch, which included much of the South Fork Orestimba Creek watershed in southwest Stanislaus County, was acquired by California State Parks and became part of Henry W. Coe State Park. The Park's General Plan, approved in 1985, designated the 22,000 acres (89 km^{2}) of the Park as the Orestimba Wilderness.

In 1998 the Simon Newman Ranch was acquired by The Nature Conservancy which continues to manage its 33,000 acres (130 km^{2}) which include the eastern Diablo Range foothills watersheds of both Orestimba Creek and Garzas Creek.

== Watershed and Course ==
The Orestimba Creek watershed drains 141 square miles (370 km^{2}) and is the largest of the 13 tributaries of the San Joaquin River's westside basin.

The Orestimba Creek mainstem has its source at the confluence of the North Fork and South Fork of Orestimba Creek (elevation 673 feet (205 m)) and flows northeast 27.0 miles (43.5 km) to its mouth at the San Joaquin River 7.3 miles (11.7 km) north of Newman in Stanislaus County. Its two major tributaries each begin just west of the Diablo Range Crest just inside Stanislaus County's border with Santa Clara County. North Fork Orestimba Creek begins at elevation 3,083 feet (940 m) about 1.1 miles (1.8 km) north-by-northwest of Black Mountain and the much longer and lower gradient South Fork Orestimba Creek begins at elevation 1,462 feet (446 m).

After the confluence of the North and South Forks, mainstem Orestimba Creek receives only two named tributaries (from the left heading downstream): Oso Creek in the mountains and Crow Creek on the Central Valley floor. North Fork Orestimba Creek receives no named tributaries. However, South Fork Orestimba Creek receives several named tributaries, all beginning just west of the Diablo Range Crest and joining from the left: first Hartman Creek, then Red Creek, then Robison Creek, and then Sheep Thief Creek.

== Ecology ==
The Orestimba Creek watershed is dominated by blue oak (Quercus douglasii) and gray pine (Pinus sabiniana) with patches of riparian, chaparral and grasslands habitats. Native mammal species include black-tailed jackrabbit (Lepus californicus), brush rabbit (Sylvilagus bachmani), California ground squirrel (Otospermophilus beecheyi), coyote (Canis latrans), grey fox (Urocyon cinereoargenteus), striped skunk (Mephitis mephitis), bobcat (Lynx rufus), puma (Puma concolor) and Columbian black-tailed deer (Odocoileus hemionus columbianus). Historically pronghorn (Antilocapra americana) and tule elk (Cervus canadensis nannodes) were present, with tule elk now present after translocations to Mount Hamilton circa 1980.

== Recreation ==
Upper South Fork Orestimba Creek and its Hartman Creek, Red Creek and Robison Creek subtributaries are included in a designated wilderness area of about 22,000 acres (8,900 ha) in a northern section of Henry W. Coe State Park known as the "Orestimba Wilderness".
