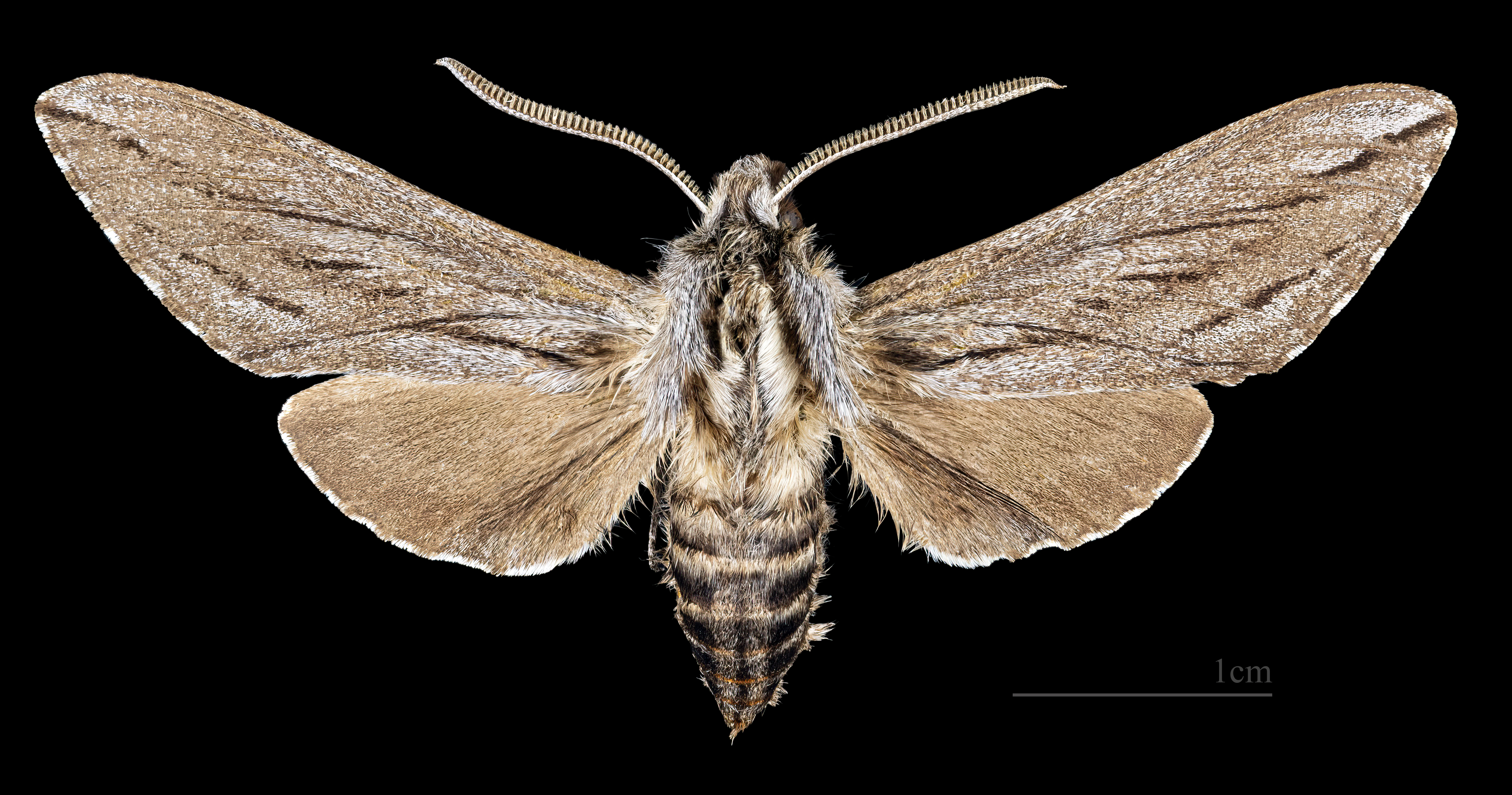
- Sphinx sequoiae ♂
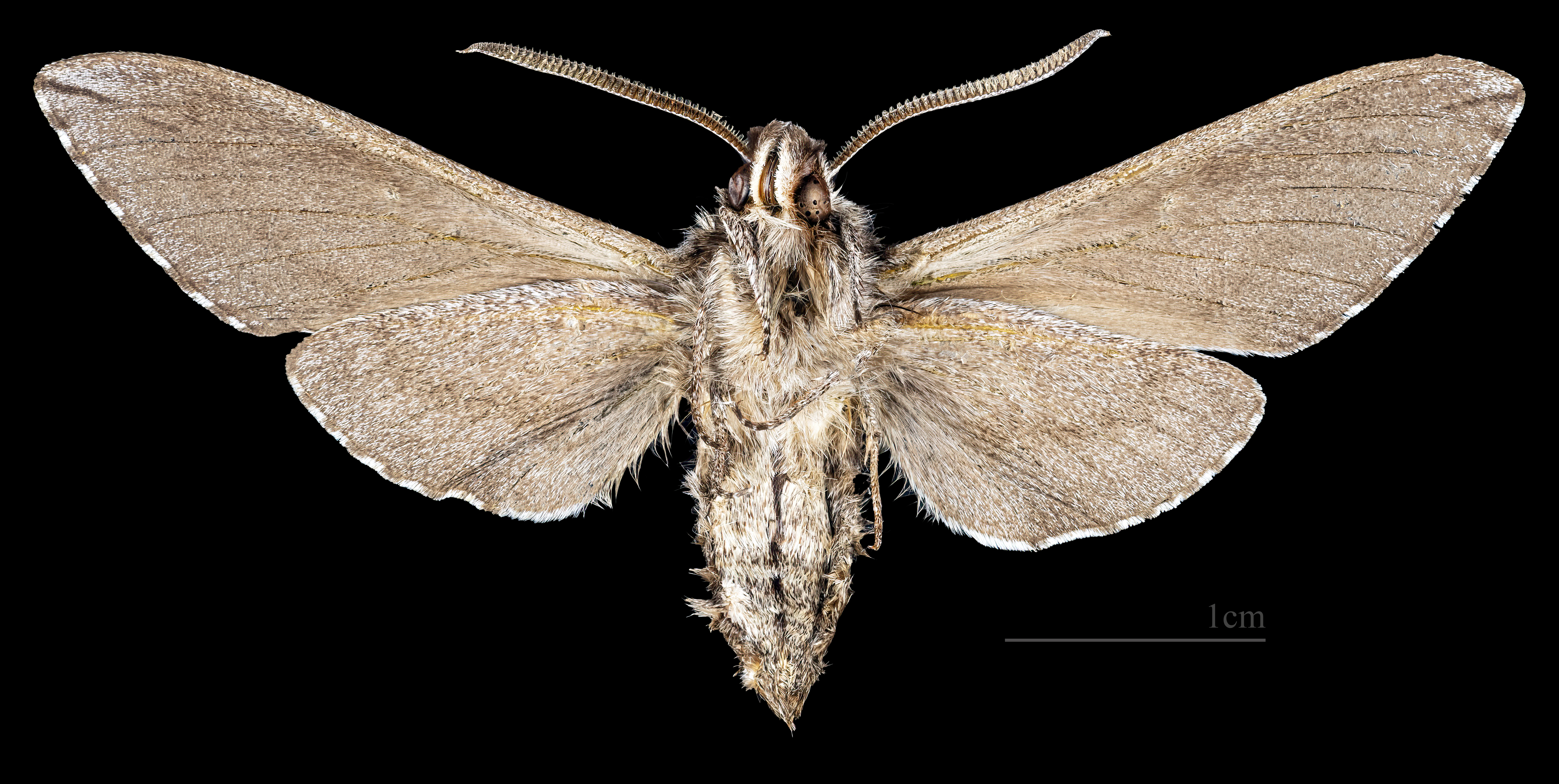
- Sphinx sequoiae ♂ △

Scientific classification
- Kingdom: Animalia
- Phylum: Arthropoda
- Class: Insecta
- Order: Lepidoptera
- Family: Sphingidae
- Genus: Sphinx
- Species: S. sequoiae

Binomial name
- Sphinx sequoiae Boisduval, 1868

Synonyms
- Sphinx dollii engelhardti Clark, 1919

= Sphinx sequoiae =

Sequoia sphinx

Species of moth

Sphinx sequoiae, the sequoia sphinx, is a moth of the family Sphingidae. It is found in the United States from Oregon south through California, Nevada, and south-eastern Utah to Arizona and further south into Mexico's northern Baja California. It is particularly common in juniper and cedar forests, like those east of the Cascade Range in the Pacific Northwest.

The species was first identified by Jean Baptiste Boisduval in 1868.

== Description ==
The wingspan of the sequoia sphinx is 48–68 mm, with a forewing length of 24–26 mm. This makes it the smallest species of its genus other than Sphinx dollii, for which it is sometimes confused though they inhabit different regions. It has ash-gray, pointed forewings with several horizontal black dashes; its hindwings are a monotone ash-gray. The thorax and abdomen are likewise gray, and it has a white-and-brown checkered fringe. There is a single generation of adult moths per year which flies between May and August. Adults are nocturnal, and are attracted to light. They feed on nectar from the flowers of western chokecherry (Prunus virginiana) and California buckeye (Aesculus californica).

The larvae are green with white, red-brown, and yellow-brown spots; they have a caudal horn that is short, blunt, and yellow-tipped, and white, black-rimmed spiracles. They are hosted by the California juniper (Juniperus californica), Utah juniper (Juniperus osteosperma), and California incense cedar (Calocedrus decurrens). Sphinx sequoiae eggs are roughly 2 mm in length and width, and have a light, bluish-green colour.

== See also ==
- Sphinx (genus)
- Sphingidae
- List of Sphingidae species
