= Pacheco Creek (San Benito County) =

Pacheco Creek Arroyo de San Felipe
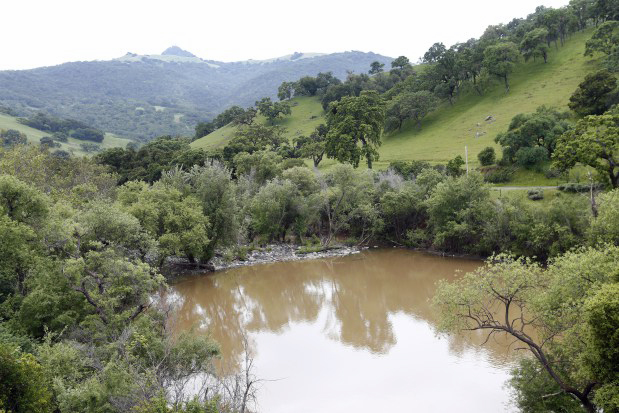
- North Fork Pacheco Creek Dam just north of Highway 152, facing south, courtesy of Gary Reyes

Location
- Country: United States
- State: California
- Region: San Benito and Santa Clara Counties,

Physical characteristics
- Source: Confluence of North Fork Pacheco Creek and South Fork Pacheco Creek
  - location: Just south of Pacheco Reservoir, Santa Clara County
  - coordinates: 37°02′42″N 121°17′23″W
  - elevation: 431 ft (131 m)
- Mouth: San Felipe Lake, the source of the Pajaro River
  - location: 5 mi (8 km) east of Gilroy
  - coordinates: 36°58′38″N 121°27′37″W
  - elevation: 144 ft (44 m)

Basin features
- Tributaries
  - left: South Fork Pacheco Creek, Tequisquita Slough
  - right: North Fork Pacheco Creek, Cedar Creek, Elephant Head Creek

Pacheco Creek is a 28 miles (45 km) west by southwest flowing stream which heads in the Diablo Range in southeastern Santa Clara County and flows to San Felipe Lake, the beginning of the Pajaro River mainstem, in San Benito County, California.

== History ==
The creek is named for Francisco Pacheco and Juan P. Pacheco who were granted the Rancho Ausaymas y San Felipe land grants in 1833 and 1836, and 1843 respectively. An early name for the creek was Arroyo de San Felipe. Francisco Pacheco came to California in 1819.

Just north of the earthen dam on North Fork Pacheco Creek was one of the last refuges of the Amah Mutsun band of the Ohlone people, and is rich archeologically with multiple burial sites and artifacts, including projective points so large that they would have been used for bear or elk. In 1993, Mark Hylkema documented eight different Native American sites in this area, dating from 1000 B.C. to 500 A.D.

=== Flooding ===
On 11 January 2017, a levee break at Pacheco Creek affected fifty local homes; some homes had mudlines about five feet high. On 12 January, health officials advised some local residents not to drink local tapwater pending contamination testing.

== Watershed ==
The mainstem Pacheco Creek is formed by the confluence of the North Fork Pacheco Creek and South Fork Pacheco Creek about 7 miles (11 km) west of Pacheco Pass. Significant flows are contributed to the Pacheco Creek mainstem by the North and South Forks of Pacheco Creek, and Cedar Creek.

The North Fork Pacheco Creek tributary is a 19 miles (31 km) stream beginning in Henry W. Coe State Park at 2,360 feet (720 m) and receives the 6 miles (9.7 km) East Fork Pacheco Creek, at Chimney Rock before reaching Pacheco Reservoir, the latter just north of Highway 152 and 0.4 miles (0.64 km) above the confluence of North and South Forks Pacheco Creek. The Mississippi Creek tributary of North Fork Pacheco Creek is 9.5 miles (15.3 km) has an impoundment (Mississippi Lake) above 2,100 feet (640 m) elevation, and sources on Bear Mountain on the northern side of Henry W. Coe State Park.

The South Fork Pacheco Creek tributary receives flows from the shorter Middle Fork Pacheco Creek just below Highway 152. From here the South Fork Pacheco Creek flows 0.6 miles (0.97 km) to it confluence with North Fork Pacheco Creek, forming the source of the Pacheco Creek mainstem. From here Pacheco Creek generally follows Highway 152, passing from Santa Clara County to San Benito County, and continuing until it empties into San Felipe (Soap) Lake, the source of the Pajaro River.

Tequisquita Slough joins Pacheco Creek just above San Felipe Lake. The latter has 3 main tributaries, Santa Ana Creek, Arroyo de Los Viboras, and Arroyo Dos Pichachos. Santa Ana Creek is apparently named for the Rancho Santa Ana y Quien Sabe land grant.

Stream flow in Pacheco Creek is influenced by releases from the North Fork Pacheco Reservoir, which is operated by the Pacheco Pass Water District.

== Ecology ==
Significant remnants of the historic riparian California sycamore (Platanus racemosa) habitat still exists on Pacheco Creek and these stands are one of the largest and highest quality Central Coast Sycamore Alluvial Woodland (CCSAW) habitat type remaining in the state. California sycamore stands are a CDFW-designated sensitive natural community and are vulnerable to dams which temper flood events. Sycamore alluvial woodlands require natural flooding and channel-forming flows and scour that historically characterized many of the creeks in the foothills of the watershed. Pacheco Creek's Central Coast California sycamore woodlands stretch from Bell Station to the Hollister plain and represent almost 7% of the total remaining in the state.

Pacheco Creek historically hosted steelhead trout (Oncorhynchus mykiss) as evidenced by a physical specimen collected in 1945 by D.H. Simpson in the California Academy of Sciences, "19.5 miles east of Gilroy on Hwy. 152". Cedar Creek and South Fork Pacheco Creek hosted steelhead trout runs in wet years and juveniles found on stream sampling indicated the presence of perennial pools suitable for oversummering in headwater reaches. Pacheco Reservoir (North Fork Dam) is an impassable barrier to in-migrating steelhead trout, preventing access to the nearly 34.5 miles (55.5 km) of stream consisting of North Fork Pacheco Creek, Mississippi Creek and East Fork Pacheco Creek. In 1973 Fish and Game Warden W. I. Donahue reported that "high quality spawning and rearing habitat with perennial flow occurred upstream from Pacheco Dam on the North Fork, but was unavailable to steelhead because of the dam." In addition, resident rainbow (the landlocked form of steelhead trout) successfully rear in fast-water habitats grow rapidly and reach smolt size by the end of their first summer. In many years in late spring, prior to reservoir releases for agriculture, low stream flows and high water temperatures severely impact steelhead fry and small juveniles.

Other native fish in Pacheco Creek include Monterey sucker (Catostomus occidentalis mniotiltus) and Sacramento pikeminnow (Ptychocheilus grandis).

The Santa Clara Valley Habitat Agency (SCVHA) has identified the Pacheco Creek undercrossing below Pacheco Pass Highway (California State Route 152) as a key wildlife linkage to enable smaller animals to safely cross beneath this high-speed road at the border of Santa Clara County and San Benito County. A 2020 report by Pathways for Wildlife established significant wildlife usage of this 220 ft (67 m) long by 177 ft (54 m) wide bridge over Cedar Creek, and suggested modifications to improve it. The SCVHA has protected 162 acres (0.7 km^{2}) along the creek as the Pacheco Creek Habitat Preserve at this location.

== See also ==
- Rivers of California
  - Pacheco Creek (San Benito County), a tributary of the Pajaro River, in San Benito County, California.
    - South Fork Pacheco Creek, a tributary stream of Pacheco Creek (San Benito County)
    - East Fork Pacheco Creek, a tributary stream of Pacheco Creek (San Benito County)
    - North Fork Pacheco Creek, a tributary stream of Pacheco Creek (San Benito County)
    - Pacheco Reservoir, California, a reservoir formed by a dam on the north fork of Pacheco Creek (San Benito County) a.k.a. "North Fork Dam"
