= Rooster Comb =

Highest point
- Elevation: 1,836 ft (560 m) NGVD 29
- Coordinates: 37°14′36″N 121°21′28″W

Geography
- Location: Orestimba Wilderness; Stanislaus County, CA, U.S.
- Parent range: Diablo Range
- Topo map: USGS Mustang Peak

Rooster Comb is a prominent ridge located in Henry W. Coe State Park, east of Morgan Hill, California and in Stanislaus County. Its name refers to the large fleshy red skin atop a rooster's head. The resemblance to a rooster's comb is evident by the large rock formations running the length of the ridge, separating it from the grassy slopes below. This contrast gives the illusion of a rooster's comb.
