= Mississippi Creek =

River in California, United States

Mississippi Creek is a tributary stream to Pacheco Creek in Santa Clara County, California.

Its mouth is located at an elevation of 866 feet (264 meters) at its confluence with the North Fork Pacheco Creek. Its source is located at 37°13′39″N 121°26′20″W on the south flank of Bear Mountain in the Diablo Range in Santa Clara County.

The upper part of the creek, at the Valle Atravesado was subsequently flooded when Mississippi Creek, that runs southward through it, was dammed in the 20th century on the valleys south side. It is now a reservoir, originally named Murray Lake, on the upper reach of Mississippi Creek. The lake was originally named after its builder Murray Hopkins who not only built the reservoir, but the 40 miles of County Line Road along the crest of the Diablo Range between San Antonio Valley and Fifield Ranch. Today the reservoir is called Mississippi Lake and the dam Mississippi Dam.
