= Mississippi Lake (Santa Clara County, California) =

- Location within California
- Location: Santa Clara County, California
- Coordinates: 37°11′51″N 121°25′06″W
- Type: Reservoir

Mississippi Lake is reservoir on Mississippi Creek within Henry W. Coe State Park in Santa Clara County, California. It is also the largest reservoir in the park.

== History ==
Mississippi Lake was created when the valley of Mississippi Creek, that runs southward through the Diablo Range, was dammed in the 20th century on the south side of Valle Atravesado and is now a reservoir. This reservoir was originally named Murray Lake, named after its builder Murray Hopkins, who not only built the reservoir but the 59 miles of County Line Road along the divide of the Diablo Range between San Antonio Valley and Fifield Ranch.

== Current status ==
Mississippi Lake has camping around the lake and bass fishing. Vault toilets are at the south and northwest ends of the lake.
