= Pacheco Reservoir =

Pacheco Lake
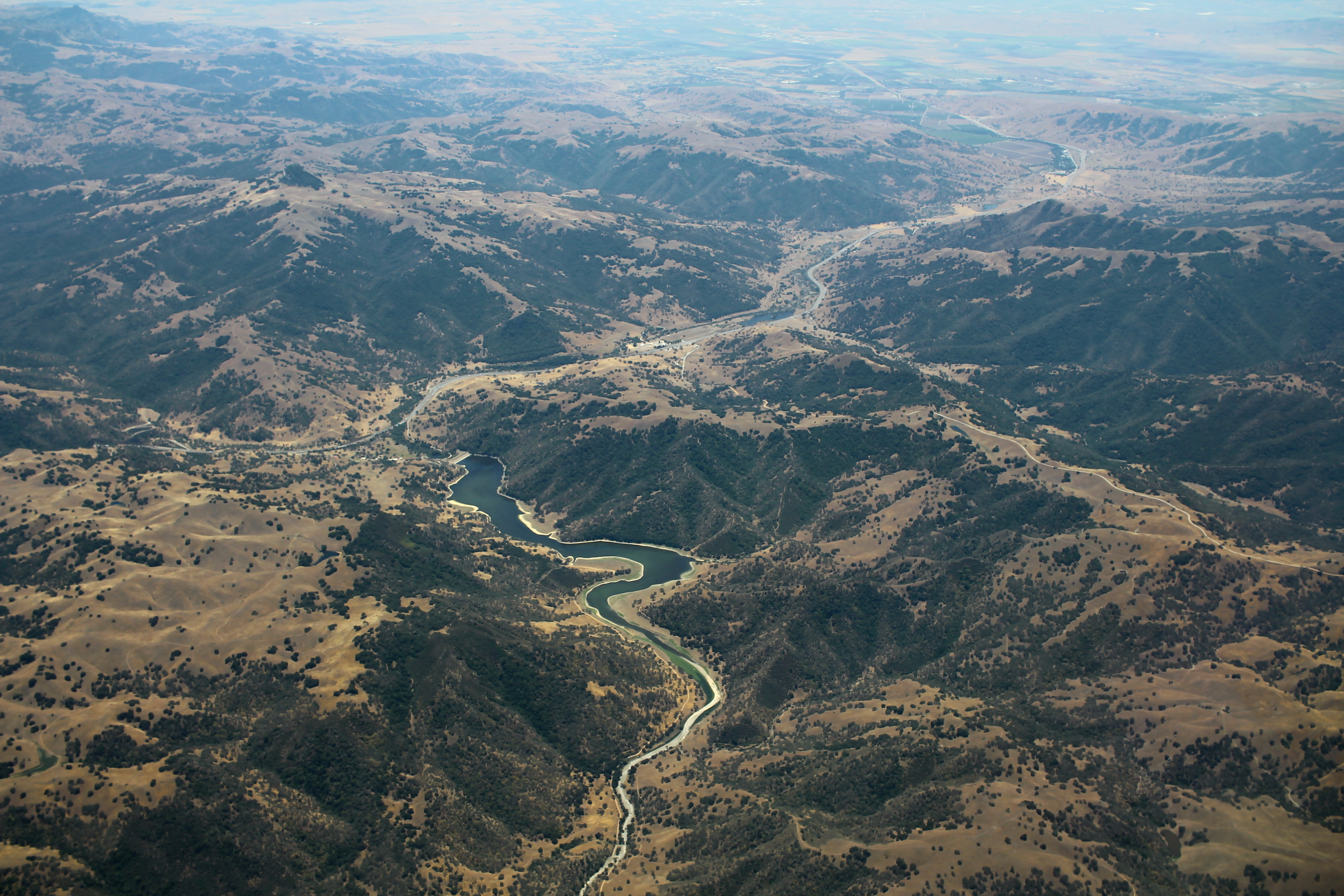
- Aerial view of Pacheco Reservoir

- Location within California Location within the United States
- Location: Diablo Range, eastern Santa Clara County, California
- Coordinates: 37°03′41″N 121°17′41″W
- Type: Reservoir
- Primary outflows: North Fork Pacheco Creek
- Catchment area: 67.2 sq mi (174 km^{2})
- Basin countries: United States
- Max. length: 2 miles (3.2 km)
- Max. width: 1,500 feet (460 m)
- Surface area: 197 acres (80 ha)
- Water volume: 6,150 acre-feet (7,590,000 m^{3})
- Surface elevation: 476 feet (145 m)

Pacheco Reservoir is a man-made reservoir in the Diablo Range in California, U.S.A. The lake is formed by a dam on the north fork of Pacheco Creek, whose waters reach Monterey Bay by way of the Pajaro River. The Pacheco Pass Water District is currently responsible for operation and maintenance of the Pacheco Reservoir. Located north of State Route 152 in eastern Santa Clara County, the lake is about an hour's drive from downtown San Jose.

== North Fork Dam ==
North Fork Dam
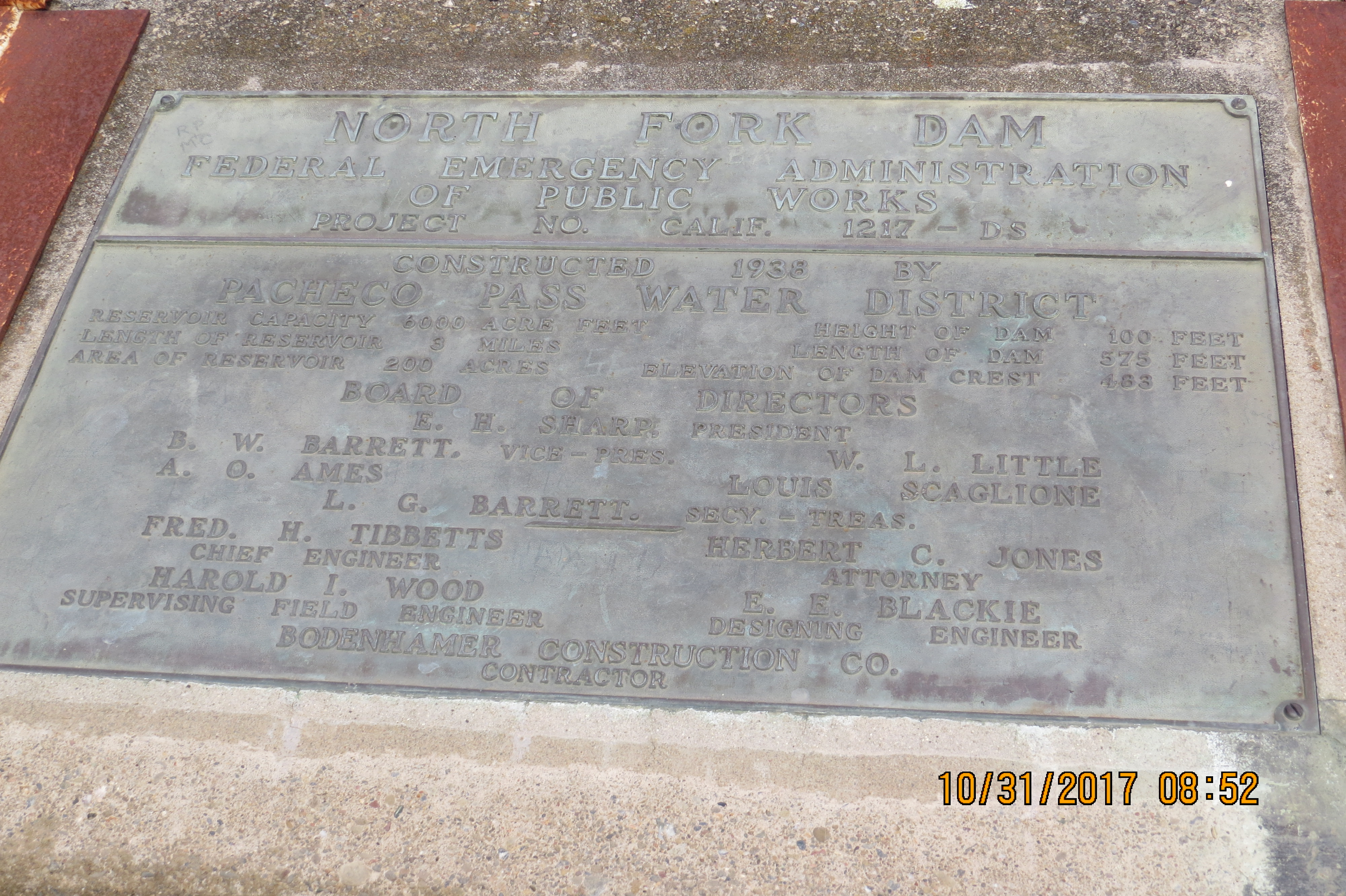
- Plaque atop the North Fork Dam at Pacheco Reservoir
- Interactive map of North Fork Dam
- Country: United States
- Location: Santa Clara County, California
- Coordinates: 37°3′1″N 121°17′29″W
- Opening date: 1939; 87 years ago
- Owner: Pacheco Pass Water District

Dam and spillways
- Type of dam: Earthen
- Impounds: Pacheco Creek
- Height: 100 feet (30 m)
- Length: 600 feet (180 m)
- Elevation at crest: 483 feet (147 m)
- Width (crest): 20 feet (6.1 m)
- Dam volume: 325,000 cubic yards (248,000 m^{3})

Reservoir
- Creates: Pacheco Lake
- Total capacity: 6,150 acre-feet (7,590,000 m^{3})
- Catchment area: 67.2 square miles (174 km^{2})
- Surface area: 197 acres (80 ha)
- Maximum length: 2 miles (3.2 km)
- Maximum width: 1,500 feet (460 m)
- Normal elevation: 476 feet (145 m)

The lake's waters are impounded by the North Fork Dam, an earthen dam built in 1939. The dam is 100 feet (30 m) high and 600 feet (180 m) long and contains 325,000 cubic yards (248,000 m^{3}) of material. Its crest is 483 feet (147 m) above mean sea level. The North Fork Dam has for years been considered a "high-hazard dam in poor condition".

The reservoir dam is an impassable barrier to in-migrating steelhead trout (Oncorhynchus mykiss), preventing access to the nearly 34.5 miles (55.5 km) of stream consisting of North Fork Pacheco Creek, Mississippi Creek and East Fork Pacheco Creek. Resident rainbow trout (the landlocked form of steelhead) successfully rear in fast-water habitats above the dam. They grow rapidly and reach smolt size by the end of their first summer. In many years in late spring, prior to reservoir releases for agriculture, low stream flows and high-water temperatures severely impact steelhead fry and small juveniles.

== Pacheco Reservoir Expansion Project ==
In 2017, Santa Clara Valley Water District's (known as “Valley Water”) initial cost estimate for the expanded Pacheco Reservoir footprint was roughly $969 million. In 2018, the Pacheco Pass Water District, and San Benito County Water District were awarded $484.5 million from California’s Water Quality, Supply and Infrastructure Improvement Act of 2014, to expand Pacheco Reservoir from its capacity of 5,500 Acre-foot to 140,000 acre-feet. In order to remain eligible for Proposition 1 funding, an estimated 75% of funding must be derived from non-state funding.

In 2019, Valley Water increased the project's estimated cost to approximately $1.3 billion. The new dam project involves building an earthen dam made of rock and soil upstream of the existing dam, a pump station, a pipeline, roads, miles of transmission lines and other related infrastructure. In 2020, due to a new design study, the total cost of the project rose to $2.5 billion, or about $18,000 per acre-foot. Valley Water has also been invited to apply for a federal Water Infrastructure Finance and Innovation Act loan of $1.2 billion. The loan amount would be paid for by ratepayers.

Pacheco Creek's natural annual inflow volume is less than 50-acre feet in drier years. Therefore, the new reservoir would rely heavily on imported water from the Sacramento-San Joaquin Delta and San Luis Reservoir, which is located to the east of Highway 152 and is part of the Central Valley Project (CVP) San Felipe Division in Merced and Santa Clara counties. The imported water would be supplied by the United States Bureau of Reclamation under contract to Valley Water and the San Benito County Water District. The filling of the new Pacheco Reservoir would be subject to the same limitations as its other Delta water imports. At peak capacity, the reservoir could hold 140,000 acre-feet, but only about 3,600 acre-feet would be available for Valley Water in an average year. In an average year, about 4,864 acre-feet of water would evaporate from the reservoir.

Valley Water is currently exploring the project design and evaluating environmental impacts. Valley Water published the Draft Environmental Impact Report on November 17, 2021, and the public comment period ended on February 15, 2022. During the April 18, 2022 Valley Water Capital Improvement Program Committee Meeting, staff indicated that Valley Water had received roughly 180 public comments, many from state and federal agencies. Several comments from state and federal agencies identify deficiencies in the draft environmental impact report. California Department of Fish and Wildlife commented that as a whole the draft report “lacks sufficient information for CDFW to fully assess the magnitude of the Proposed Project’s environmental impacts and which mitigation measure may be necessary.” Additionally, CDFW had concerns regarding changes in flow regimes, impacts to steelhead, improper water temperature analysis, harmful algal blooms and several others.

Valley Water is required to obtain Division of Safety of Dams (DSOD) approval for any dam constructed within the state. The DSOD commented that it had written a letter on November 1, 2021, rejecting the hardfill dam included in the proposed project due to significant uncertainties and risks to public safety. As of May 31, 2022, Valley Water has not indicated a new proposed project that may meet DSOD requirements.

Valley Water anticipates the completion of design, permit approvals, and environmental document to be completed in 2024 and construction to begin in 2025. However, the California State Water Resources Control Board's comment letter on the draft environmental impact report describes the water permits and approvals needed for the project. Calling into question Valley Water's timeline, the board's comment indicates that the water rights approval process may take several years to complete.

Several federal government agencies also provided comments on the draft report. National Marine Fisheries Service's (NMFS) commented on the lack of clarity between the potential for conflicts between project objectives, providing water reliability and increasing suitable steelhead habitat. NMFS as well as CDFW commented on the lack of analysis of construction impacts to steelhead over a 6-year plus construction period.

At a January 14, 2022 meeting, Valley Water staff provided context and answered questions regarding the draft report. During the meeting a member of the public asked when Valley Water would begin the National Environmental Policy Act (NEPA) process. At that time, Valley Water staff stated that it is working with the United States Bureau of Reclamation, which would be the lead federal agency for the NEPA process. As of May 31, 2022, a Notice of Intent to begin the NEPA process had not been published. Additionally, the United States Environmental Protection Agency (EPA) commented that in an effort to avoid redundancy, improve efficiency, and interagency cooperation Valley Water should synchronize the NEPA and CEQA processes. In March 2022, Valley Water asked EPA to be the NEPA lead agency for the dam.

== See also ==
- List of dams and reservoirs in California
- List of lakes in California
- List of lakes in the San Francisco Bay Area
