= South Fork Orestimba Creek =

South Fork Orestimba Creek is a tributary stream of Orestimba Creek, in the Diablo Range in Stanislaus County, California. Its mouth lies at an elevation of 673 feet (205 meters) at its confluence with North Fork Orestimba Creek where it forms the head of Orestimba Creek, itself a tributary of the San Joaquin River. Its source is at an elevation of 1,550 feet (470 meters) at 37°09′26″N 121°23′06″W in Henry W. Coe State Park.
