= Mustang Peak (Stanislaus County, California) =

Mountain in California, United States

Coordinates: 37°11′07″N 121°21′39″W

Mustang Peak is a mountain summit along the divide of the Diablo Range in Stanislaus County, California. It rises to an elevation of 2,251 / 686 meters.

== History ==
Mustang Peak is where the wild or stolen horses belonging to Joaquin Murrieta's, gang held at Paradise Flat or Mustang Flat, were driven up what is now Long Ridge Road to La Vereda del Monte, (now County Line Road) on the north side of that peak, and fed into a passing drove of the gangs horses being driven south to Sonora.
