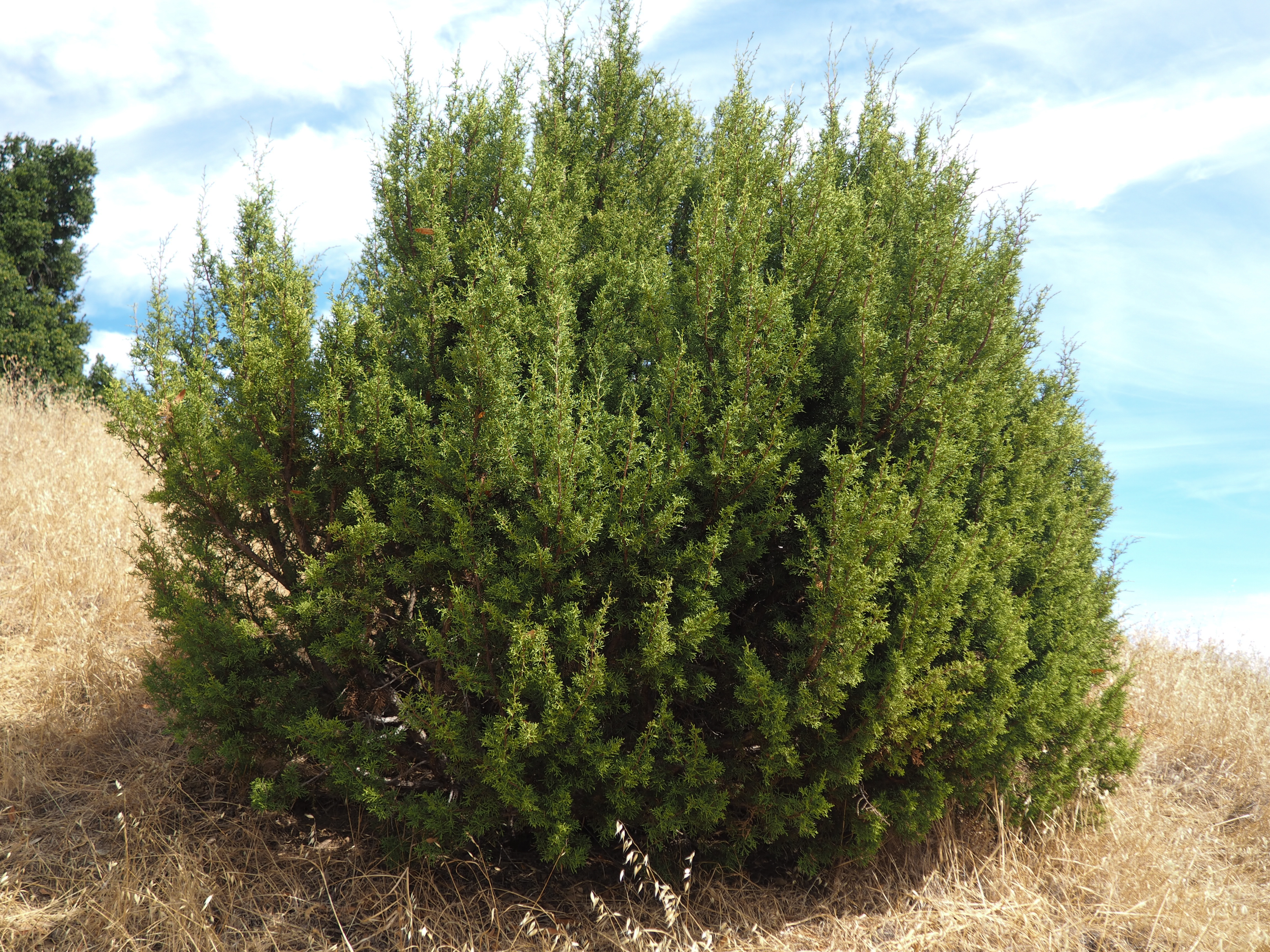
- J. californica on Mount Diablo

Conservation status
- Least Concern (IUCN 3.1)

- Apparently Secure (NatureServe)

Scientific classification
- Kingdom: Plantae
- Clade: Tracheophytes
- Clade: Gymnosperms
- Division: Pinophyta
- Class: Pinopsida
- Order: Cupressales
- Family: Cupressaceae
- Genus: Juniperus
- Section: Juniperus sect. Sabina
- Species: J. californica

Binomial name
- Juniperus californica Carrière
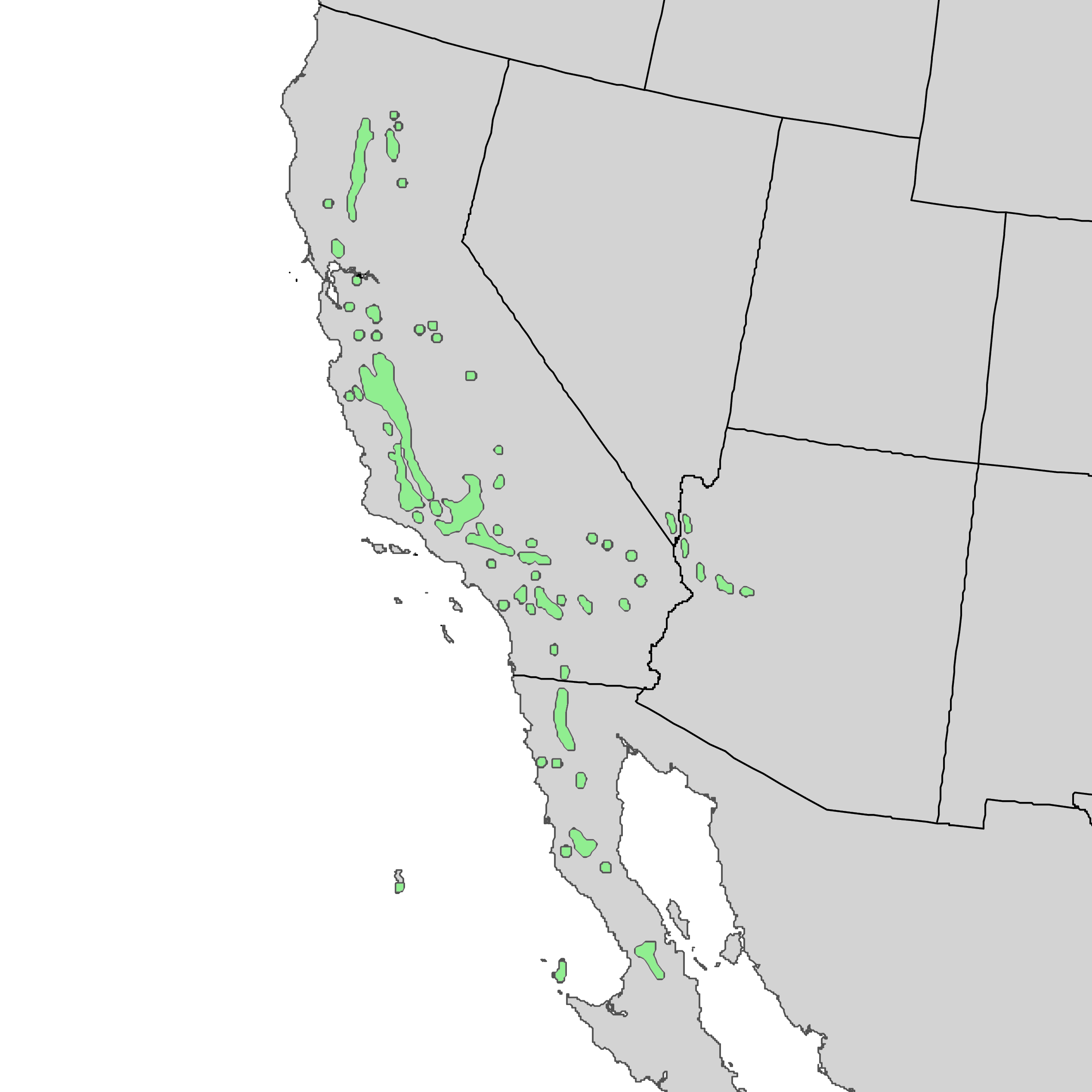
- Natural range of Juniperus californica

= Juniperus californica =

California juniper

Species of conifer

Juniperus californica, the California juniper, is a species of juniper native to southwestern North America.

== Description ==
Juniperus californica is a multi-stemmed shrub or small tree with a rounded crown, reaching 3–8 meters (10–26 feet), but rarely up to 10 m (33 ft) tall. The bark is gray, exfoliates in thin strips, but is smooth on smaller branchlets. The shoots are fairly thick compared to most junipers, between 1.5 and 2 millimeters (1/16 and 3/32 inch) in diameter.

The foliage is bluish-gray and scale-like. The juvenile leaves (on the seedlings) are needle-like and 5 to 10 mm (3/16 to 3/8 in) long. Arranged in opposite decussate pairs or whorls of three, the adult leaves are scale-like, 1 to 5 mm (1/16 to 3/16 in) long on lead shoots and 1 to 1.5 mm (1/32 to 1/16 in) broad.

The cones are berrylike, 7 to 13 mm (1/4 to 1/2 in) in diameter, blue-brown with a whitish waxy bloom, turning reddish-brown, and contain a single seed (rarely two or three). The seeds are mature in about 8 or 9 months. The male cones are 2 to 4 mm (1/16 to 3/16 in) long and shed their pollen in early spring. This juniper is largely dioecious, producing cones of only one sex, but around 2% of plants are monoecious, with both sexes on the same plant.

The California juniper can be distinguished from the western juniper by having 1-2 seeds per seed cone rather than 2-3, cones maturing in one year and having a multi-stemmed habit vs a single-stemmed tree. Compared to Utah juniper (J.osteosperma) J. californica is dioecious and has conspicuous abaxial glands while J. osteosperma is monoecious and has inconspicuous, embedded glands.

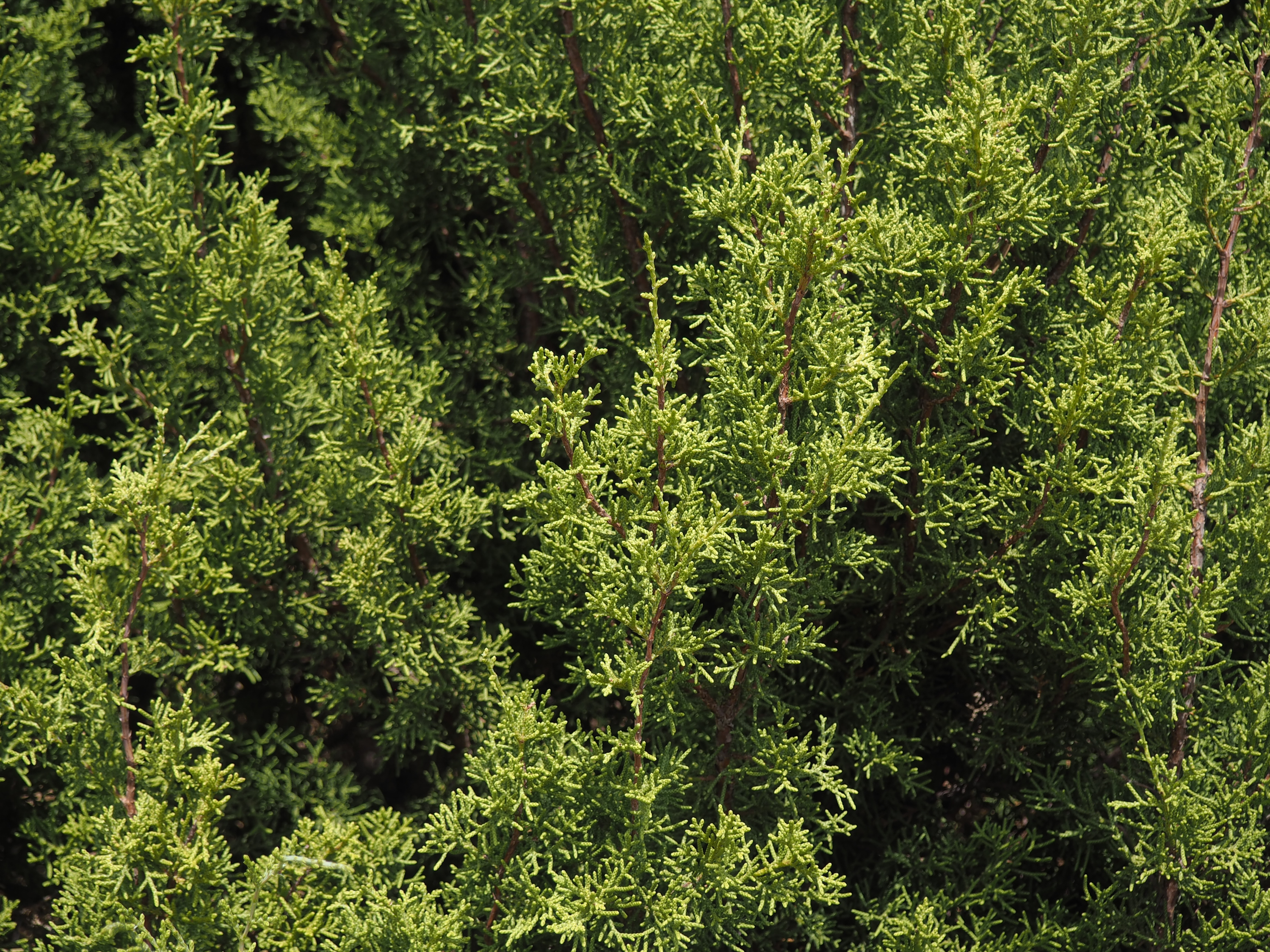
Detail of foliage

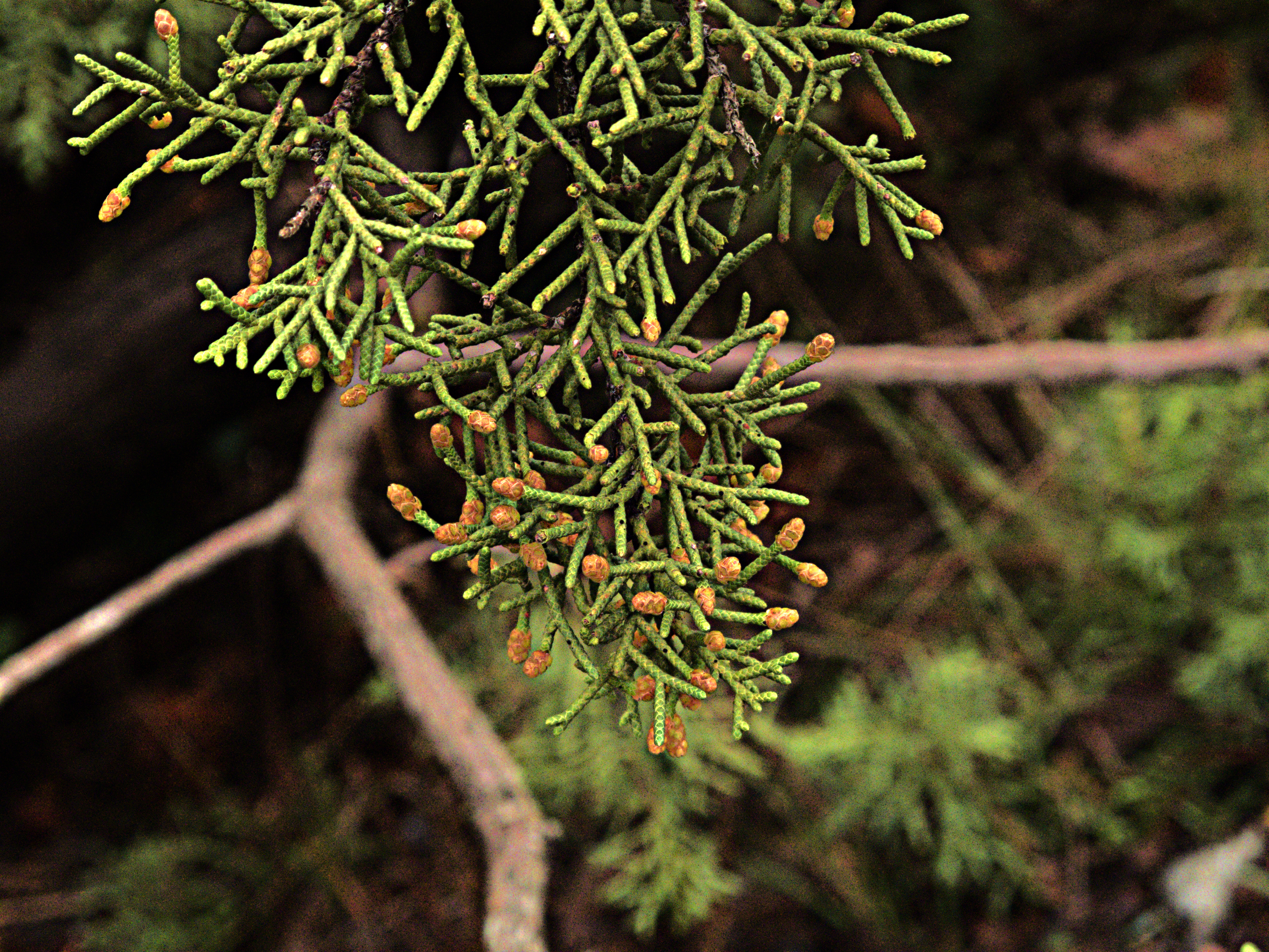
Male pollen cones

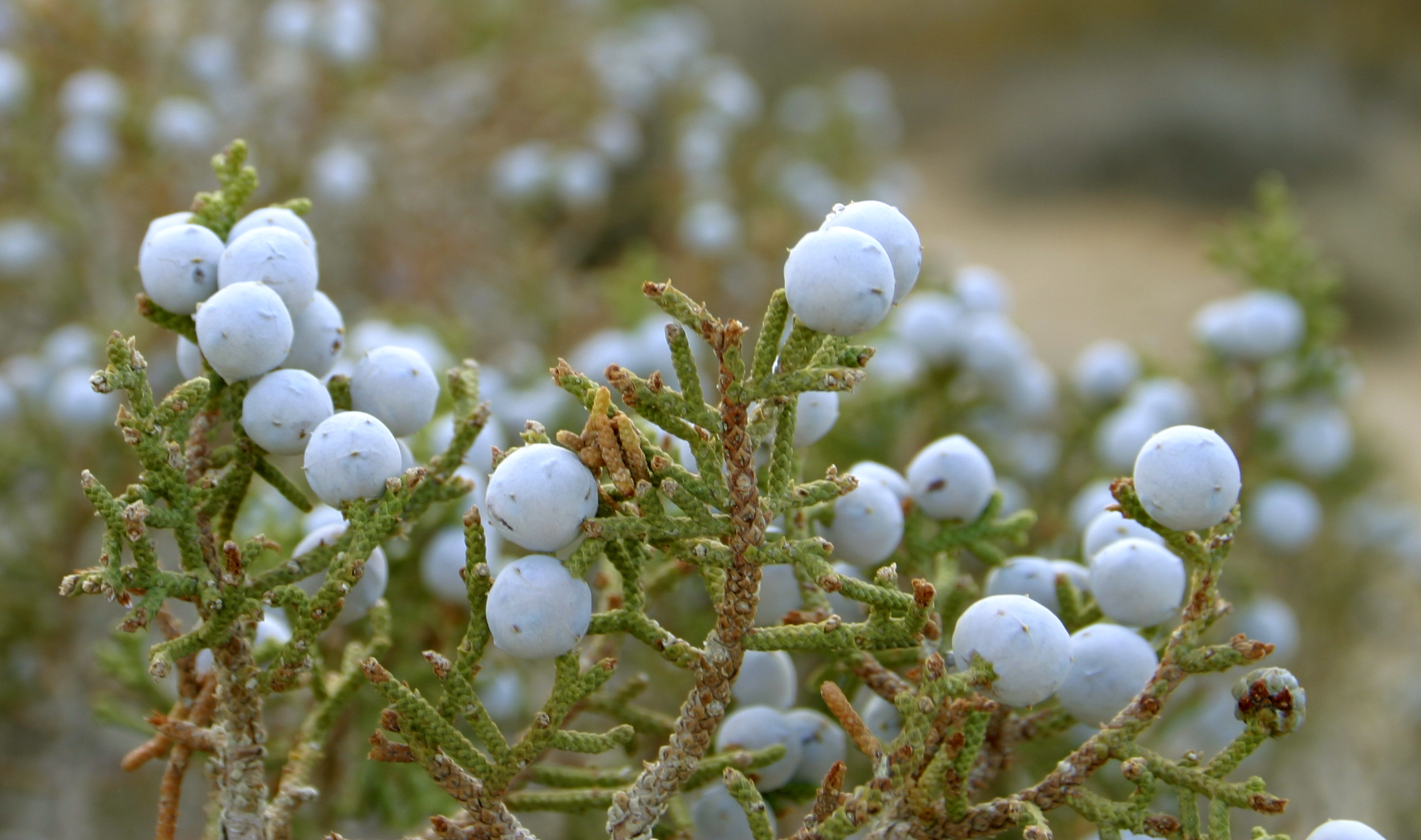
Ripe juniper berries

== Distribution and habitat ==
As the name implies, it is mainly in numerous California habitats, although its range also extends through most of Baja California, a short distance into the Great Basin in southern Nevada, and into northwestern Arizona. In California it is found in: the Peninsular Ranges, Transverse Ranges, California Coast Ranges, Sacramento Valley foothills, Sierra Nevada, and at higher elevation sky islands in the Mojave Desert ranges. It is also found off of the North American continental shelf, on Guadalupe Island in the Pacific Ocean, where there are less than 10 individuals.

It grows at moderate altitudes of 750–1,600 m (2,460–5,250 ft). Habitats include: pinyon–juniper woodland with single-leaf pinyon (Pinus monophylla); Joshua tree woodland; and foothill woodlands, in the montane chaparral and woodlands and interior chaparral and woodlands sub-ecoregions.

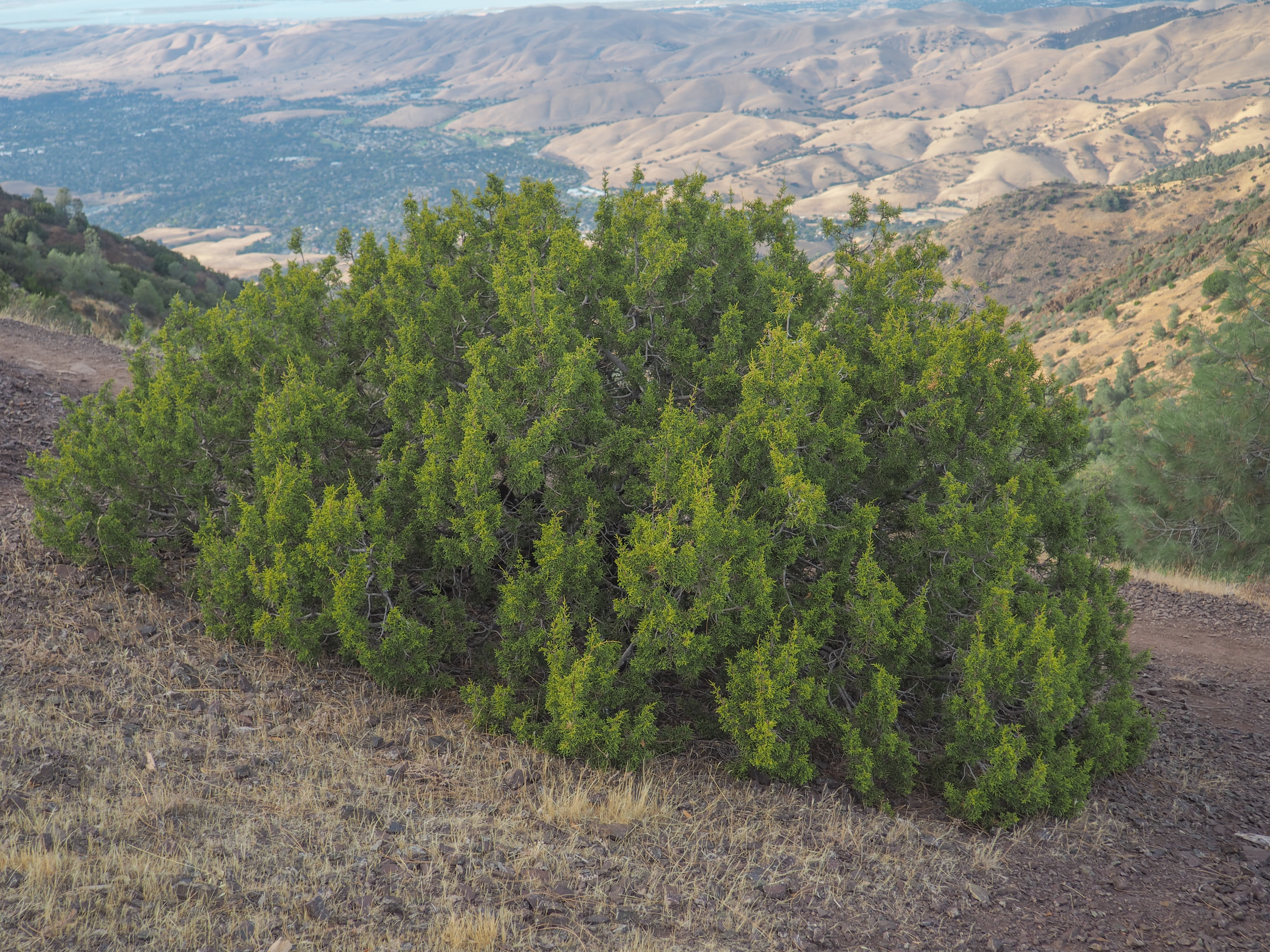
Shrubby form on Mt Diablo in the Diablo Range

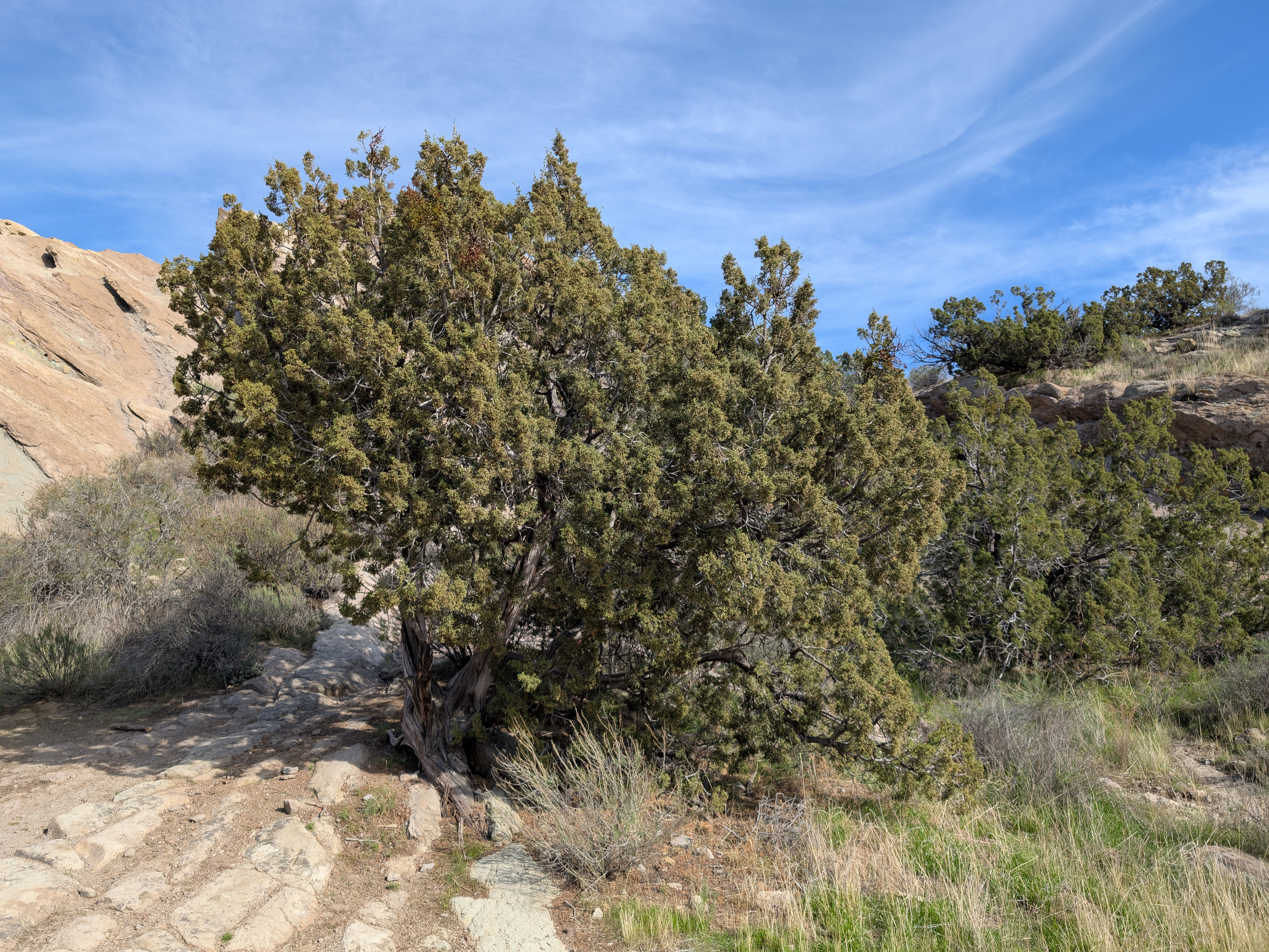
More arborescent form at Vasquez Rocks

== Conservation ==
The species is listed by the International Union for Conservation of Nature as least concern, and not considered globally threatened. However, one of the southernmost populations, formerly on Guadalupe Island off the Baja California Peninsula coast, was almost destroyed by feral goats in the late 19th century, with only a few plants remaining.

== Ecology ==
J. californica provides food and shelter for a variety of native species, such as turkeys, deer, and many others. However, as the species matures, it becomes too tall to provide adequate food and shelter for deer and other ground animals of similar size. J. californica is a larval host for the native moth sequoia sphinx (Sphinx sequoiae).

== Uses ==
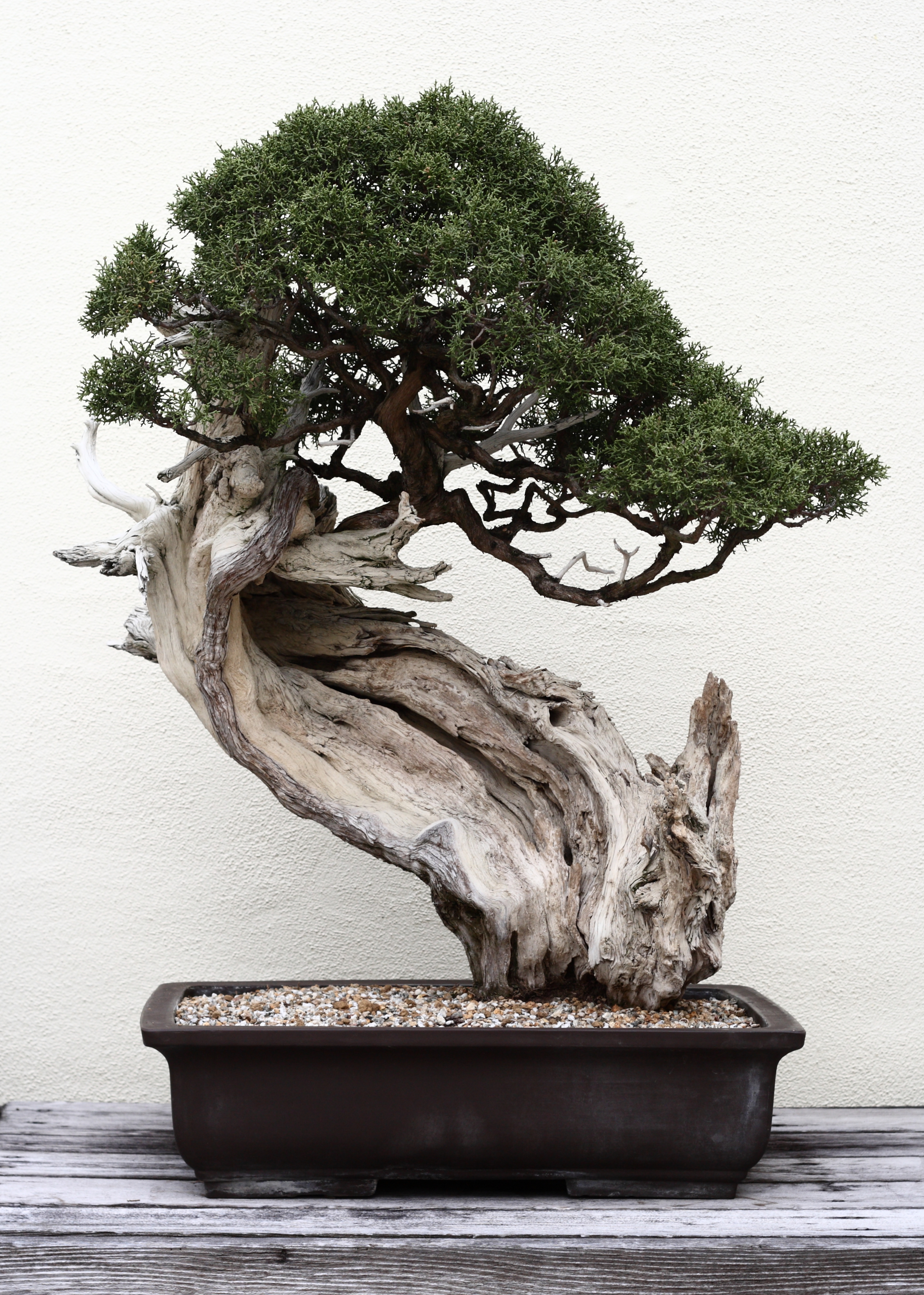
Bonsai form

The plant was used as a traditional Native American medicinal plant, and as a food source, by the indigenous peoples of California, including the Cahuilla people, Kumeyaay people (Diegueno), Serrano, and Ohlone people. They gathered the berries to eat fresh and to grind into meal for baking. The Ohlone ate the berries, but are reported to have considered the taste to be poor. The wood was also used for sinew-backed bows.

Decoctions of the leaves were used by the Ohlone to relieve pain and cause sweating.

J. californica is cultivated as an ornamental plant, as a dense shrub (and eventual tree) for use in habitat gardens, heat and drought-tolerant gardens, and in natural landscaping design. It is very tolerant of alkali soil, and can provide erosion control on dry slopes. It is also a popular species for bonsai.
