= County Line Road (Santa Clara–Stanislaus counties, California) =

Road in California

County Line Road is an unimproved road between the San Antonio Valley and Fifield Ranch that closely follows the east–west divide of the Diablo Range and the County boundary of Santa Clara County, and Stanislaus County, California. This road followed the route called La Vereda del Monte, used by Californio mesteñeros and the gang of Joaquin Murrieta and other bandits and horse-thieves, and sites of three of their camps along the route are found along it. Two sites are now state park campgrounds, the last is at ranch dating back to the 1860s.

== Route ==
County Line Road begins at the end of the 3.6 miles of the Upper San Antonio Road. The last 1.8 miles of which is a hiking, biking, and horse trail within Henry Coe State Park. County Line Road within Henry W. Coe State Park and Orestimba Wilderness is used as a hiking, biking, and horse trail. It is 29.6 miles long within the State Park and begins at altitude of 2,134 feet. Traveling the entire trail is 59.4 miles.

== History ==
What became the County Line Road was originally a trail, used by Native Americans to travel along the divide of the Diablo Range. It was later used by Californio and other mesteñeros from the early 1840s to drive Alta California horses to Sonora for sale and was known as La Vereda del Monte. The gang of Joaquin Murrieta used the trail in the early 1850s to drive stolen horses and mustangs to their base at the Arroyo de Cantua. Three of the mesteñeros camps were found along or nearby its route, Valle Atravesado, Valle Hondo and Estación Romero. Droves of wild horses were held at Mustang Flat and Paradise Flat and driven up along route of the Long Ridge Road to Mustang Peak to be joined to the drove moving southward along La Vereda from Valle Atrevesado or Valle Hondo.

County Line Road was built in the 20th century by Murray Hopkins who built the County Line Road along the divide of the Diablo Range between San Antonio Valley and Pacheco Pass. He also dammed Mississippi Creek, at Valle Atravesado on its south side creating what is now a reservoir called Mississippi Lake, originally named Murray Lake, on the upper reach of Mississippi Creek. Today the dam is called Mississippi Dam.
