= East Fork Pacheco Creek =

East Fork Pacheco Creek is a 5 mile long tributary stream of North Fork Pacheco Creek in the Diablo Range in Santa Clara County, California. Its confluence with the North Fork is at an elevation of 610 feet (190 meters). Its source is located about a half mile nortnortheast of the Fifield Ranch at 37°08′07″N 121°13′47″W at an elevation of 1,600 feet (490 meters) just west of County Line Road that runs along the crest of the Diablo Range between Santa Clara County and Stanislaus County, California about a quarter mile before its intersection with the Fifield Grade and McCabe Road that climbs upward from the canyon of Romero Creek on the east slope of the Diablo Range in Merced County, California.
