= Hagerman Peak (Diablo Range) =

Mountain peak in California, USA

Coordinates: 37°06′45″N 121°14′19″W

Hagerman Peak is a summit in the Diablo Range, in Santa Clara County, California. It rises to an elevation of 1,768 feet (539 meters).
