= Valle Atravesado =

Valle Atravesado, (Crossed Valley), a small, east–west running valley that crosses the north–south running valley of the upper reach of Mississippi Creek in the Diablo Range, in Santa Clara County, California.

== History ==
Valle Atravesado was so named because it lay across the north–south running La Vereda del Monte in and east–west direction from 37°11′52″N 121°24′57″W to 37°11′52″N 121°25′15″W. It was an overnight camp that with steep slopes and a brush corral made it an overnight stop for the droves of mustangs of mesteñeros from the early 1840s to drive Alta California horses to Sonora for sale. It was also used in the early 1850s when mustangs and stolen horses were held here overnight by Joaquin Murrieta's horse gang as they drove them down the rest of La Vereda Caballo to Sonora for sale.

The valley has been subsequently flooded when Mississippi Creek, that runs southward through it, was dammed in the 20th century on the south side of Valle Atrevesado and is now a reservoir. This reservoir was originally named Murray Lake, named after its builder Murray Hopkins, who not only built the reservoir but the 59 miles of County Line Road along the divide of the Diablo Range between San Antonio Valley and Fifield Ranch.

== Today ==
Today the reservoir is called Mississippi Lake and the dam, Mississippi Dam.
