= North Fork Pacheco Creek =

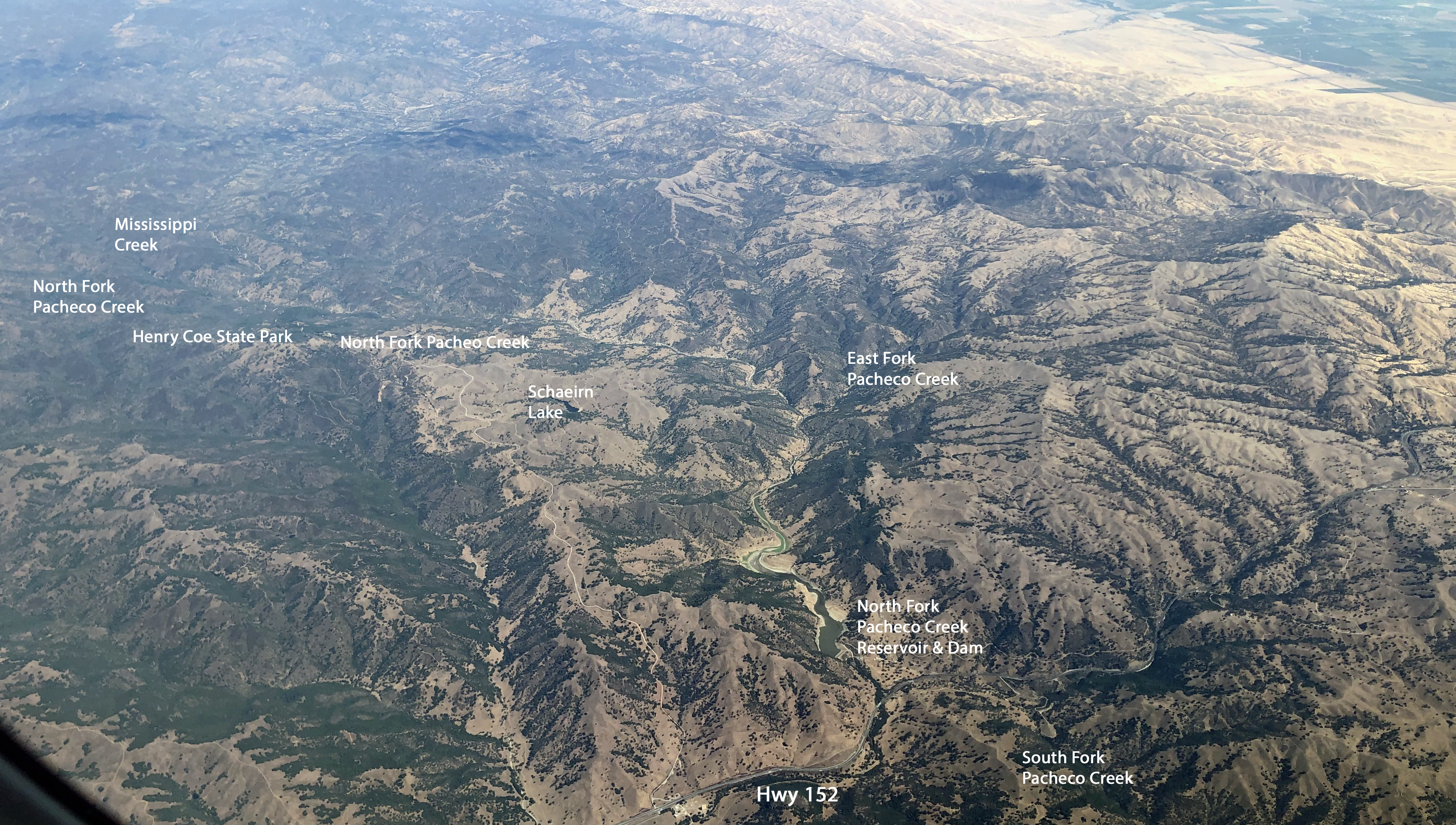
- Aerial Photo of North Fork Pacheco Creek Watershed in the Diablo Range of Northern California

Location
- Country: United States
- State: California
- Region: Santa Clara County

Physical characteristics
- Source
  - location: Henry Coe State Park
  - coordinates: 37°11′17″N 121°25′42″W
  - elevation: 2,360 ft (720 m)
- Mouth: Confluence of North Fork Pacheco Creek and South Fork Pacheco Creek
  - location: 16.5 mi (27 km) east of Gilroy
  - coordinates: 37°02′42″N 121°17′23″W
  - elevation: 430 ft (130 m)

Basin features
- Tributaries
  - left: Mississippi Creek, East Fork Pacheco Creek

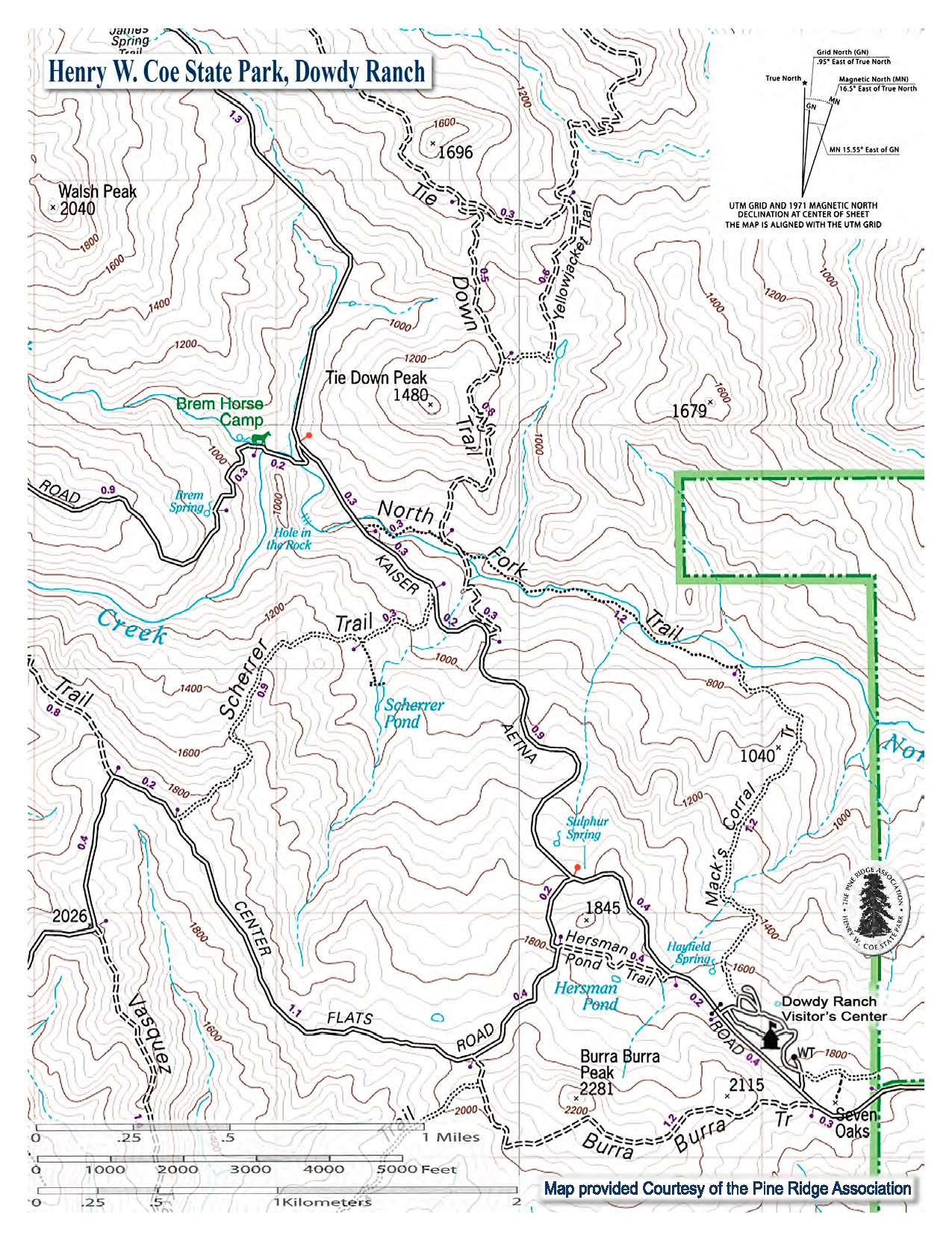
Map of southeastern Henry Coe State Park in the Diablo Range of California, showing North Fork Pacheco Creek and the "Hole in the Rock" barrier to upstream steelhead trout runs below the Brem Horse Camp

North Fork Pacheco Creek is a 19 miles (31 km) tributary stream of Pacheco Creek, in Santa Clara County, California. Originally it was considered the upper reach of Pacheco Creek. Its source is at an elevation of 2,360 feet (720 m) at 37°11′17″N 121°25′42″W on a mountain side in Henry W. Coe State Park and is the headwaters of the Pajaro River watershed.

== History ==
In 1993, archaeologist Mark Hylkema documented eight different Native American sites on the Andresen Ranch along the lower North Fork Pacheco Creek, dating from 1000 B.C. to 500 A.D. These included multiple human burials, both adult and juvenile. He concluded that the interior of the Diablo Range north of Pacheco Pass was extensively occupied. Although Central Valley Yokuts may have utilized this area, archaeologist E. Breck Parkman, who studied sites along upper North Fork Pacheco Creek, summarized evidence that the primary occupants were Ohlone, of the Tomoi, Locobo, and Cobo Ohlone peoples. These peoples were removed to Missions Santa Clara and Santa Cruz between 1800 and 1808.

In 1931, the Pacheco Pass Water District, which included land holdings from both Santa Clara and San Benito counties, broke from the Hollister Irrigation District, and built the Pacheco Dam on North Fork Pacheco Creek in 1939.

Valley Water (formerly the Santa Clara Valley Water District) had planned to build a new 320 feet (98 m) high dam on the North Fork Pacheco Creek, but in August 2025 they canceled the project as cost overruns soared from the $969 million estimate in 2017 to $3.2 billion and after the federal Bureau of Reclamation decided not to share water from San Luis Reservoir.

== Watershed ==
The North Fork Pacheco Creek has two main tributaries. Furthest upstream is the Mississippi Creek tributary of North Fork Pacheco Creek. It is 9.5 miles (15.3 km) long and has an impoundment (Mississippi Reservoir) above 2,100 feet (640 m) elevation. Mississippi Creek sources on Bear Mountain on the northern side of Henry W. Coe State Park. The North Fork Pacheco Creek also receives the 6 miles (9.7 km) long East Fork Pacheco Creek, at Chimney Rock before reaching Pacheco Reservoir and Dam, the latter just north of Highway 152. The Pacheco Dam is 0.4 miles (0.64 km) above the confluence of North Fork Pacheco Creek and South Fork Pacheco Creek. That confluence forms the source of the Pacheco Creek mainstem at an elevation of 430 feet (130 m).

There are two named waterfalls on North Fork Pacheco Creek, the "Hole in the Rock" waterfall is 12 miles (19 km) upstream from the dam and is located just above the Kaiser-Aetna Road, and a second waterfall called "Pacheco Falls", is a popular hiking destination another 2.5 miles (4.0 km) further upstream.

In 2019, the U.S. Bureau of Reclamation released a draft environmental report that the 100-foot earthen (North Fork) Pacheco Creek dam be replaced with a $1.1 billion dam that would increase reservoir capacity from 5,500 acre-feet to 140,000 acre feet, making it larger than Anderson Reservoir, currently the largest reservoir in Santa Clara County. However, environmentalists have proposed a smaller dam on only the East Fork Pacheco Creek, so that only one stream would be blocked instead of two, and enabling the opening of the North Fork Pacheco Creek to spawning runs of steelhead trout to the perennial waters in the upper watershed within Henry Coe State Park.

== Ecology ==
The construction of the North Fork Dam to create Pacheco Reservoir in 1939 created an impassable barrier to in-migrating steelhead trout (Oncorhynchus mykiss), preventing access to over 12 miles (19 km) of stream consisting of the mainstem of North Fork Pacheco Creek below its confluence with Mississippi Creek. These fish belong to the South-Central California Coast Steelhead distinct population segment which have been federally listed as threatened since 1997.

In 1973 Fish and Game Warden W. I. Donahue reported that "high quality spawning and rearing habitat with perennial flow occurred upstream from Pacheco Dam on the North Fork, but was unavailable to steelhead because of the dam." In contrast, in his 1970's PhD thesis, Professor Jerry Smith of San Jose State University observed that the North Fork above the dam has only short very warm reaches of regularly intermittent habitat unlikely to support trout. He also observed that a stair-step gorge with impassable chutes and bedrock pools below a waterfall were located just above the Kaiser-Aetna Road crossing and below the confluence of Mississippi Creek and North Fork Pacheco Creek (today's Brem Horse Camp in Henry Coe State Park) would be a barrier to adult trout upstream passage. The only trout he observed in the North Fork Pacheco Creek watershed were in Mississippi Reservoir, where the previous owner of the ranch (acquired by the Park in 1983) had stocked trout. However, his observations date only to the late 1970s, over 30 years after Pacheco Dam was built. Smith cited earlier historical observer records, dating to pre-dam conditions in the 1920s, indicating the presence of trout in upper creek reaches now within Henry Coe State Park. Robert Brem's family, according to his nearly 90-year-old uncle, regularly fished for trout and swam in large perennial pools on their ranch at the "Hole in the Rock" below the confluence of Mississippi Creek and the North Fork Pacheco Creek mainstem, the same pools described by Professor Smith below the Brem Horse Camp and above Kaiser-Aetna Road. Mr. Brem also stated (personal communication) that steelhead smolts moved downstream before the North Fork dried up.

If the Pacheco Dam is dismantled, and not re-built, then in wet years steelhead trout could again access the upper reaches of North Fork Pacheco Creek mainstem again, although limited to 12 miles (19 km) of the North Fork mainstem's 19 miles (31 km) by the rocky barriers at the Hole in the Rock (which also render access to Mississippi Creek impossible). If the dam is re-built it will remain an impassable barrier, in which case steelhead trout could be maintained in the reach just below the dam as long as flows are released in late April and May to enable successful outmigration of any smolts rearing below the dam to reach the ocean downstream. However, it may not be possible to guarantee flow releases in late spring in drought years. When late spring flows from Anderson Reservoir on nearby Coyote Creek where withheld in the dry years 2015–2017, inability to outmigrate to saltwater resulted in extirpation of the anadromous steelhead trout population there. The importation of non-native predator fish along with San Luis Reservoir water, including non-native largemouth bass (Micropterus salmoides) and striped bass (Morone saxatilis), and/or illegal introduction of these species (typical for large California reservoirs), also pose a potential threat to North Fork Pacheco Creek steelhead trout, should Pacheco Dam be re-built. Releasing dry season flows below a new Pacheco Dam is likely to harm rather than help steelhead trout as changing the creek from seasonal to perennial would enable it to support non-native predators of steelhead young such as largemouth bass and American bullfrog (Lithobates catesbeianus). Invasive non-native species are the second largest cause of extinction of North American fishes.

Other native fish in North Fork Pacheco Creek include Monterey sucker (Catostomus occidentalis mniotiltus) and Sacramento pikeminnow (Ptychocheilus grandis).

== See also ==
- Pacheco Creek
