= Fifield Ranch =

Coordinates: 37°07′46″N 121°13′57″W

Fifield Ranch is a locale within the Diablo Range in Santa Clara County, California. It lies at an elevation of 1,512 feet (461 meters), west of the head of Romero Creek and the Santa Clara County line, about a mile north of Hagerman Peak. It is at the source of a tributary canyon and stream to Chimney Gulch, itself a tributary of East Fork Pacheco Creek.

== History ==
Before the ranch existed, in the early 1850s, this location on a rolling plateau of grassland and oak groves was called Estación Romero and was a major station for the gang of Joaquin Murrieta along La Vereda del Monte, that followed what is now the course of County Line Road from San Antonio Valley to where the ranch is located today. This station gathered in horses captured from the San Joaquin Valley opposite Arroyos Quinto, Romero, Alamos and San Luis Gonzaga. Mustangs could be driven up trails from these arroyos to meet the droves moving southward along La Vereda.

Estación Romero was also a major hangout for the gang of Joaquin Murrieta with a spring and pasture land. It was located close by to the north of Pacheco Pass a major trail between the San Joaquin Valley and the coastal counties. At that time the lands along that trail were not settled except for a few scattered ranchos and was ideal for robbing and murdering unwary or poorly armed isolated individuals and small groups of men returning from the goldfields. Also a brush and pole corral for the holding of stolen horses was located nearby in Bull Heads Canyon where they were kept until they could be added into a passing drove on La Vereda at early daylight.

The site got its current name from the settler who built the main part of the house on the site just prior to 1860.
