= Flat (landform) =

Relatively level surface of land within a region of greater relief

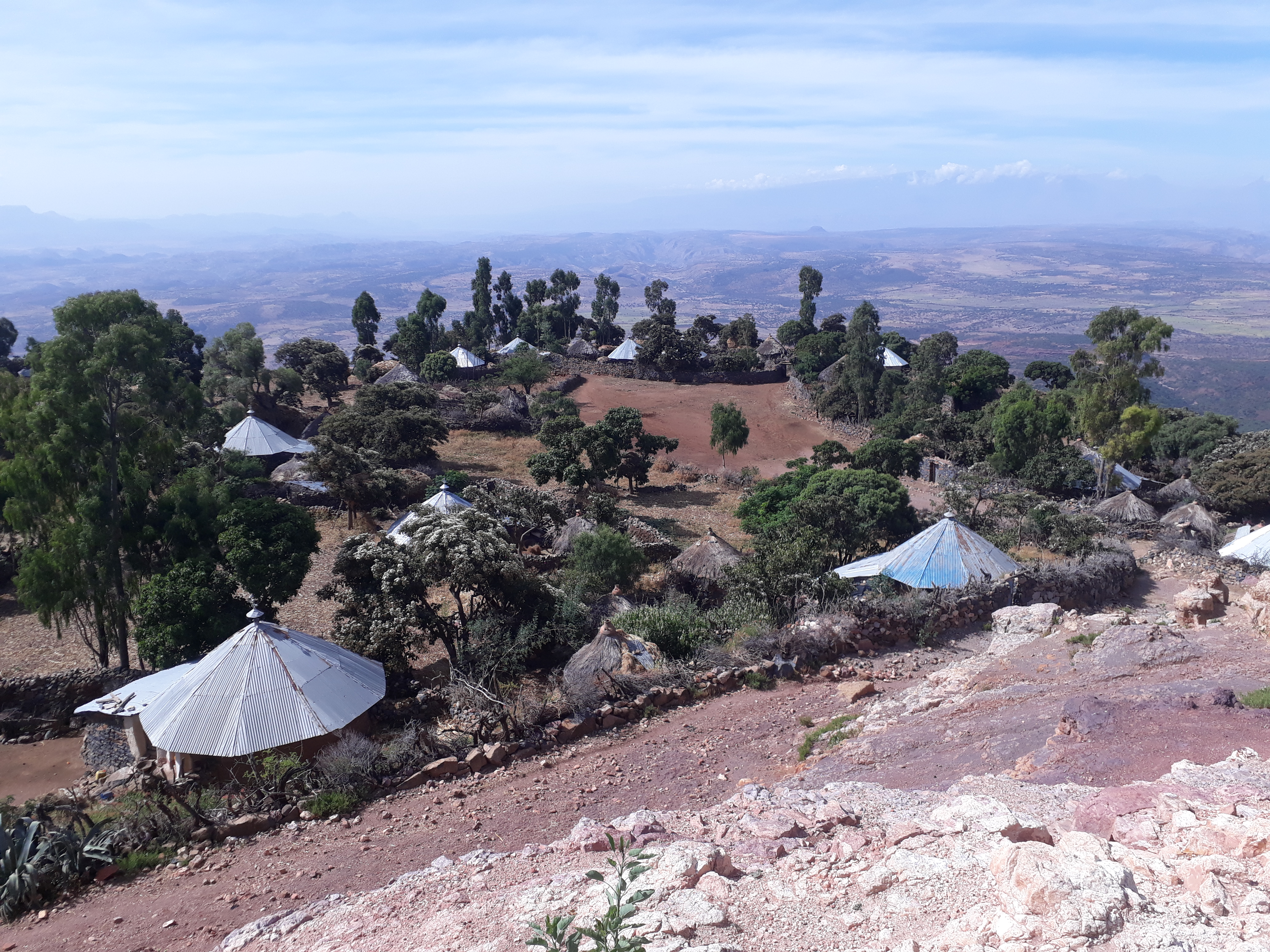
The village of Santarfa in Ethiopia is established on a structural flat along a 1000-metre-high escarpment

A flat is a relatively level surface of land within a region of greater relief, such as hills or mountains, usually used in the plural. The term is often used to name places with such features, for example, Yucca Flat or Henninger Flats.

Flat is also used to describe other level geographic areas as mud flats or salt flats.

== See also ==
- Glade – Open area within a woodland
- Dry lake – Area that contained a standing surface water body
