= Owings =

Owings may refer to:

== People ==
- Albin Owings Kuhn (1916–2010), chancellor at the University of Maryland
- Chris Owings (born 1991), American professional baseball utility player
- Donald H. Owings (1943–2011), professor of psychology at the University of California, Davis
- George W. Owings Jr. (died 1984), American politician from Maryland
- George W. Owings III (1945–2023), American politician
- Lewis Owings (1820–1875), American politician, physician, and businessman
- Micah Owings (born 1982), American professional baseball player
- Nathaniel A. Owings (1903–1984), American architect and co-founder of Skidmore, Owings, and Merrill
- Richard Lemon Owings (1812–1902), American frontiersman

== Other uses ==
- Owings, Maryland, a community in the United States
- Skidmore, Owings and Merrill, an architectural firm

== See also ==
- Owings Mills (disambiguation)
