= Anthony Wood =

Anthony Wood may refer to:

- Anthony Wood (antiquary) (1632–1695), English antiquary
- Anthony Wood (businessman) (born 1965), British-born American billionaire businessman
- Anthony Wood (historian) (1923–1987), British school teacher and historian
- Anthony Wood (artist) (1925–2022), British heraldic artist

== See also ==
- Tony Wood (disambiguation)
- Anthony Woods (born 1980), United States Army soldier discharged for violating the military's "Don't ask, don't tell" policy
- Tony Woods (disambiguation)
