= John F. Wood Jr. =

American politician (1936–2023)

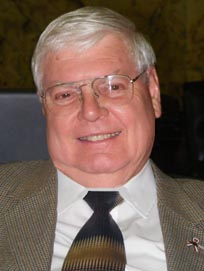

Member of the Maryland House of Delegates from the 29A district
- In office 1995 – January 14, 2015
- Preceded by: George W. Owings III
- Succeeded by: Matthew Morgan

Member of the Maryland House of Delegates from the District 28B district
- In office January 14, 1987 – 1994
- Preceded by: John Knight Parlett
- Succeeded by: district dissolved

Personal details
- Born: January 13, 1936; Leonardtown, Maryland, U.S.
- Died: June 9, 2023 (aged 87); Mechanicsville, Maryland, U.S.
- Political party: Democratic
- Spouse: Barbara
- Children: 9
- Occupation: Politician; insurance broker

John F. Wood Jr. (January 13, 1936 – June 9, 2023) was an American Democratic politician who represented District 28B from 1987 to 1994 and District 29A from 1995 to 2015 in the Maryland House of Delegates.

== Early life ==
John F. Wood Jr. was born on January 13, 1936, in Leonardtown, Maryland. He attended Charlotte Hall Military Academy and served in the Maryland National Guard as a sergeant from 1952 to 1960.

== Career ==
Wood was the owner and operator of Wood's Food Rite from 1962 to 1993. He worked as a partner for Cross and Wood Insurance Brokers from 1993.

== In the legislature ==
Wood served as a member of the Maryland House of Delegates for 28 years (1987 to 2015). He served as a Democrat. He represented District 28B from 1987 to 1994. He then represented District 29A from 1995 to 2015. In his time he served on the House Appropriations and Legislative Policy Committees and its public safety, administration, and personnel oversight subcommittees.

Wood acted as the Chair of the Commerce and Government Matters Committee from 1999 to 2003 and the chair of the Joint Committee on Administrative, Executive and Legislative Review, 2003-0.

=== Legislative notes ===
- Voted against the Clean Indoor Air Act of 2007 (HB359)

== Personal life and death ==
Wood was married and had nine children.

Wood died at his home in Mechanicsville, Maryland, on June 9, 2023, at the age of 87.
