= Ed Rothstein =

American politician (born 1963)

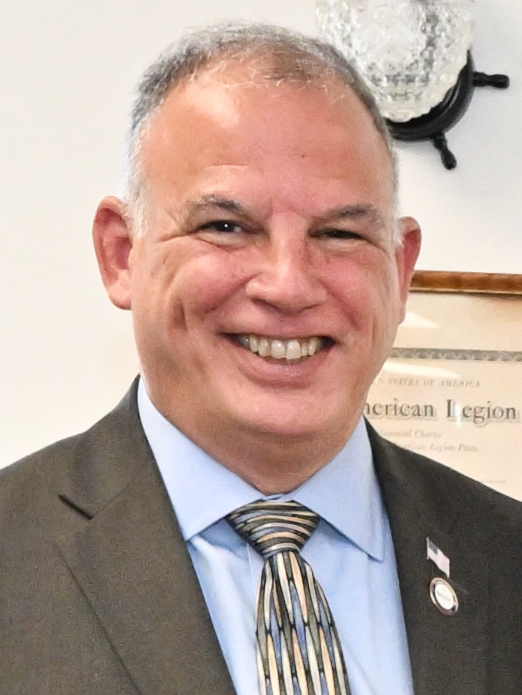
- Rothstein in 2023

Secretary of the Maryland Department of Veterans and Military Families
- In office August 1, 2025 – November 6, 2026
- Governor: Wes Moore
- Preceded by: Ross Cohen (acting)
- Succeeded by: James Anderson (acting)

Member of the Carroll County Board of Commissioners from the 5th district
- In office December 4, 2018 – July 31, 2025
- Preceded by: J. Douglas Howard
- Succeeded by: Susan W. Krebs

Personal details
- Born: 1963 (age 62–63) New Jersey, U.S.
- Party: Republican
- Spouse: Audrey Short (m. 1994)
- Children: 2
- Education: Lock Haven University of Pennsylvania (BA); Webster University (MA); National Defense University (MS)

Military service
- Branch/service: United States Army
- Years of service: 1983–2014
- Rank: Colonel
- Unit: 743rd Military Intelligence Battalion; 302nd Military Intelligence Battalion; V Corps; 7th Infantry Division
- Battles/wars: Iraq War; War in Afghanistan

Edward Charles Rothstein (born 1963) is an American politician and former U.S. Army colonel who served as the secretary of the Maryland Department of Veterans and Military Families from 2025 to 2026. A member of the Republican Party, he was a member of the Carroll County Board of Commissioners from 2018 to 2025.

== Early life and education ==
Rothstein was born outside of Wayne, New Jersey, in 1963. His mother, Marilyn, was a nurse and his father, Harold Rothstein, was a high school biology teacher who served in the Korean War. Raised in Wayne, he graduated in 1982 from Wayne Valley High School.

Rothstein graduated from Lock Haven University of Pennsylvania, where he earned a Bachelor of Science degree in education in 1986; Webster University, where he earned a Master of Arts degree in human resource development in 1999; and National Defense University, where he earned a Master of Science degree in national resource strategy in 2010.

== Military career ==
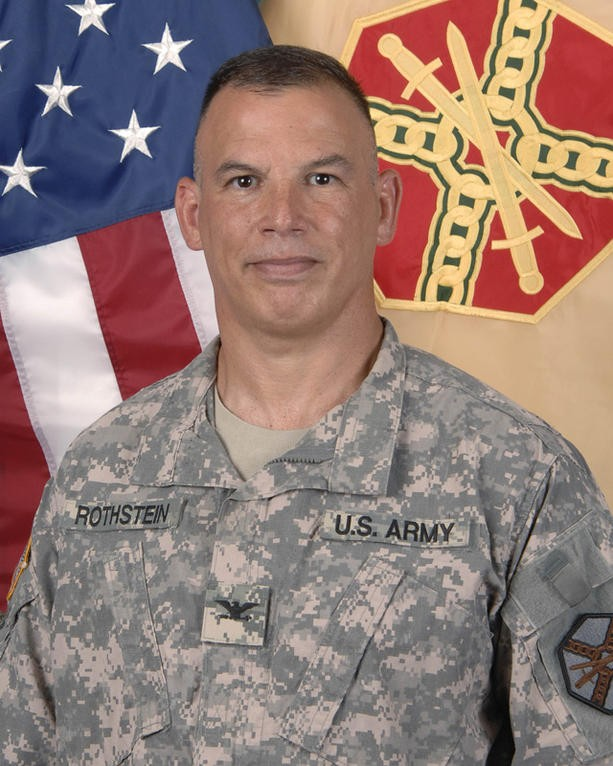
Rothstein's official military portrait

Rothstein enlisted in the United States Army Reserve in 1983, and was in active duty as a commissioned officer in the Chemical Corps in 1986. His first tour of duty was in Germany, serving first in military intelligence in the air defense artillery unit before transitioning to the military intelligence corps in 1990. Rothstein returned to the United States to attend military school at Fort Ord, where he served in the light infantry battalion and met his future wife, Audrey.

After leaving Fort Ord, Rothstein worked in the National Security Agency at Fort Meade, where he worked in strategic intelligence with the 743rd Military Intelligence Battalion. He was later stationed at The Pentagon, working in information operations as a staff action officer, and served on Bill Clinton's inaugural committee. Rothstein and his family eventually moved to Fort Leavenworth, where he obtained additional schooling. They moved to Germany in 1999, where Rothstein served for six years in the 302nd Military Intelligence Battalion and V Corps in Heidelberg and Wiesbaden and then in multiple staff positions for the United States European Command, supporting U.S. operations in Yugoslavia and Kosovo. Rothstein later moved to Colorado, where he worked at Fort Carson as a senior intelligence officer for the 7th Infantry Division from 2005 to 2007. He also served in both Iraq and Afghanistan.

In 2007, Rothstein moved to Carroll County, Maryland, returning to the National Security Agency at Fort Meade, where he served as a garrison commander until he retired in 2014. During his tenure, he worked with the Fort Meade Alliance Foundation to fund the construction of the Education and Resiliency Center at Fort Meade. After retiring, Rothstein started his own company, ERA Advisors LLC, and worked as a senior cyber security advisor to Bay Bank, F.S.B. from 2016 to 2018.

== Political career ==
=== Carroll County commissioner ===
In 2018, Rothstein ran for the fifth district seat of the Carroll County Board of Commissioners as a Republican. He was endorsed by incumbent county commissioner Doug Howard during the Republican primary, which he won with 45.6% of the vote in June 2018. Rothstein ran unopposed in the general election and was sworn in on December 4, 2018. He was re-elected to a second term in 2022 after defeating two challengers in the Republican primary in July 2022.

During his tenure, Rothstein advocated for programs to support small businesses impacted by the COVID-19 pandemic in Maryland, supported a countywide ban on solar projects on farmland, and introduced legislation to enact a $3,000 impact fee on new housing developments. He served as the board's vice president from 2018 to 2021, and as its president from 2021 to 2023. Rothstein condemned the January 6 United States Capitol attack, saying that the events that occurred during the attack "could be considered the norm at one time" in many of the countries he toured during his military career. He supported former governor Larry Hogan's candidacy in the 2024 United States Senate election in Maryland and worked with the Hogan campaign to rally party veterans around his campaign.

Rothstein resigned from the Carroll County Board of Commissioners on July 31, 2025. The Carroll County Republican Central Committee nominated former state delegate Susan W. Krebs to serve the remainder of Rothstein's term on August 15, 2025.

=== Maryland Secretary of Veterans ===
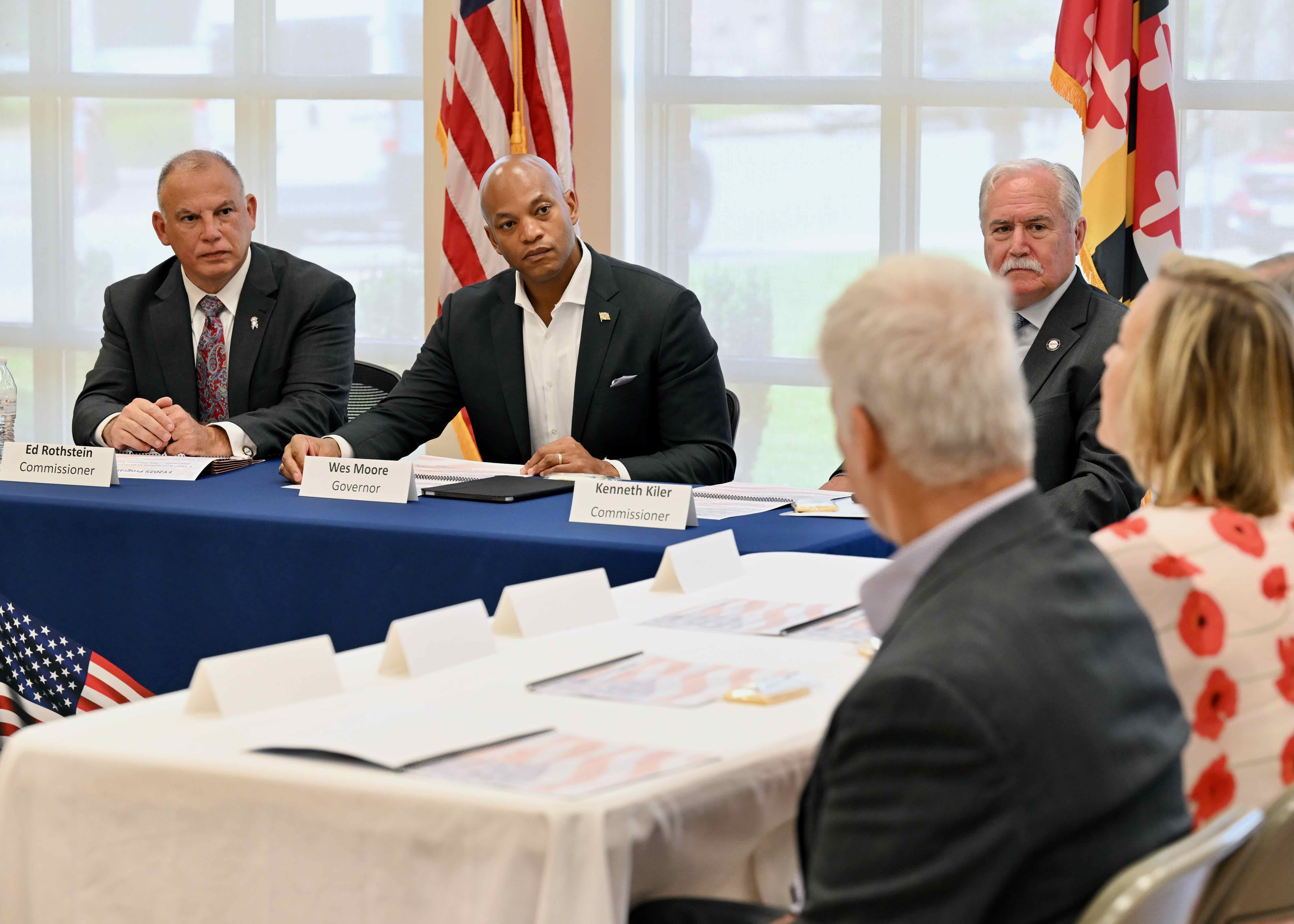
Rothstein and Governor Wes Moore at a Maryland Department of Veterans and Military Families event in Carroll County, 2025

On July 14, 2025, Governor Wes Moore announced that he would appoint Rothstein as the Secretary of the Maryland Department of Veterans and Military Families, succeeding Anthony Woods, who resigned in May 2025. He took office on August 1, 2025. In an interview with The Baltimore Banner, Rothstein said that he would focus on improving housing and treatment for veterans, and would look to build the state's second veterans home in Sykesville.

Rothstein resigned as Maryland Secretary of Veterans and Military Families on November 6, 2026, a few days after Moore won re-election to a second term.

== Personal life ==
Rothstein married his wife, Audrey Short, on September 4, 1994. Together, they have two children and live in Eldersburg, Maryland. He is Jewish.

Rothstein struggled with mental health issues during his military career. He credits the United States Department of Veterans Affairs with helping him "identify the demons I had in myself" and now takes medication to help him address his mental health.

Rothstein is a fan of the Baltimore Orioles. In August 2011, he threw the first pitch a Bowie Baysox game celebrating Fort Meade Day.

== Electoral history ==
2018 Carroll County Board of Commissioners 5th district election
Primary election
| Party | Candidate | Votes | % |
|---|---|---|---|
| Republican | Ed Rothstein | 1,331 | 45.6 |
| Republican | Kathy Fuller | 759 | 26.0 |
| Republican | Frank Robert | 678 | 23.2 |
| Republican | Dave Greenwalt | 152 | 5.2 |
General election
| Republican | Ed Rothstein | 12,443 | 96.7 |
| Write-in | | 418 | 3.3 |

2022 Carroll County Board of Commissioners 5th district election
Primary election
| Party | Candidate | Votes | % |
|---|---|---|---|
| Republican | Ed Rothstein (incumbent) | 2,175 | 56.8 |
| Republican | Kate M. Maerten | 1,115 | 29.1 |
| Republican | Cathey Allison | 538 | 14.1 |
General election
| Republican | Ed Rothstein (incumbent) | 10,861 | 96.6 |
| Write-in | | 386 | 3.4 |
