= Tony Wood =

Tony Wood may refer to:

- Tony Wood (producer), television producer
- Tony Wood (musician) (born 1961), American Christian musician
- Tony Wood (Australian businessman), Australian businessman
- Tony Wood (British businessman) (born 1966), British businessman
- Tony Wood (historian), American historian of Russia

== See also ==
- Anthony Wood (disambiguation)
- Anthony Woods (born 1980), United States Army soldier discharged for violating the military's "Don't ask, don't tell" policy
- Tony Woods (disambiguation)
