= Robosquirrel =

Robotic squirrel

The second version of field robosquirrel

Robosquirrel refers to several versions of robotic squirrels developed by researchers at the University of California, Davis and San Diego State University. Robosquirrel is currently in use and development in an interdisciplinary research project that uses biorobotics to investigate how communication between prey (e.g., squirrels) and predators (e.g., rattlesnakes) evolve in response to each other. It has received extensive science and popular media coverage. It stirred controversy when Senator Tom Coburn listed it in his Wastebook 2012 as a scientific research project that wastes United States federal tax dollars. Senator Coburn's release of Wastebook 2012 was quickly picked up by the popular media and the robosquirrel project was the headline of many media stories.

The robosquirrel research project, in which robosquirrel is used and developed, has four aims: (1) to establish collaborations between ecologists and engineers to develop next generation robotic technology for studying predator-prey communication behavior, (2) to increase minority participation in science, (3) to develop public outreach, and (4) to support undergraduate and graduate education in biology and engineering. Currently, three versions of robosquirrel have been developed. It is currently funded by the National Science Foundation (NSF) based on peer review and by meeting criteria of intellectual merit and broader impacts required by NSF.

The controversy focuses on the amount of money spent ($325,000) on robosquirrel. The researchers have responded that robosquirrel only cost a few hundred dollars and that approximately 70% of the funds are currently spent on training future biologists and engineers.

== Robosquirrels ==
=== Background ===
Donald Owings observed an interesting phenomenon during research in the field: when a California ground squirrel comes across a rattlesnake, it often raises its tail and waves it from side to side.

In 2007, Owings (Department of Psychology and his graduate student at the time, Aaron Rundus, began collaborating with Sanjay Joshi (Department of Mechanical/Aeronautical Engineering) at University of California, Davis. They used an infrared camera to videotape how snakes and squirrels behaviorally interact. They found that a squirrel shunts blood to its tail and thereby heats it up when encountering a rattlesnake but not for non-poisonous snakes.

Rattlesnakes were known to use infrared radiation to detect prey, but what they discovered suggests that the squirrels evolved the ability to communicate with rattlesnakes by heating up their tails and thereby signalling with infrared radiation.

To test this hypothesis, they built a robotic squirrel (robosquirrel) that could behaviorally respond to rattlesnakes when they moved. They found that when robosquirrel waved a heated tail in response to the movement of a rattlesnake, the snake became defensive (i.e., it moved away from the robotic squirrel) rather than predatory. If robosquirrel waved an unheated tail, then the rattlesnake continued its predatory behavior.

The next step was to determine whether squirrel behavior when rattlesnakes had not been encountered reduced the predatory behavior of rattlesnakes waiting in ambush. They video-recorded predatory behavior of rattlesnakes when ground squirrels flagged their tails. The researchers found that tail-flagging decreased the likelihood that rattlesnakes would strike and increased the likelihood that they would move away from that area.

They found that California ground squirrels are actually performing two types of tail flagging: vigilance advertising and perception advertising. Vigilance advertising is hypothesized to occur when a squirrel enters an area that may contain rattlesnakes. By tail flagging, a squirrel may be signaling to a snake that it is vigilant and prepared to dodge any attacks. Perception advertising is hypothesized to occur when a squirrel encounters a rattlesnake and its tail flagging functions to signal to the snake that it is prepared to respond to attack and to warn other squirrels of the presence of rattlesnakes.

To test these hypotheses about the function of tail flagging, they built robosquirrel to record encounters with rattlesnakes. Robosquirrel was programmed to wag its tail in the presence of a snake and its tail temperature can increase above its body temperature when it encounters snakes. The robosquirrel behaviors presented to rattlesnakes in naturalistic contexts can be precisely controlled. This control of behavior is impossible with living squirrels and so robosquirrel allows researchers to investigate how rattlesnakes respond to specific behaviors.

The first laboratory version of robosquirrel (bottom panel). The top panel is from an infrared video of a squirrel confronting a gopher snake and the head (H) and tail (T) do not heat up. The middle panel is from infrared video of a squirrel confronting a rattlesnake and the head (H) and tail (T) do heat up.

=== Versions ===
==== Laboratory RoboSquirrel ====
The first robosquirrel was built using a taxidermically mounted adult female California ground squirrel. The tail was moved by a servo, which allowed robosquirrel to flag it tail at specified intervals. MATLAB software via a mini synchronous serial channel microcontroller, controlled the tail-flagging of robosquirrel.

To control the temperature of the interior of robosquirrel’s body, a coiled Nichrome 80 resistance wire was inserted and a cartridge heater was inserted into its tail. The temperature of the Nichrome wire and the cartridge heater were controlled by thermostats wired with thermocouples that were placed inside its body and tail. Power to the two heaters was regulated via the thermostats by using a proportional-integral differential (PID) control loop to regulate the duty cycle of the power relays.

An overhead camera videotaped the arena in which robosquirrel was mounted on a wooden stage beneath which were the theromostats and heater relays. A Rattlesnake was marked by attaching a small red light-emitting diode (LED) it. When a snake entered the arena, the images from the arena were analyzed by a program written in MATLAB that determined the distance between the squirrel and the LED. The program then calculated the rate of tail flagging based on the distance between the LED and robosquirrel. As the distance between the squirrel and LED on the rattlesnake decreased, robosquirrel increased its rate of tail flagging. The rates of tail flagging were based on previous field observations.

==== Field RoboSquirrels ====
===== First Version =====
The first version of the field robosquirrel was a modification of the laboratory robosquirrel. The heating system of laboratory robosquirrel was repackaged in a toolbox for easy transportation and a Duracell Power-pack inverter provided power for the heaters and thermostats. Instead of using a desktop computer to process images and control tail flagging, an 8-b radio controller allowed a remote control to be used instead.

Testing of robosquirrel was conducted at the Santa Margarita Ecological Reserve (SMER) near Fallbrook, California, operated by San Diego State University. Six red diamond rattlesnakes (Crotalus ruber) were radio tagged for the study. For test trials, one observer positioned robosquirrel and controlled its tail flagging, while another observer monitored the rattlesnake’s response to robosquirrel.

The researchers, however, ran into problems. First, the outdoor robosquirrel was heavy and difficult to transport, requiring two or three people to carry it. Robosquirrel had to be moved across rough terrain and, at the same time, the researchers had to watch out for venomous snakes, tarantulas, and mountain lions. Second, rattlesnakes located themselves in a variety of ambush sites. Each site presented different challenges in setting up robosquirrel. The researchers concluded that they had to redesign robosquirrel to be less complicated to set up for each new habitat.

===== Second Version =====
To redesign a more field-usable robosquirrel, custom electronics were developed to reduce bulk and weight. In addition to previous features, new features were added such as onboard cameras and data logging. To reduce weight, all power sources were placed in a small box underneath robosquirrel.

The new robosquirrel design used an ATmega128 microprocessor with 4 kB of data memory and 128 kB of program memory. The microprocessor was mounted on a custom designed, two-layer printed circuit board with a DB9 serial port for RS-232 communication and an SD card slot for data storage. The circuit board also had a JTAG port for programming and radio control hardware. The main program ran in a loop that repeatedly checked for input from the remote control.

Nichrome heating elements were controlled by pulse-width modulation (PWM) of transistors. Tail flagging was controlled by a 16-b counter in fast-PWM compare-match mode connected to the same Hitec servo. For this version of robosquirrel, the tail servo was mounted inside robosquirrel, allowing more realistic tail-flagging. A premade receiver–transmitter kit Radio allowed user control of robosquirrel. A camera allowed for positioning of robosquirrel relative to a rattlesnake and for monitoring of a snake.

Robosquirrel was deployed at Camp Ohlone in the Sunol Regional Park in Sunol, California. This site was selected because it has large populations of ground squirrels and rattlesnakes. Seventeen snakes were captured and radio tagged so that they could be tracked. Initial results with the new robosquirrel indicated that rattlesnakes abandon their ambush sites more quickly when robosquirrel tail-flagged than when it did not as predicted.

== Controversy ==
=== Wastebook ===
In 2008, Senator Tom Coburn began releasing reports of what he considers wasteful federal spending. The first report was released on December 11, 2008. On December 12, 2010, Senator Coburn released the first report entitled "Wastebook 2010: A Guide to Some of the Most Wasteful Government Spending of 2010.” On October 16, 2012, Wastebook 2012 was released listing 100 instances in which over spending is claimed (note the table of contents only lists 10). The Robosquirrel project is seventh on the list.

Senator Coburn's Wastebook series has been lauded as important tool for detecting wasteful federal spending and as guide for how to cut the U.S. deficit. Critics have argued that the projects listed in the Wastebook series were not reviewed by experts before inclusion, that there are many mistakes in Wastebook, and that the Wastebook series is especially critical of scientific research.

=== When robot squirrels attack – (CA) $325,000 ===
Senator Tom Colburn's Wastebook 2012 listed robosquirrel as an example of wasteful government spending:

In this corner with a triangular-shaped head, a rattle on its tail, with a venomous bite is the rattlesnake.

And in the other corner, whistling and chirping, covered in fur with a bushy tail, is the squirrel.

These two critters are long-time adversaries. Squirrels are frequently preyed upon by the rattlesnakes, but the snakes rarely attack squirrels who are wagging their tales. When they do, they usually miss the fast moving squirrel.

But what happens when a snake is confronted by a robot squirrel, built to look, act, and even smell like the real thing?

Researchers at San Diego State University and the University of California (Davis) spent a portion of a $325,000 National Science Foundation (NSF) grant to construct a robotic squirrel named “RoboSquirrel” to answer that question….

During these difficult fiscal times of massive deficits, paying $325,000 for a robot squirrel seems a bit squirrelly. (pp. 20–21)

The robosquirrel project was one of 10 projects listed in his October 15, 2012 press release, but it was singled out by many major news outlets as illustrated by the titles of news articles (e.g., "Robo-squirrel, video game on government pork list" in USA Today).

=== Response to criticism ===
The main response to Senator Coburn's criticism that "During these difficult fiscal times of massive deficits, paying $325,000 for a robot squirrel seems a bit squirrelly" is that the robosquirrel (i.e., second field version) in question cost only a few hundred dollars. Most of the funding has gone toward the education of future scientists and engineers. The science and engineering in the project furthers the advancement of biorobotics and the study of animal behavior and its evolution by building on previous research using biorobotics in animal behavior research.

==== Use of federal funds ====
On July 1, 2010 (the estimated end date is June 30, 2014), the National Science Foundation began funding a research proposal by Rulon Clark (San Diego State University) and Sanjay Joshi (University of California, Davis) entitled "Understanding predator-prey signaling interactions: the dynamics of antisnake displays in ground squirrels and kangaroo rats." They proposed to investigate the function and evolution of animal communication between predators and prey using robots that can interact with predators. They also stated in their proposal that their research project would support and provide training for future scientists and engineers.

==== Accounting of federal funds ====
The researchers reported that they were awarded $390,000 for a 4-year study in 2010 by NSF. Their universities take about one third of the funds in indirect costs, which go for overhead, for example, to building maintenance, energy costs, and scholarships for students. This leaves approximately $260,000 over four years for the research project itself. Most of these funds go towards supporting biology and engineering students who help conduct the proposed research. They estimate that of the direct and indirect budget categories in their NSF grant, nearly $273,000 or 70% of the total funds go to training and support for students. They report that 34 students have received training so far in this research project. They also report that of the funds awarded by NSF, $13,700 has or will be spent on biorobotics over the four years of this study, which is 3.5% of the total funds.
