= Ohlone Wilderness =

Regional park in United States

Coordinates: 37°30′32.56″N 121°52′2.6″W

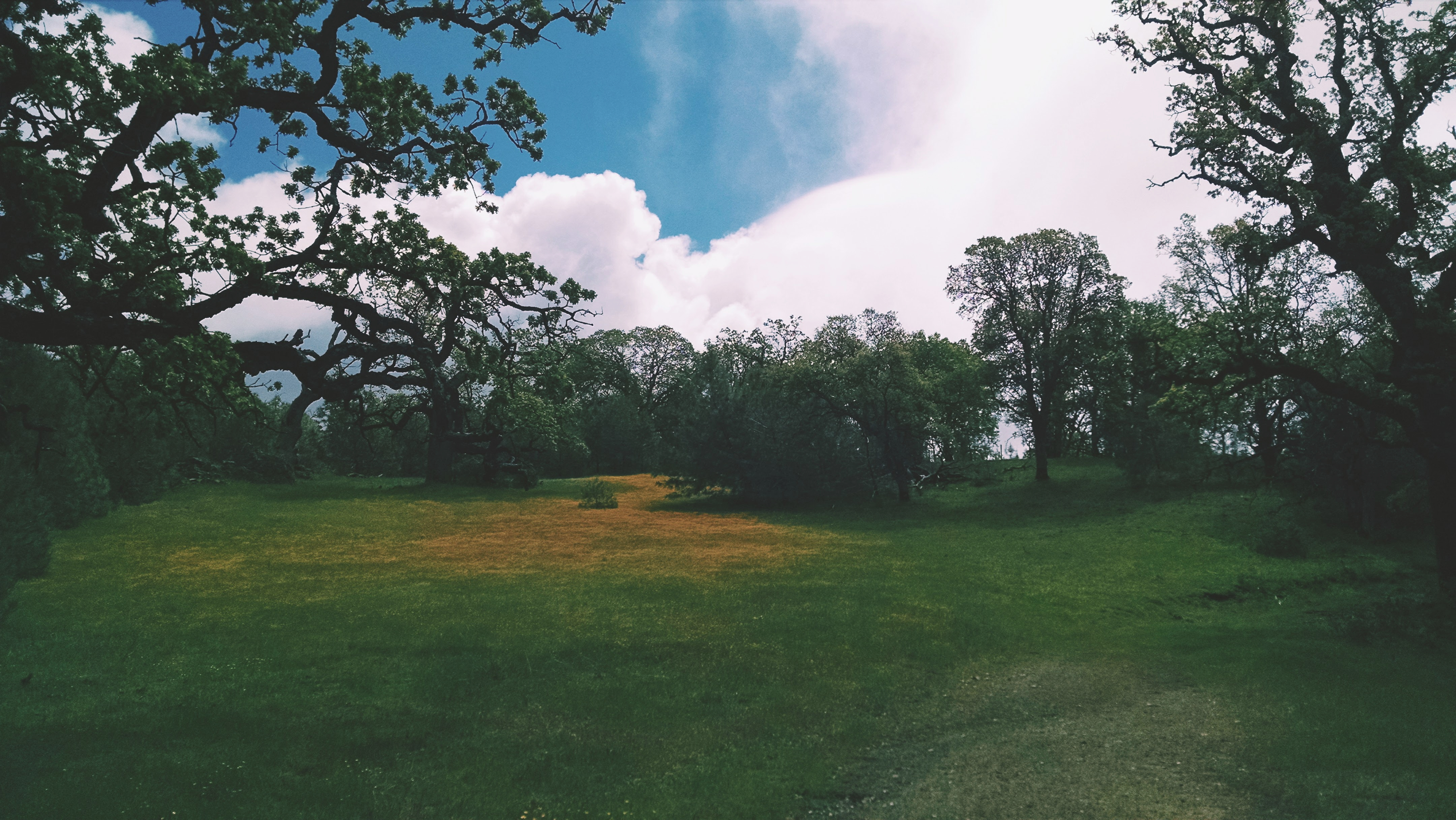
- Scene on Ohlone Wilderness Trail; April 26, 2016
- Interactive map of Ohlone Wilderness
- Location: Alameda County, California
- Nearest city: Fremont, California
- Area: 9,737 acres (39.40 km^{2})
- Operator: East Bay Regional Park District
- Open: 1962

Ohlone Wilderness is a 9,737 acres (39.40 km^{2}) regional park in the United States that is part of the East Bay Regional Parks (EBRPD) system. It is located in southern Alameda County, near the cities of Fremont, California and Sunol, California. It is located between Mission Peak (to its west) and Sunol Regional Wilderness (to its east).

== Access ==
The wilderness is accessible only via the 29 miles (47,000 m) long Ohlone Wilderness Trail, which connects Del Valle Regional Park (Livermore), Sunol Regional Wilderness (Sunol) and Mission Peak Regional Preserve (Fremont).

The wilderness can be traversed only on foot or on horseback. EBRPD states that trail bicycles and motor vehicles are not allowed.

The Ohlone Wilderness Trail passes through two areas that belong to the San Francisco Water Department. Trail users are warned that they must remain within the trail boundaries in these areas. Otherwise, they may be cited and fined for trespassing on SFWD property and potentially jeopardize public use of the corridors.

== History ==
Sunol-Ohlone Regional Wilderness, the predecessor to both Sunol and Ohlone Wildernesses, was opened in 1962 with an area of 6,858 acres (27.75 km^{2}). For generations, the land had been inhabited by Chochenyo language Ohlone-speaking Taunans. The first white settlers, Patrick and Mary Ann Geary, started a homestead here in the 1860s. In 1895, their son, Maurice Geary, built the house and barn that later became the Interpretive Offices and the Green Barn Visitors Center. The property was acquired by Willis Brinker in 1939.
