= Thomas A. Rymer =

American politician (1925–2016)

Judge of the Calvert County Circuit Court
- In office 1987–1995

Member of the Maryland House of Delegates from the 29A district
- In office 1983–1988
- Preceded by: district established
- Succeeded by: George W. Owings III

Member of the Maryland House of Delegates from the 30A district
- In office 1975–1982
- Preceded by: district established
- Succeeded by: districts merged

Member of the Maryland House of Delegates
- In office 1971–1974
- Preceded by: Arthur W. Dowell Jr.
- Succeeded by: legislative districts established
- Constituency: Calvert County, Maryland

State's attorney of Calvert County
- In office 1966–1970

Personal details
- Born: Thomas Arrington Rymer; February 10, 1925 Asheville, North Carolina, U.S.
- Died: April 15, 2016 (aged 91)
- Party: Democratic
- Spouse(s): Louise Carpenter Grace Mead Garrett (m. 1977)
- Children: 3
- Education: University of Maryland
- Alma mater: Cornell University (BCE); George Washington University Law School (JD)

Military service
- Allegiance: United States
- Branch/service: United States Navy
- Rank: Lieutenant (junior grade)
- Battles/wars: World War II

Thomas A. Rymer (February 10, 1925 – April 15, 2016) was an American politician and judge. He served in the Maryland House of Delegates, representing Calvert County from 1971 to 1974, District 30A from 1975 to 1982 and District 29A from 1983 to 1988. Rymer also served as judge of the Calvert County Circuit Court from 1987 to 1995 and as state's attorney of Calvert County from 1966 to 1970.

== Early life ==
Thomas Arrington Rymer was born on February 10, 1925, in Asheville, North Carolina. Rymer and his family moved to Washington, D.C., in 1939. He attended Western High School in Washington, D.C. Rymer then attended the University of Maryland and joined the V-12 Navy College Training Program. Rymer graduated from Cornell University in 1948 with a Bachelor of Civil Engineering. He then graduated from George Washington University Law School with a J.D. in 1955. He was admitted to the bar in Maryland in 1958.

== Career ==
Rymer served in the U.S. Navy during World War II. He enlisted as an ensign and became a lieutenant (junior grade). After the military, he worked in engineering and construction positions, including as an engineer for Washington Suburban Sanitary Commission and designing and building houses in Montgomery County. Rymer worked in government positions in the Army, Navy, and the U.S. Secretary of Defense's office. In 1964, he became the director of the Air Force Military Construction Program.

Rymer began practicing law in Prince Frederick in 1964. Rymer was elected as the state's attorney for Calvert County in 1966 and served in that role until 1970. He also served as an attorney for North Beach and the Calvert County Board of Education.

Rymer was a member of the Maryland House of Delegates from 1971 to 1988, representing Calvert County from 1971 to 1974, District 30A from 1975 to 1982 and District 29A from 1983 to 1988. He also served as the majority whip from 1978 to 1986. He was a Democrat.

In 1987, Rymer was appointed by Governor William Donald Schaefer as judge of the Calvert County Circuit Court. He served until his mandatory retirement date in 1995. He continued sitting on circuit and district courts in Calvert, Charles, St. Mary's and Prince George's County after his retirement. He also served in a three judge panel for the Federal Land Commission in Baltimore.

== Personal life ==
Rymer married Louise Carpenter. They had three children: Gary C. Rymer, Thomas A. Rymer Jr. and Ronald C. Rymer. Rymer married again in 1977 to Grace Mead Garrett. He died on April 15, 2016.
