= Maryland House of Delegates District 29A =

American legislative district

Maryland's legislative district 29A
- Represents part of St. Mary's County
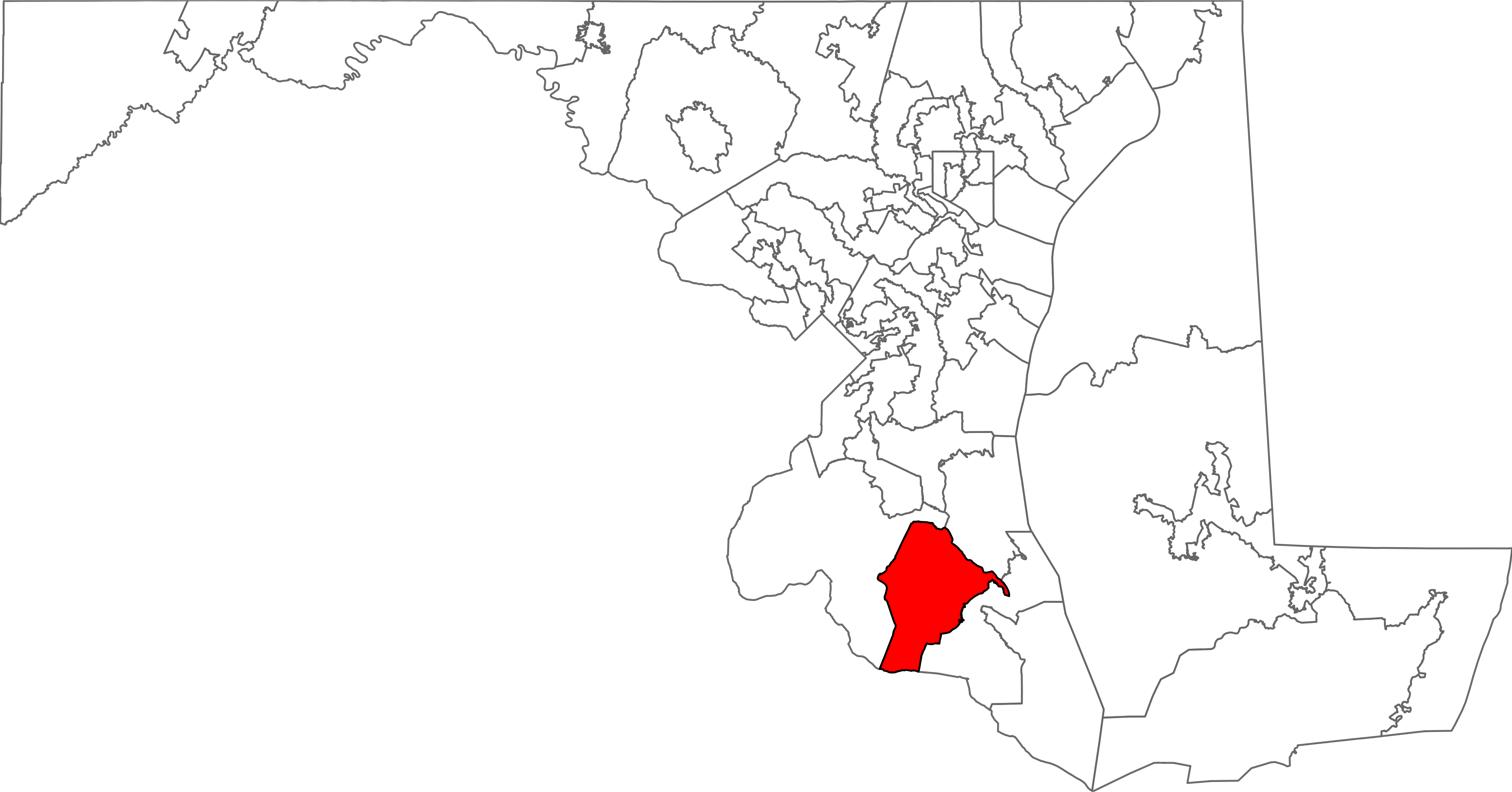
- Delegate(s): Matthew Morgan (R)
- Registration: 46.6% Republican; 32.3% Democratic; 19.9% unaffiliated
- Demographics: 82.5% White; 8.5% Black/African American; 0.4% Native American; 1.3% Asian; 0.1% Hawaiian/Pacific Islander; 0.9% Other race; 6.4% Two or more races; 3.1% Hispanic
- Population (2020): 44,929
- Voting-age population: 34,155
- Registered voters: 30,878

Maryland House of Delegates District 29A is one of the 71 districts that compose the Maryland House of Delegates. Along with subdistricts 29B and 29C, it makes up the 29th district of the Maryland Senate. District 29A includes part of St. Mary's County, and is represented by one delegate.

== Demographic characteristics ==
As of the 2020 United States census, the district had a population of 44,929, of whom 34,155 (76.0%) were of voting age. The racial makeup of the district was 37,046 (82.5%) White, 3,825 (8.5%) African American, 169 (0.4%) Native American, 578 (1.3%) Asian, 30 (0.1%) Pacific Islander, 403 (0.9%) from some other race, and 2,882 (6.4%) from two or more races. Hispanic or Latino of any race were 1,373 (3.1%) of the population.

The district had 30,878 registered voters as of October 17, 2020, of whom 6,141 (19.9%) were registered as unaffiliated, 14,376 (46.6%) were registered as Republicans, 9,966 (32.3%) were registered as Democrats, and 209 (0.7%) were registered to other parties.

== Past Election Results ==
=== 1982 ===
Name	Party	Outcome
Thomas A. Rymer	Democratic	Won

=== 1986 ===
Name	Party	Votes	Percent	Outcome
Thomas A. Rymer	Democratic	5,971	100.0%	Won

=== 1990 ===
Name	Party	Votes	Percent	Outcome
George W. Owings III	Democratic	5,709	55.0%	Won
Edward B. Finch	Republican	3,711	36.0%	Lost
William Johnston	Independent	1,012	10.0%	Lost

=== 1994 ===
Name	Party	Votes	Percent	Outcome
John F. Wood Jr.	5,739	50.0%	Democratic	Won

=== 1998 ===
Name	Party	Votes	Percent	Outcome
John F. Wood Jr.	Democratic	5,782	56.0%	Won
Shane Mattingly	Republican	4,584	44.0%	Lost

=== 2002 ===
Name	Party	Votes	Percent	Outcome
John F. Wood Jr.	Democratic	9,816	98.0%	Won
Other Write-Ins		202	2.0%	

=== 2006 ===
Name	Party	Votes	Percent	Outcome
John F. Wood Jr.	Democratic	8,695	65.2%	Won
Joe DiMarco	Republican	4,613	34.6%	Lost
Other Write-Ins		20	0.2%	

=== 2010 ===
Name	Party	Votes	Percent	Outcome
John F. Wood Jr.	Democratic	7,379	50.9%	Won
Matthew Morgan	Republican	7,096	49.0%	Lost
Other Write-Ins		9	0.1%	

=== 2014 ===
Name	Party	Votes	Percent	Outcome
Matthew Morgan	Republican	8,948	64.8%	Won
Daniel A.M. Slade	Democratic	4,840	35.1%	Lost
Other Write-Ins		13	0.1%	

=== 2018 ===
Name	Party	Votes	Percent	Outcome
Matthew Morgan	Republican	11,471	69.0%	Won
Roberta Miles Loker	Democratic	5,145	30.9%	Lost
Other Write-Ins		12	0.1%	
