= Matthew Morgan (politician) =

American politician (born 1973)

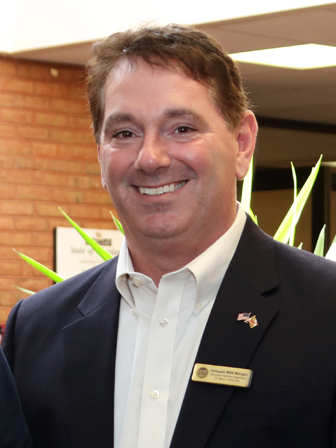

Member of the Maryland House of Delegates from the 29A district
- Incumbent
- Assumed office January 14, 2015
- Preceded by: John F. Wood Jr.

Personal details
- Born: James Matthew Morgan; February 5, 1973 (age 53) La Plata, Maryland, U.S.
- Party: Republican

James Matthew Morgan (born February 5, 1973) is an American politician who is Republican member of the Maryland House of Delegates representing District 29A, which includes the northwestern portion of St. Mary's County, since 2015.

== Early life and education ==
Morgan was born on February 5, 1973, in La Plata, Maryland. He graduated from Maurice J. McDonough High School in nearby Pomfret, Maryland.

== In the legislature ==
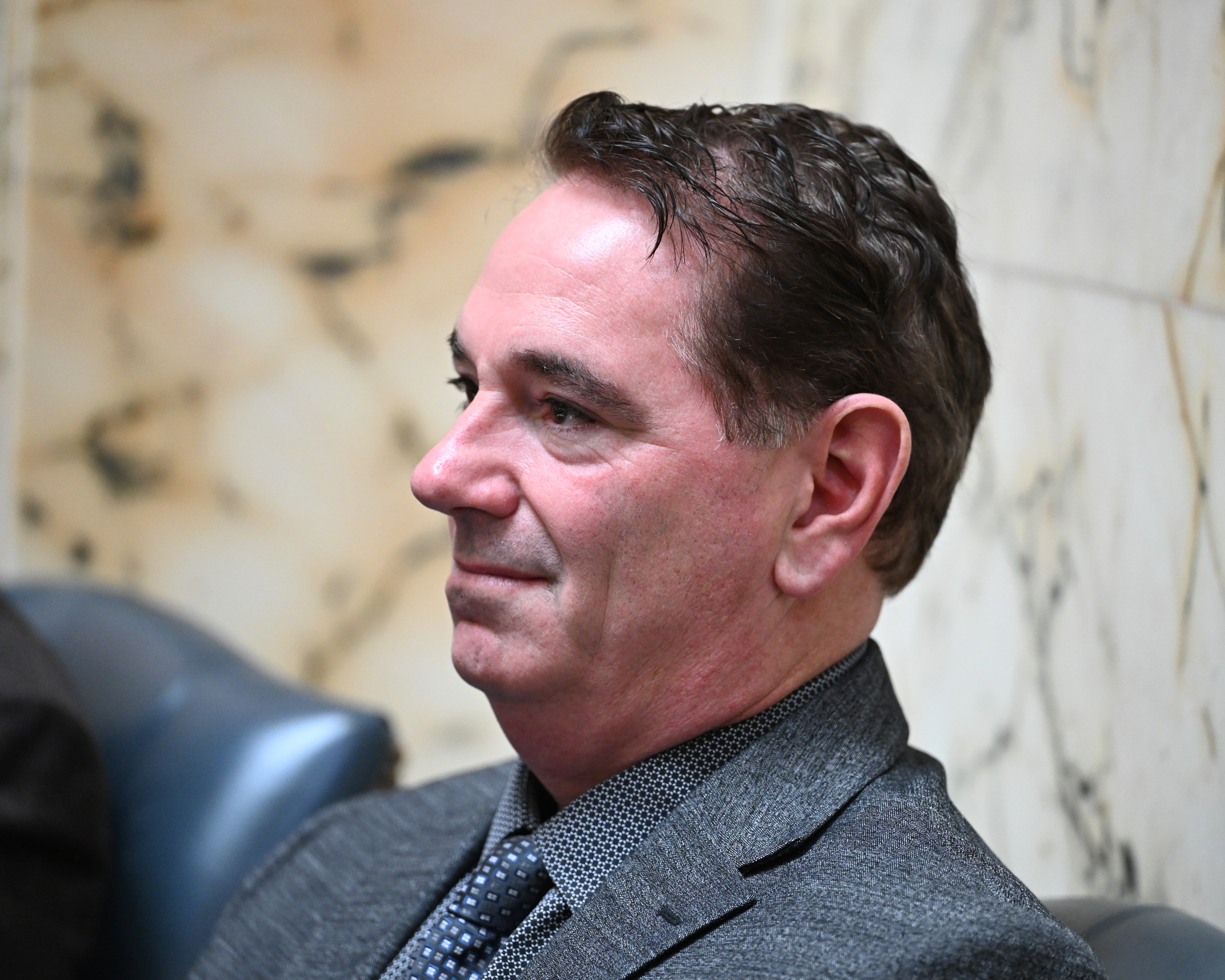
Morgan on the House floor, 2026

Morgan was sworn into the Maryland House of Delegates on January 14, 2015, and has served as a member of the Health and Government Operations Committee during his entire tenure. From 2019 to 2021, he served as the Assistant Minority Leader of the House of Delegates. Morgan is also a member of the Maryland Freedom Caucus, serving as its inaugural chair in 2025.

In 2021, Morgan ran for Minority Leader of the House of Delegates on a ticket with Delegate Mark N. Fisher. The Adams-Morgan ticket was defeated by Jason C. Buckel and Haven Shoemaker by a "more than a 2–1 margin".

== Political positions ==
=== Education ===
In April 2023, Morgan sent a letter to State Superintendent Mohammed Choudhury accusing the Maryland State Department of Education of hiding scores from failing scores by altering data files available on the department's website. An investigation conducted by the state inspector general found no evidence of these claims.

=== Electoral reform ===
In 2015, Morgan joined Neil Parrott in filing a lawsuit challenging the state's congressional districts.

During the 2021 legislative session, Morgan opposed a bill that would require elections for county commissioners to only be decided by voters within the districts in which the candidate is running. During debate on the legislation, he introduced an amendment that would impose the same rules on school board districts, which was rejected by a 45–93 vote. The bill later passed the House of Delegates by a vote of 95-39. He also opposed legislation that would send a mail-in ballot to every registered voter in both the state's primary and general elections.

In September 2025, Morgan spoke at a rally in support of the Safeguard American Voter Eligibility Act, during which he compared requiring an ID to vote to an ID requirement imposed in Charles County to attend the county fair.

During the 2026 legislative session, he supported bills that would require voter ID and proof of citizenship to vote in Maryland elections, as well as restrictions on postal voting. Morgan also opposed efforts to redraw Maryland's congressional districts and voted against bills to allow Maryland to continue tabulating mail-in ballots after Election Day amid Supreme Court arguments in Watson v. Republican National Committee and the Maryland Voting Rights Act.

=== Energy ===
During the 2026 legislative session, Morgan supported bills to withdraw Maryland from the Regional Greenhouse Gas Initiative, repeal the EmPOWER program, and place economic safeguards on the state's climate mandates. He voted against the Utility RELIEF Act.

=== Gun control ===
Following a March 2018 school shooting at Great Mills High School, located within Morgan's district, Morgan responded with pessimism that proposed gun control legislation would be effective in preventing future shootings, saying "I don't know if there is a policy fix." During the 2019 legislative session, Morgan introduced legislation to give local school systems the ability to station police officers at every school within its jurisdiction.

=== Healthcare ===
Morgan opposed a 2019 bill to create a Prescription Drug Affordability Board to negotiate the prices of prescription drugs, expressing concern that the board would lead to shortages of life-saving medications. In July 2025, he supported provisions in the One Big Beautiful Bill Act to add stricter eligibility requirements for Medicaid, saying that it was not "a taxpayer responsibility to provide for the able-bodied people what they should be able to provide for themselves".

During the 2026 legislative session, Morgan voted against a bill that would expand Medicaid coverage for obesity treatment and the Vax Act, which would allow the Maryland Department of Health to set its own vaccine recommendations separate from the Centers for Disease Control and Prevention.

=== Housing ===
During the 2024 legislative session, Morgan opposed bills to give tenants the right of first refusal if the property owner of their residence seeks to sell the property and another that would put rent payments in escrow if a landlord neglects life-threatening defects in a tenant's residence, saying that legislators should instead focus on passing bills to crack down on "slum tenants" instead of slumlords.

=== Immigration ===
In February 2026, during debate on a bill to prohibit counties from entering into 287(g) program agreements with U.S. Immigration and Customs Enforcement (ICE), Morgan criticized state delegate Bernice Mireku-North for stating that ICE had "become a weapon of white supremacy", saying that there was "absolutely zero proof that ICE members are white supremacists". He voted against the bill to ban 287(g) agreements, later telling Southern Maryland News that polling showed that Marylanders supported the agreements and that its abolition would not make state residents safer. He also opposed a bill that allows the attorney general of Maryland to use data collected through police surveillance methods to identify and gather evidence against a judicial officer if someone brought a complaint of wrongful conduct, referring to it as the "Maryland State Police KGB Act".

=== National politics ===
Morgan supported Donald Trump in the 2020 presidential election. He criticized Michael Steele's decision to join The Lincoln Project, saying "It definitely conflicts with where the party is as a whole." In May 2024, Morgan signed onto a letter condemning the jury's guilty verdict in the Trump hush money trial, calling the ruling a "political prosecution from a kangaroo court and left-leaning prosecutor" that is turning the U.S. justice system into a "third world parody of law and order".

In February 2025, Morgan said he supported the second presidency of Donald Trump and defended the Trump administration's mass firing of federal employees, saying that he felt losing a job "necessarily doesn't have to be a bad thing".

In August 2025, amid Republican efforts to redraw Texas's congressional districts to gain five congressional seats in the 2026 United States House of Representatives elections, Morgan suggested in a post on Twitter that states like Maryland caused Texas Republicans to redraw their congressional districts and redrawing Maryland's congressional districts to have a congressional delegation of entirely Democrats would result in "economic suicide". In January 2026, he encouraged Maryland Republicans to sign up to testify against Maryland's proposed mid-decade redistricting maps, noting that "every piece of testimony can be used for a potential lawsuit".

=== Policing ===
Following the murder of George Floyd on May 25, 2020, Morgan called Floyd's death "tragic" and indefensible" while accusing Democrats of using the incident as an "excuse to drive political narrative" and "dismantle the police departments". In April 2021, he proposed an amendment that would make top law enforcement officers in each jurisdiction elected by local members of the public.

During the 2026 legislative session, Morgan opposed a bill that would prohibit law enforcement officers from wearing face coverings, saying that lawmakers should first try to understand why ICE agents are wearing masks before trying to ban the practice.

=== Social issues ===
In March 2018, Morgan opposed legislation that would have renamed the Harry W. Nice Memorial Bridge after senator Thomas M. Middleton.

In April 2018, Morgan proposed an amendment to expand net neutrality legislation to regulate privacy policies on social media companies; the amendment was rejected over concerns that it did not fit the scope of the bill.

== Electoral history ==
Maryland House of Delegates District 29A Republican Primary Election, 2014
Party	Candidate	Votes	%
Republican	Matt Morgan	1,299	45.4
Republican	Bryan "Puff" Barthelme	845	29.5
Republican	Thomas Tommy McKay	718	25.1

Maryland House of Delegates District 29A Election, 2014
Party	Candidate	Votes	%
Republican	Matt Morgan	8,948	64.8
Democratic	Daniel A.M. Slade	4,840	35.1
Write-In		13	0.1

Maryland House of Delegates District 29A Election, 2018
Party	Candidate	Votes	%
Republican	Matt Morgan	11,471	69.0
Democratic	Roberta Miles Loker	5,145	30.9
Write-In		12	0.1
