= Del Valle Regional Park =

Part of the East Bay Regional Park District in California

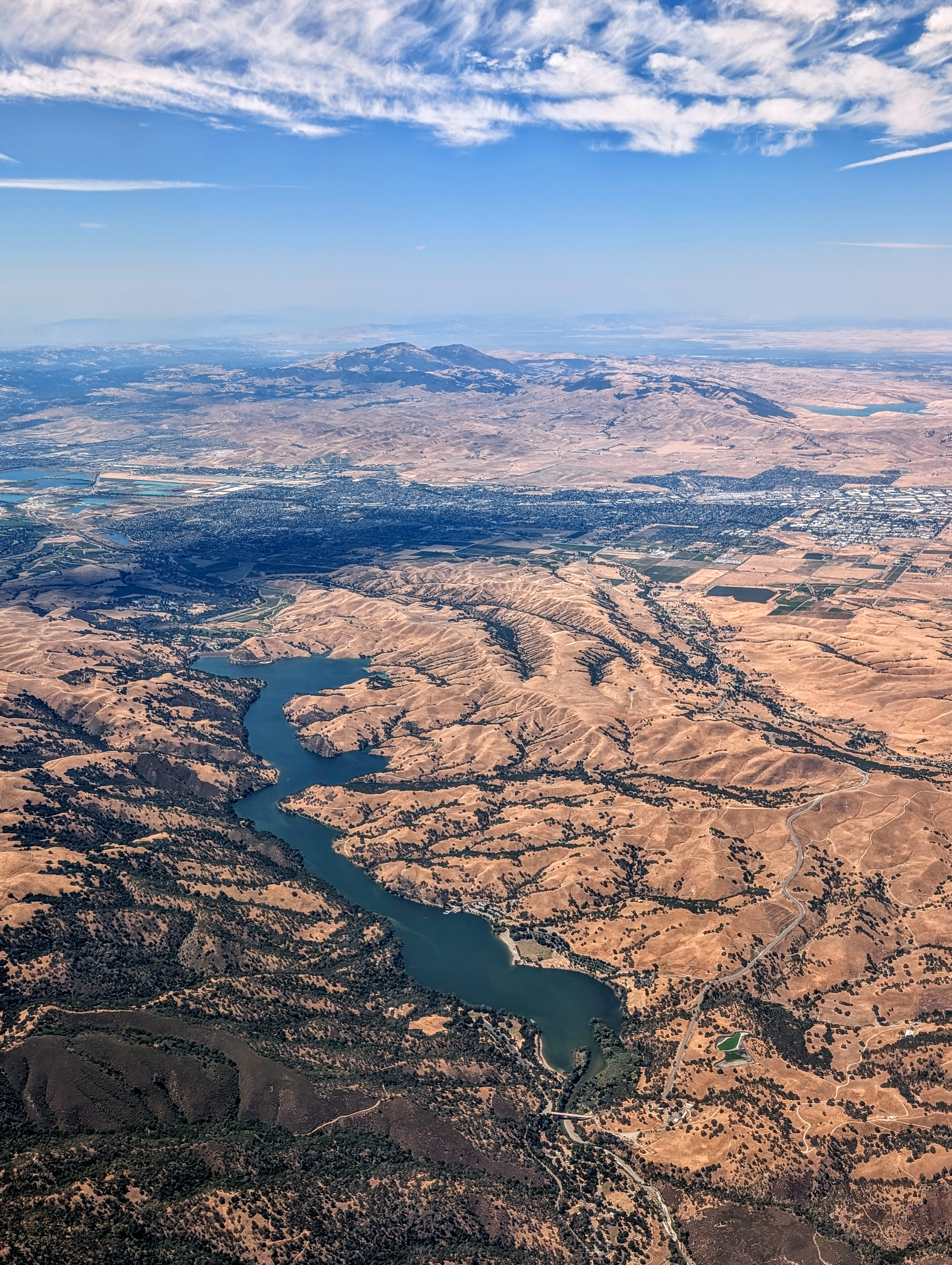
- Del Valle Regional Park and Lake
- Interactive map of Del Valle Regional Park
- Location: Alameda County, California
- Nearest city: Livermore, California
- Coordinates: 37.600564°N 121.710835°W
- Area: 4,316 acres (1,747 ha)
- Created: 1968
- Operator: East Bay Regional Park District
- Status: Open
- Website: www.ebparks.org/parks/del-valle

Del Valle Regional Park is a part of the East Bay Regional Park District (EBRPD) in an unincorporated region of Alameda County, California, 10 miles (16 km) south of the city of Livermore. The park covers 4,316 acres (~17.47 km^{2}., ~6.74 sq. mi.).

== Geography ==
=== Overview ===
The park largely surrounds Lake Del Valle, an artificial reservoir made in 1968 by damming Arroyo Valle, a small river. The lake provides a source of recreation for visitors including swimming, fishing, and boating. There are lifeguards present at designated swimming areas.

The park also offers 28 miles (~45.1 km) of hiking, horseback, and bicycle trails, in addition to 150 camping sites. It is the eastern gate for the Ohlone Wilderness Trail, which leads to Sunol and Mission Peak Regional Parks.

=== Trails ===
The park, like many East Bay Regional Parks, has numerous trails. One trail, the East Shore Trail, leads from the Arroyo Road staging area to a ridge above Del Valle, and then follows the lake for several miles toward the boat launch. The Sailor Camp Trail leads to the Ohlone Wilderness Trail, and an unnamed trail leads to Mendenhall Road. Most of the trails climb hills around the lake; most, however, stay between 500 and 1,500 feet (150 and 460 m) in elevation.

=== Access to the park ===
==== By car ====
The park can be approached from Del Valle Park Road (via Mines Road) or Arroyo Road, where the staging area is small and frequently fills up on weekends. Del Valle Road connects to the southern end of the park and has access to hiking, the swim beaches, campground, visitor center, and boat launch, while Arroyo Road connects to the northern staging area for hiking.

Mines Road can be reached from Tesla Road (J2) and the California State Route 130. L Street in Livermore becomes Arroyo Road, it can be reached from Concannon Boulevard and Wetmore Road.

==== By foot ====
You can reach the Arroyo staging area along a narrow footpath which connects to Sycamore Grove Park and the general LARPD (Livermore Area Recreation and Park District) trail network.

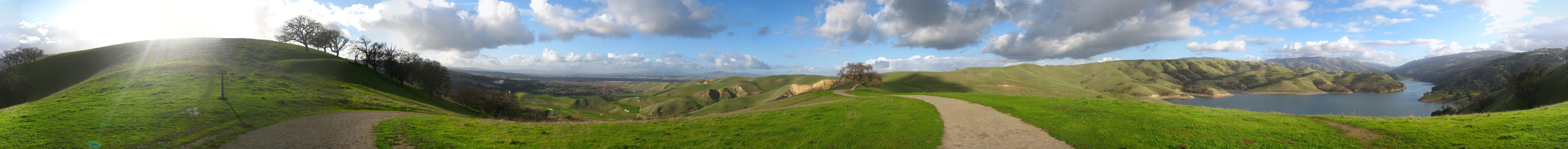
panoramic view at Del Valle Regional Park near Livermore

== History ==
=== Early years ===
Construction crews began work on the lake in 1966. The construction of Del Valle Reservoir was finished in 1968. Del Valle Regional Park was opened to the public in 1970, 36 years after the EBRPD was founded in 1934.

=== Weather ===
==== California drought in the 2010s ====
In the early- to mid-2010s, a severe drought struck the California region, including the East Bay; this caused 12 million trees in California to die. The East Bay Regional Park District wrote an article to help with the drought.

==== Flooding in the 2016–2017 winter ====
Shortly after the California drought in the 2010s, Del Valle Regional Park suffered widespread damage from the unusually heavy rains and La Niña that struck the East Bay in early 2017. Much of the damage was around Lake Del Valle, where runoff overflowed five times into beaches, campgrounds and picnic areas. Some of the trails were washed out and needed to be rebuilt. The park was closed for nearly three months, before reopening on April 15, 2017. EBRPD estimated the cost to repair this park alone at $1.8 billion, and said the cost would rise further if the rains continued.

With another La Niña scheduled for the 2017-2018 winter, it seemed quite possible that repairs would have to be done after that winter as well.

==== 2019 flooding ====
In early 2019, heavy rains again came to the Del Valle Regional Park area, and as a result, the park closed in mid-February 2019. It was scheduled to re-open in early March.

=== Algae ===
Lake Del Valle, along with many other East Bay reginal parks, has a problem with blue-green algae. During the 2015/2016 winter, swimming was banned in the lake due to the algae.

== Gallery ==
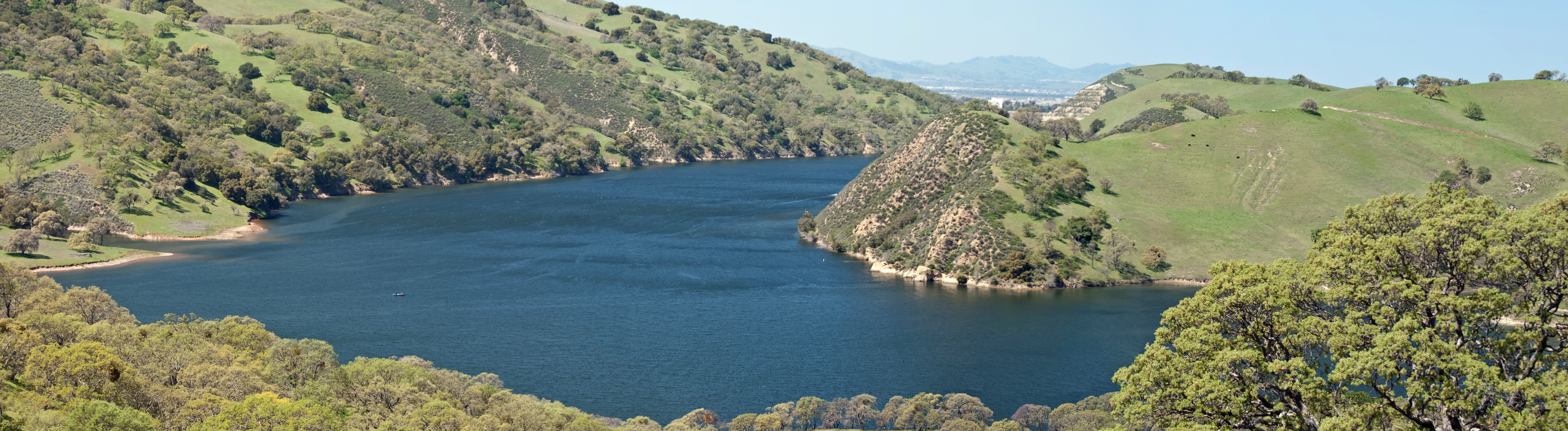
Lake Del Valle reservoir, within Del Valle Regional Park in the Diablo Range, Alameda County, San Francisco Bay Area, California.

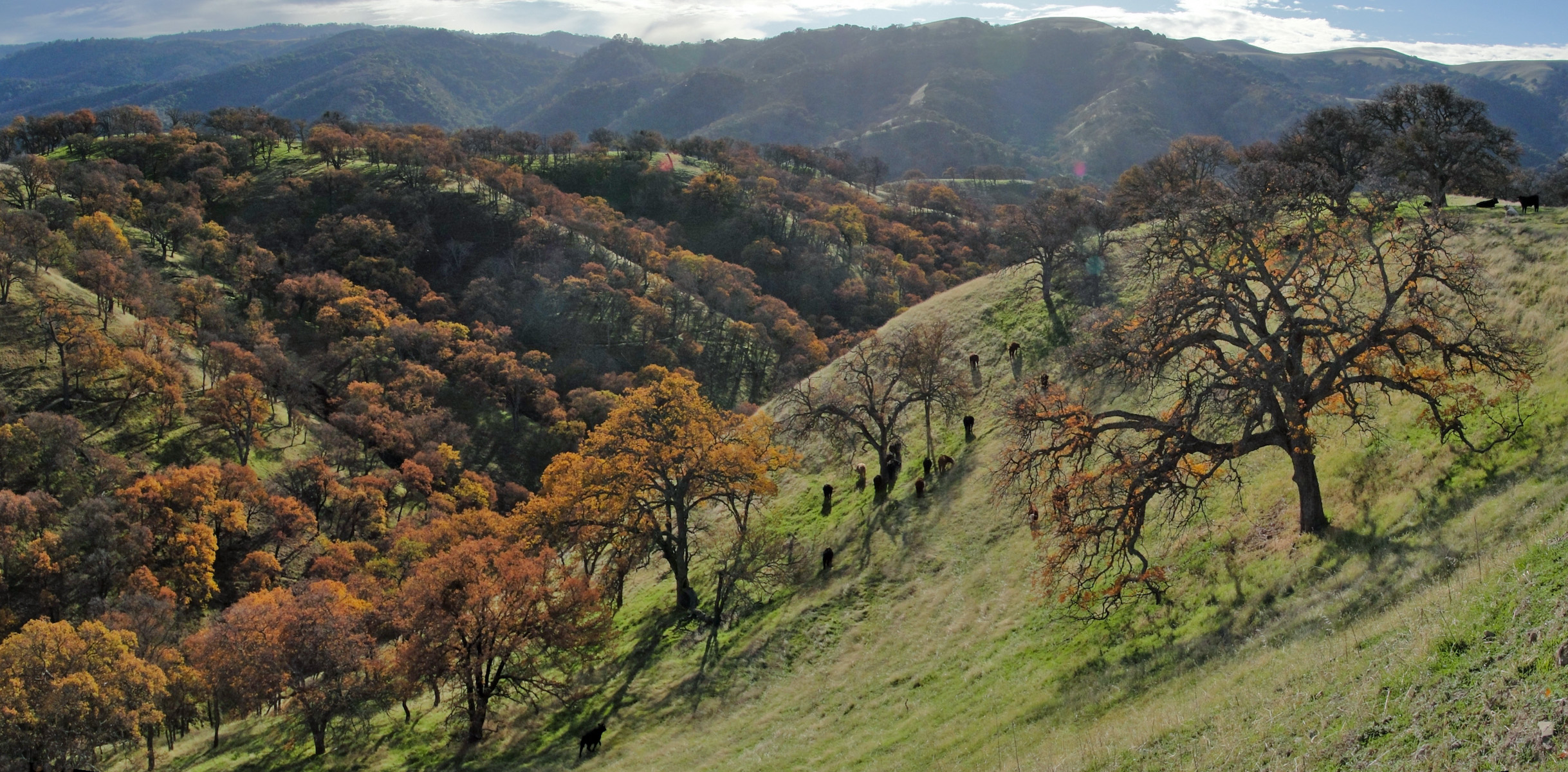
Del Valle Regional Park - Eagle Crest Trail

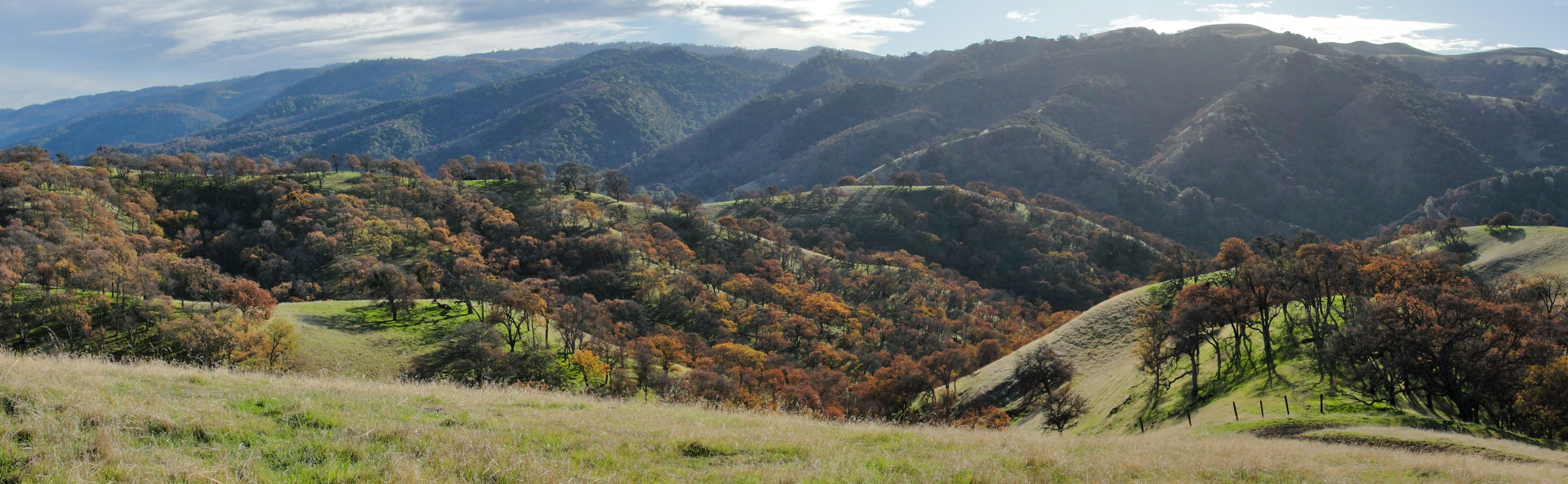
Del Valle Regional Park - Eagle Crest Trail

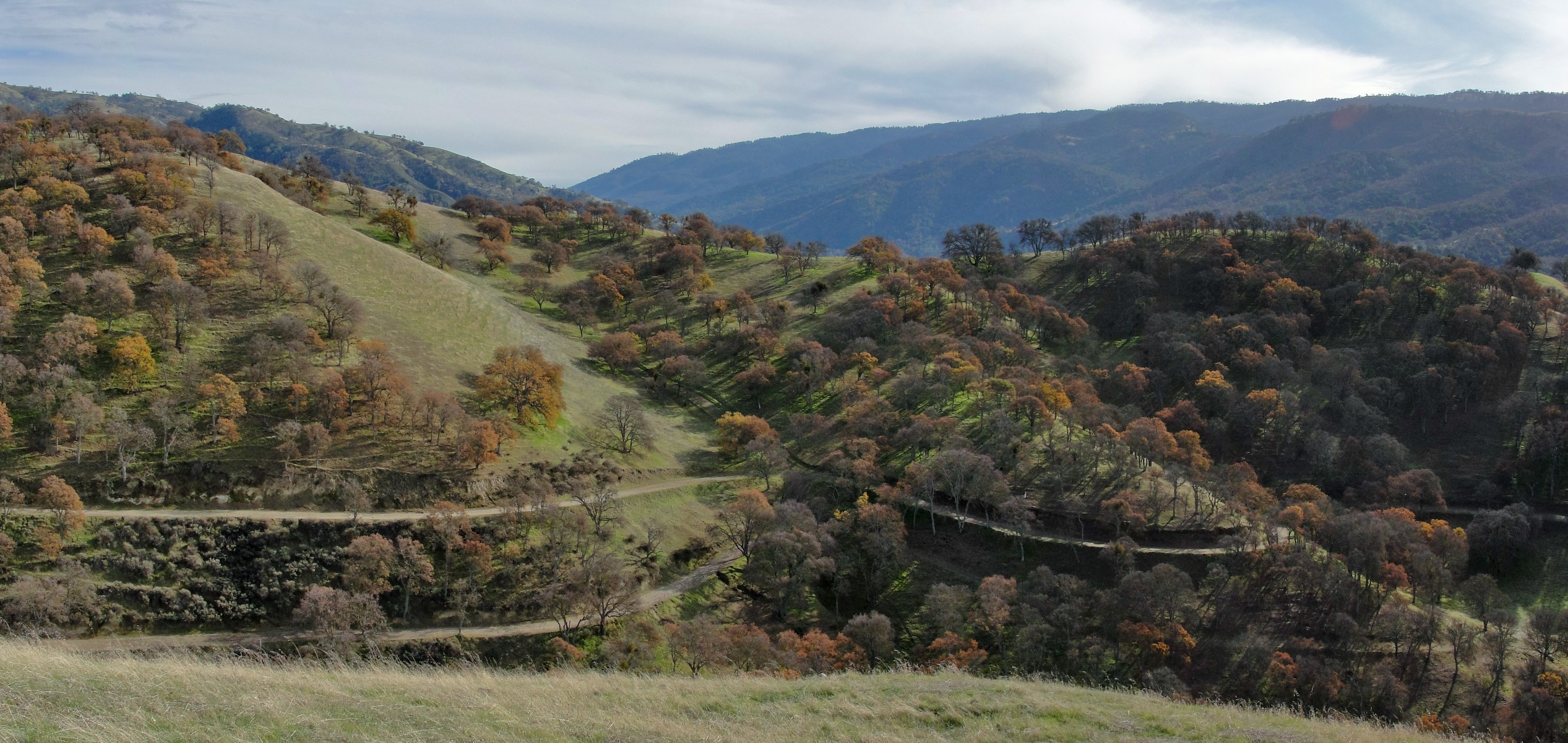
Del Valle Regional Park - Ridgeline Trail

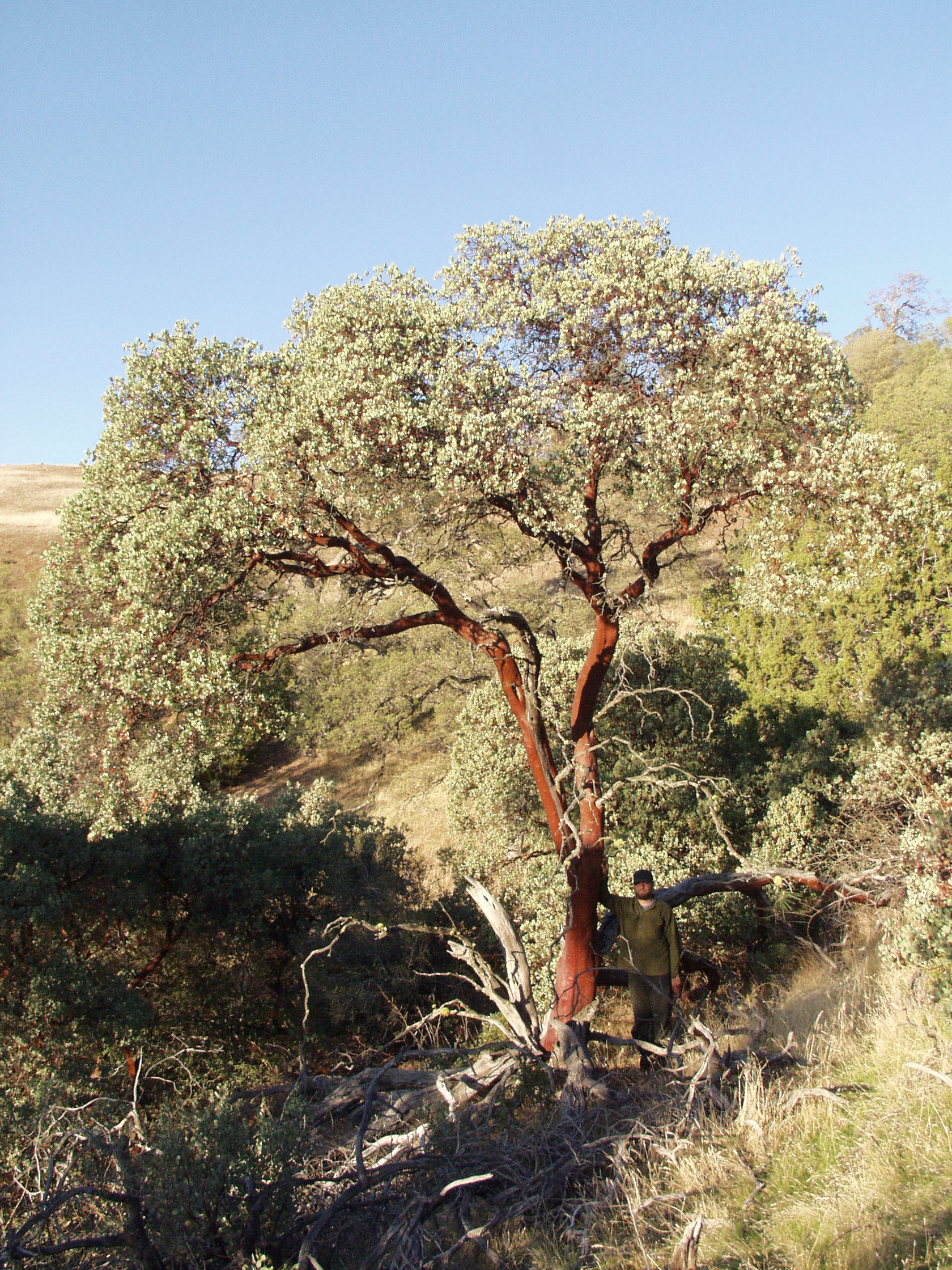
Del Valle Regional Park - Cedar Mountain
Arctostaphylos glauca — bigberry manzanita

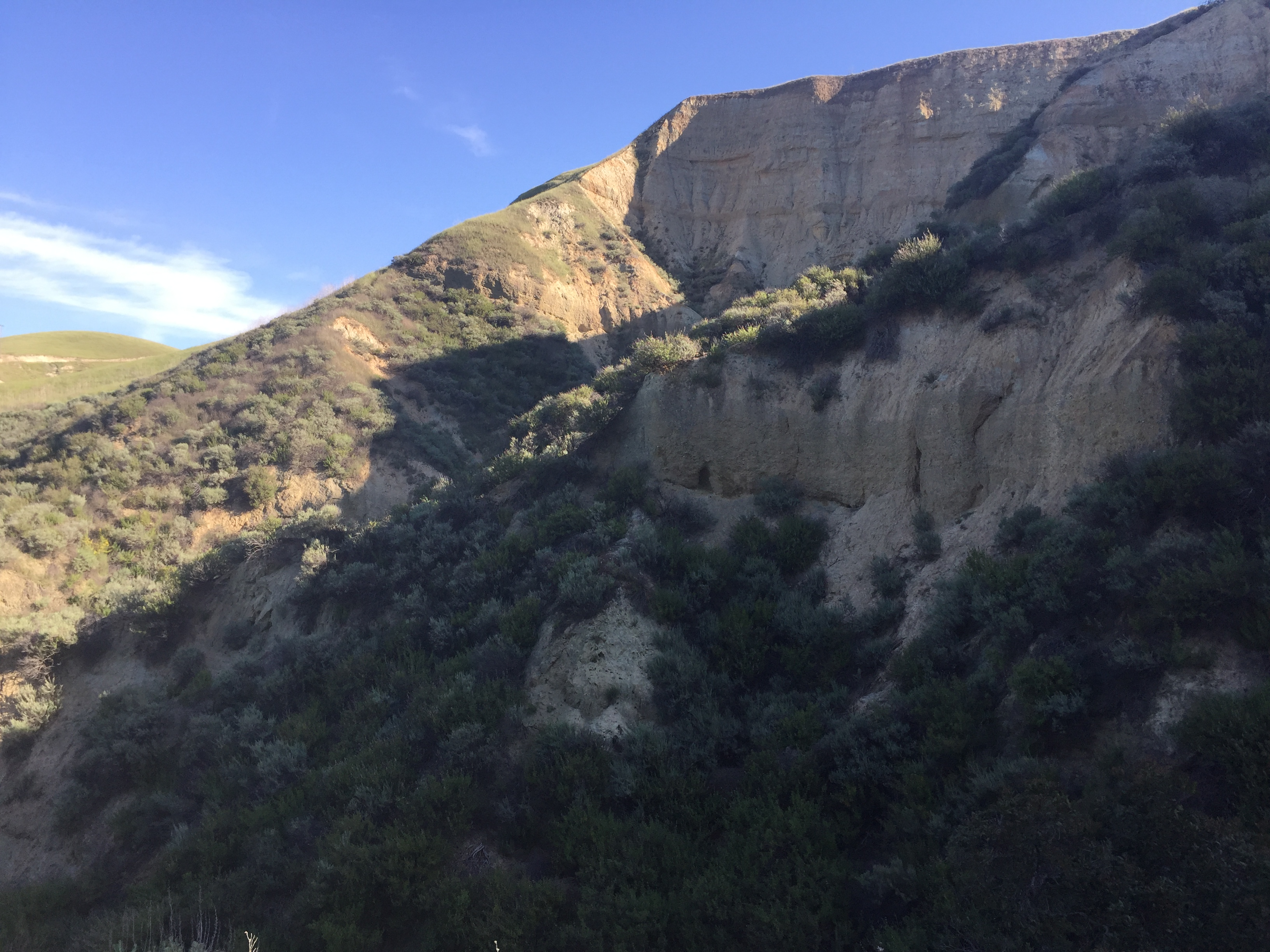
Cliffs at the northern end of Del Valle Regional Park

== See also ==
- Lake Del Valle
