= Tony Woods =

Tony Woods may refer to:

- Tony Woods (American football, born 1965), American football linebacker in the National Football League
- Tony Woods (gridiron football, born 1966), American football defensive lineman
- Tony Woods (Australian footballer) (born 1969), Australian rules footballer in the Australian Football League
- Tony Woods (basketball), (born 1990), American basketball player
- Tony Woods (comedian), American comedian

== See also ==
- Anthony Woods (born 1980), United States Army soldier discharged for violating the military's "Don't ask, don't tell" policy
- Anthony Woods (American football), American football player
- Tony Wood (disambiguation)
