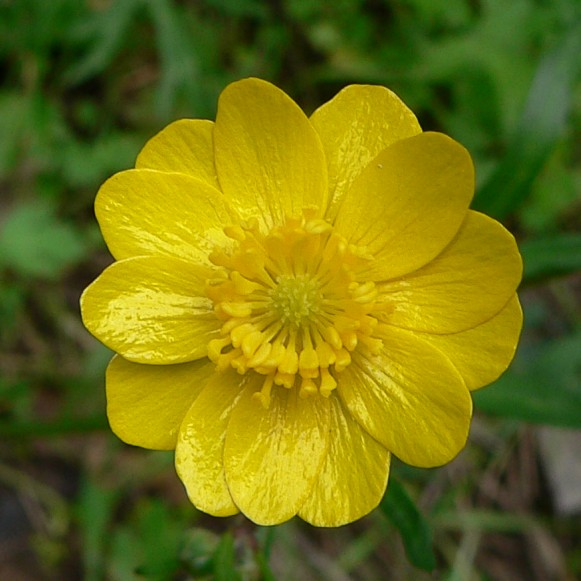

Scientific classification
- Kingdom: Plantae
- Clade: Tracheophytes
- Clade: Angiosperms
- Clade: Eudicots
- Order: Ranunculales
- Family: Ranunculaceae
- Genus: Ranunculus
- Species: R. californicus

Binomial name
- Ranunculus californicus Benth.

= Ranunculus californicus =

California buttercup

Species of buttercup

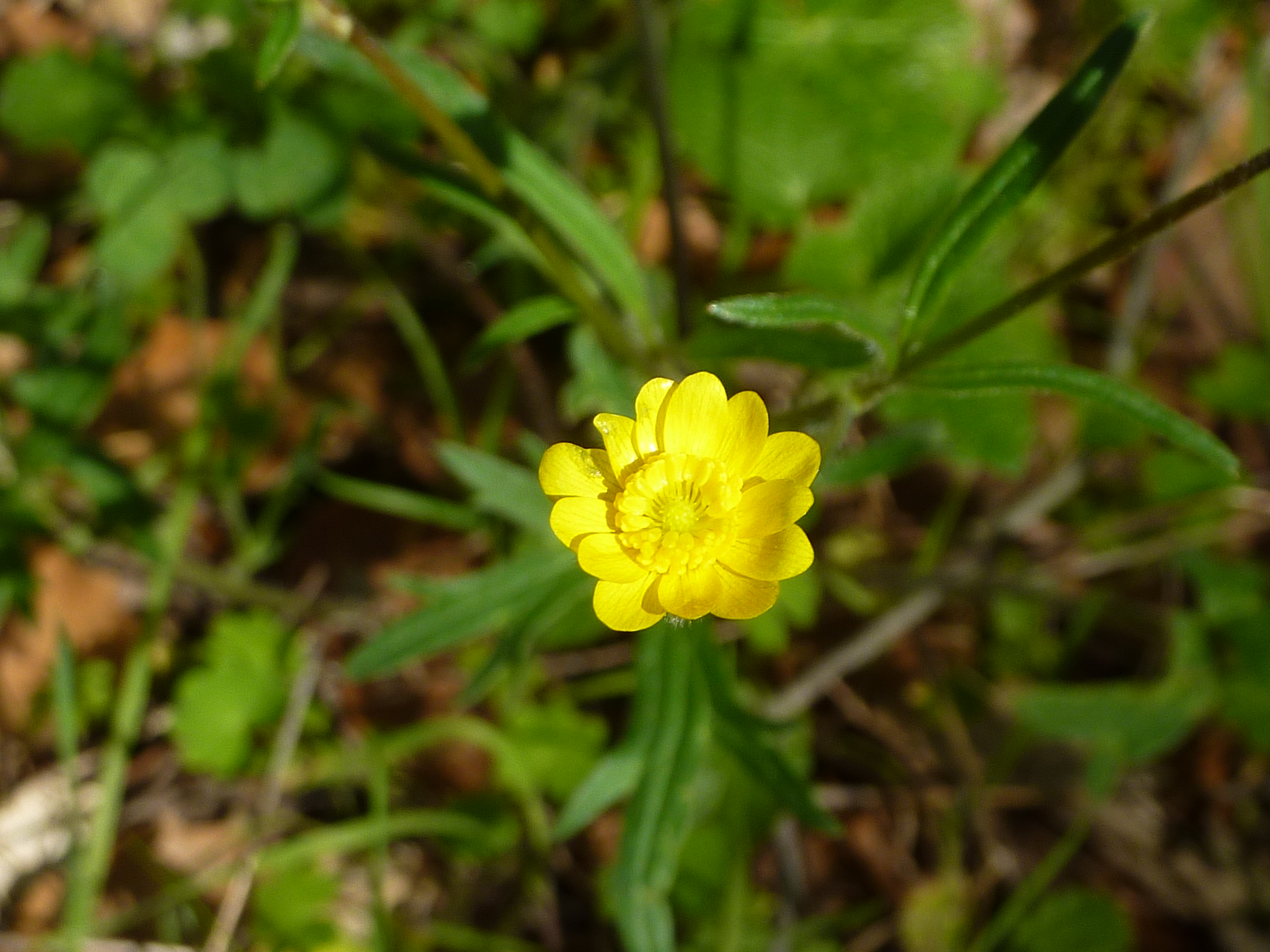
California buttercup (Ranunculus californicus) in Sunol Regional Wilderness, northern California.

Ranunculus californicus, commonly known as the California buttercup, is a flowering plant of the buttercup family Ranunculaceae. It is a native of California, where it is common in many habitats, including chaparral and woodlands.

Its distribution extends across many habitats of California, north into Oregon and south into Baja California. Its reported locations include the islands between British Columbia and Washington, the Channel Islands of California, and the Sierra Nevada.

== Description ==
Ranunculus californicus grows up to 70 centimetres (2.3 ft) in height. The bright yellow flower is roughly 1–2 centimetres (0.033–0.066 ft) in diameter and has 7 to 22 shiny, teardrop-shaped petals. Each flower grows on a long, green, leafless stem.

Varieties

- Ranunculus californicus var. californicus
- Ranunculus californicus var. cuneatus

== Cultivation ==
Ranunculus californicus is cultivated as an ornamental plant, for use in native plant gardens.

== See also ==
- List of California native plants
