= Maryland Department of Veterans and Military Families =

The Maryland Department of Veterans and Military Families (DVMF) is a state executive agency responsible for providing services, benefits assistance, and advocacy for veterans, active duty service members, and their families in Maryland. Established in its current form in 2024, the department's origins trace back to the 1924 creation of the Soldiers' Relief Fund Commission.

== History ==
The agency’s lineage traces back to the Soldiers' Relief Fund Commission, which was created in 1924 to administer a state relief fund for disabled World War I veterans (Chapter 344, Acts of 1924). In 1929, it was renamed the Veterans Relief Commission (Chapter 134, Acts of 1929). This body became the Maryland Veterans Commission in 1935 (Chapter 481, Acts of 1935). The Commission was moved to the Department of Employment and Social Services in 1971 (Chapters 370 and 617, Acts of 1971), which later became the Department of Human Resources in 1975. In 1977, the Commission became an independent agency (Chapter 895, Acts of 1977).

In October 1999, the Maryland Veterans Commission, the Maryland Veterans Home Commission, and the War Memorial Commission were consolidated to form the Maryland Department of Veterans Affairs (Chapter 125, Acts of 1999). The Maryland Veterans Trust, a 501(c)(3) organization, was created in 2010 with authorization of the Maryland General Assembly. The Department of Veterans and Military Families was established by the Maryland General Assembly in July 2024 through Chapters 11 and 12 of the Acts of 2024.

=== List of secretaries ===
- Thomas E. Hutchins, 2003
- James A. Adkins, 2007–2009
- George W. Owings III, 2015-2023
- Anthony Woods, 2023–2025
- Ross Cohen (acting), 2025
- Ed Rothstein, 2025–2026
- James Anderson (acting), 2026–present

== Services ==
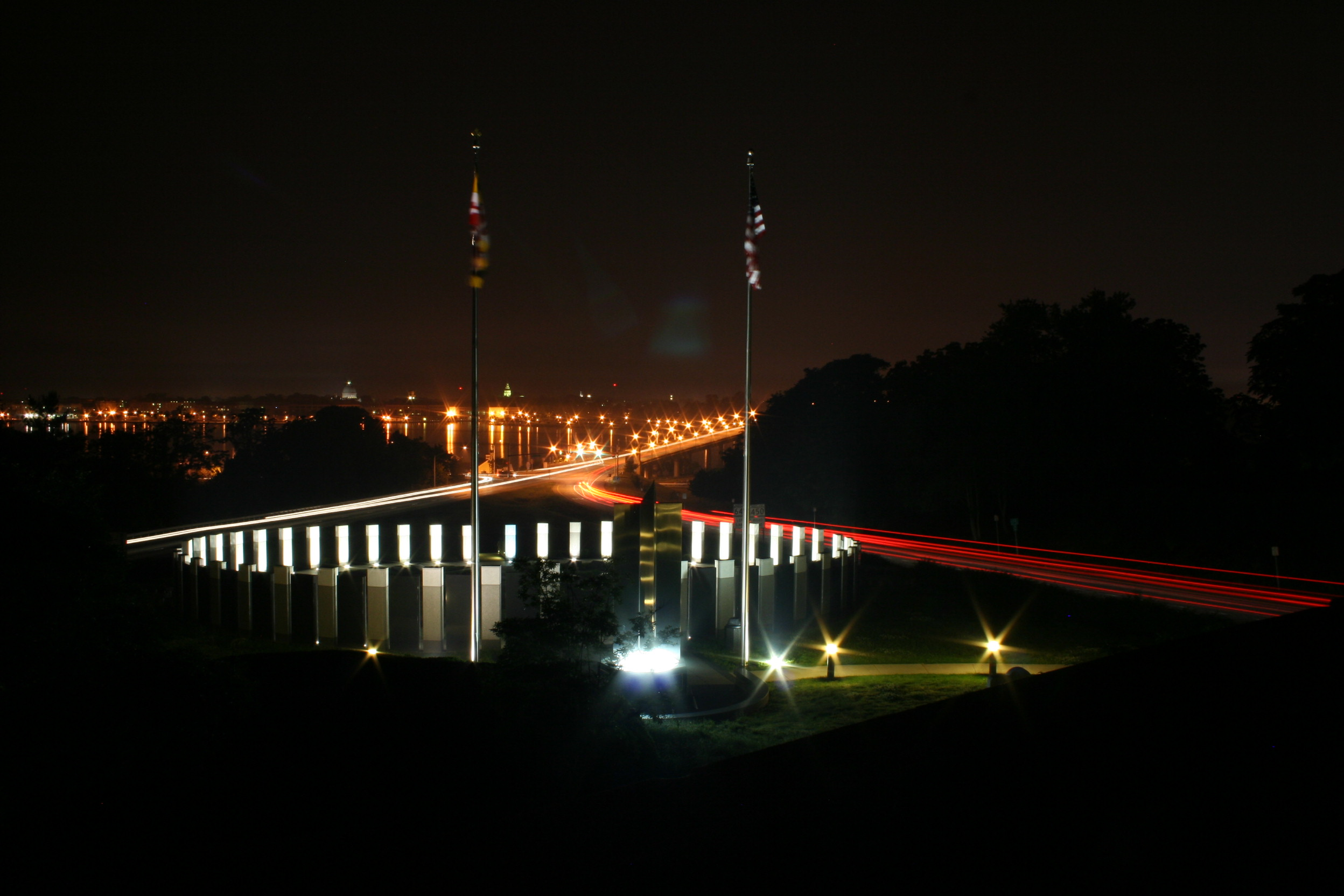
World War II Memorial, Annapolis

MDVMF provides services and programs to veterans, service members, and their families. The Service and Benefits Program assists eligible individuals in accessing benefits from the U.S. Department of Veterans Affairs, the Department of Defense, the State of Maryland, and other related agencies; this support is delivered through service officers located in communities throughout Maryland.

The department operates the Charlotte Hall Veterans Home, a facility in St. Mary's County that provides assisted living and skilled nursing care, including memory care services, across a 454-bed capacity campus. The department also oversees the Cemetery and Memorial Program, which includes five state veterans cemeteries and memorials such as the Maryland World War II Memorial in Annapolis and the Vietnam and Korean War Memorials in Baltimore; it jointly manages the War Memorial Building in Baltimore with the city. Through its Communications, Outreach, and Advocacy Program, the department engages with veterans to raise awareness of available services and solicit feedback, working in collaboration with various government and nonprofit partners. Other components of the agency include the Women Veterans and Inclusion Program, the Maryland Veterans Trust Fund, and the Office of Fair Practices.

During the 2025 United States federal mass layoffs, veterans in Maryland reported adverse impacts including job loss and service disruptions. U.S. Senator Chris Van Hollen stated that over 40,000 veterans were employed by the federal government in Maryland and that many were laid off under an executive order targeting probationary employees. According to Van Hollen, some terminated veterans received performance-related dismissal notices despite prior positive evaluations. The U.S. Department of Veterans Affairs announced plans to cut more than 70,000 workers nationwide, including positions in hospitals and benefit processing centers. In response, the MDVMF increased its outreach efforts, organizing job fairs and distributing resource guides to assist affected veterans. Denise Nooe, deputy director of the department's Communications and Outreach & Advocacy Program, stated that the agency was actively conducting outreach and coordinating employment support events.
