= Owings Mills (disambiguation) =

Owings Mills, Maryland is a suburb of Baltimore, Maryland, in the United States.

Owings Mills may also refer to:

- Owings Mills (Metro Subway station), the most northwestern stop on the Baltimore Metro Subway
- Owings Mills Town Center, a large shopping mall in Owings Mills
- Owings Mills High School, a public high school in Owings Mills
- Owings Mills Boulevard, a major road in Owings Mills
- Owings Mills New Town, an area of Owings Mills
