= George W. Owings Jr. =

American politician (died 1984)

Member of the Maryland House of Delegates from the Calvert County district
- In office 1939–1943 Serving with Louis L. Goldstein
- Preceded by: Charles Everett Hall and Herbert Ireland
- Succeeded by: John W. Hall and Maurice T. Lusby Jr.

Personal details
- Born: George William Owings Jr. June 29, 1907 Owings, Maryland, U.S.
- Died: February 2, 1984 (aged 76) Prince Frederick, Maryland, U.S.
- Resting place: Hollywood Cemetery, Richmond, Virginia, U.S.
- Party: Democratic
- Spouse: Mary Maxwell
- Children: 2, including George W. III
- Education: St. John's College
- Occupation: Politician

George William Owings Jr. (June 29, 1907 – February 2, 1984) was an American politician from Maryland. He served as a member of the Maryland House of Delegates, representing Calvert County from 1939 to 1943. He was mayor of North Beach, Maryland, from 1960 to 1962.

== Early life ==
George William Owings Jr. was born on June 29, 1907, in Owings, Maryland, to Ida (née Insley) and George W. Owings. His father was a merchant in Owings. Owings graduated St. John's College in 1929.

== Career ==
After graduating, Owings worked in oil fields in Oklahoma. He then returned home and worked with the family business and farm.

Owings was a Democrat. He served as a member of the Maryland House of Delegates, representing Calvert County from 1939 to 1943. He became the journal clerk of the House of Delegates in 1946 and became chief clerk in 1955. He served in that role until 1957. He served again in 1959. In 1958, he ran as a Democrat for the Maryland Senate, but lost. From 1960 to 1962, he served as mayor of North Beach.

In 1941, Owings volunteered to join the U.S. Army while a state legislator. He served as an officer in the Army from 1944 to 1946.

He served as executive secretary of the Maryland Watermen's Association. He was deputy district governor of Lions Clubs International.

== Personal life ==
Owings married Mary Maxwell. They had two sons, George W. III and C. Insley. He lived in North Beach for 20 years before moving to Dunkirk in 1965. His son George also served in the Maryland House of Delegates.

Owings died on February 3, 1984, aged 76, at Calvert Memorial Hospital in Prince Frederick. He was buried at Hollywood Cemetery in Richmond, Virginia.
