= Donald H. Owings =

- Born: Donald H. Owings; December 7, 1943; Atlanta, Georgia
- Died: April 11, 2011 (aged 67); Davis, California
- Education: University of Washington
- Known for: Research on ground squirrels Assessment/Management communication Antipredator behavior Robosquirrel
- Awards: Fellow of the Animal Behavior Society; Animal Behavior Exemplar Award
- Scientific career
- Fields: Psychology; Animal Behavior
- Workplaces: University of California, Davis

Donald H. Owings (December 7, 1943 – April 9, 2011) was a professor of psychology and faculty member of the Animal Behavior Graduate Group at the University of California, Davis. His research focused on ground squirrels, in particular, their interactions with predators such as rattlesnakes; and, more generally, on concepts of communication within and between species. In 1994, he was elected as a fellow of the animal behavior society and in 2010 he received the Exemplar Award for mentoring graduate students.

== Biography ==
=== Intellectual ===
He was born in Atlanta, Georgia in the United States. He graduated from Bellaire High School in Houston, Texas. In 1965, he earned a B.A. degree from the University of Texas at Austin followed by a Ph.D. in psychology at the University of Washington in 1972. In 1971, he became a faculty member University of California, Davis department of psychology. In 1994, his research in the field of animal behavior resulted in his election as a fellow of the Animal Behavior Society and in 2010, he received the Exemplar Award for mentor graduate students from the Animal Behavior Society. In connection with this award, one of his former graduate students wrote:

It was so wonderful working with you - I really could not have asked for a better advisor. I learned so much from you and am grateful for how you broadened my understanding of animal behavior and let me be part of a truly fascinating research system and great research team.

=== Personal ===
His parents were Markely J. Owings and Erin White Owings. He was married to Sharon Calhoun Owings and had a son, Ragon and daughter, Anna. He died at his home after battling prostate cancer for over 24 years.

== Research ==
=== Ground squirrels and snakes ===
His primary animal system for investigating animal behavior, social behavior and communication, and antipredator and counter-antipredator behavior was California ground squirrels and snakes (especially rattlesnakes). Adult California ground squirrels must defend against avian and mammalian predators. They also must defend their pups especially from predation by rattlesnakes and gopher snakes. Owings together with his students and colleagues discovered a number of behavioral and physiological defense mechanisms against snakes. When ground squirrels encounter a predator, their first response is to typically vocalize in distinctly different ways to aerial and ground predators. Encounters with snakes may elicit ground predator vocalization, but ground squirrels then shift to visual signaling by tail flagging. Tail flagging has the advantage of harassing snakes and deterring them from entering burrows with squirrel pups, but it has the disadvantage of requiring close proximity to snakes increasing the likelihood of snake bites. In response to this problem, ground squirrels have evolved the capacity to neutralize rattlesnake venom.

Rattlesnakes have evolved specialized sensory organs (infrared-sensitive pit organs) that enhance their ability to predate small mammals. This ability to sense in the infrared set the stage for ground squirrels to evolve antipredator counter-innovations that take advantage of the specialized sensory organs of rattlesnakes. Owings and colleagues found that ground squirrels shunt blood to their tails when encountering rattlesnakes. This allows ground squirrels to tail flag to rattlesnakes even in the dark with their hot tails that rattlesnakes can detect with infrared-sensitive pit organs. Ground squirrels do not shunt blood to their tails when they encounter gopher snakes, which also feed on their young, but lack infrared-sensitive pit organs.

=== Assessment/management communication ===
His research on predator-prey interactions between ground squirrels and rattlesnakes led to the formulation of a new theoretical perspective on communication called assessment/management view of communication. From this perspective, communication is dependent on the sensory and action systems of the individuals engaged in communication. Information is not sent or received by individuals but rather it is extracted from what others are doing and their context (i.e., Gibsonian affordances). The extracted information is then assessed and acted upon. What affordances an individual extracts and assesses depend on its sensory systems and, more generally, on the nature of its umwelt (i.e., an animal's sensory-actions systems). Because communication requires the extraction of information from affordances presented to individuals, this creates the opportunity to manipulate or manage the behavior of others by controlling the affordances they perceive. For example, ground squirrels have evolved the ability to shunt blood to their tails, which heats their tails up. They can then tail-flag at rattlesnakes, which can perceive their hot tails in the infrared. Communication is thus an inter-individual process of extracting and assessing information from affordances and actively managing the affordances perceived by others and thereby managing their behavior. In this view, communication is self-interested behavior, shaped by natural selection.

The assessment/management view of communication is very general, allowing for both intra- and inter-species communication. It can also be extended to human communication to encompass a broader understanding of human communication during early development. The first form of human communication occurs via human infant crying. Human infants are helpless and their sensory-action systems are severely limited when compared to the sensory-action systems of their caregivers. They are very limited in assessing their own needs much less managing them. Caregivers can assess and manage the needs of infants, but they lack direct access to emotional needs of infants (e.g., hunger, pain). Human infant crying is highly salient and normally activates the assessment and management systems of caregivers directing them to crying infants. When successful, caregivers assess the needs of crying infants and act in ways that reduce these needs (e.g., feeding a hungry infant). The noxiousness of crying may be a factor some cases of child abuse.

The assessment/management approach is predictive of malfunctions in infant-caregiver communication. For example, colic is common in technologically developed western countries, and may be the result of the decreased proximity between caregiver and infant. The decreased proximity can result in delayed responses by caregivers to crying infants resulting in infants escalating crying with the subsequent development long bouts crying that do not stop when a caregivers attempts to manage distressed infants.

=== Robosquirrel ===
The robosquirrel project stems directly from Owings' long-term research on the interactions of ground squirrels and rattlesnakes together with his assessment/management view of communication. Robosquirrel was developed to test implication of the assessment/management approach by developing robotic squirrels that could allow researchers to precisely control what affordances (e.g. tail wagging and tail heating) are presented to rattlesnakes for assessment and how these affordances can manage rattlesnake behavior. The development of robosquirrel has received extensive coverage in both science and popular media, but it also created controversy when Senator Tom Coburn highlighted it in his Wastebook 2012 as a scientific research project that wastes United States federal tax dollars. The researchers involved have responded to these issues.

== Selected publications ==
=== Journal articles and book chapters ===
- Owings, D. H.; Borcher, M.; Virginia, R. A (1977). "The behavior of California ground squirrels". Animal Behaviour. 25: 221–230. doi:10.1016/0003-3472(77)90085-9. S2CID 53158532.
- Owings, D. H.; Coss, R. G (1977). "Snake mobbing by California ground squirrels: adaptive variation and ontogeny". Behaviour. 62 (1–2): 50–69. doi:10.1163/156853977x00045.
- Hennessy, D. F.; Owings, D. H.; Rowe, M. P.; Coss, R. G.; Leger, D. W (1981). "The information afforded by a variable signal: constraints on snake-elicited tail flagging by California ground squirrels". Behaviour. 78 (3–4): 188–226. doi:10.1163/156853981X00329.
- Owings, D. H.; Hennessy, D. F.; Leger, D. W.; Gladney, A. B (1986). "Different functions of "alarm" calling for different time scales: a preliminary report on ground squirrels". Behaviour. 99 (1–2): 101–116. doi:10.1163/156853986x00432.
- Owings, D. H.; Coss, R. G (1991). "Context and animal behavior I: introduction and review of theoretical issues". Ecological Psychology. 3: 1–9.
- Owings, D. H.; Morton E. S (1997). "The role of information in communication: an assessment/Management approach". In Owings, D. H.; Beecher, M.; Thompson, N. (eds.). Perspectives in Ethology: Communication. Vol. 12. New York: Plenum Press. pp. 359–390. ISBN 9780306457647.
- Owings, D. H (2002). "The cognitive defender: how ground squirrels assess their predators". In Bekoff, M.; Allen, C.; Burghardt, G. (eds.). The cognitive animal. Cambridge: MIT Press. pp. 19–25. ISBN 9780306457647.
- Owings, D. H (2004). "Human infant crying as an animal communication system: insights from an assessment/management approach". In Oller, D. K.; Griebel, U (eds.). Evolution of communication systems: a comparative approach. Cambridge: MIT Press. ISBN 0-262-15111-1.
- Rundus, A. S.; Owings, D. H.; Joshi, S. S.; Chinn, E.; Giannini, N (2007). "Ground squirrels use an infrared signal to deter rattlesnake predation". Proceedings of the National Academy of Sciences of the United States of America. 104 (36): 14372–14376. doi:10.1073/pnas.0702599104. PMC 1950100. PMID 17704254.
- Joshi, S.; Johnson, R.; Rundus, A.; Clark, R. W.; Barbour, M.; Owings, D. H (2011). "Robotic squirrel models for the study of squirrel-rattlesnake interaction in laboratory and natural settings". IEEE Robotics and Automation Magazine. 18: 59–68. doi:10.1109/MRA.2011.942121. S2CID 9970419.

=== Books ===
- Owings, D. H.; Beecher, M.; Thompson, N. (1997). Perspectives in Ethology: Communication. Vol. 12. New York: Plenum Press. ISBN 9780306457647.
- Owings, D. H.; Morton, E. S. (2006). Animal vocal communication: a new approach. Cambridge, United Kingdom: Cambridge University Press. p. 300. ISBN 978-0521031295.
