= Sunol Regional Wilderness =

Regional park in California, United States

Coordinates: 37°30′36.66″N 121°49′42.78″W

- Interactive map of Sunol Regional Wilderness
- Location: Alameda County, California
- Nearest city: Sunol, California
- Area: 27.74 square kilometres (6,850 acres)
- Created: 1962
- Operator: East Bay Regional Park District

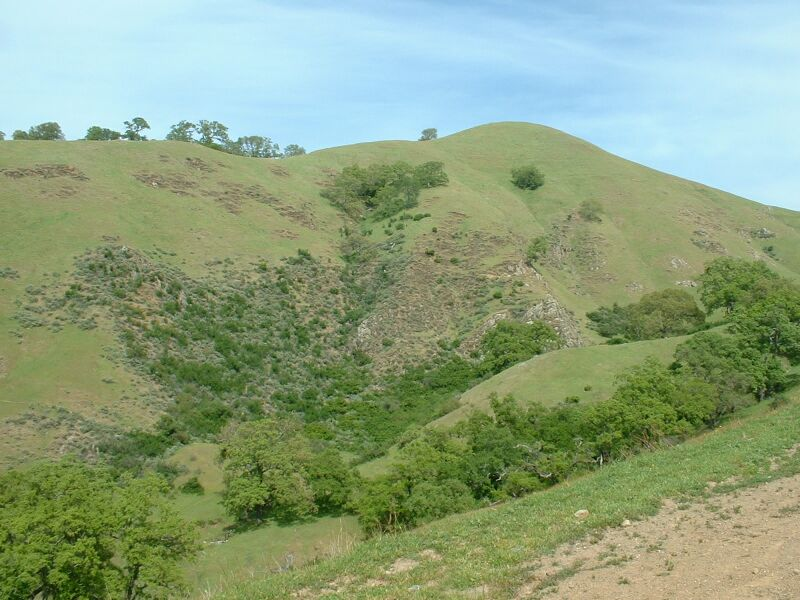
Hillside in Sunol Regional Wilderness

The Sunol Regional Wilderness is a regional park in Alameda County, the eastern San Francisco Bay Area, Northern California. It is located near the town of Sunol, south of Pleasanton and east of Fremont.

The 27.74 square kilometres (6,850 acres) park was established in 1962, and is administered by the East Bay Regional Park District. The park is subject to either closure or fire restriction during the wildfire season from June through October.

== Natural history ==
The park is in the inner California Coast Ranges. It originally was inhabited by Native Americans, and was subsequently primarily ranch land, with chaparral, oak woodland, and grassland habitats.

Grazing rights within the park are still leased, so cattle may be encountered.

=== Flora ===
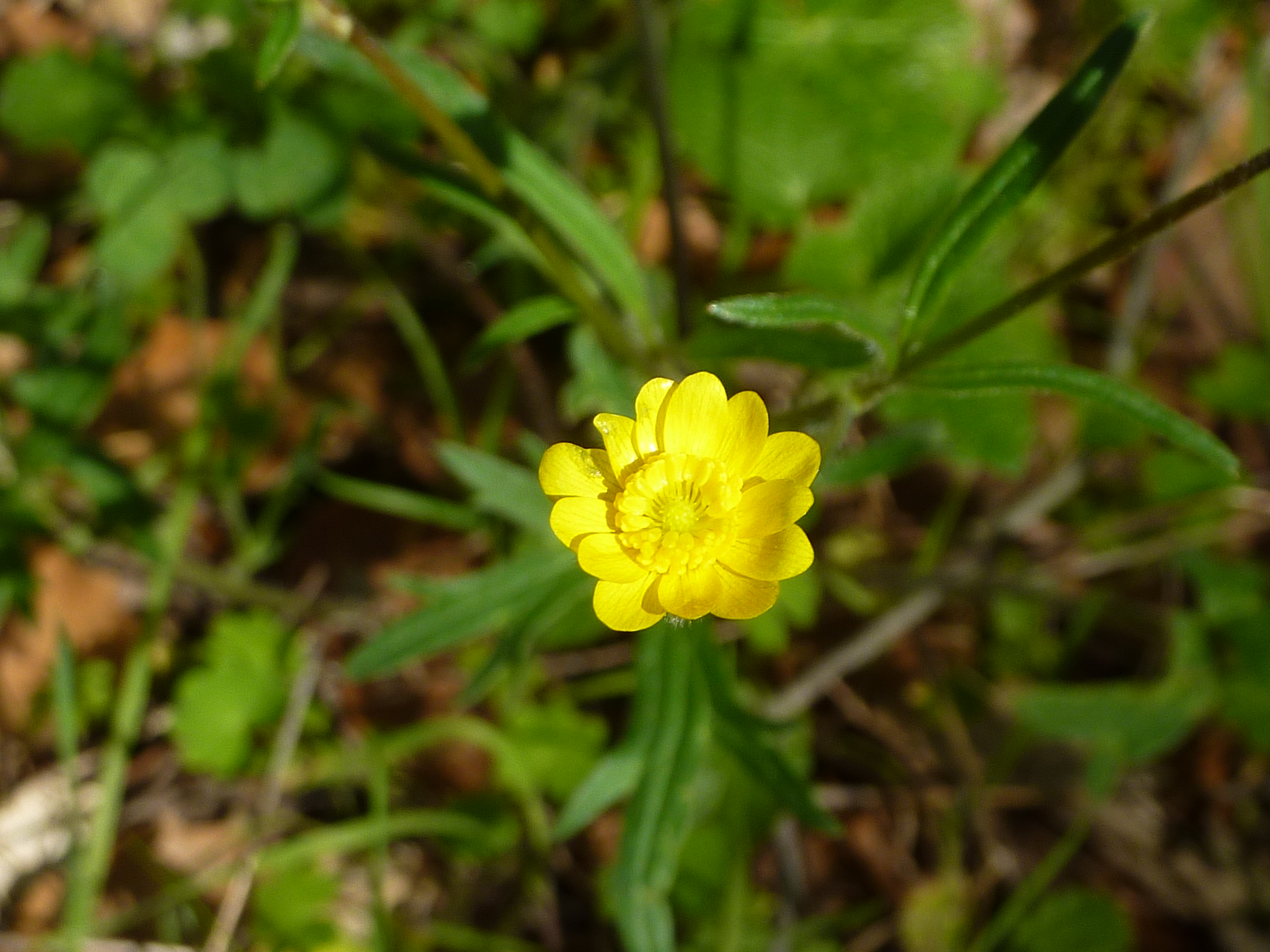
Ranunculus californicus, in Sunol Regional Wilderness.

Common trees in the park include Coast live oak (Quercus agrifolia), Valley oak (Quercus lobata), Blue oak (Quercus douglasii), Mexican elderberry (Sambucus cerulea), Pacific Madrone (Arbutus menziesii) and Gray pine (Pinus sabiniana). Along Alameda Creek, riparian trees include White alder (Alnus rhombifolia), willow species, and California sycamore (Platanus racemosa).

In spring, wildflowers are abundant, including Chinese Houses, Ranunculus, monkeyflowers, California Poppy, goldfields, and several species of Lupines.

=== Fauna ===
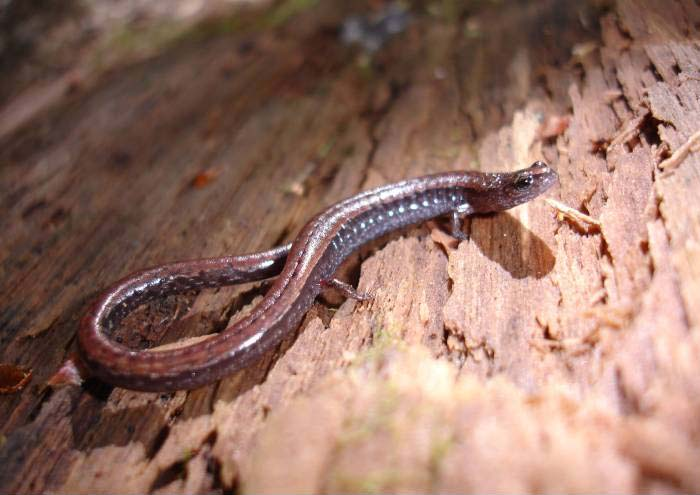
California slender salamander

There are many bird species, including one of the largest breeding populations of golden eagles, supported by large numbers of a common prey and keystone species, the California ground squirrel. skunks and black-tailed deer are also common. Coyotes and mountain lions visit the park, though they are unlikely to be seen by visitors. A well-equipped Visitors' Center has a complete list of plants and birds to be seen in the park. Common amphibians and reptiles include the California red-legged frog, Pacific tree frog, California newt, Diablo Range garter snake, Western rattlesnake and San Francisco alligator lizard.

== Features ==
Trails for hiking, horse-riding, and mountain biking cross the park. There are also facilities for camping.

The Cave Rocks formation is popular for rock climbing.

=== Ohlone Wilderness trail ===
The Ohlone Wilderness trail, a long distance footpath linking several East Bay regional parks, passes through the Sunol Regional Wilderness. It runs from Mission Peak Regional Preserve near Fremont to the Del Valle Regional Park near Livermore. Several backpack campgrounds exist along the way.

Much of the routes land is owned by the San Francisco Water Department. Right to pass is subject to a permit, which is available at the Sunol Wilderness entrance gate.

The terrain between Sunol Wilderness and Del Valle Park can be challenging. Rose Peak is the high point, only a bit lower than Mount Diablo in elevation.

== See also ==
- Flora of the California chaparral and woodlands
- Natural history of the California Coast Ranges
