= George W. Owings III =

American politician (1945–2023)

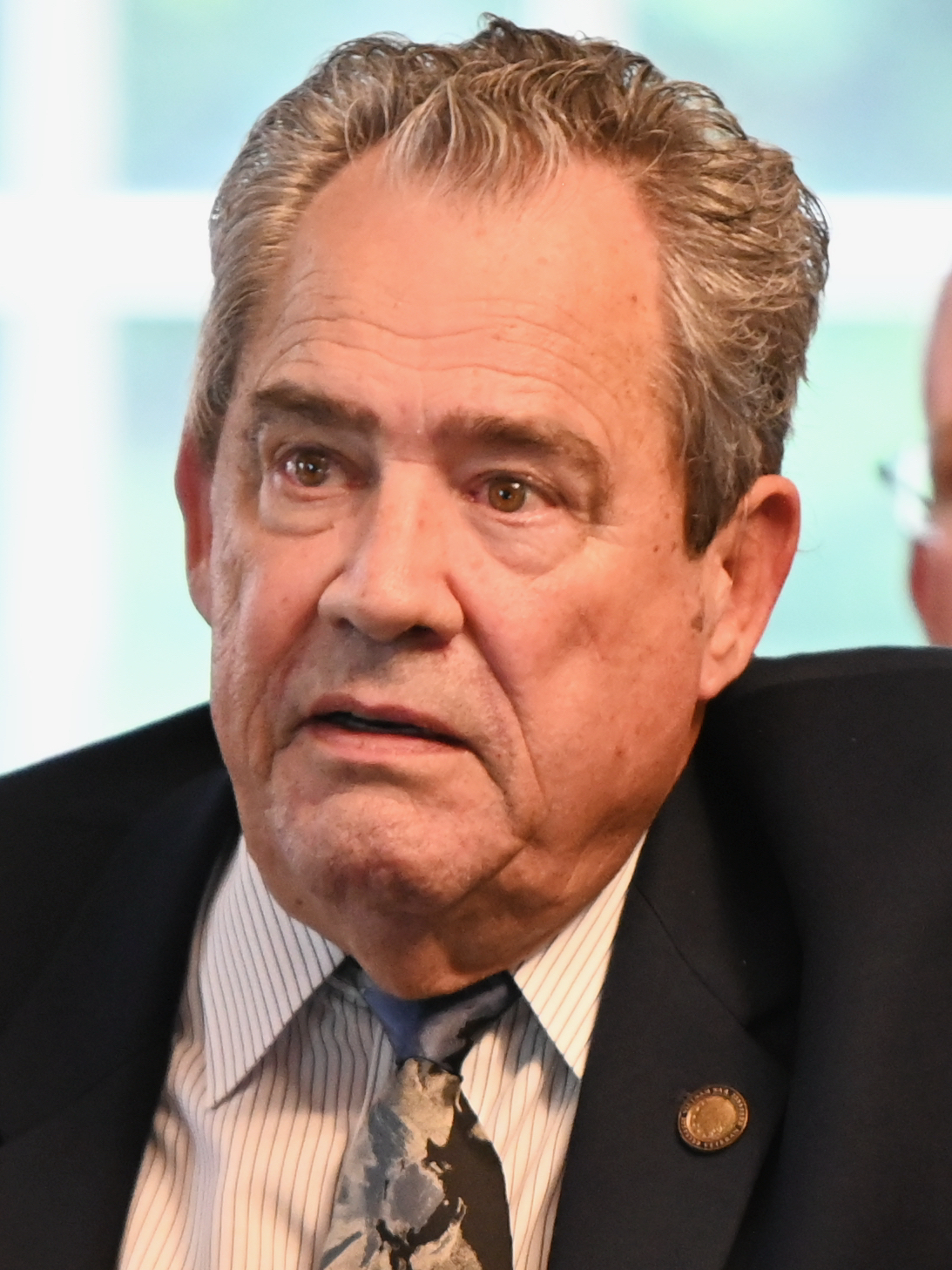
- Owings in 2021

Secretary of the Maryland Department of Veterans Affairs
- In office January 22, 2015 – January 18, 2023
- Governor: Larry Hogan
- Preceded by: Edward Chow Jr.
- Succeeded by: Anthony Woods
- In office June 1, 2004 – May 9, 2007
- Governor: Bob Ehrlich; Martin O'Malley
- Preceded by: Lawrence J. Kimble (acting)
- Succeeded by: James A. Adkins

Member of the Maryland House of Delegates
- In office 1988 – June 1, 2004
- Appointed by: William Donald Schaefer
- Preceded by: Thomas A. Rymer
- Succeeded by: Sue Kullen
- Constituency: District 29A (1988–1994); District 27B (1995–2004)

Personal details
- Born: George William Owings III; April 11, 1945 Daytona Beach, Florida, U.S.
- Died: October 31, 2023 (aged 78) Calvert County, Maryland, U.S.
- Party: Democratic
- Spouse: Louise Carroll (divorced)
- Domestic partner: Katherine Marie Boyd
- Children: 1
- Parent: George W. Owings Jr. (father)
- Education: Prince George's Community College (AA)
- Military career
- Branch: United States Marine Corps
- Rank: Sergeant
- Conflicts: Vietnam War
- Awards: Navy and Marine Corps Medal

George William Owings III (April 11, 1945 – October 31, 2023) was an American politician. He served as the Secretary of the Maryland Department of Veterans Affairs from 2004 to 2007 and from 2015 to 2023. He served as a member of the Maryland House of Delegates in District 29A and District 27B from 1988 to 2004.

== Early life and education ==
George William Owings III was born on April 11, 1945, in Daytona Beach, Florida, to Mary (née Maxwell) and George W. Owings Jr. His father was elected to the Maryland House of Delegates in 1938 and later served as chief clerk in 1956. Owings attended Calvert High School in Prince Frederick, Maryland. He attended the University of Maryland, College Park, from 1963 to 1964, afterwards serving in the Vietnam War as a sergeant in the U.S. Marine Corps. He graduated from Prince George's Community College in 1978 with an Associate of Arts in liberal arts.

== Career ==
Owings worked as a mortgage banker with Residential Financial Corporation. He was a member of the Democratic Party. He ran twice for commissioner of Calvert County, but lost. He was appointed by Governor William Donald Schaefer as a member of the Maryland House of Delegates, succeeding Thomas A. Rymer in January 1988. He represented District 29A from 1988 to 1994 and District 27B from 1995 to 2004. He also served as the House Majority Whip from 1994 to 2004, lobbying for issues including legalizing slot machines.

Owings was appointed the Secretary of the Maryland Department of Veterans Affairs on March 18, 2004, by Governor Bob Ehrlich. He remained in that role until January 17, 2007. He then served as acting secretary until May 9, 2007, when Governor Martin O'Malley appointed James A. Adkins to succeed him.

In July 2009, Owings said he was exploring a run against O'Malley in the Democratic primary of the 2010 Maryland gubernatorial election. He announced his candidacy in January 2010, and ran on a platform criticizing O'Malley for raising taxes, cutting the state's budget, and repealing the death penalty. Owings dropped out of the race on July 1, 2010, after undergoing a major surgery.

In March 2014, Owings filed to run for county commissioner in Calvert County. He placed first in the Democratic primary, but was defeated by Republicans Steve Weems and Tom Hejl in the general election.

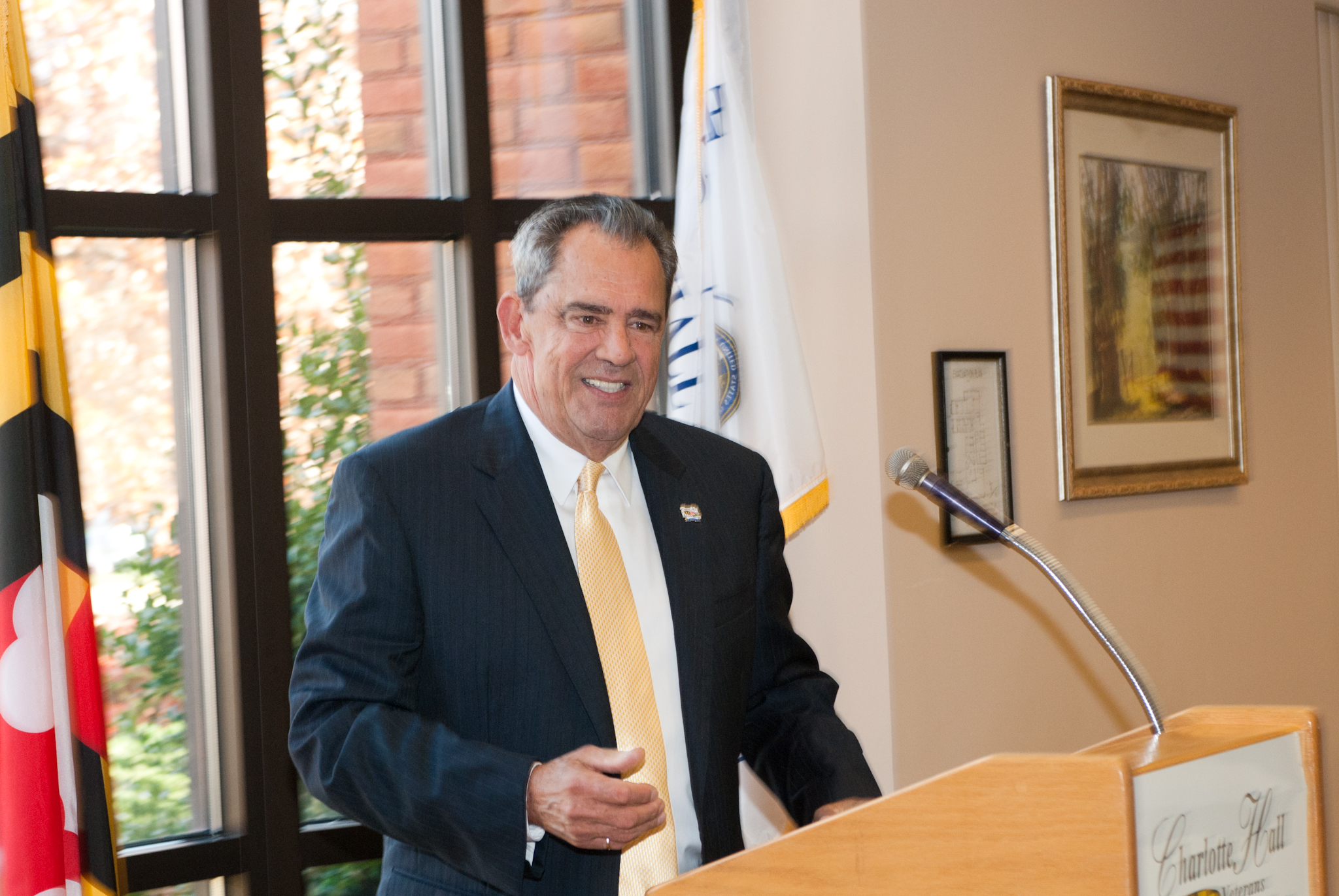
Owings at the Charlotte Hall Veterans Home in 2015

In December 2014, Governor-elect Larry Hogan announced that he would appoint Owings as Secretary of the Maryland Department of Veterans Affairs. He took office on January 22, 2015, and was sworn in on February 13. He served in that role until the end of Hogan's tenure as governor. Following the end of his tenure, state inspectors released a series of reports documenting allegations of abuse and neglect at the Charlotte Hall Veterans Home, the state's only veterans home, which Owings said he was first made aware of in "late 2021, early 2022" and had never discussed the conditions at the veterans home with Hogan. He faulted the COVID-19 pandemic for straining resources at Charlotte Hall, but said that he would "take the blame" for the issues. The Maryland General Assembly passed legislation to increase oversight over the Charlotte Hill Veterans Home in response to these reports in 2023, and the Maryland Board of Public Works voted to award a $159 million contract with PruittHealth to oversee the veterans home.

Owings was director of Operation Raise the Roof, a veteran outreach program.

== Personal life ==
Owings was married to his wife, Louise Carroll, whom he later divorced. Together, they had one son, George W. IV. Owings's partner was Katherine Marie Boyd.

Owings died in Calvert County on October 31, 2023, at age 78. Following the news of his death, Governor Larry Hogan and Chesapeake Beach expressed their condolences. His funeral was attended by Hogan, Bob Ehlrich, U.S. Representative Steny Hoyer, and Maryland Veterans Affairs Secretary Anthony Woods.

Owings' decorations and medals include the Presidential Unit Citation, Navy Unit Commendation with Bronze Star Device, Navy and Marine Corps Medal and the Vietnam Service Medal with Silver Star Device.

== Political positions ==
=== Animal welfare ===
During the 1991 legislative session, Owings introduced legislation to create financial penalties for hunting or killing a bald eagle. In 1999, he proposed a bill to make animal cruelty a felony offense, which was watered down in committee.

=== Gun policy ===
During the 2000 legislative session, Owings opposed legislation requiring built-in locks for all new handguns.

=== Social issues ===
During the 1991 legislative session, Owings voted against a bill creating a referendum on codifying the right to abortion into the Constitution of Maryland. In 1997, he introduced legislation banning "partial-birth abortions". In 2003, Owings sought to amend the state budget to remove $2.5 million for Medicaid-funded abortions.

During the 1998 legislative session, Owings introduced legislation that would make it optional for adults to wear a helmet while riding a motorcycle. The bill was rejected in committee.

In 2000, Owings introduced a bill that would allow students to volunteer a prayer during graduation ceremonies.

During the 2001 legislative session, Owings voted against legislation banning discrimination against homosexuals.

In September 2019, Owings ordered the removal of a plaque put up the by Sons of the Confederacy to honor Raphael Semmes, a Confederate Navy officer who had attended the Charlotte Hall Military Academy.

=== Taxes ===
During the 2004 legislative session, Owings voted against a bill to raise $1 billion in sales and income taxes to pay for education reforms.

== Electoral history ==
Maryland House of Delegates District 29A election, 1990
Party	Candidate	Votes	%
Democratic	George W. Owings III (incumbent)	5,709	54.7
Republican	Joyce Stinnett Baki	3,711	35.6
Independent	William Johnston	1,012	9.7

Maryland House of Delegates District 27B election, 1994
Party	Candidate	Votes	%
Democratic	George W. Owings III (incumbent)	7,037	61.6
Republican	Edward B. Finch	4,383	38.4

Maryland House of Delegates District 27B election, 1994
Party	Candidate	Votes	%
Democratic	George W. Owings III (incumbent)	7,603	56.8
Republican	Joseph J. Rooney	5,791	43.2

Maryland House of Delegates District 27B election, 2002
Party	Candidate	Votes	%
Democratic	George W. Owings III (incumbent)	9,753	98.1
Write-in		191	1.9

Calvert County Commissioner At-Large Democratic primary election, 2014
Party	Candidate	Votes	%
Democratic	George W. Owings III	3,440	45.6
Democratic	Joyce Stinnett Baki	2,879	38.2
Democratic	Nance Pretto-Simmons	1,223	16.2

Calvert County Commissioner At-Large election, 2014
Party	Candidate	Votes	%
Republican	Steve Weems (incumbent)	17,524	30.2
Republican	Tom Hejl	15,771	27.2
Democratic	George W. Owings III	12,350	21.3
Democratic	Joyce Stinnett Baki	9,549	16.5
Independent	Paul Harrison	2,752	4.7
Write-in		68	0.1
