= Anthony Woods =

American politician (born 1980)

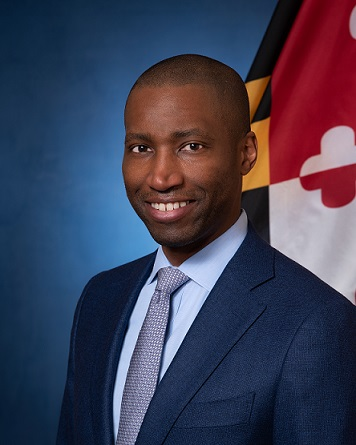

Secretary of the Maryland Department of Veterans and Military Families
- In office March 2, 2023 – May 11, 2025; Acting: January 18, 2023 – March 2, 2023
- Governor: Wes Moore
- Preceded by: George W. Owings III
- Succeeded by: Ross Cohen (acting)

Personal details
- Born: Anthony Christopher Woods; July 20, 1980 (age 46) Fairfield, California, U.S.
- Party: Democratic
- Education: United States Military Academy (BS); Harvard University (MPP); University of Maryland, College Park (MBA)
- Military career
- Allegiance: United States
- Branch: United States Army
- Service years: 2003–2008 (active); 2014–present (reserves)
- Rank: Major
- Unit: U.S. Army Reserve

Anthony Christopher Woods (born July 20, 1980) is an American politician who served as the secretary of the Maryland Department of Veterans and Military Families from 2023 to 2025. He was a U.S. Army officer deployed during Operation Iraqi Freedom. Woods was discharged in 2008 for violating the military's "Don't ask, don't tell" policy.

== Early life and education ==
Born on July 20, 1980, at Travis Air Force Base in Fairfield, California, Woods was raised by a single mother who supported her family as a small business owner and housekeeper. As a child, Woods lived in both Fairfield and Vacaville in the North Bay region of the San Francisco Bay Area. He graduated with honors from Vanden High School in 1999. Woods received a nomination from U.S. representative Vic Fazio (D CA-3) to attend the United States Military Academy. At West Point, he majored in economics and political science, and graduated in 2003 with a B.S. in Economics and American Politics with a minor in computer science. In 2008, Woods completed a Master of Public Policy from the Harvard Kennedy School. He earned an executive Master of Business Administration from the Robert H. Smith School of Business at the University of Maryland, College Park.

== Military service ==
Woods was commissioned in the United States Army as a second lieutenant in the Armor branch and began the Armor Officer Basic Course at Fort Knox, Kentucky, in July 2003. While there, he volunteered for his first deployment to Iraq to lead a platoon of National Guard soldiers. Woods deployed to the Diyala province of Iraq, where he served for eleven months.

Woods returned from this deployment to the U.S. in January 2005 and was transferred from Fort Bragg to Fort Carson, Colorado. Later that year, in June 2005, he made his second deployment to Iraq with the 3rd Armored Cavalry Regiment.

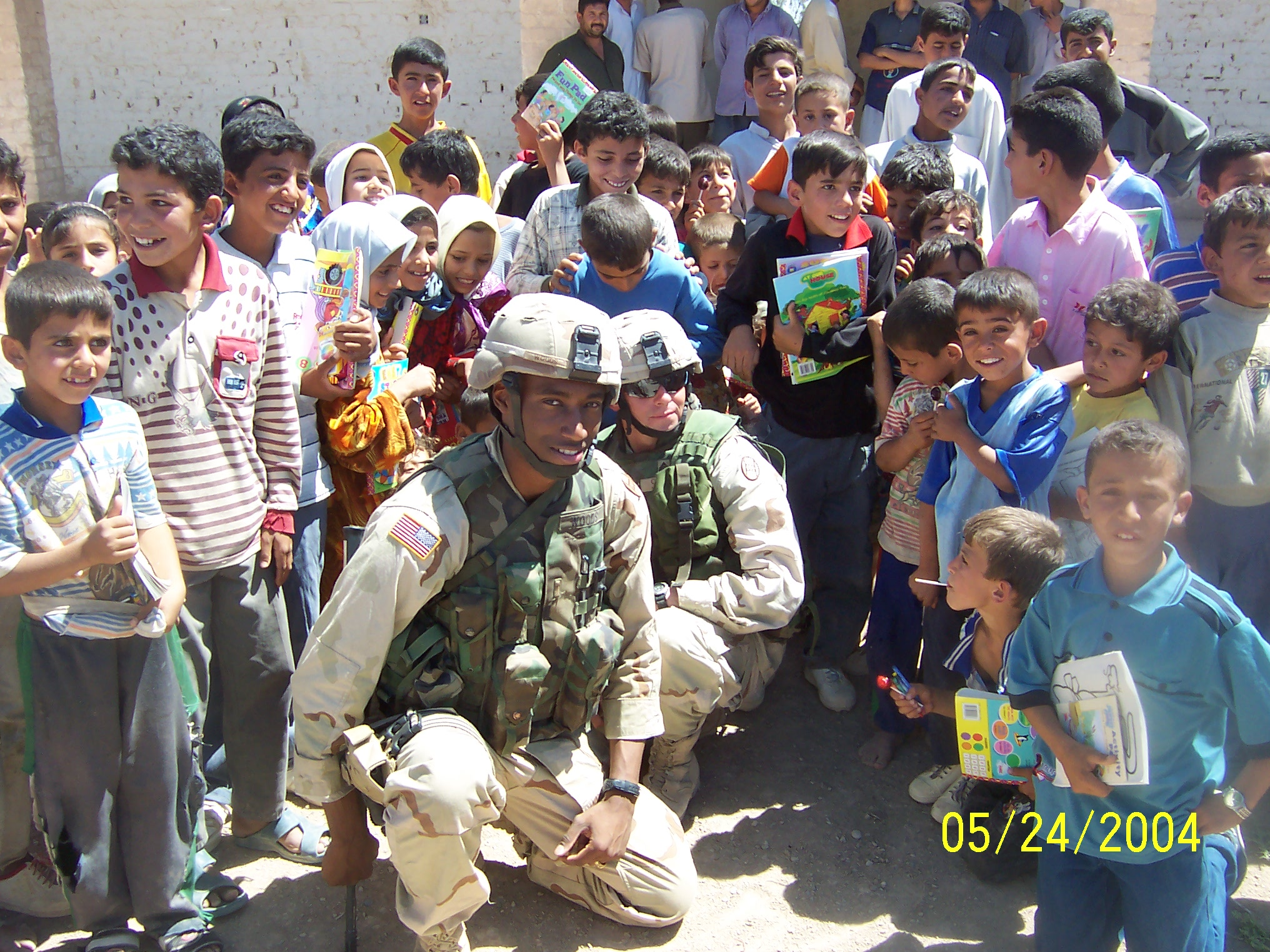
Woods on active service in Iraq

Upon return from his second deployment, the Army selected Woods to teach at West Point, an unusual appointment for so junior an officer and one which would require him to earn a graduate degree first. That year, he enrolled at the John F. Kennedy School of Government at Harvard University, where he studied for a master's degree in public policy.

While at Harvard, Woods volunteered to mentor low-income minorities applying to college and numerous other community leadership activities, including co-founding the first student chapter of The Fuller Center for Housing and making three trips to New Orleans to assist families struggling to rebuild following Hurricane Katrina. He was among a group of students awarded the Robert F. Kennedy Public Service Award for this work.

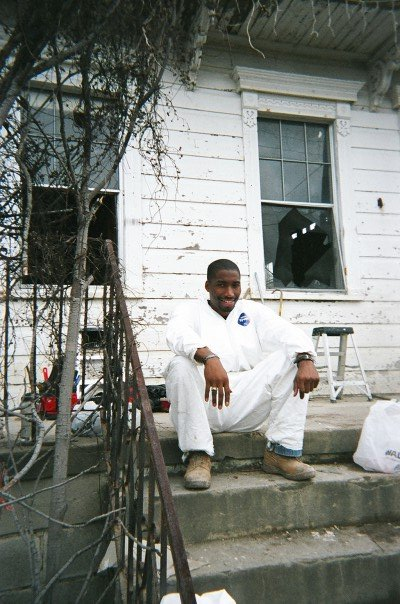
Woods helping in the recovery after Hurricane Katrina in New Orleans

During the summer of 2007, Woods co-led a group of thirty cyclists across the U.S. to raise money for Habitat for Humanity through a non-profit group known as Bike & Build. The trip took them across the United States from the Outer Banks of North Carolina to San Diego, California. The group raised over $130,000 and built homes in five states during their trip.

Before graduating in 2008, Woods competed for the opportunity to speak at Harvard's annual commencement and was selected as one of three students to deliver a commencement speech.

Shortly after graduation, Woods reported to Fort Knox, Kentucky, for the Armor Captain's Career Course. Shortly thereafter, Woods outed himself as gay and was subsequently discharged under the government's now-repealed “Don't ask, don't tell” policy. For this decision, Woods was ordered to reimburse the Army for the $35,000 tuition paid on his behalf to attend Harvard. In December 2008, the U.S. Army completed the discharge process for Woods.

In 2014, Woods joined the United States Army Reserve as a major in military intelligence.

== Civilian career ==
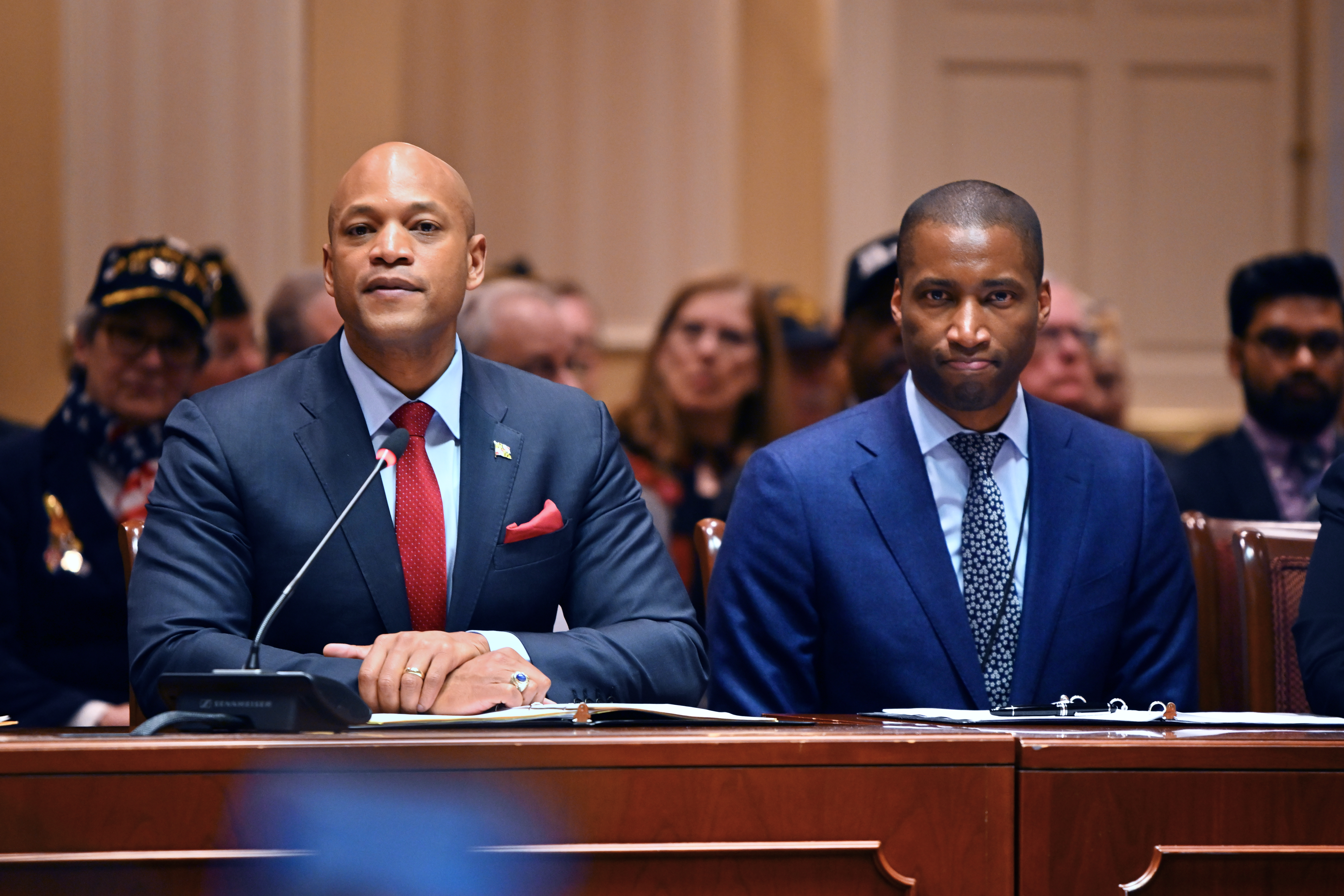
Woods and Moore in March 2023

After his honorable discharge from the Army in 2008, Woods worked as an aide for Governor David Paterson of New York. On March 18, 2009, Woods declared his intention to run in the 2009 California's 10th congressional district special election to replace representative Ellen Tauscher, who was nominated by President Barack Obama to serve as Undersecretary of State for Arms Control and International Security. His campaign made it a high-profile affair receiving national attention. However, his bid to become the first openly gay African-American elected to Congress ended when he lost a special election held on September 1, 2009, receiving under 9 percent of the vote.

Following the campaign in California, Woods returned to Washington, D.C., where he worked for the nonprofit Be the Change, Inc. Woods helped run the organization's ServiceNation campaign devoted to increasing support for expanding national service programs like the Peace Corps and AmeriCorps. He served as the Director of the "Service as a Strategy" initiative, aiding in developing volunteer-driven solutions for American cities. In 2011, Woods joined the 2011–2012 Class of White House Fellows. Woods worked at the United States Office of Personnel Management under John Berry during this time.

On January 12, 2023, Maryland governor-elect Wes Moore nominated Woods as the Secretary of the Maryland Department of Veterans Affairs. His nomination was unanimously approved by the Maryland Senate on February 17. Woods stepped down as secretary on May 11, 2025, to join a technology startup.

== Personal life ==
Woods is married. His spouse was a contractor with United States Agency for International Development until 2025.

== See also ==
- Sexual orientation and the United States military
