= Rancho Quito =

Mexican land grant in California

Coordinates: 37.320°N 122.020°W

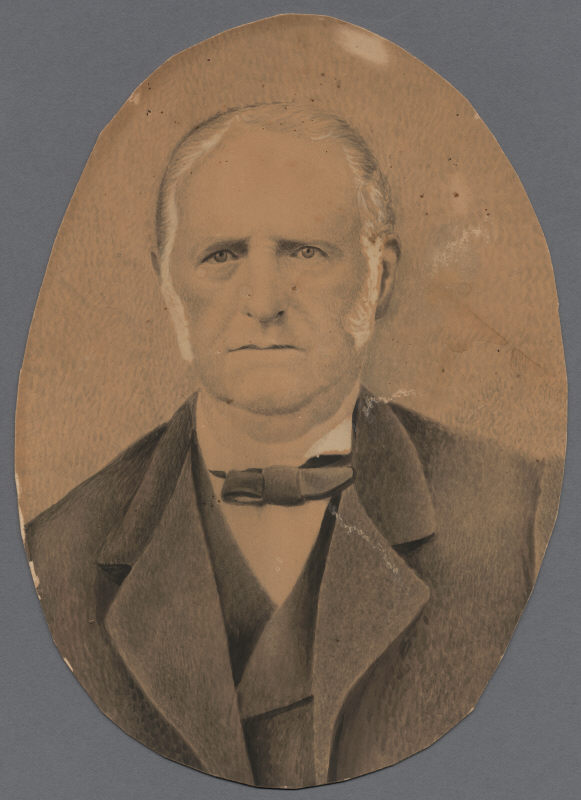
Don José Noriega was the rancho grantee of Rancho Quito in 1841.

Rancho Quito was a 13,310-acre (53.9 km^{2}) Mexican land grant in present-day Santa Clara County, California given in 1841 by Governor Juan Alvarado to José Zenon Fernandez and José Noriega. The grant included present-day Saratoga, Campbell, and Cupertino. The eastern boundary was Arroyo San Tomas Aquino.

== History ==
The rancho was granted to José Noriega and his father-in-law, José Zenon Fernandez in 1841. Fernandez, came to California with the Hijar-Padres Colony in 1834, and was a teacher in San Jose from 1836 to 1840. Sons Dionisio and Máximo were granted Rancho Fernandez in 1846. Noriega sold his share of the rancho to José Manuel Alviso in 1844.

With the cession of California to the United States following the Mexican–American War, the 1848 Treaty of Guadalupe Hidalgo provided that the land grants would be honored. As required by the Land Act of 1851, a claim for Rancho Quito was filed with the Public Land Commission in 1852, and the grant was patented to José M. Alviso and the heirs of José Zenon Fernandez (Dioniso Fernandez, Francisco Maximo Fernandez, Jose Zenon Fernandez, Manuela Loveto Fernandez, and Petra Enriquez Fernandez) in 1866.

In 1859, Alviso sold part of the rancho to José Ramon Argüello. Before the boundaries of the rancho were defined several families occupied what they thought was public land east of Cupertino.

== José Noriega ==
José Noriega (1798–) was born in Asturias, Spain, and came to California with the Hijar-Padres Colony on the "Natalia" in 1834. He married Manuela Fernandez daughter of José Zenon Fernandez (–1844), who also came with Hijar-Padres Colony in 1834. Noriega was alcalde of San Jose 1839. Noriega was grantee of Rancho Los Meganos in 1835 (sold to John Marsh in 1837), Rancho Las Positas in 1839 (sold to Robert Livermore in 1854), and Rancho Quito in 1841 (sold to Manuel Alviso in 1844), and purchased Rancho Canada de los Vaqueros in 1847 (sold in 1856).
