= Rancho Cañada de los Vaqueros =

Mexican land grant Rancho Cañada de los Vaqueros included Contra Costa

Coordinates: 37.810°N 121.710°W

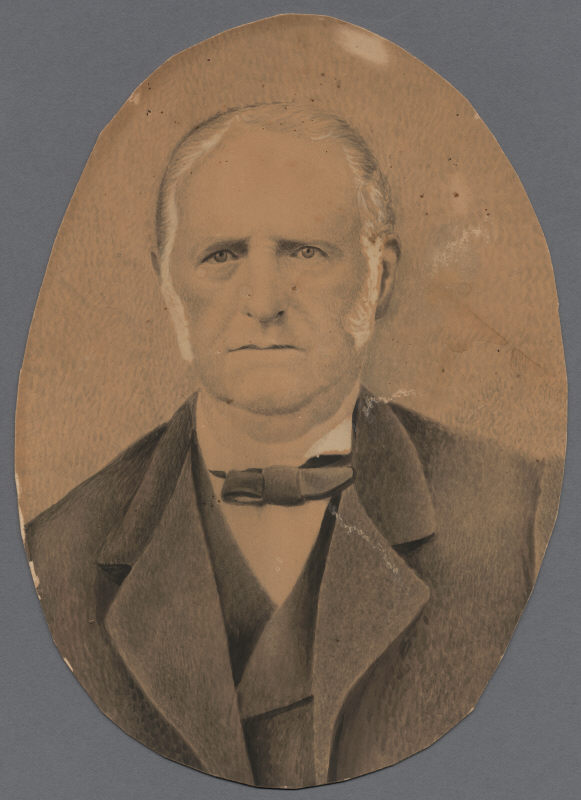
José Noriega purchased Rancho Cañada de los Vaqueros in 1847.

Rancho Cañada de los Vaqueros was a 17,760-acre (71.9 km^{2}) Mexican land grant mostly in present-day eastern Contra Costa County, California, and partially into northeastern Alameda County, California. Los Vaqueros Reservoir, located between Livermore and Brentwood in the Diablo Range, is on and named for the former rancho. Vasco Road passes through the site.

It was given in 1844 by Governor Manuel Micheltorena to Antonio Higuera, Francisco Alviso and Manuel Miranda. The name means "Canyon of the Cowboys" in Spanish.

== History ==
Antonio Higuera, Francisco Alviso and Manuel Miranda were granted the four league rancho in 1844. Jose Antonio Higuera (1795– ), who was married to Josefa Antonio Alviso, was the uncle of brothers-in-law Francisco Alviso (1818– ) and Manuel Miranda (1816– ). Francisco Alviso was married to Maria Isabela Miranda, and Manuel Ciriaco Miranda was married to Maria Del Carmen Alviso. In 1847 Alviso and Miranda sold their interests to José Noriega and Robert Livermore who also owned Rancho Las Positas to the south.

With the cession of California to the United States following the Mexican-American War, the 1848 Treaty of Guadalupe Hidalgo provided that the land grants would be honored. As required by the Land Act of 1851, a claim for Rancho Cañada de los Vaqueros was filed with the Public Land Commission in 1852.

In 1854, Livermore and Noriega came to an agreement, where Livermore purchased Noriega's half of Rancho Las Positas and sold his half of Rancho Cañada de los Vaqueros to Noriega. This was the beginning of several lawsuits, and the ownership of the property was not resolved until 1897. Noriega hired an attorney, and gave him a half interest in Rancho Cañada de los Vaqueros in lieu of fee, and sold the other half to Maximo Fernandez. Both halves of Rancho Cañada de los Vaqueros were again sold in separate transactions in 1857. Unknown to Noriega, Livermore had already conveyed his interest in Rancho Cañada de los Vaqueros to his wife and children in 1852; so that the deed from Livermore to Noriega in fact conveyed nothing, in as much as Livermore had then no title to convey. When Livermore died in 1858, his widow and children claimed Rancho Cañada de los Vaqueros based on the deed predating the Noriega transfer. At the same time, the four children of Antonio Higuera claimed a one third interest in Rancho Cañada de los Vaqueros.

By 1860, various parties held deeds totaling nearly twice the Rancho Cañada de los Vaqueros grant. The grant was patented to Robert Livermore and Jose Noriega Nov. 22, 1889, for 17,760.00 acres. Finally in 1897 Mary Crocker, heir to Charles McLaughlin, was the owner of the entire rancho. Mary Crocker died in 1929 and her heirs divided and sold the rancho in 1935. The Contra Costa Water District began buying the land in the 1980s.

== See also ==
- Ranchos of Contra Costa County, California
