= Hagemann Ranch Historic District =

- U.S. National Register of Historic Places
- U.S. Historic district
- California Historical Landmark
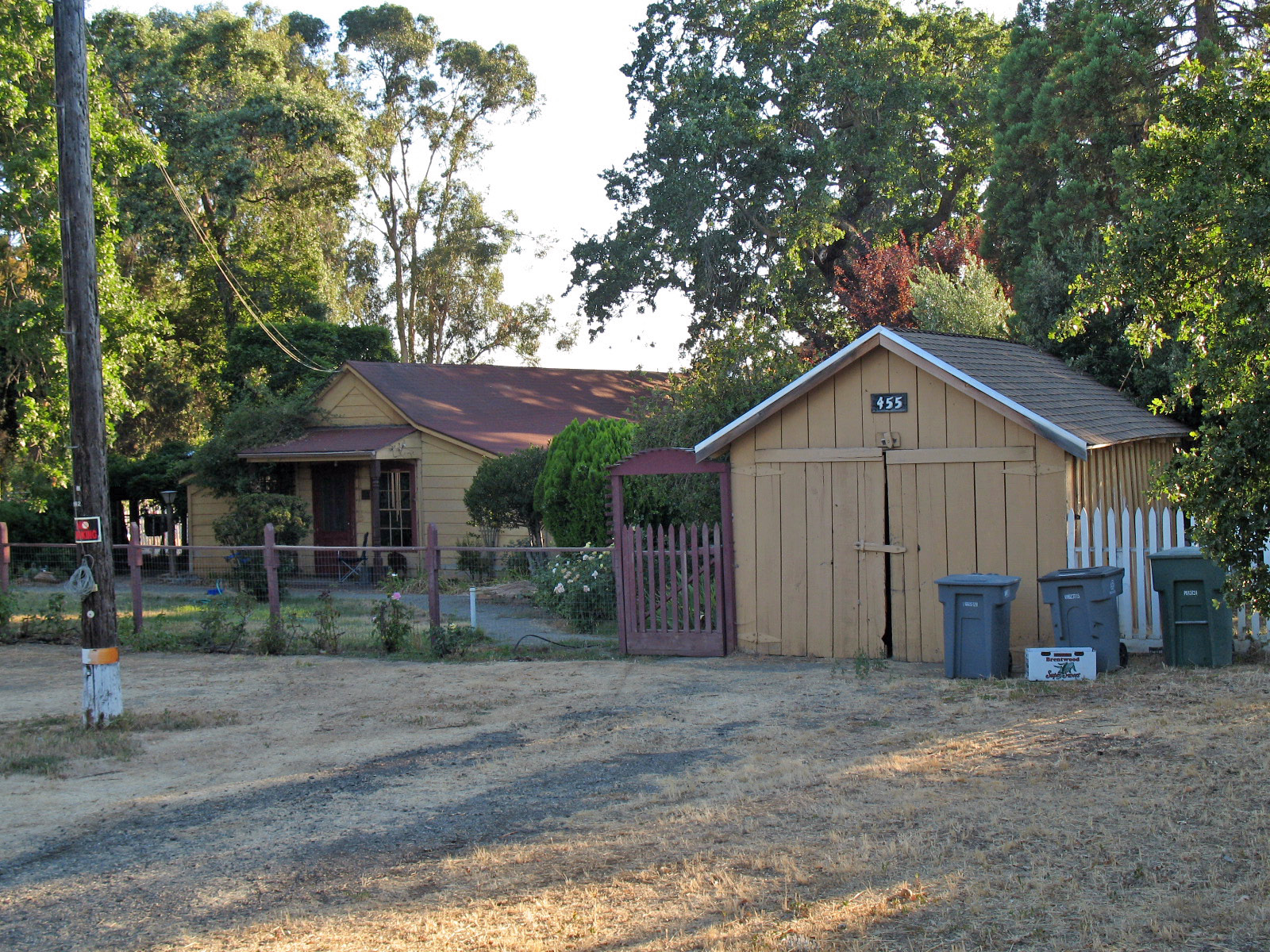

- Location within California
- Location: 455 Olivina Ave., Livermore, Alameda County, California, U.S.
- Coordinates: 37.6824°N 121.7974°W
- Area: 4.6 acres (1.9 ha)
- Built: 1870
- Architectural style: 19th century folk farmhouse
- Website: Official website
- NRHP reference No.: 07001351
- CHISL No.: N2380

Significant dates
- Added to NRHP: January 10, 2008
- Designated CHISL: January 10, 2008

Hagemann Ranch Historic District is a 19th-century historic district containing a farmhouse and ranch located in Livermore, California. Within the district, the agricultural past in Livermore Valley can be remembered. It is owned and managed by the Livermore Heritage Guild, and is open to the public once a month.

The Hagemann Ranch Historic District has been listed on the National Register of Historic Places since January 10, 2008; and a California Historical Landmark since January 10, 2008.

== History ==
The Hagemann Ranch Historic District consists of a late 19th-century farmhouse, built in 1870, and eleven related outbuildings that are contributing properties. It was one of the first ranches established after the 1869 break up of the land grant, Rancho Valle de San José. The property is located one and one half miles west of downtown Livermore, surrounded by a subdivision of single family homes. From the time it was built in 1870 until 1962, the Hagemann Ranch was a working farm for cattle grazing; horse raising; the production of wheat, hay, orchards and vines. The other contributing properties include two chicken coops, a cow barn, a milk barn, a horse barn, a blacksmith shop, a granary, a garage, an equipment shed, and a pump House/windmill.

In the 1950s, much of the surrounding farmland was turned into housing, used by many of the workers at the newly established Lawrence Livermore Laboratory (now Lawrence Livermore National Laboratory). It is located next to Hagemann Park.

== See also ==
- National Register of Historic Places listings in Alameda County, California
