= Livermore Valley Charter Preparatory =

Defunct charter school in California, United States

Location
- 3090 Independence Dr; Livermore, California 94551; United States; 37.706696°N 121.815224°W

Information
- Type: California Public Charter High School
- Established: 2010
- Closed: June 30, 2017
- Sister school: Livermore Valley Charter School
- School district: Livermore Valley Joint Unified School District
- Grades: 9-12
- Enrollment: under 500
- Colors: Red and black
- Mascot: Hawks
- Nickname: LVCP
- Website: lvcp.org

Livermore Valley Charter Preparatory (LVCP) was a California Public Charter High School located at 3090 Independence Drive. in Livermore, California. Established in 2010, the school was authorized by the Livermore Valley Joint Unified School District (LVJUSD). The bankruptcy of its parent charter management operator Tri-Valley Learning Corporation (TVLC) resulted after the completion of an AB139 Extraordinary Audit ordered by Alameda County Office of Education (ACOE) and performed by FCMAT.

LVCP and its sister school, Livermore Valley Charter School, closed on June 30, 2017.
