= Los Vaqueros Reservoir =

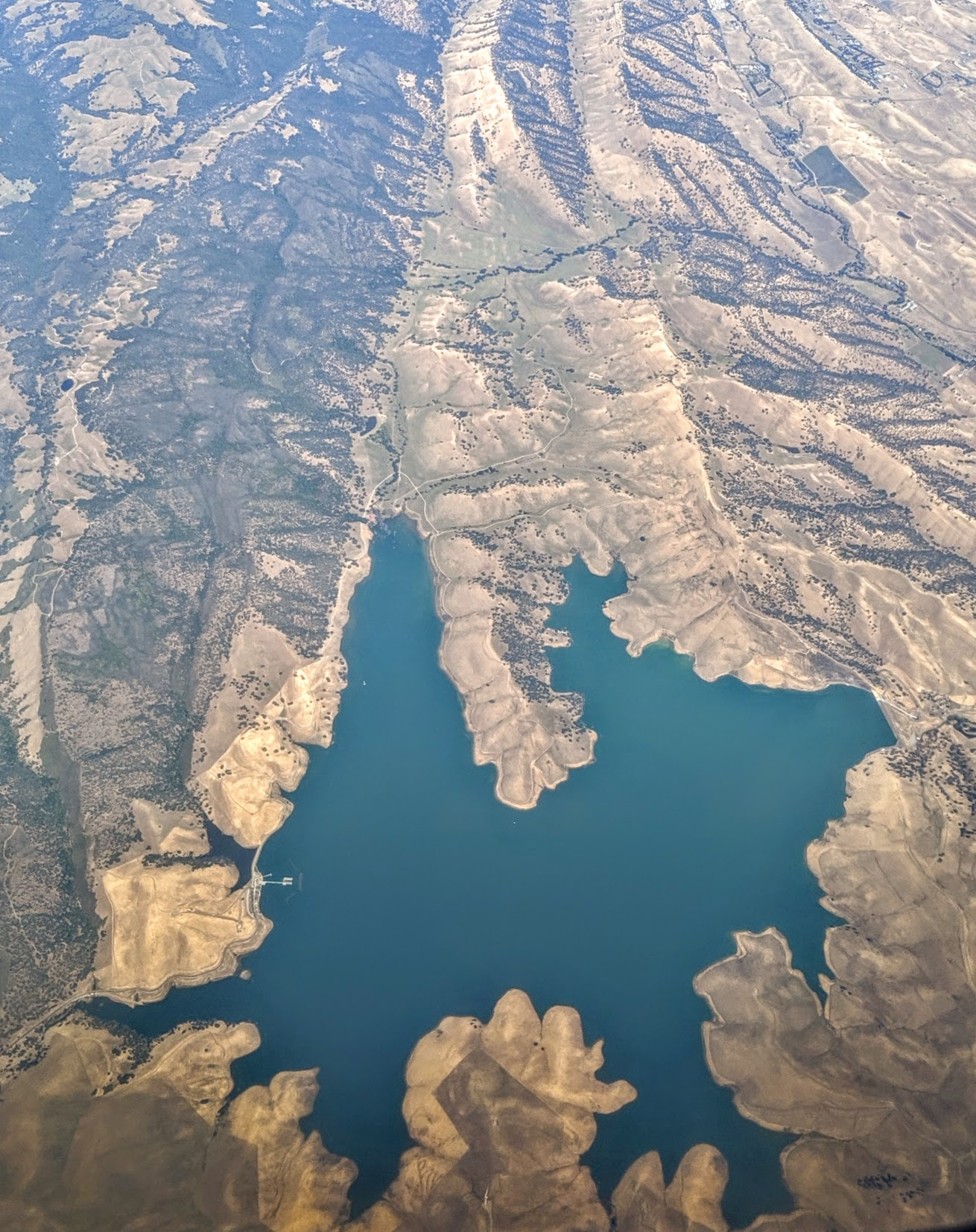
- Aerial view from the southeast

- Location within California Location within the United States
- Location: Diablo Range, Contra Costa County, California
- Coordinates: 37.82025°N 121.7338°W
- Type: reservoir
- Basin countries: United States
- Max. length: 2.5 mi (4.0 km)
- Max. width: 2.5 mi (4.0 km)
- Surface area: 1,400 acres (570 ha)
- Average depth: 170 ft (52 m)
- Max. depth: 170 ft (52 m)
- Water volume: 160,000 acre⋅ft (0.20 km^{3})
- Surface elevation: 524 ft (160 m)
- Settlements: Brentwood, Livermore

The Los Vaqueros Reservoir and watershed is located in the northern Diablo Range, within northeastern Contra Costa County, northern California. It was completed by the Contra Costa Water District (CCWD) in 1998 (28 years ago) to improve the quality of drinking water for its 550,000 customers in Central and Eastern Contra Costa County. The reservoir is accessible via Vasco Road, a road which connects Brentwood and Livermore.

Some 20,000 acres of land was acquired to provide for construction of the dam and its 1500-acre reservoir, as well as protection of 19,300 acres of associated watershed.

== History ==
Los Vaqueros Reservoir is named for the 19th-century Mexican Rancho Cañada de los Vaqueros land grant that included its site. The Spanish word vaquero means "cowboy" in English.

Incursions of saline water into the Sacramento-San Joaquin River Delta from the San Francisco Bay has been a concern since the 1870s. This concern was one of the reasons CCWD was formed in 1936. A drought in 1977 caused salinity levels for the water supply to exceed public health standards. It forced CCWD to ration deliveries of fresh water to its customers.

An expansion project begun in 2010 raised the height of the dam to increase storage capacity from 100,000 acre-ft to 160,000 acre-ft of water. At the start of February 2017, the reservoir contained 133,700 acre-feet (164,900,000 m^{3}) of water.

=== Project requirements ===
In 1988, voters approved funding of the Los Vaqueros Reservoir project to begin design and construction. It was a massive project. In addition to building the $61 million, 192-foot-tall dam, the district had to:

- secure nearly 20,000 acres land for the dam and the watershed
- build 12.8 miles of Vasco Road around the watershed at a cost of $27 million
- relocate 20 electrical towers and 12 miles of gas line
- build a new $20 million 10,000 horsepower pumping plant on Old River near Discovery Bay
- construct a new $12 million transfer station with 8,000 horsepower pumps
- build 20 miles of 6- to 8- foot diameter buried pipeline connecting all the new facilities with district's existing canal system in Antioch
- commit to preserving the environment and respecting Native American and other historical sites in the watershed.

=== Construction timeline ===
- Construction began Sept. 17, 1994.
- By 1996, Vasco Road had been relocated around the eastern edge of the CCWD property. The original road was closed to travelers from just south of Marsh Creek Road to the present Los Vaqueros Road. Half of the pipeline from Old River to Discovery Bay had also been completed. Construction of the pump station was in progress.
- The dam and most of the other major items were completed by December 1997. Filling of the reservoir with water began in February 1998, and was completed by January 1999, a year ahead of schedule.
- The project dedication ceremony occurred in May 1998. The American Society of Civil Engineers named the project as the "Outstanding Civil Engineering Accomplishment" in the nation in that year.

=== 2010–2012 expansion project ===
In March, 2010, CCWD approved a capacity increase of 60,000 acre-feet (74,000,000 m^{3}). Costs will be passed on to those that receive water from the water District. Mitigation for the loss of sensitive wildlife habitat will be necessary. This increase is scheduled for completion in 2012. On July 14, 2012, the following portions of the expansion project were opened to the public:

- Dam height increased by 34 feet (10 m) to the new height of 224 feet (68 m).
- Addition of the John Muir Interpretive Center at the north end of the reservoir;
- Provision of trails and shoreline fishing at the south end of the reservoir.

Barnard Construction Company, which was hired by CCWD to perform the reservoir expansion, employed Mechanically stabilized earth (MSE) technology to create the dam walls. Barnard subcontracted Reinforced Earth Company (RECo) to design and supply the MSE walls using its proprietary GeoMega™ MSE wall system, which utilizes precast concrete facing panels with GeoStrap® (high tenacity polymeric strips) as soil reinforcements. (Note: The GeoMega™ MSE system had previously been used in marine environments where corrosion made steel reinforcement an undesirable choice.) RECo also provided the precast concrete barrier and coping segments atop the newly expanded dam, reducing both cost and construction time for completion.

The south end of the reservoir reopened in October 2012, after revamping the marina. The storage level reached 132,900 acre-feet in 2013, before the CCWD began drawing down the level to serve user needs during the recent drought. Heavy rains in the watershed since October 2016, increased the level to more than 133,700 acre-feet (164,900,000 m^{3}) at the end of January 2017, the all-time record for the reservoir.

=== 2017 expansion proposal ===
A coalition of 12 Bay Area water agencies formally approved a study of expanding the reservoir by increasing the existing dam height by another 55 feet (17 m) to a total height of 273 feet (83 m). (Note: If implemented, the expansion would make Los Vaqueros Dam the second-tallest dam in the Bay Area. The Warm Springs Dam on Lake Sonoma near Healdsburg, California is already 319 feet (97 m) tall.) The proposed project would increase capacity of the reservoir from the present 160,000 acre-feet (200,000,000 m^{3}) to 275,000 acre-feet (339,000,000 m^{3}) at an estimated cost of $800 million.

In August 2017, the East Bay Times reported that the estimated cost of the expansion had increased from the previously announced $800 million to $914 million. It also reported that six environmental groups had written a letter of support for the proposed expansion to the California Water Commission. (Note: The Commission is scheduled to decide on whether to grant funds to this project from stat Proposition 1, which voters approved in 2014. The decision is scheduled to be madden June 2018.) Groups signing the letter included Nature Conservancy, Audubon California, Planning and Conservation League, California Waterfowl Association, Defenders of Wildlife, and Point Blue Conservation Science. If the Commission grants the funds, construction could have started in 2022 and been completed in 2026, according to the Times. By 2024, the estimated cost of the expansion had increased to nearly $1.6 billion, and the California Department of Fish and Wildlife updated the relevant permit for drawing water from the reservoir, making the requirements stricter. There was also disagreement among the eight water agencies slated to participate in the project as to which agency should shoulder the most financial risk and pay for additional cost overruns if they came up. Multiple agencies have lowered their support for the project or withdrawn from it entirely, and the board of the Contra Costa Water District told its staff to draw up papers to pull their agency out of the deal, with a formal vote expected in November 2024. The East Bay Times described this move as "the death knell for the project," which cost the eight water agencies participating in the project over $4.4 million and thousands of hours of staff time.

== Recreation ==
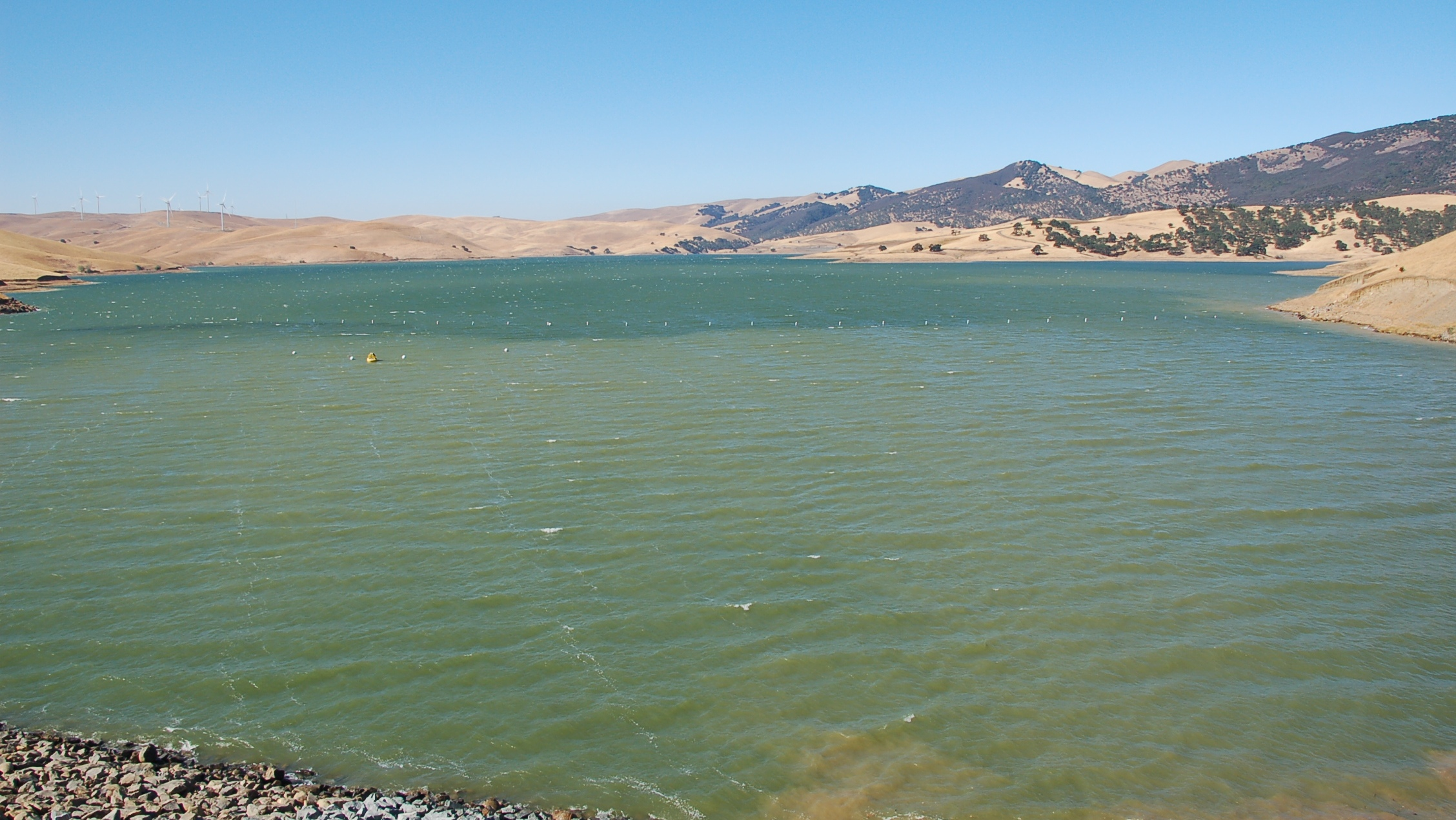
The lake has boating and fishing

Certain types of recreation are allowed on the lake. These include boating and fishing. Boats may be rented at the marina, but no boats may be brought into the watershed. Gasoline-powered boats are not allowed. Swimming and wading are forbidden.

=== Hiking trails ===
Badger Pass and Oak Savannah Loop Trail is a loop that is rated as "Hard" by all trails.com. Beginning near the north end of the lake, it is 7.9 miles (12.7 km) long and has an elevation gain of 2,125 feet (648 m). Accessible year-round for hiking, walking, nature trips and birding.

Los Vaqueros Dam Trail is rated "Moderate" for difficulty by all trails.com.

Los Vaqueros Shoreline Loop Trail is rated "Moderate" for difficulty by all trails.com.

== Watershed description ==
The Los Vaqueros watershed has been preserved as 19,300 acres (78 km^{2}) of protected open space surrounding the 1,500-acre (6.1 km^{2}) reservoir. Water is pumped into the reservoir from a Delta intake on Old River in the Sacramento-San Joaquin Delta. The intake is located just east of Discovery Bay. Water is pumped into the reservoir when salinity is low, and used for drinking water when salinity in the Delta is too high. Water from the reservoir is released via a pipeline to the 48-mile (77 km) Contra Costa Canal, which conveys water to six water treatment plants throughout the Water District's service area. The reservoir can store up to 160,000 acre-feet (200,000,000 m^{3}) of water. The earthen dam is 192 feet (59 m) high with a 1,000-foot (300 m) crest length. It is made of 2.7 million cubic yards of fill material.

The Watershed hosts the Mallory Ridge RAWS weather data collection site on the ridge above the Marina. It is maintained by the Los Vaqueros Watershed staff and linked to the National Fire Weather System.

Other benefits of the reservoir include water storage for drought or emergencies, a protected open space, and recreation. There are 55 miles (89 km) of hiking trails in the watershed. The watershed is open for fishing, hiking and other activities year-round. Electric rental boats are available, but no outside boats can be launched on the lake. No swimming is allowed in the reservoir.

== Potential for further expansion ==
An additional expansion of Los Vaqueros to a capacity of 275,000 acre-feet (339,000,000 m^{3}) is again being discussed by CCWD and other water agencies in Northern California. This goal was considered when the reservoir was first conceived, then revived in 2010 when the first expansion was being planned. Both times it was discarded because CCWD could find no other agencies who could put up sufficient money.

According to CCWD, the other public agencies that are involved as partners in current planning for the Phase III expansion are:

- Alameda County Water District
- Bay Area Water Supply and Conservation Agency
- Byron Bethany Irrigation District
- City of Brentwood
- East Bay Municipal Utility District
- East Contra Costa County Irrigation District
- Grassland Water District
- Santa Clara Valley Water District
- San Francisco Public Utilities Commission
- San Luis Delta Mendota Water Authority
- Zone 7 Water Agency

== Wildlife protection ==
Another benefit of the watershed is the protection of nearly 20,000 acres (81 km^{2}) of wildlife habitat in Eastern Contra Costa County. The watershed is home for many rare, threatened and endangered species including fairy shrimp, bald and golden eagles, Alameda whipsnake, western pond turtle, California tiger salamander, California red-legged frog, San Joaquin kit fox, and the San Francisco dusky-footed wood rat. It also provides habitat for hundreds of common plant and animal species in the area. Strict environmental commitments with State and federal agencies, and a commitment to preserving the resource help preserve this site.

As of February 17, 2017, seven of the trails on the Los Vaqueros property have been temporarily closed to protect possible golden eagle nests. Four pairs of eagles have exhibited nesting behavior, according to CCWD. The number may change during the spring. More trails may be closed, or some that have been closed may be reopened, depending on how productive the nests are. The closures typically last until late May or June, when the eaglets are fledged.

== Visiting Los Vaqueros ==
The north entrance is about 7 miles (11 km) south of Brentwood on Walnut Blvd, leading to the main parking area and is near the start of the Interpretive Center and the main hiking trails. The south entrance is off of Vasco Road, north of Livermore and leads to the marina area and four fishing piers. There is no road inside the property that connects the two entrances. Outside boats and pets may not be brought into the watershed.

== See also ==
- List of dams and reservoirs in California
- List of lakes in the San Francisco Bay Area
