= Granada High School (California) =

Public high school in California, United States

Coordinates: 37°40′29.53″N 121°47′21.75″W

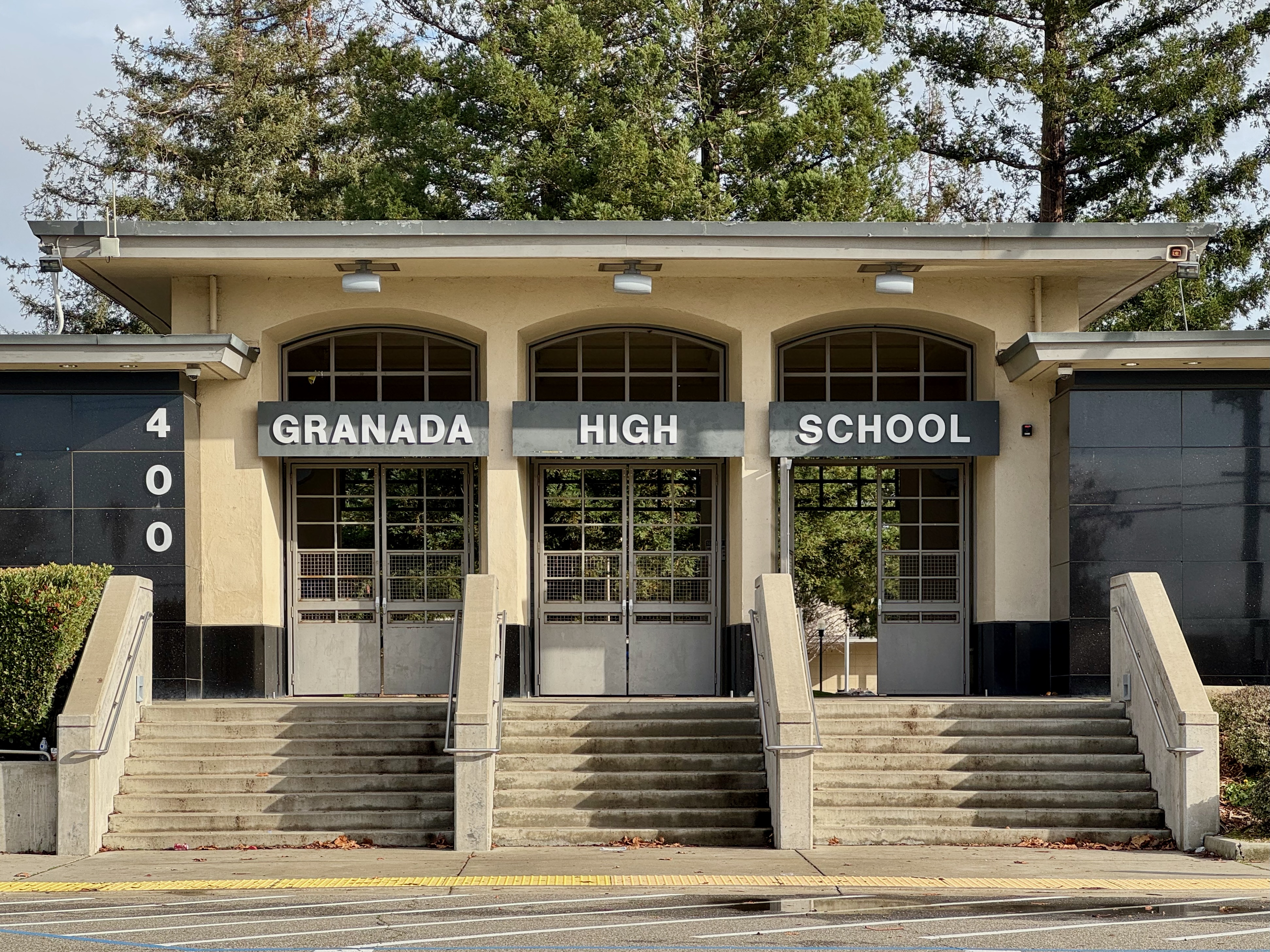
- 400 Wall Street; Livermore, California 94550; United States

Information
- Type: Public high school
- Established: 1963
- School district: Livermore Valley Joint Unified School District
- Principal: Clark Conover
- Teaching staff: 96.38 (FTE)
- Grades: 9-12
- Enrollment: 2,234 (2023-2024)
- Student to teacher ratio: 23.18
- Colors: Black and gold
- Mascot: Matador
- Newspaper: The Pomegranate
- Yearbook: El Toreador
- Website: Granada High School

Granada High School is a public high school located at 400 Wall Street in Livermore, California, United States. It is part of the Livermore Valley Joint Unified School District. Granada was established as the town's second comprehensive public high school in response to significant population growth in the 1960s. Livermore High School was the first high school in the city, and is the cross-town rival of Granada. The name Granada is a Spanish word meaning "pomegranate". The school's official newspaper is called The Pomegranate, which is published monthly. The school mascot is a matador.

== History ==
Granada High School is located in the middle of a residential district in Livermore, which changed from an agrarian community to a growing suburban community at the end of World War II. A major contributor to this change was the Lawrence Livermore National Laboratory, which started in the 1950s as a reaction to the United States' role as a nuclear power, and is still a major employer in the community. Granada was built in the 1960s in response to significant population growth (from 1950 to 1960 the population grew from 4,364 to 16,068) caused by this change. Between 1950 and 1960, Livermore's population quadrupled from 4,364 to 16,068.

The first group of students to attend Granada, who numbered about 300, chose the school's colors, its mascot, and the school song. The mascot and colors were chosen by a meeting of students, and the school song was written by the choral director. The site for the school was obtained from the Sunset Development Corporation, which agreed to give the site to the school district in lieu of paying school fees for the housing development. The name was chosen by vote and then approved.

The nearby Oak Knoll was previously a cemetery, before the 1906 San Francisco earthquake knocked over most of the headstones, torrential rains in 1907 washed away most of the western slope, and the site was subsequently abandoned for the next 50 years or so, until it was formally reclassified as a public park in 1963, and is now used by athletic programs.

Before 2001, the school had a tradition of trucks pulling large floats around the track, but after the replacement of the dirt track with all-weather material, the tradition was changed to building and performing on skit stages.

In 2023, the school removed its International Baccalaureate program, citing high cost and low student usage. After students and parents complained, questioning the district's budget numbers and interest metrics, and protesting at a board meeting, a streamlined version was reinstated.

== Schedule ==
The school initially used a 6/8 period day schedule, but soon changed to a "TUFOLD" (Time Optimization for Optimum Learning Development) schedule, which divided the day into 24 20-minute "mods" and required students to schedule their own classes.

In 1992, the school changed to a block schedule with three 90-minutes classes a day, and a fourth one-hour period to meet with teachers and complete homework. A traditional semester was completed in 9 weeks. This was modified in 1996 to be four 90 minute class periods, due to complaints and the necessity of applying for a time waiver from the state department of education due to the lack of instruction in the fourth period.

In 2008 the school again switched to the trimester system, with five 70-minute periods and a 12-week trimester, with an optional ASE (Academic Support and Enrichment) period with which to meet with teacher before school started on early-release Wednesdays.

In 2024, the school switched to a semester system again, citing relationship-building issues between teachers and students due to the short length of trimesters under the trimester system. The school uses an A/B block schedule with four approximately 90-minute class periods each day, where students are expected to take 6 classes but can take up to 8 classes per year.

== Notable alumni ==
- Louie Aguiar, former football punter
- George Atkinson III, former football running back for the Cleveland Browns and Oakland Raiders
- Josh Cooley, director of Toy Story 4
- Mark Davis, former Major League pitcher; 1989 National League Cy Young Award winner
- James DePaiva, actor
- Brandon Gonzáles, boxer
- Brian Johnson, retired soccer midfielder
- Miles Mastrobuoni, Major League baseball infielder (Tampa Bay Rays, Chicago Cubs, Seattle Mariners)
- Jimmy O’Brien (Jomboy), baseball personality
- Tony Sanchez, Former Head football Coach for UNLV
- Erick Threets, Major League relief pitcher, originally with the San Francisco Giants, and Colorado Rockies
- Jack Trudeau, former professional football player; selected by the Indianapolis Colts in the second round of the 1986 NFL Draft; quarterback from the University of Illinois' played in 10 NFL seasons, 1986-1995

== See also ==
- Alameda County high schools
