= William Mendenhall =

- Born: 1823; Greene County, Ohio
- Died: November 1911 (aged 87–88); Oakland, California
- Known for: Donating land for the town of Livermore, California

William Mendenhall was an American landowner who founded and named the city of Livermore, California in 1869.

== Biography ==
He was born in Greene County, Ohio in 1823, and grew up in the Territory of Michigan. In 1845 he moved to California with a group of several others, including Lansford Hastings. He arrived near Sutter's Fort on Christmas Day the same year. He worked for John Sutter and several others for some time until joining the California Battalion in 1846. In March of that year the battalion marched through the Livermore Valley, camping on the land of Robert Livermore, which was Mendenhall's first visit to the valley.

He married Mary Adelaide Allen in 1847. After that the family moved repeatedly; Mendenhall worked in mining, lumber, ranching, and cattle and horse-raising. At some point, he bought 650 acres of the Santa Rita grant. In 1866 he bought 608 acres of the Rancho el Valle de San José.

In 1869, he set aside 100 acres (40 ha) of his land for a townsite, creating a new town which he named Livermore, after his friend Robert Livermore. Livermore was platted and registered on November 4, 1869, as a railroad town. Mendenhall also donated 20-30 acres (the exact number is disputed) of this land to the Western Pacific Railroad, which in September 1869 placed a station on the land William Mendenhall had donated. The land for the tracks had already been signed over by Robert Livermore from his ranch in 1855, as surveyors had determined it was the best place to build.

Mendenhall built a mansion on College Ave. in 1876.

In his old age he bred Angora goats, having at one point 1,200 of them, which at the time made him the largest Angora goat breeder in California.

He died in November 1911.
