= Rancho Boga =

Mexican land grant in California

Coordinates: 39.290°N 121.650°W

Rancho Boga was a 22,185-acre (89.78 km^{2}) Mexican land grant in present-day Butte County and Sutter County, California given in 1844 by Governor Manuel Micheltorena to Charles William Flügge. The grant extended south from present-day Gridley along the west bank of the Feather River across from fellow German, Theodore Cordua's Rancho Honcut, and encompassed present-day Live Oak.

== History ==
Charles W. Flügge, born in Germany came to California with the Bartleson-Bidwell Party in 1841. He became John Sutter's friend and served as his legal adviser, business manager, and representative. He was granted the five square league Rancho Boga in 1844. Sutter and Flügge had a falling out over a land dispute in 1845, and Flügge went to Los Angeles and established himself in retail business with James McKinley. He became enamored of Adelaida Johnson who eventually married Francis Mellus. In 1852 Flügge wandered off and his dead body was found several days after he was missing.

Thomas O. Larkin (1802–1858) bought Rancho Boga from Flügge.

With the cession of California to the United States following the Mexican-American War, the 1848 Treaty of Guadalupe Hidalgo provided that the land grants would be honored. As required by the Land Act of 1851, a claim for Rancho Boga was filed with the Public Land Commission in 1852, and the grant was patented to Thomas O. Larkin in 1865. A second claim was filed by Leonace Hoover, as administrator, but was rejected.

Larkin failed in an effort to have it located in the mining regions. Rancho Boga, on the Feather River, was thought to be so rich in gold that Larkin eventually offered it on the London market for $1 million. In 1873, a conflict between the north boundary of Rancho Boga and the south boundary of the 1846 Rancho Fernandez grant went to the US Supreme Court.
