= Laddville, California =

Coordinates: 37°41′5.79″N 121°45′45.17″W

Laddville (or "Laddsville") is a former settlement in the western Livermore Valley of Alameda County, California, United States.

It was located east of the settlement which eventually became Livermore.

== History ==
Alphonso Ladd settled in the Sunol Valley in 1850. After preempting some land he established a hotel in 1855, and the community that grew up surrounding the hotel became Laddville. A saloon was opened, and then in 1865 a store followed. Both a private school and, subsequently, a public school were opened in 1866. In 1868, a general store, restaurant, and livery stable were established. After 1868, Laddsville grew quickly.

Ladd's original hotel had burned down in 1867. When the railroad was built through the Livermore Valley in August 1869, the station was placed west of Laddville near the nascent Livermore. Laddsville was almost entirely destroyed by a fire in 1871, and the businesses within were merged into Livermore, whose city limits later grew to include its former location.

== See also ==
- Former settlements in Alameda County, California
- List of cities and towns in California
- Livermore, California
