= Contra Costa Canal =

Aqueduct in California, United States

Coordinates: 37.986867°N 121.724120°W

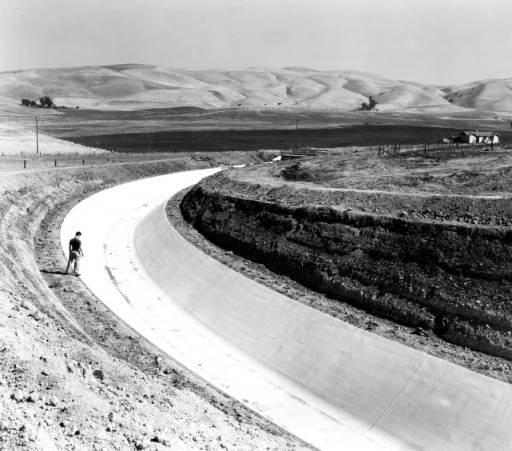
Contra Costa Canal in 1940

The Contra Costa Canal is a 47 mi (76 km) aqueduct in the US state of California. Its construction began in 1937, with delayed completion until 1948 due to World War II shortages in labor and materials. A portion of the canal's right of way has been developed as the Contra Costa Canal Regional Trail, a biking and walking trail, and is managed by the East Bay Regional Park District.

== Canal uses ==
The Contra Costa Canal is used for agricultural, industrial, and municipal water purposes. Due to the water used for water supply for different cities, the canal is fenced off from the public. The canal provides water for the largest urban contractor of the Central Valley Project, the Contra Costa Water District. It is part of the Central Valley Project managed by the United States Bureau of Reclamation to divert Sacramento-San Joaquin Delta water from Rock Slough as far as Martinez, California in Central Contra Costa County.

== Canal management ==
=== Contra Costa Water District ===
Distributes water from the canal to:

- Antioch
- Bay Point
- Clyde
- Concord
- Knightsen
- Martinez
- Oakley
- Pacheco
- Pittsburg
- Pleasant Hill
- Walnut Creek

=== Los Vaqueros Reservoir ===
Fish Screen at Contra Costa Canal

Los Vaqueros Reservoir is an off-stream water storage passed in 1988 by voters to store water from the canal for purposes to improve water quality.

=== Contra Loma Reservoir ===
A 2,000 acre-foot reservoir built in Antioch as an emergency supply for Contra Costa Canal.

=== Inline canal water screens ===
An inline canal water screen was installed to remove debris including moss, grass, hyacinth, and tumbleweeds.

== Social impact ==
A three-day water arrival celebration from Contra Costa Canal to the City of Pittsburg was held in 1940. Per the Canal's link to the city, Pittsburg became desirable due to its drinkable water, resulting in building of homes and increasing population in the area. Local citizens were satisfied with the new arrangement because of the increase of water quality that exceeded their local water reserves.

== Public concerns ==
=== Accidents and prevention ===
Eight people have drowned since 2000, causes ranging from trespassing to car accidents. Many people drown due to falling into the canal and having trouble getting out because the canal has a steep build and the sides are slippery. The water current reaches up to 12 mph, and can take people through areas of 6–8 feet of depth, and 18 feet wide. Ways to stop trespassing and reduce deaths in the canal include putting up chain link fences around the canal, placement of warning signs, childhood education, pamphlet distribution, phone numbers to report people, and handing out fines from $25-$500. However, people still jump or cut fences to get into canal for all different kinds of activities.

=== Safety education ===
The Contra Costa Water District has created and uploaded a video on YouTube and on their site named “Staying Safe Along the Contra Costa Canal” for public viewing. Safety drills are held to train canal workers in rescuing people from the canal in case of an emergency. There are also canal patrol officers.

=== Recreation ===
==== Contra Costa Canal Trail ====
The trail runs along the Contra Costa Canal through central Costa County, connecting regional trails. It connects schools, commercial areas, and public transportation. It was created by Contra Costa Water District, Bureau of Reclamation and the Park District. It is publicly accessible by bikers, runners, pedestrians, and equestrians.

== Wildlife ==
Fish, crawdads, geese, ducks, egrets, muskrats, beavers, otters, and wild pigs have been spotted in the canal.
