= Rancho Fernandez =

Mexican land grant in California

Coordinates: 39.510°N 121.600°W

Rancho Fernandez was a 17,806-acre (72.06 km^{2}) Mexican land grant in present-day Butte County, California given to Dionisio Zenon Fernandez and Máximo Zenon Fernandez in 1846 by Governor Pío Pico. The grant extended along the west bank of the Feather River, and encompassed present-day Oroville and Thermalito.

== History ==
The four square league grant was made to brothers Dionisio Z. Fernandez and Máximo Z. Fernandez who were sons of José Zenon Fernandez, grantee of Rancho Quito.

With the cession of California to the United States following the Mexican-American War, the 1848 Treaty of Guadalupe Hidalgo provided that the land grants would be honored. As required by the Land Act of 1851, a claim for Rancho Fernandez was filed with the Public Land Commission in 1852, and the grant was patented to Dionisio Z. Fernandez, Máximo Z. Fernandez, Josiah Belden, and William R. Basham in 1867.

In 1873, a conflict between the north boundary of the 1844 Flügge Rancho Boga grant and the south boundary of Rancho Fernandez went to the US Supreme Court.

== See also ==
- Ranchos of Butte County, California
- Ranchos of California
