= Livermore Carnegie Library and Park =

- U.S. National Register of Historic Places
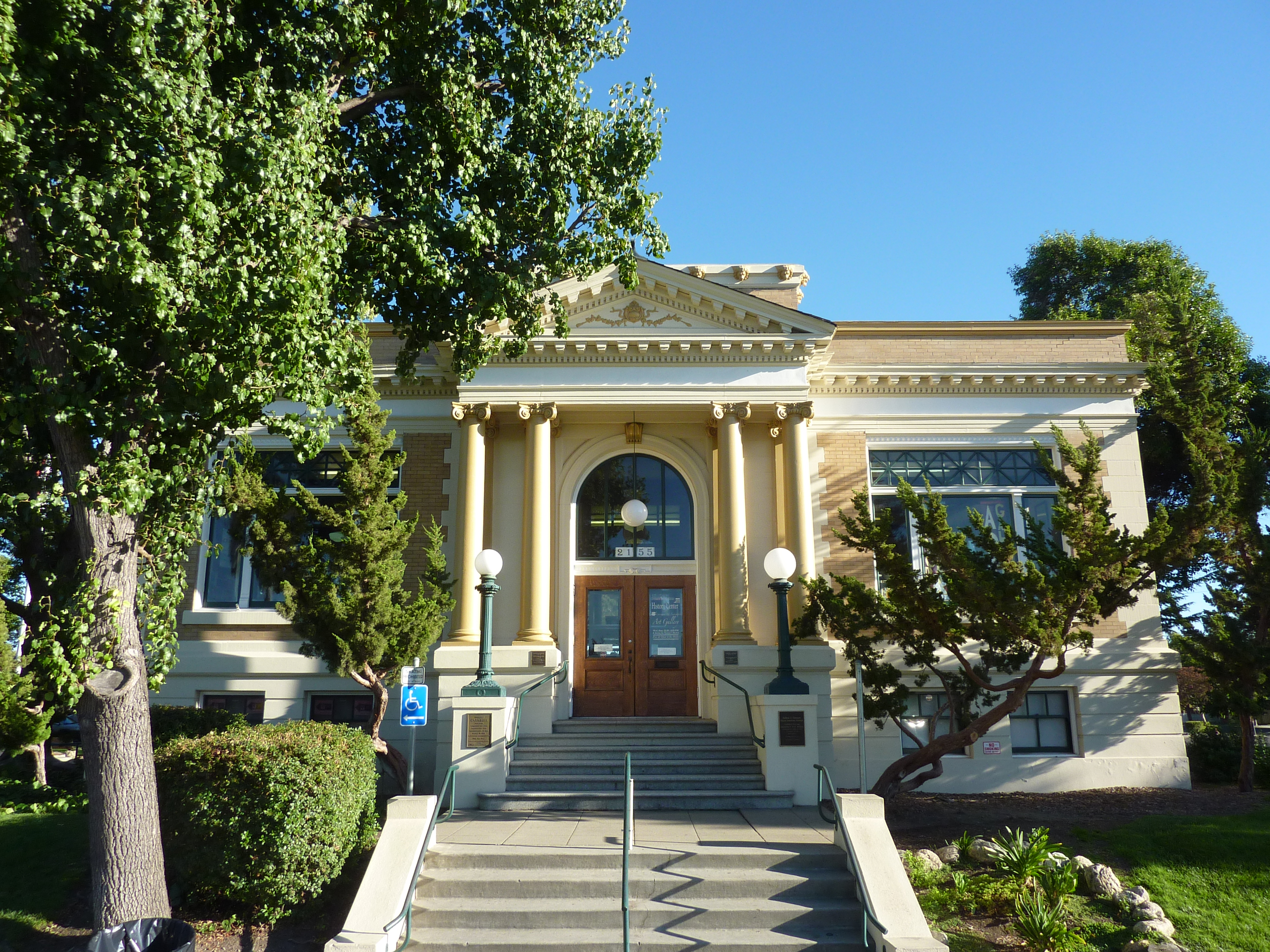
- 3rd Street Entrance to Carnegie Building
- Location: Livermore, Alameda County, California, United States
- Coordinates: 37°40′47″N 121°46′07″W
- Built: 1911
- Architect: William H. Weeks
- Architectural style: Classical Revival (Temple style)
- NRHP reference No.: 11000876
- Added to NRHP: 2011

The Carnegie Library at Livermore, California, opened in 1911 and continued in use as a library until 1966. It now hosts a historical museum and art gallery. The building was designed by William H. Weeks in the Greek Revival style and is included on the National Register of Historic Places. A weekly farmers' market takes place in the surrounding park.

== History ==
The first Livermore Library was organized in 1875 by the Livermore Library and Dramatic Association. It initially had a collection of 250 books. Members of the public were asked to pay three dollars a year for a family membership (or twenty dollars for a lifetime membership) for the privilege of borrowing books. In 1878, the Livermore Public Library Association was organized to manage the operation. This association raised funds to build a library building, but closed in 1887, after public interest waned. (Note: This original library building was at 2136 First Street. It still stands and now houses a beauty salon.) The books were stored in the local newspaper office.

The Livermore Ladies League of Progress reopened the library in 1896, naming it the Livermore Free Library. They created a new "corporation of public benefit" and sold shares to purchase the former library building. In 1901, the city took over the free library and put it under municipal control and financial support. (Note: Livermore was the first California city to take advantage of the new state law that permitted this.) By then, the library's inventory had grown to 3,500 books.

Led by Mrs. Dell C. Savage, president of the library board, Livermore began its campaign to obtain a library grant from the Carnegie Foundation in 1908. A formal application was made and a grant of $10,000 was approved that year. The city agreed to match the grant by providing $1,000 per year for ten years, provide land for the building, and support the operation with tax money. A bond election was scheduled for December 17, 1909. The election passed easily, supported by the San Francisco Chronicle and the Livermore Valley Improvement Association. The city purchased a 1.83-acre (7,400 m^{2}) site at Third Street and L street for $9,000. The plot was formerly the site of the Peter McKeany corral and slaughterhouse.

The new building opened in 1911 and continued to serve as the main public library until 1966, when the city built a new central library in the Civic Center on South Livermore Street. The original structure, which was built in the Classical Revival architectural style, still stands and now houses the Livermore Heritage Guild's History Center and Museum. The building sits in the middle of a square block of parkland bounded by 3rd Street on the north, J street on the east, 4th Street on the south, and K street on the west. The park is the site of a weekly farmers' market that draws many visitors who buy locally grown produce and listen to music performed by local artists. The building and park are managed by the Livermore Area Parks and Recreation District (LARPD).

== Building description ==
The building was designed by William H. Weeks and approved by Carnegie prior to the award of the grant. Weeks designed more than 20 Carnegie Libraries in California. He also designed the decorative fountain at the foot of the library entrance steps. Hoyt Brothers were paid $10,640 to construct the building. Several Livermore residents and local farmers furnished volunteer labor to assist the construction effort.

=== Exterior ===
The architectural style is Greek Revival, Temple style. It is one story high with a full basement, and almost square, with dimensions of 45 by 47 feet (14 by 14 m). The walls were built of locally made buff brick, sheathed with terra cotta and plaster. (Note: The bricks were supplied by Carnegie Brick and Pottery Company, whose plant was located in Corral Hollow, San Joaquin County, California. The brick plant was built in 1903 and closed after a disastrous flood in 1911.) There are light colored quoins at the corners, projections and foundation that provide contrast with the yellow walls. A low parapet around the roof line is decorated with large dentils. The center of the roof is raised and shows ornamental lions on one side of the building.

A central portico, decorated with a pediment that is supported by two pairs of Greek Ionic columns, frames the main entrance (on the Third Street side). The entrance is wooden double doors with glass panels. A rounded clear glass arch sits above the doors.

=== Interior ===
The main floor was divided into four areas. The largest was called the Reference Room, which contained shelves of books, chairs and tables, and covered the east side of the building. The west side had two corner rooms used as offices and a large foyer. The library desk was directly across the foyer from the entrance. The basement had a large 26-by-28-foot (7.9 by 8.5 m) area designated as the Children's Reading Room, plus two small offices and a service area.

The interior of the building has been maintained as it was built, except for modernization of plumbing, addition of emergency exit doors, installation of an exterior elevator and a concrete ramp. (Note: The latter two mandated by Federal regulations, subsequent to the Americans with Disabilities Act of 1990.)

=== Park ===
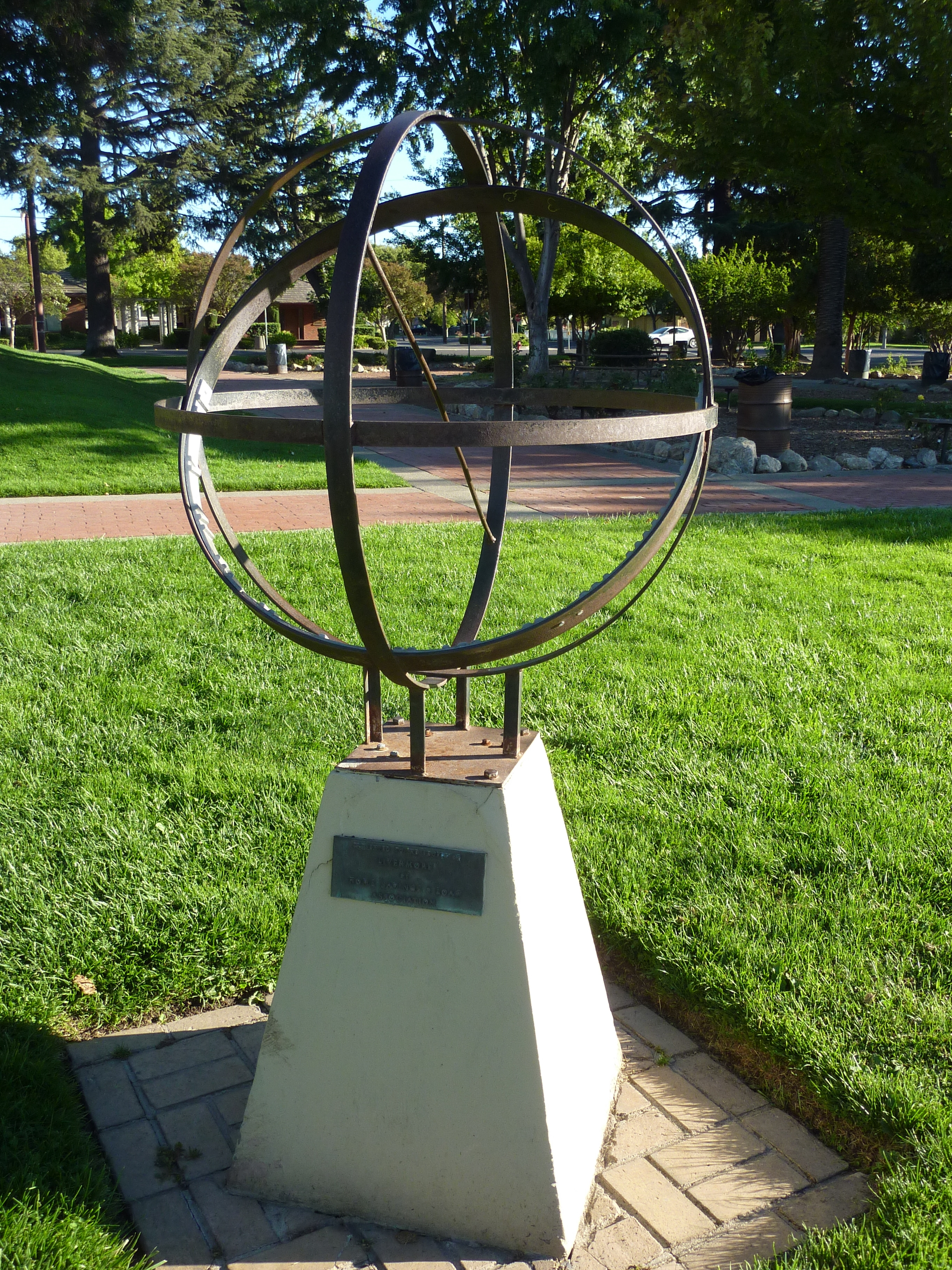

The Livermore Herald donated a sundial and several street lamps for installation in the park. Architect Weeks designed the decorative fountain that stands in front of the entrance. It is made of Colusa sandstone with a carved bowl 5.1667 feet (1.5748 m) in diameter, over which water flows into an octagonal basin that is 14 feet (4.3 m) in diameter. (Note: Colusa sandstone is a moderately soft greywacke sandstone found in Colusa County, California. It is fine, medium grain and blue-gray colored; frequently used in San Francisco, California architecture.) It has remained in operation since it was installed in May 1911.

Park landscaping has undergone a number of changes since its creation. Two tiers of concrete steps connect the park elevation with the main building entrance. A World War II memorial plaque was installed at the southeast corner of the park in 1946. The 60-foot (18 m) tall flagpole that was formerly at the intersection of Livermore Avenue and First Street was relocated to Carnegie Park and erected beside the plaque. The east and west ends of the park contain picnic tables that were installed late in the 20th century.

== Current status of Carnegie building ==
The Livermore Historical Guild and the Livermore Arts Association have shared use of the former library building since 1974. The building and its surrounding park were added to the National Register of Historic Places in 2011, with reference number 11000876.
