= Robert Livermore =

Early California settler

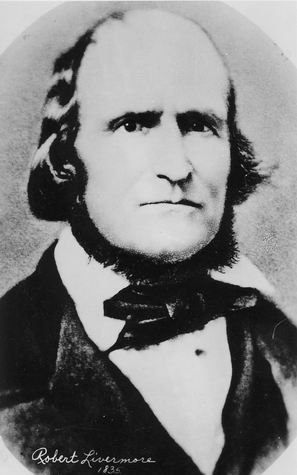
- Born: c. 3 November 1799; Springfield, Essex, England
- Died: 14 February 1858 (aged 58); Alameda County, California
- Citizenship: England, Mexico
- Occupation: Rancher
- Known for: Namesake of Livermore, California
- Spouse: Maria Josefa de Jesus Higuera Molina (1838–1858, ending in his death)

Robert Thomas Livermore, also known as Don Roberto Livermore, (c. 3 November 1799 (Note: He was christened on 15 December 1799 at the age of six weeks.) – 14 February 1858) was an English-born Californian ranchero. He emigrated to Alta California in 1822, eventually becoming a Mexican citizen and a prominent landowner in the Bay Area.

== Biography ==
He was born in Springfield, Essex in England, to Robert Livermore and Mary Cudworth. Livermore was a stonemason's apprentice as a youth. At the age of 17, he decided to go to sea, joining the crew of an English merchant ship. Arriving in Baltimore, Maryland, he enlisted in the United States Navy and traveled to South America. He subsequently was part of Lord Cochrane's crew in 1820 during the Peruvian War of Independence against Spain. After Peru, he signed on with an English trading ship bound for California.

In 1822, he deserted from his ship in San Pedro, where he met another British ship-jumper - the Scot John Gilroy (namesake of the city of Gilroy). At that time, there were only a handful of English-speakers in Alta California, and Livermore probably also met the American Joseph John Chapman.

Livermore worked for a time at Mission San Gabriel and then moved north, working as the mayordomo (ranch foreman) at Rancho Bolsa del Potrero y Moro Cojo of Joaquín de la Torre, near Castroville. On 20 June 1823, Robert was baptized at the Mission Santa Clara into the Catholic faith, given the name Juan Bautista Roberto y José. At about the same time, in Monterey, he requested and was given permission by Governor Pablo Vicente de Solá to remain in California.

In 1834 Livermore and his business partner José Noriega were keeping livestock at Rancho Las Positas, where they also built an adobe. They purchased half of the land grant from William Gulnac in 1837, and officially received the grant in 1839 (technically, the land was granted to Salvio Pacheco and then sold to Livermore, as he was not a Mexican citizen). The only other inhabitant of the area at the time, besides the Ohlone, was José Amador (his rancho was near the present city of Dublin), who received his land grant a short time earlier. Livermore and Amador both helped each other build their adobes.

On 5 May 1838, Livermore married the widow Maria Josefa de Jesus Higuera Molina (1815–1879), daughter of Jose Loreto Higuera, grantee of Rancho Los Tularcitos, at the Mission San José. Josefa's grandfather, Ygnacio Higuera had been a member of Gaspar de Portolà's Expedition Sancta in 1769 and had accompanied Juan Bautista de Anza in his expedition of 1775–76. They first settled in the Sunol Valley, but later moved to Las Positas, as he was making regular trips there to manage his rancho. Initially an adobe structure built by Livermore and Amador served as their house on the rancho. In 1850, a wooden two-story house was shipped around Cape Horn and became the Livermores' new home. Later the adobe structure was rented to Nathaniel Greene Patterson who used it as a small hotel, the first place of entertainment in the valley.

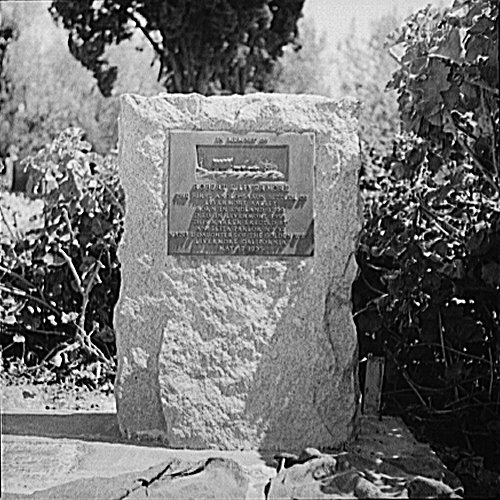
Livermore's grave marker in 1942, during the time his real grave was lost.

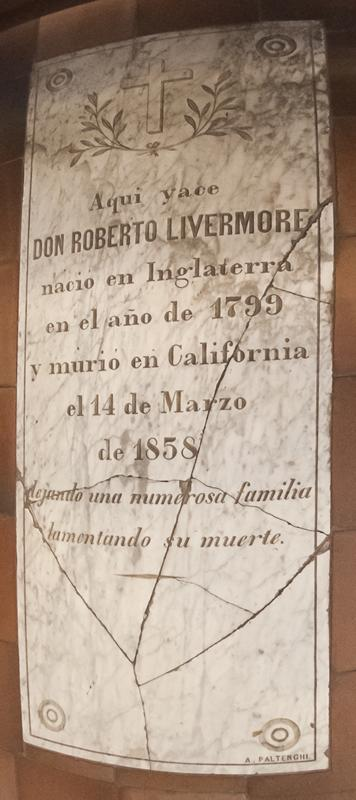
Livermore's grave marker currently in the mission floor, showing a death date 14 March 1858.

The rancho's economy was based on cattle, hides, and tallow, as well as agriculture. Livermore planted the first wine grapes in the area and today, the Livermore Valley is one of California's premier wine-growing regions.

Livermore studiously avoided involvement in politics, and all evidence indicates he got along well with both the Mexican and Anglo communities, even becoming a Mexican citizen in 1844. His only participation in the events surrounding the conquest of California was to help carry word from Commodore John Drake Sloat to John C. Frémont at Sutter's Fort that Monterey had been occupied by American forces, and that may have been partly motivated by the fact that Noriega had been captured during the Bear Flag Revolt and was being held at Sutter's Fort.

During the California Gold Rush, Livermore made no attempt to join the miners. Instead, in 1847 he and Noriega had purchased Rancho Cañada de Los Vaqueros and added it to their holdings. Their lands were on the route from the southern San Francisco Bay Area to the goldfields and so, a post office was established there in 1851, operating for two years. He was known for his generosity and hospitality to passers-by, so much that the area became known as "Livermore's Valley". When Alameda County, California, was formed in 1853, Livermore was appointed supervisor of roads in the county. In 1854 he purchased Noriega's half of Rancho Las Positas and deeded his half of Rancho Cañada de los Vaqueros to Noriega.

== Death and legacy ==
When Livermore died in 1858, he left behind Maria Josefa and eight children. He was buried at Mission San José, but his grave was "lost" for over 100 years. The 1868 Hayward earthquake destroyed the church and it was replaced by a wooden structure. When that was torn down in 1981, workers discovered his original grave marker.

The city of Livermore, California is named after Livermore. Robert Livermore never lived there, but William Mendenhall had met Livermore as part of Frémont's expedition, and he named it after him when Mendenhall founded the town in 1869. The city is the site of the Lawrence Livermore National Laboratory, for which the 116th element of the periodic table, livermorium, was named. A cultivar of walnut is also named 'Robert Livermore'.

The Livermore Memorial Monument, located in Portola Park in Livermore, serves as a memorial. It is listed as a California Historical Landmark.
