= Livermore Valley Joint Unified School District =

School district in Livermore, California

Address
- 685 East Jack London Blvd. Livermore, Alameda County, California, 94551; United States
- Coordinates: 37°41′19.99″N 121°47′29.02″W

District information
- Grades: K–12
- Superintendent: Dr. Anthony Limoges

Other information
- Website: https://www.livermoreschools.org/

Livermore Valley Joint Unified School District (LVJUSD) is a public school district located in Livermore, California, United States. It is located in Alameda County. As of July 2026, the superintendent is Dr. Anthony Limoges, and the school board is composed of Deena Kaplanis, Christiaan VandenHeuvel, Steven Drouin, Emily Prusso, and Craig Bueno. 12,956 students enrolled in schools in the district in the 2022-2023 school year.

In addition to Livermore, it includes a portion of Dublin and a very small portion of Pleasanton. The district has a $138 parcel tax, last renewed in 2022 for seven years.

== Schools ==
The district operates 19 schools: nine elementary (K–5) schools, three middle (6-8) schools, two TK-8 schools, two comprehensive high schools and two alternative high schools. There previously were also two charter schools in the area, one K-8 and one high school, as well as a third alternative high school. Both of the charter schools were operated by the Tri-Valley Learning Corporation, a local 501(c)3 not-for-profit organization founded by parents and teachers, until they closed due to conflicts of interest and fiscal problems within the corporation. The third alternative high school, Phoenix High, closed in 2013, having previously shared a building with Del Valle High. As of 2024, the schools currently open in the district are:

=== Elementary ===
- Altamont Creek Elementary School
- Arroyo Seco Elementary School
- Emma C. Smith Elementary School
- Jackson Avenue Elementary School
- Lawrence Elementary School
- Leo R. Croce Elementary School
- Marylin Avenue STEAM Academy
- Rancho Las Positas Elementary School
- Sunset Elementary School

=== TK-8 ===
- Joe Michell TK-8 School
- Junction Avenue TK-8 School

=== Middle ===
- Christensen Middle School
- East Avenue Middle School
- William Mendenhall Middle School

=== High ===
- Del Valle Continuation High School
- Granada High School
- Livermore High School
- Vineyard Alternative School, an alternative independent study school

=== Adult Education ===
- Livermore Adult Education
