= Contra Costa Water District =

The Contra Costa Water District (CCWD) is an agency that was created in 1936 to supply water for consumers in eastern Contra Costa, California. It is now one of the largest water districts in California, serving about 500,000 people in Central and Eastern Contra Costa County.

== History ==
The formation of CCWD was a direct result of a 13-year drought that began in California around 1917 and caused a great increase of salinity in Sacramento Delta as ocean water intruded and mixed with greatly reduced flow of fresh water from inland runoff. Fresh water for industrial use had to be brought in from elsewhere in railroad tank cars. Farmers could not afford the expense of importing water, and had to stop irrigating crops, which caused the value of land to decline.

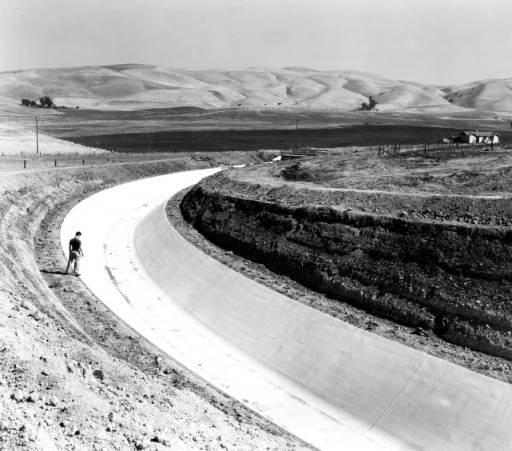
Contra Costa Canal view in 1940.

A citizens' group calling itself the Bay Barrier Association was formed to lobby for a solution to the problem of seawater intrusion. At first the group favored building a physical barrier, but later concluded the scheme was impractical. They retained attorney Thomas Carlson to work with the Legislature, which passed a state water plan in 1931. The plan included a "Contra Costa Conduit,"(later named the Contra Costa Canal). The California Central Valley Project Act authorizing construction of structures and waterways including the Contra Costa Canal was passed in 1933 and approved by Governor James Rolph. However, the Great Depression made it impossible to build the infrastructure by selling bonds.

Carlson and his team of canal supporters went to Washington, D. C. to lobby the U. S. government for funding. Their efforts were successful, although it took three years. In August 1937, the US Bureau of Reclamation (BuRec) announced that it would fund the Central Valley Project. A groundbreaking ceremony for the Contra Costa Canal occurred in Oakley, California on November 7, 1937. (Note: The canal was built in segments, and in 1940, it delivered its first water to Pittsburg.) Despite delays caused by demands for labor and materials needed of World War II, the 48 miles (77 km) long tunnel was completed in 1948, from the Delta intake on Rock Slough (near Knightsen) to Martinez.

The Bay Barrier Association started planning for a Contra Costa County Water District, a legal entity to buy and distribute untreated water that would be furnished by the BuRec. Formation of the CCCWD was approved by county voters by a large margin on May 5, 1936, and incorporated as a special district on May 9, 1936. Its customers would be cities, farms and industries. These customers were responsible for treating the water so it would be safe for their own customers.

The privately owned California Water Service Company became a buyer of CCCWD water In 1951. Later CCCWD bought all of CWSCs holdings in Contra Costa County, including its treatment, pumping, storage and distribution facilities. In 1961, CCCWD took responsibility for water service in the central part of Contra Costa County.

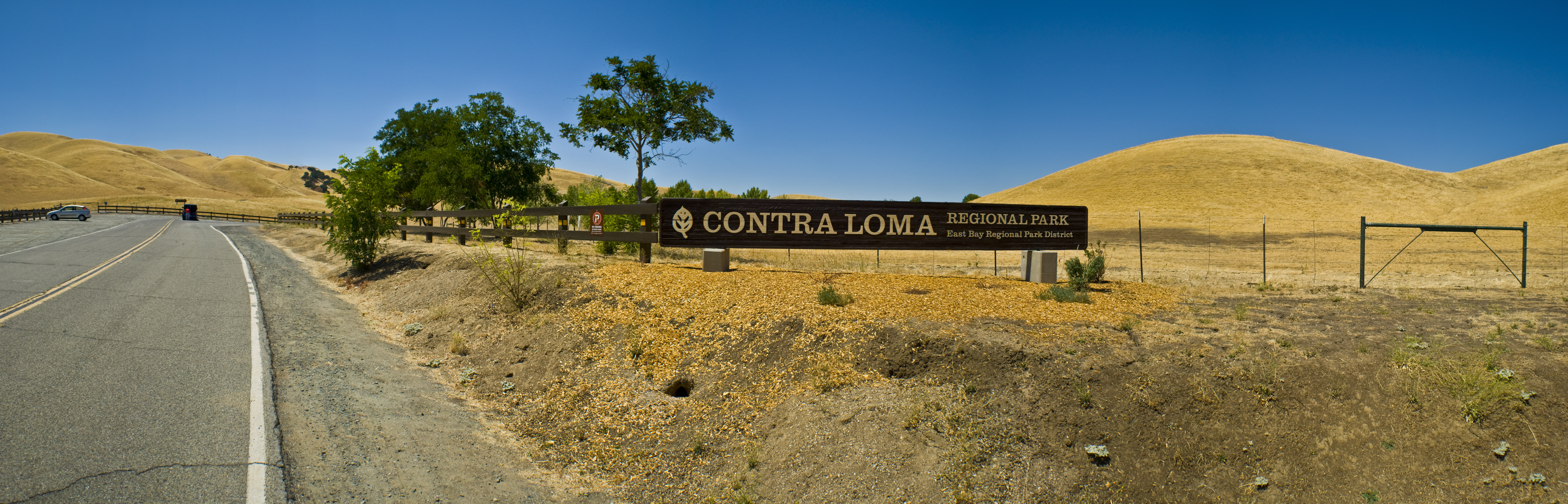
Contra Loma sign September 13, 2010

In 1965, CCWD broke ground to construct the Contra Loma Reservoir in Antioch. It was designed with a capacity of 2,000 acre-feet (2,500,000 m^{3}) to serve for peak storage and emergency supply for the Contra Costa Canal.

In 1966, CCWD began construction of the Bollman Water Treatment Plant in Concord. It is now the largest treatment plant in the district, with a capacity to treat 75 MGD.

The District Center office building constructed in Concord during 1971 consolidated many of CCWD's offices and maintenance facilities in one location. The building was subsequently named for Thomas Carlson, who led the formation of the District.

In 1988, CCWD sought voter approval of the Los Vaqueros proposal that included building a 100,000 acre-feet (120,000,000 m^{3}) reservoir inside a 20,000 acres (81,000,000 m^{2}) watershed. The voters approved the project, then estimated to cost $800 million. After completing the engineering work, ground was broken for construction in 1994, and the project completed in 1998. (Note: The Los Vaqueros Reservoir was the largest project ever undertaken by CCWD. It is now the largest water reservoir in the Bay Area.)

CCWD expanded the Los Vaqueros Reservoir to a capacity of 160,000 acre-feet (200,000,000 m^{3}) in 2011 by extending the height of the dam. The expansion was completed in 2012.

CCWD built the Randall-Bold Water Treatment Plant in Oakley in 1992 to treat water using ozone disinfection technology. (Note: The Randall-Bold facility is jointly owned by CCWD and the Diablo Water District.) The plant was expanded in 2007, and now has a design capacity of 50 MGD, and is expandable to 80 MGD. The facility includes an on-site underground 5,000,000 US gallons (19,000 m^{3}) storage reservoir for treated water.

Fish Screen at Rock Slough on Contra Costa Canal. September 19, 2011 Photo by U.S. Bureau of Reclamation

== Governance ==
=== Board of directors ===
CCWD is governed by five directors, each of whom is elected from a division that contains approximately 110,000 persons and serves a four-year term. Candidates for director positions must be registered voters, and must reside within the district which they represent. The elections are held in November, every two years on even-numbered years. CCWD director elections follow the same schedule as the statewide office elections.

Current Directors, as of 2023, are:

- Patt Young, Director, Division 1
- John A. Burgh, Director, Division 2
- Ernesto A. Avila, P.E., President, Division 3
- Antonio Martinez, Vice President, Division 4
- Connstance Holdaway, Director, Division 5

== See also ==
- Contra Costa Canal
