= Rancho Las Positas =

Mexican land grant in California

Coordinates: 37.670°N 121.770°W

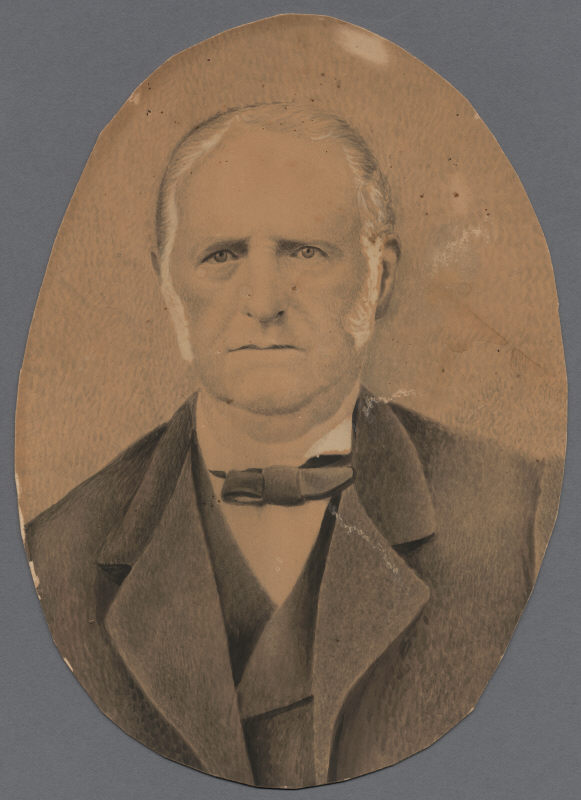
Don José Noriega was granted Rancho Las Positas, in conjunction with Robert Livermore, in 1839.

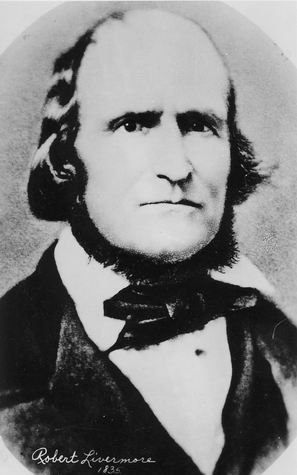
Robert Livermore, also known as Don Roberto Livermore, was granted Rancho Las Positas, in conjunction with José Noriega, in 1839

Rancho Las Positas was a 8,880-acre (35.9 km^{2}) Mexican land grant in present-day Alameda County, California given in 1839 by governor Juan Alvarado to Robert Livermore and José Noriega. Las Positas means "little watering holes" in Spanish. The rancho included the present-day city of Livermore.

== History ==
In 1834 Livermore and his business partner José Noriega were keeping livestock at Rancho Las Positas, where they also built an adobe. Livermore and his wife Josefa Higuera Molina, first settled in the Sunol Valley, but later moved to Rancho Las Positas, as Livermore was making regular trips there to manage his rancho. Initially an adobe structure built by Livermore and Amador served as their house on the rancho.

With the cession of California to the United States following the Mexican-American War, the 1848 Treaty of Guadalupe Hidalgo provided that the land grants would be honored. As required by the Land Act of 1851, a claim for Rancho Las Positas was filed with the Public Land Commission in 1852, and the grant was patented to Livermore and Noriega in 1872.

In 1847 José Noriega and Robert Livermore also purchased Rancho Canada de los Vaqueros to the north of Rancho Las Positas. In 1854, Livermore and Noriega came to an agreement to separate their properties. Livermore purchased Noriega's half of Rancho Las Positas and sold his half of Rancho Canada de los Vaqueros to Noreiga. But Livermore had already conveyed all his interest in Rancho Canada de los Vaqueros to his wife and children in 1852, of which fact Noriega was ignorant; so that the deed from Livermore to Noriega in fact conveyed nothing, inasmuch as Livermore had then no title to convey. This was the beginning of several lawsuits. When Livermore died in 1858, before the establishment of the town that bears his name, he left behind Josefa and eight children.

== Historic sites of the Rancho ==
The first building on the ranch was an adobe on Las Positas Creek, and in 1849 a two-story house was added; it was the first wooden building in the valley.

== See also ==
- Ranchos of Alameda County, California
