= José Noriega =

Spanish-born Californio politician

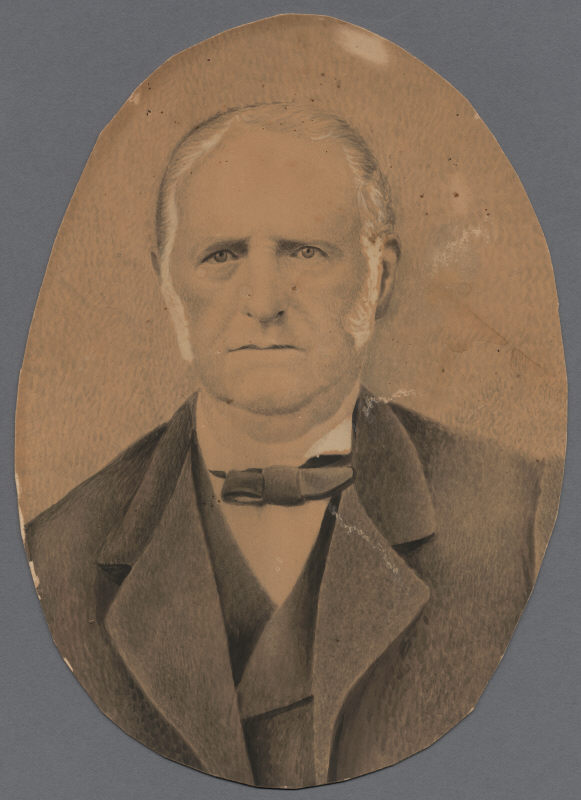
- Portrait c. 1850

Alcalde of San José
- In office 1839
- Preceded by: Dolores Pacheco
- Succeeded by: Dolores Pacheco

Personal details
- Born: 19 March 1796 Asturias, Spain
- Died: 30 May 1869 (aged 83) San Jose, California
- Profession: Ranchero, alcalde

Don José Noriega (March 19, 1796 – May 30, 1869) was a Spanish-born Californio ranchero and politician. He served as Alcalde of San José (mayor) and was a prominent landowner in the San Francisco Bay Area.

== Biography ==
Noriega was born on 19 March 1796 in Asturias, Spain. He emigrated to Alta California as part of the Híjar-Padrés colony in 1834.

Noriega served as Alcalde of San José (mayor) for a one term in 1839.

Noriega was the grantee of numerous rancho grants, including Rancho Los Méganos in 1835, Rancho Las Positas in 1839, and Rancho Quito in 1841. He purchased Rancho Cañada de los Vaqueros in 1847.

He died on 30 May 1869 and is buried at Oak Hill Memorial Park.

== Personal life ==
He was married to Manuela Fernández de Noriega, daughter of José Zenon Fernandez, who also came with Híjar-Padrés colony in 1834. They had one daughter Enedina Noriega, who was married to José Villar.
