= Livermore, California =

City in California, United States

- City
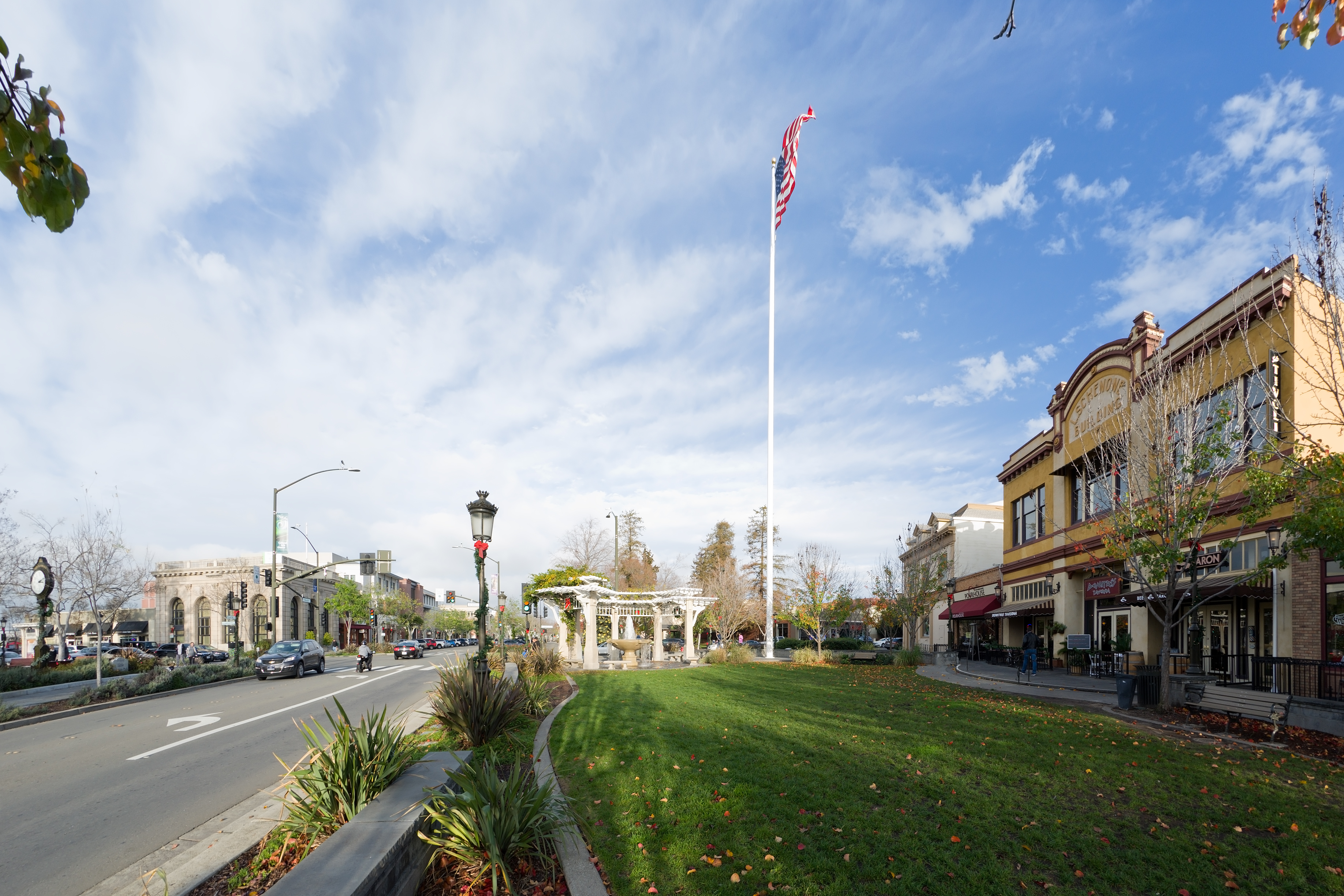
- Downtown Livermore

- Flag Logo
- Interactive map of Livermore, California
- Location of Livermore Livermore, California (California) Livermore, California (the United States)
- Coordinates: 37°40′55″N 121°46′05″W
- Country: United States
- State: California
- County: Alameda
- Established: 1869
- Incorporated: April 1, 1876
- Named for: Robert Livermore

Government
  - Type: Council–manager
  - Mayor: John Marchand
  - City manager: Marianna Burch
  - U.S. representative: Aisha Wahab
  - State senator: Jerry McNerney
  - State assembly member: Rebecca Bauer-Kahan

Area
  - City: 26.45 sq mi (68.50 km^{2})
  - Land: 26.44 sq mi (68.49 km^{2})
  - Water: 0.0039 sq mi (0.01 km^{2}) 0.010%
- Elevation: 495 ft (151 m)

Population (2020)
  - City: 87,955
  - Density: 3,326/sq mi (1,284/km^{2})
  - Urban: 240,381 (US: 167th)
  - Urban density: 3,683.5/sq mi (1,422.2/km^{2})
- Time zone: UTC−8 (Pacific)
  - Summer (DST): UTC−7 (PDT)
- ZIP codes: 94550, 94551
- Area code: 925
- FIPS code: 06-41992
- GNIS feature IDs: 277542, 2410848
- Website: www.livermoreca.gov

Livermore is a city in Alameda County, California, United States. With a 2020 population of 87,955, Livermore is the most populous city in the Tri-Valley, giving its name to the Livermore Valley. It is located on the eastern edge of California's San Francisco Bay Area.

Livermore was a railroad town named for Robert Livermore, a local rancher who settled in the area in the 1840s. It is the home of the Lawrence Livermore National Laboratory, for which the chemical element livermorium is named (and thus, placing the city's name in the periodic table). It is also the California site of Sandia National Laboratories, which is headquartered in Albuquerque, New Mexico. Its south side is home to local vineyards, and its downtown district is being redeveloped as of 2024.

The United States Census Bureau defines an urban area of Tri-Valley-area cities, with Livermore as the principal city: the Livermore–Pleasanton–Dublin, CA urban area had a 2020 population of 240,381, making it the 167th largest in the United States.

== History ==
=== Indigenous peoples ===
The valley and upland areas where contemporary Livermore is located were home to Chochenyo-speaking peoples. As a group, these people are considered Ohlone Costanoan, with distinct cultural affiliations from the neighboring Bay Miwok to the north and Valley Yokuts to the east. Four tribelets—the Yulien, Ssaoam, Ssouyn, and Pelnen—occupied the valley floor, with territory extending into the surrounding hills. Semi-permanent villages stood near water drainages on the valley floor within the current urban limits of Livermore, with seasonal camps in the surrounding uplands.

After the founding of Mission San José in 1797, the four Livermore Valley tribelets were heavily affected by Spanish recruitment: during the first seven years of the 1800s, 502 individuals from these groups were baptized at the mission. Measles outbreaks in 1806 contributed to further population decline and pushed recruiting beyond the valley into the Altamont range.

Native groups left Mission San José after secularization in the 1830s and reestablished communities in the East Bay, including in the Livermore Valley. They worked as laborers rather than rely on now-depleted traditional food sources. But as the population grew thanks to the 1848 Gold Rush and influxes of railroad workers, work became difficult to find. By 1906, only 28 Indigenous residents remained in the Livermore Valley, and most were gone by 1914.

=== 1700s ===
A Spanish expedition led by Pedro Fages skirted the western edge of Livermore Valley in 1772. Mission San José was founded in 1797 in what is now Fremont. The friars at Mission San José treated the people and land to the east as under mission control, and the area became known to them as the Valley of San José. Neighboring tribes also used the valley as a staging area for raids on the mission in this period.

=== 1800s ===
From 1800 to about 1837, the Livermore-Amador Valley was used as grazing land for Mission San José cattle, sheep, and horses. After the secularization of the mission system in the 1830s, two Mexican land grants encompassed the valley: Rancho Las Positas and Rancho Valle de San José.

==== Rancho Las Positas ====
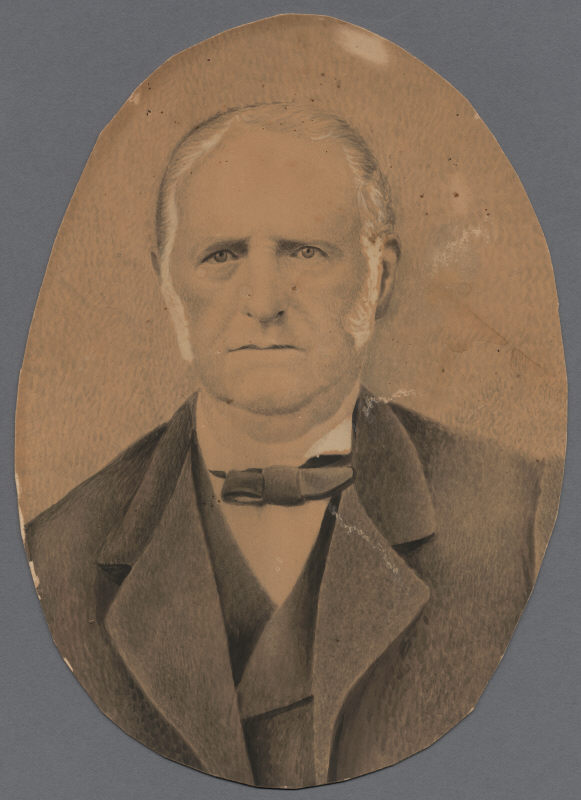
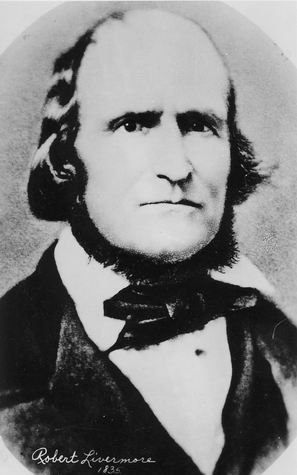
Livermore grew out of Rancho Las Positas, granted in 1839 to José Noriega and Robert Livermore.

Robert Livermore (1799–1858), the city's namesake, was a British merchant sailor who came ashore at Monterey and later settled in California. In 1839, the 48,000-acre (19,000 ha) Rancho Las Positas grant, which included much of present-day Livermore, was made to Livermore and Jose Noriega. In the early 1840s, Livermore moved his family from the Sunol Valley to Rancho Las Positas, becoming the second non-Indigenous family to settle in the Livermore Valley.

After the United States took control of California and the California Gold Rush began in 1848, Livermore sold cattle to miners traveling between the Bay Area and the gold fields. His ranch became a stopping point for travelers heading toward Sacramento and the Mother Lode by way of Altamont Pass; the area consequently became known as Livermore's Valley.

==== Founding ====
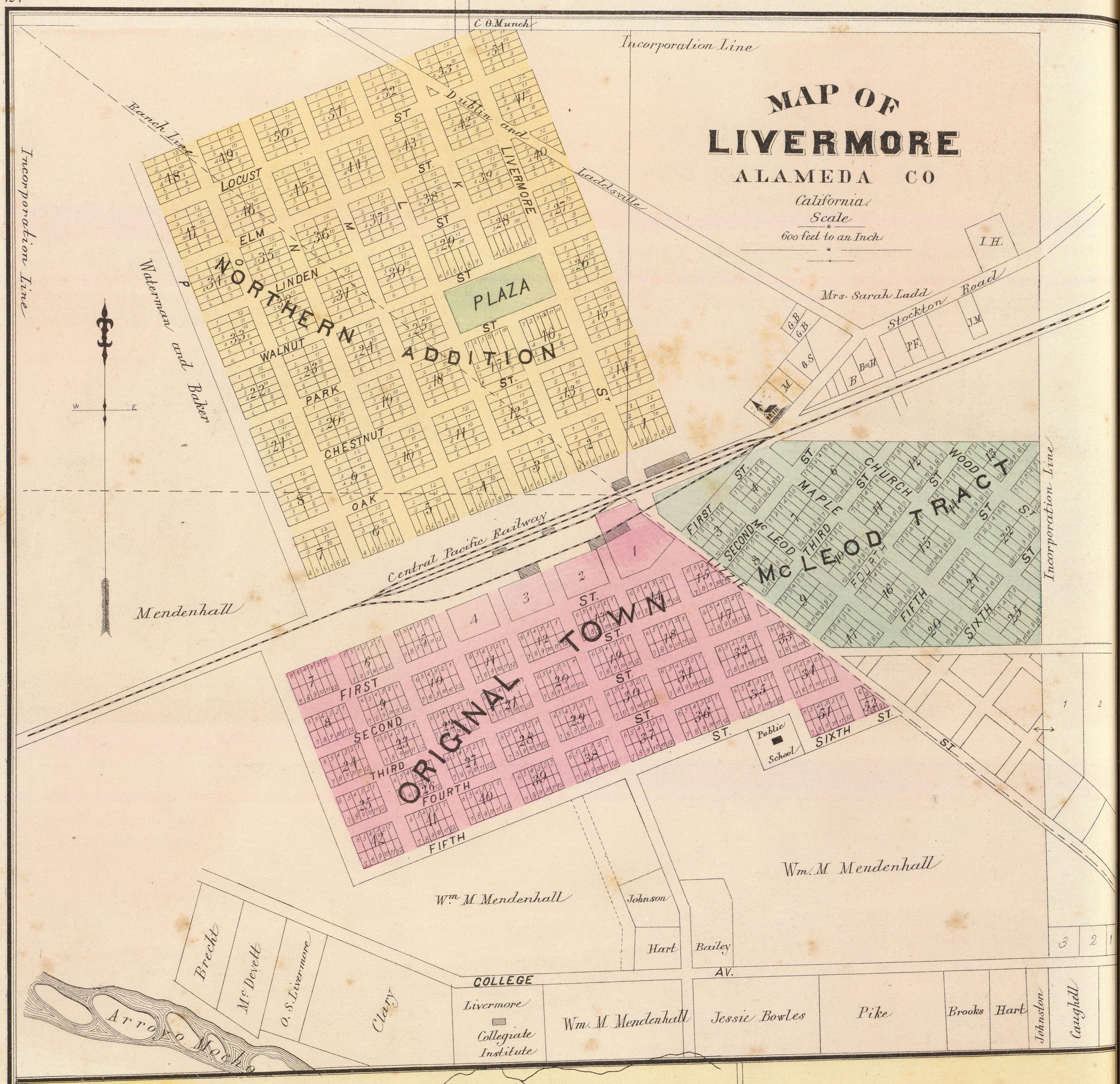
A map of Livermore published in 1878 by Thompson & West

Robert Livermore died in 1858. The first settlement in the valley was Laddsville, which developed around a hotel established by Alponso Ladd in the 1860s.

The city's founder, William Mendenhall, owned land in the Livermore Valley and in 1869 set aside 100 acres (40 ha) for a townsite. He named the town Livermore after his friend Robert Livermore. Livermore was platted and registered on November 4, 1869, as a railroad town. The Western Pacific Railroad built tracks on land previously signed over by Robert Livermore, and placed a station on land donated by Mendenhall.

The new railroad connection significantly accelerated Livermore's growth. Impetus was also added when Laddsville merged into Livermore after a fire in 1871. The city was incorporated on April 1, 1876.

==== Early Livermore ====
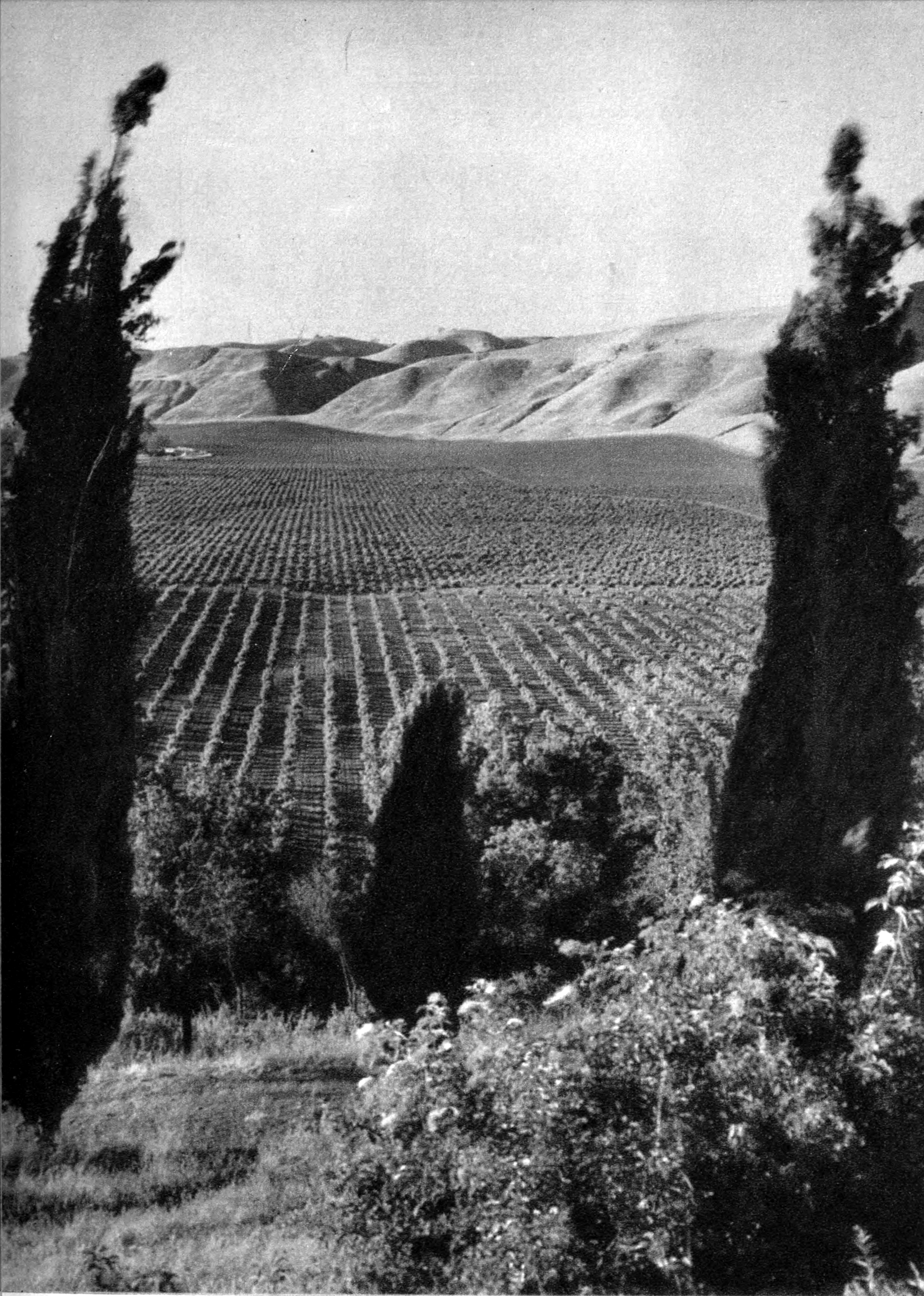
A vineyard in the Livermore Valley, photographed in 1939

In its early decades, Livermore's economy was based on wheat, cattle, coal, oil, roses, and wine. Wineries founded in the 1880s, including Wente Vineyards, Concannon Vineyards, and Cresta Blanca Winery, shaped the valley's wine industry. Coal was mined in the nearby Corral Hollow area, which between 1895 and 1905 was among California's larger coal-producing districts. Smaller contributions to the town's economy include extensive chromite deposits found nearby, and magnesite deposits on Red Mountain.

By the 1870s, Livermore had a fire company, churches, a bank, a library, and schools. Electric lights were introduced by 1888, and by 1890 the town had more than 20 miles (32 km) of streets. Petroleum and natural-gas seeps have been documented in the Livermore Valley, and oil and gas exploration occurred in and around the city during the late 19th and early 20th centuries.

=== 1900s ===
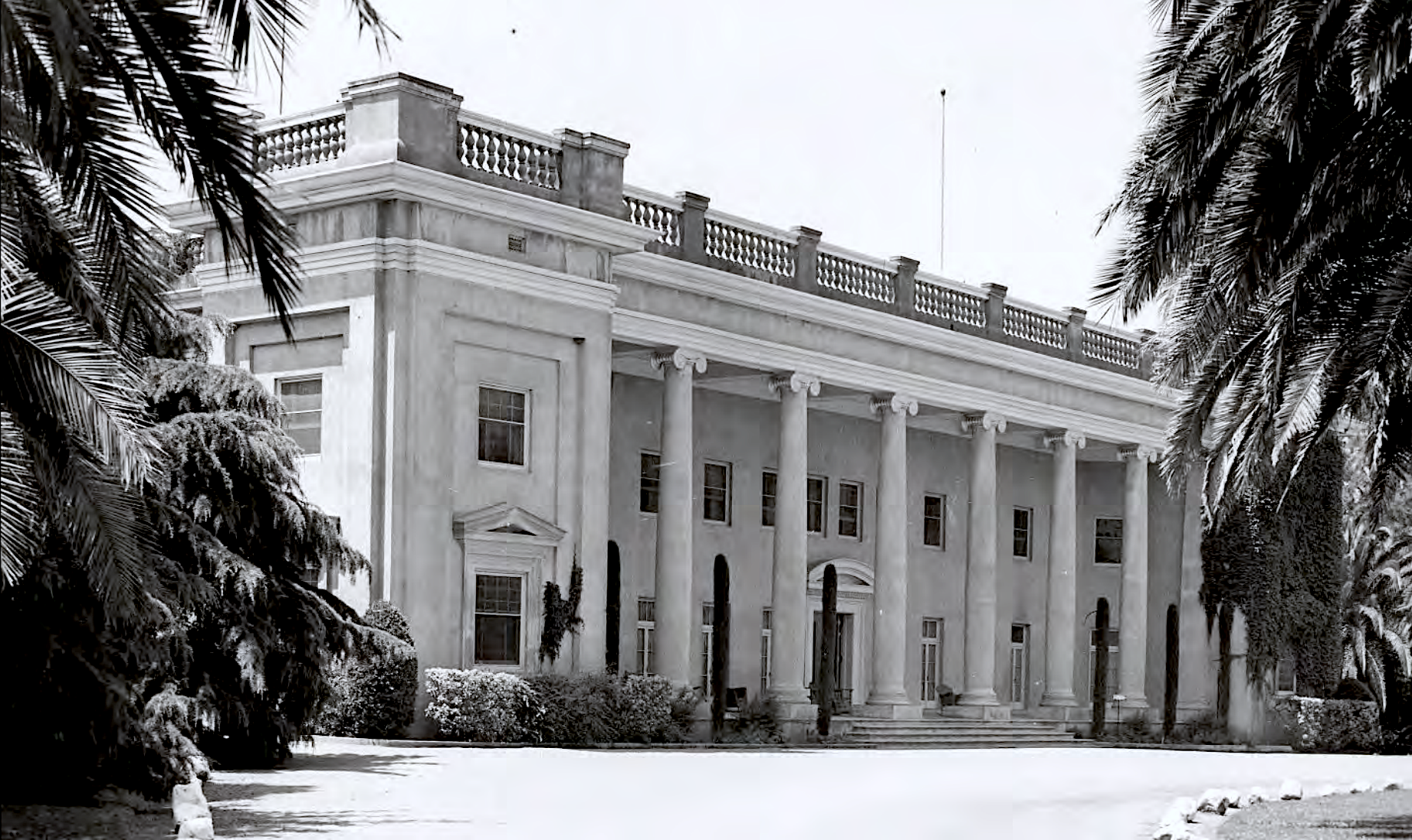
The Livermore Sanitarium in 1904

In the late 19th and early 20th centuries, the Livermore Valley attracted sanitariums on account of its climate and air. The Livermore Sanitarium operated from 1894 to 1960 for the treatment of alcoholism and mental disorders, and the Arroyo del Valle Sanitarium operated from 1918 to about 1960 for the treatment of tuberculosis. In 1909, the Livermore Carnegie Library and Park opened with support from a Carnegie library grant.

The city remained agricultural until the mid-20th century. In 1942, the U.S. government acquired 692 acres (280 ha) of ranch land and built Livermore Naval Air Station to train Navy pilots during World War II. The facility closed after the war and was later transferred for use by the University of California's Radiation Laboratory, which became Lawrence Livermore National Laboratory (LLNL). The growth of Livermore after World War II was shaped by the establishment of LLNL in 1952 and the Sandia National Laboratories California site in 1956, along with suburban expansion from the wider Bay Area. LLNL caused the city to grow into a technological center, while suburban expansion increased the population. Specifically, the city's population approximately tripled between 1970 and 2000 as Bay Area residents moved eastward.

=== 2000s ===
In the early 2000s, much work was done by the city and a highway was redirected to make the downtown walkable, which previously was a place to pass through more than visit even for residents of the town.

== Geography ==
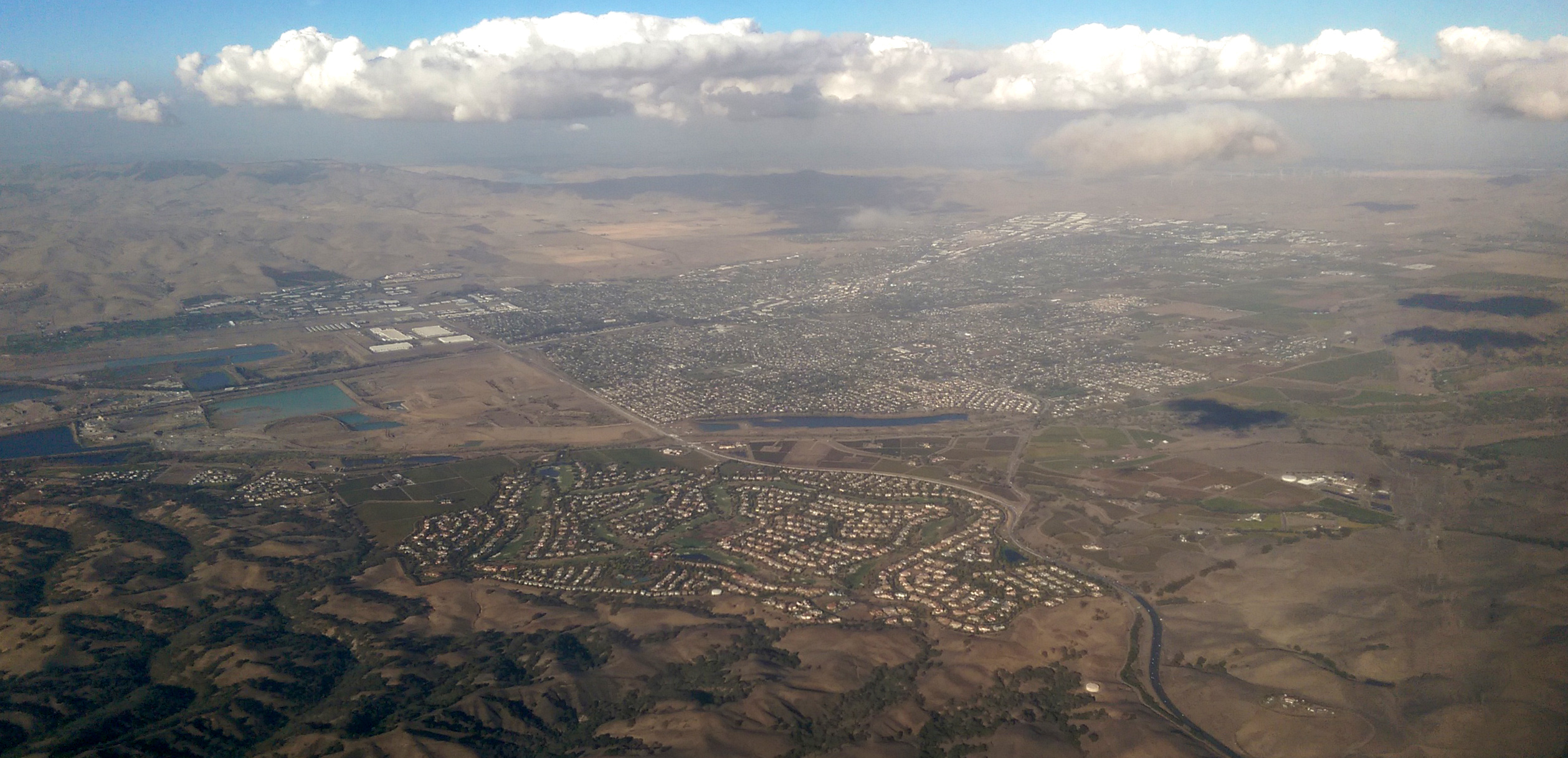
Livermore from the southwest

The Livermore Valley lies within the Diablo Range, part of the California Coast Ranges around the San Francisco Bay Area. It is ~15 mi long east-west and 10 mi north-south. The valley has an east–west orientation, with passes connecting the Bay Area to the Central Valley. These passes are used by highways and rail lines.

Watercourses draining Livermore include Arroyo Mocho, Arroyo Valle, Arroyo Seco, and Arroyo Las Positas. The principal aquifer underlying the city is the Mocho Subbasin. According to the United States Census Bureau, the city has a total area of 26.45 square miles (68.5 km^{2}), nearly all of it land. Several local seismic zones lie near the city, including the Greenville Fault, Tesla Fault, and Livermore Fault.

The soil in the valley is classified as very gravelly coarse sandy loam. It was formed from very gravelly alluvium made of sedimentary and metasedimentary rock.

=== Climate ===
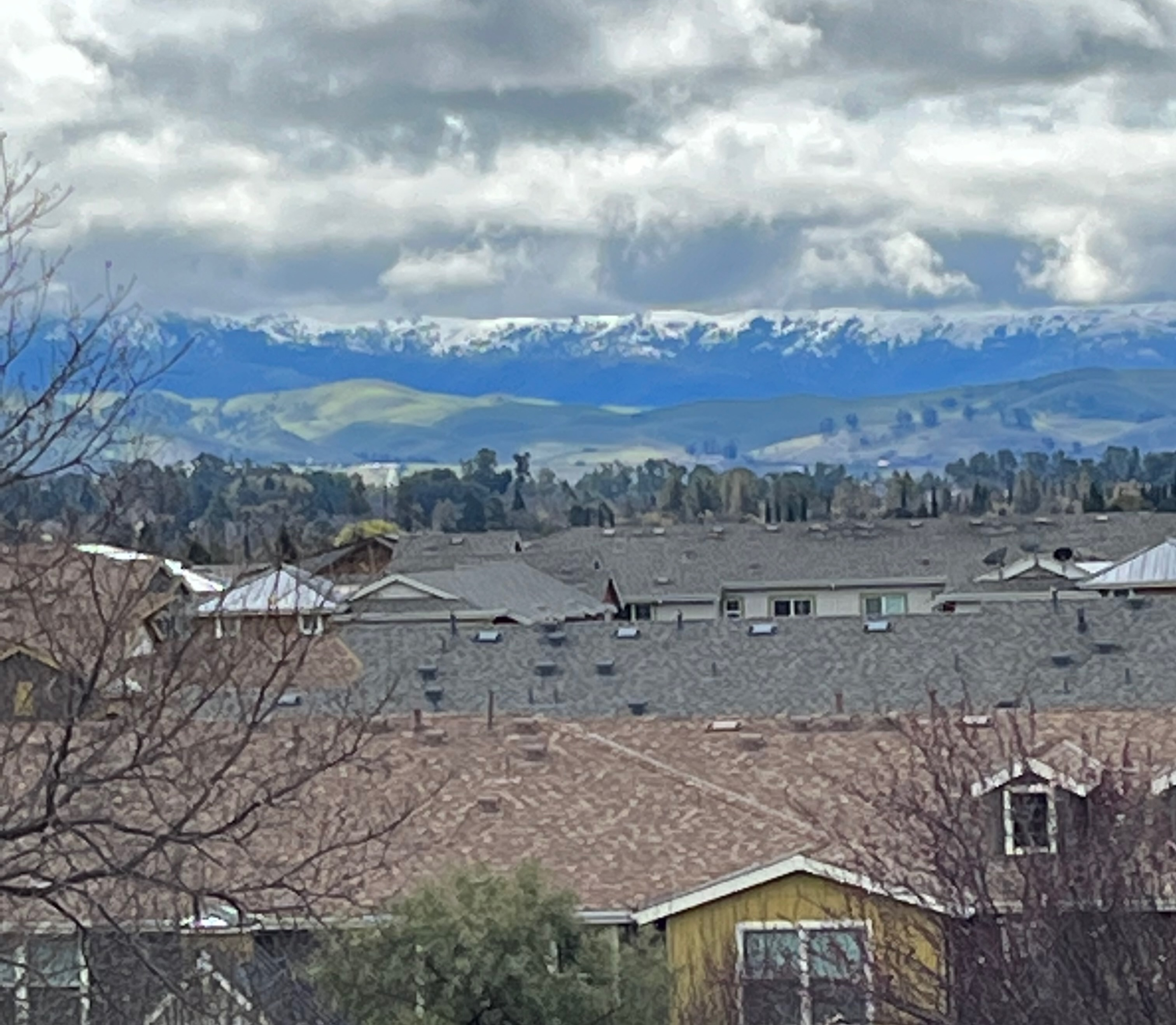
Snow near Livermore in 2023

Livermore has a hot-summer Mediterranean climate (Csa), with hot, dry summers and cool winters with occasional rain. The climate is strongly influenced by winds from the Pacific, lowering temperatures compared to the hotter parts of the Central Valley immediately eastward. Complication is introduced by the fact that Pacific winds enter the valley from multiple locations. Snow is rare but has occurred on surrounding hills and occasionally in the valley.

Climate data for Livermore, California (1991–2020 normals, extremes 1903–present)
Month	Jan	Feb	Mar	Apr	May	Jun	Jul	Aug	Sep	Oct	Nov	Dec	Year
Record high °F (°C)	81 (27)	82 (28)	90 (32)	97 (36)	108 (42)	113 (45)	113 (45)	112 (44)	116 (47)	110 (43)	92 (33)	79 (26)	116 (47)
Mean daily maximum °F (°C)	56.8 (13.8)	61.0 (16.1)	65.8 (18.8)	70.6 (21.4)	76.6 (24.8)	83.9 (28.8)	89.0 (31.7)	88.6 (31.4)	85.9 (29.9)	77.2 (25.1)	64.9 (18.3)	56.9 (13.8)	73.1 (22.8)
Mean daily minimum °F (°C)	39.0 (3.9)	41.0 (5.0)	43.3 (6.3)	45.7 (7.6)	50.0 (10.0)	53.8 (12.1)	56.6 (13.7)	56.6 (13.7)	54.7 (12.6)	49.7 (9.8)	42.8 (6.0)	38.8 (3.8)	47.7 (8.7)
Average precipitation inches (mm)	2.78 (71)	2.72 (69)	2.20 (56)	1.10 (28)	0.51 (13)	0.12 (3.0)	0.00 (0.00)	0.04 (1.0)	0.09 (2.3)	0.77 (20)	1.54 (39)	2.73 (69)	14.60 (371)
Source 1: NOAA
Source 2: National Weather Service

== Demographics ==
Historical population
Census	Pop.	Note	%±
1880	855		—
1890	1,391		62.7%
1900	1,493		7.3%
1910	2,030		36.0%
1920	1,916		−5.6%
1930	3,119		62.8%
1940	2,885		−7.5%
1950	4,364		51.3%
1960	16,058		268.0%
1970	37,703		134.8%
1980	48,349		28.2%
1990	56,741		17.4%
2000	73,345		29.3%
2010	80,968		10.4%
2020	87,955		8.6%
U.S. Decennial Census

=== Racial and ethnic composition ===
Livermore, California – Racial and ethnic composition
Race / Ethnicity	Pop. 2000	Pop. 2010	Pop. 2020	% 2000	% 2010	% 2020
White alone, not Hispanic or Latino	54,587	52,397	48,449	74.42%	64.71%	55.08%
Black or African American alone, not Hispanic or Latino	1,094	1,562	1,604	1.49%	1.93%	1.82%
Native American or Alaska Native alone, not Hispanic or Latino	315	251	203	0.43%	0.31%	0.23%
Asian alone, not Hispanic or Latino	4,171	6,643	12,633	5.69%	8.20%	14.36%
Native Hawaiian or Pacific Islander alone, not Hispanic or Latino	189	231	209	0.26%	0.29%	0.24%
Other race alone, not Hispanic or Latino	185	202	500	0.25%	0.25%	0.57%
Mixed race or multiracial, not Hispanic or Latino	2,263	2,762	5,379	3.09%	3.41%	6.12%
Hispanic or Latino of any race	10,541	16,920	18,978	14.37%	20.90%	21.58%
Total	73,345	80,968	87,955	100.00%	100.00%	100.00%

=== 2020 census ===
At the 2020 United States census, Livermore had a population of 87,955 and a population density of approximately 3,326 people per square mile. The median age was 39.9 years. About 70.7% of occupied housing units were owner-occupied and 29.3% were renter-occupied.

=== 2010 census ===
The 2010 United States census reported that Livermore had a population of 80,968. The population density was 3,216.1 people per square mile. The homeowner vacancy rate was 1.5%, and the rental vacancy rate was 4.8%.

=== Income ===
In 2023, the U.S. Census Bureau estimated Livermore's median household income at $153,602 and per capita income at $71,179. About 2.4% of families and 4.4% of the population were below the poverty line.

=== Voter registration ===
As of October 2019, there were 53,792 registered voters in Livermore; 21,158 were Democrats, 15,061 were Republicans, and 14,499 were independents or decline-to-state voters.

== Economy ==
=== Laboratories ===
The Livermore area contains two U.S. Department of Energy national laboratories. Lawrence Livermore National Laboratory is the city's largest employer (17% as of 2025) and conducts national-security, energy, scientific, and technology research. The laboratory's stated responsibilities include ensuring the safety, security, and reliability of the United States nuclear deterrent; its researchers co-discovered livermorium.

The California site of Sandia National Laboratories is also in Livermore. It is the city's second largest employer (~4% as of 2025). Sandia describes its mission as focused on national security. The California campus is managed and operated by National Technology & Engineering Solutions of Sandia, a wholly owned subsidiary of Honeywell International.

=== i-GATE ===
In 2010, the national laboratories, the city of Livermore, and regional partners established i-GATE, an innovation hub and business incubator focused on energy and transportation technologies. The campus has shared facilities with Robot Garden, a community workshop and hackerspace.

=== Wine ===
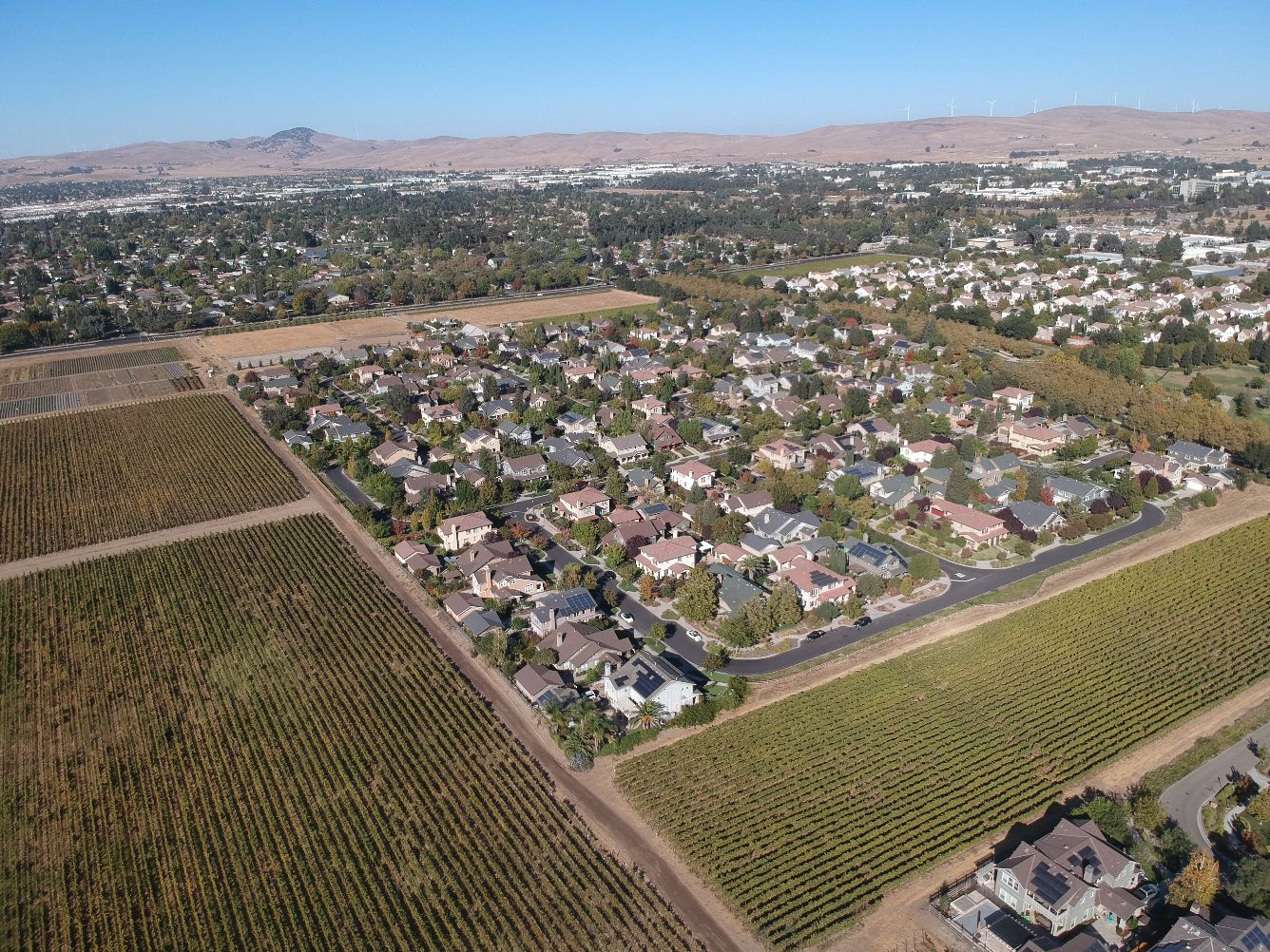
Southeast Livermore neighborhood surrounded by vineyards

The Livermore Valley American Viticultural Area dates commercial viticulture to the 1840s, when Robert Livermore planted the first vines in the valley. In the 1880s, C. H. Wente, James Concannon, and Charles Wetmore founded wineries in the Livermore Valley.

=== Top employers ===
According to the city's 2024-25 Annual Comprehensive Financial Report, the top employers in Livermore were:

#	Employer	Employees	Percentage
1	Lawrence Livermore National Laboratory	9,749	16.91%
2	Sandia National Laboratories	2,067	3.59%
3	Livermore Valley Joint Unified School District	1,401	2.43%
4	GILLIG	1,198	2.08%
5	FormFactor	920	1.60%
6	Kaiser Permanente	825	1.43%
7	City of Livermore	535	0.93%
8	LAM Research	474	0.82%
9	Topcon Positioning	410	0.71%
10	US Foods	360	0.62%

Gillig, a bus manufacturer, moved its factory to Livermore in 2017.

== Arts and culture ==
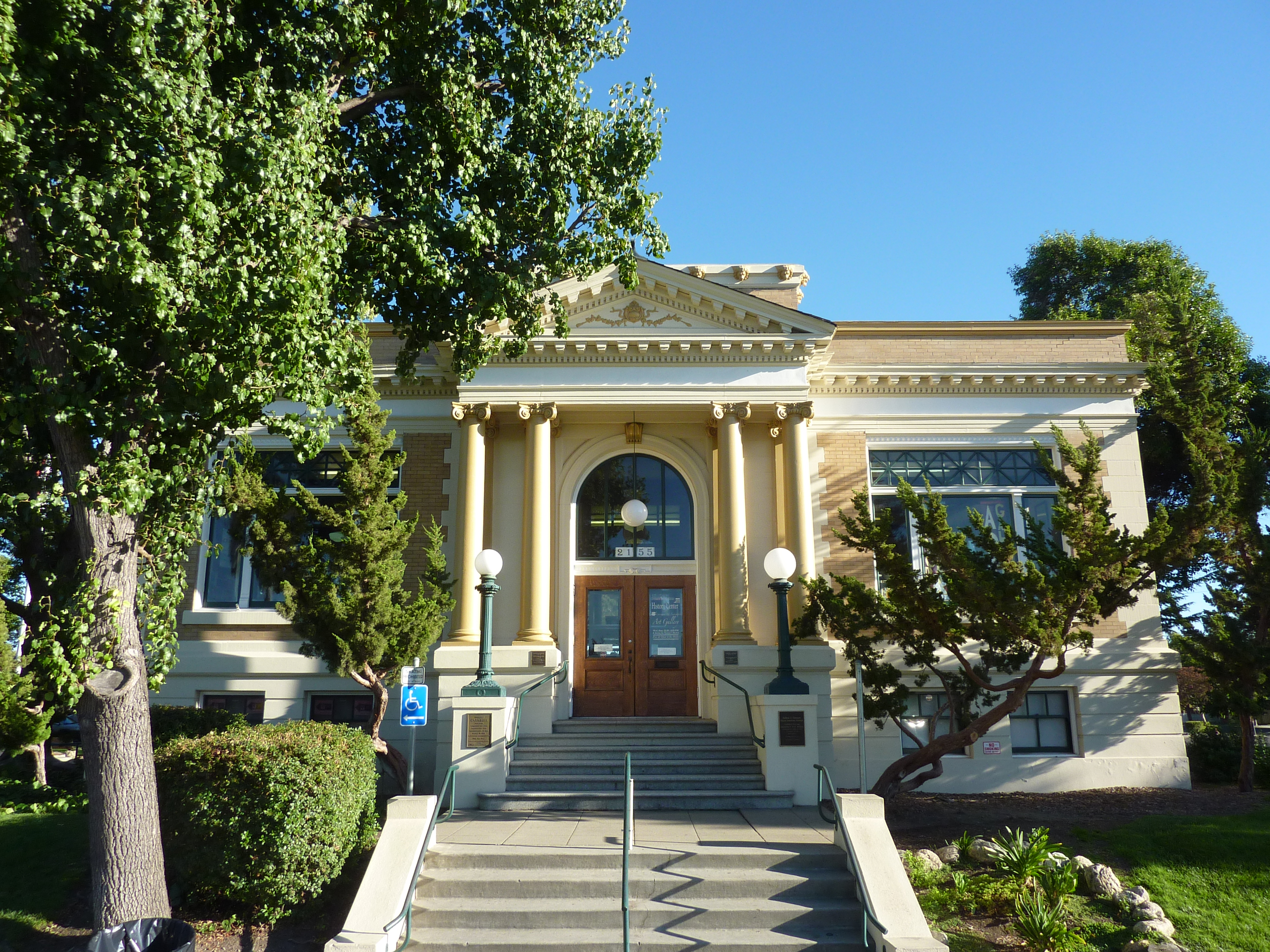
Livermore Carnegie Library and Park is one of five Livermore landmarks listed on the National Register of Historic Places.

First Presbyterian Church of Livermore's chapel

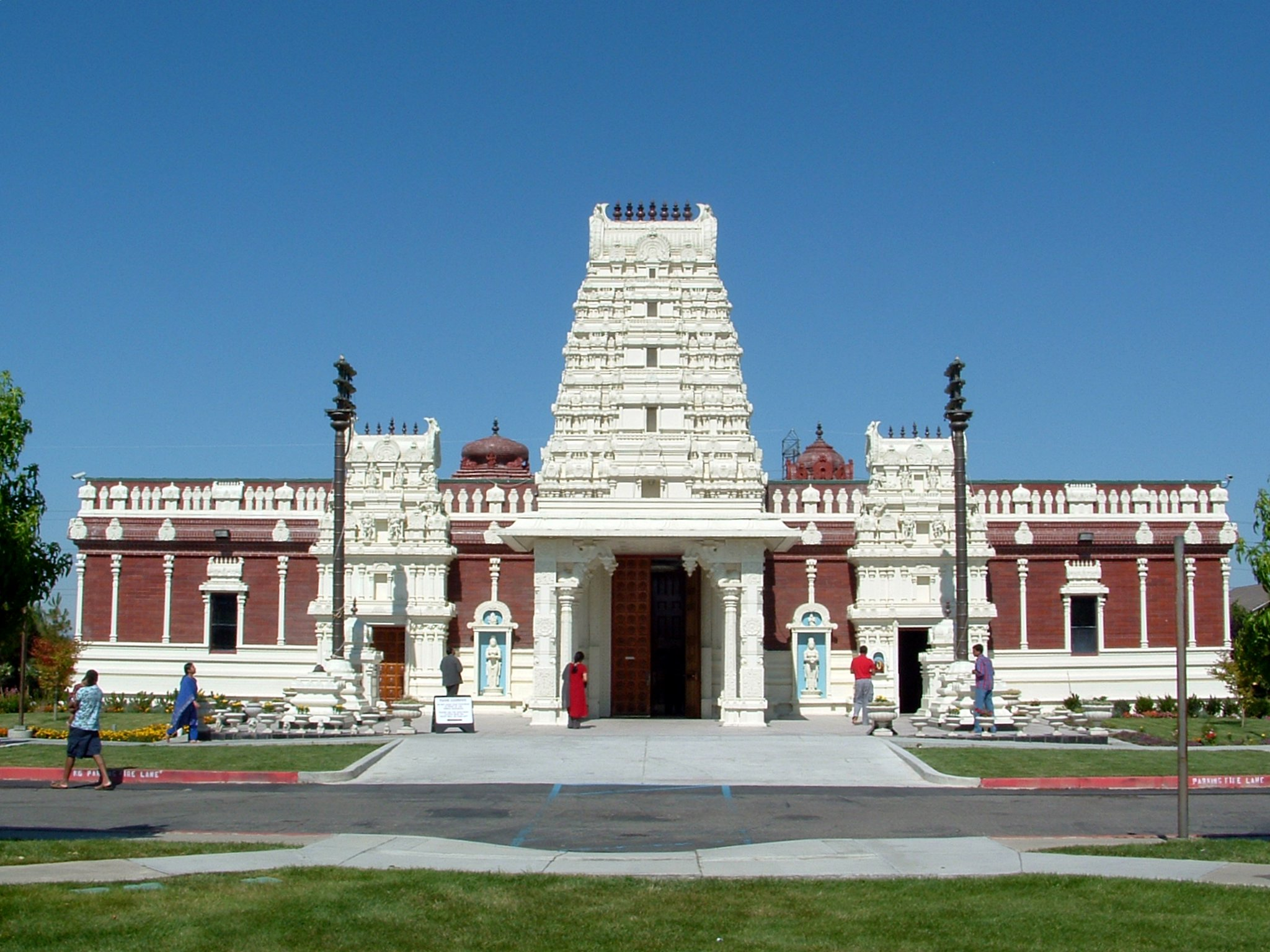
Shiva-Vishnu Temple, a Hindu temple in Livermore.

Livermore hosts the annual Livermore Rodeo, which began in 1918 as a fundraiser for the Red Cross during World War I. The city lies within the Livermore Valley wine region, discussed in the Economy section.

The Centennial Light, a light bulb first installed at a fire department hose cart house on L Street in 1901, is housed at Livermore-Pleasanton Fire Department Station 6 and has burned almost continuously since installation.

Livermore has a seasonal local farmers market on Thursdays.

The official city flower is the Livermore tarplant, an endangered plant that only grows near Livermore.

=== Media ===
Radio station KKIQ is licensed in Livermore and broadcasts in the Tri-Valley area. The Independent is a local newspaper founded in September 1963. It is located in the Bank of Italy building.

== Parks and recreation ==
The Livermore Area Recreation and Park District (LARPD) is an independent special district created by voters in 1947. It is governed by a five-member elected board of directors, each serving a four-year term. LARPD operates neighborhood parks, community parks, open-space parks, special-use parks, recreation programs, aquatics, environmental education, senior services, and special events.

Shadow Cliffs Regional Recreation Area, near Livermore and Pleasanton, was formerly a gravel quarry donated to the East Bay Regional Park District by Kaiser Industries and opened as a park in 1971. The park covers 266 acres (108 ha) and includes an 80-acre (32 ha) lake.

== Government ==
Livermore has a council–manager form of government. The City Council provides policy direction and appoints a city manager, who oversees city operations.

The City Council consists of a mayor elected at large and four council members elected by district. As of 2026, the mayor is John Marchand. The four council members, each representing a district, are Evan Branning (District 1), Ben Barrientos (District 2), Steven Dunbar (District 3), and Kristie Wang (District 4); Wang also serves as vice mayor. Marianna A. Burch is the city manager.

In the California State Legislature, Livermore is represented by Jerry McNerney in the 5th Senate District and Rebecca Bauer-Kahan in the 16th Assembly District. In the United States House of Representatives, Livermore is in California's 14th congressional district; the seat is vacant following the resignation of Eric Swalwell in April 2026.

Livermore vote by party in presidential elections
Year	Democratic	Republican
2024	60.8% 26,804	36.0% 15,897
2020	62.4% 30,344	35.2% 17,130
2016	57.1% 22,476	35.1% 13,837
2012	54.9% 20,088	42.5% 15,562
2008	57.3% 21,571	40.9% 15,400
2004	49.9% 17,045	49.0% 16,728
2000	47.9% 14,066	48.1% 14,110
1996	45.2% 11,871	43.4% 11,409
1992	39.0% 10,906	35.3% 9,853
1988	39.6% 8,980	58.9% 13,365
1984	30.5% 6,789	68.1% 15,185
1980	28.9% 5,291	56.8% 10,397
1976	44.0% 7,612	54.1% 9,364
1972	34.8% 6,314	62.1% 11,256
1968	39.7% 5,103	52.5% 6,754
1964	55.2% 5,474	44.8% 4,436

=== General Plan ===
Livermore's General Plan guides city decisions on land use, mobility, housing, open space, economic development, community identity, and related services. The city began updating its 2004 General Plan in 2021, and a public-review draft of the General Plan 2045 was available in 2026 through the Imagine Livermore 2045 process.

== Education ==
Public schools in Livermore are operated by the Livermore Valley Joint Unified School District. The district includes elementary, middle, comprehensive high, and alternative high schools.

=== Charter schools shutdown ===
Two charter schools in Livermore, Livermore Valley Charter School and Livermore Valley Charter Preparatory, were operated by the Tri-Valley Learning Corporation. Both schools closed by the start of the 2018 school year amid allegations of financial mismanagement and problems involving exchange students. Displaced students were absorbed by other local schools and programs.

== Media ==
KKIQ is a radio station licensed to Livermore. The Independent, founded in 1963, is a local newspaper serving Dublin, Livermore, Pleasanton, and Sunol.

== Infrastructure ==
=== Transportation ===
Interstate 580 is Livermore's primary east–west freeway. It runs along the northern edge of the city before heading east through Altamont Pass toward the Central Valley and Interstate 5. Interstate 680 lies west of Livermore. State Route 84 heads southwest from I-580 toward Fremont, and Vasco Road connects Livermore to Brentwood and the Sacramento–San Joaquin River Delta.

Livermore Municipal Airport is located northwest of the city and serves private, business, and corporate aviation. The WHEELS bus system operates in Livermore, Pleasanton, Dublin, and surrounding unincorporated areas of Alameda County, with connections to Bay Area Rapid Transit (BART) stations in Dublin and Pleasanton.

Livermore has two Altamont Corridor Express stations, at Vasco Road and at downtown Livermore. In 2018, the BART board voted against extending BART to Livermore. The Tri-Valley–San Joaquin Valley Regional Rail Authority was formed to establish a rail connection between the existing BART system and the Altamont Corridor Express; the proposed service is known as Valley Link.

=== Police ===
The Livermore Police Department provides law-enforcement services for the city.

=== Fire department ===
The Livermore-Pleasanton Fire Department provides fire and advanced life-support services to Livermore and Pleasanton.

== Notable people ==
=== Arts ===
- Kyle Allen, actor
- Conrad Bain (1923–2013), actor in Diff'rent Strokes
- Sonny Barger, outlaw biker and actor
- Bryn Davies, musician
- Tara Kemp, pop and soul singer
- Matt Finders, musician
- Judith Merkle Riley, author
- Bill Owens, photographer
- Ashley Padilla, comedian and actress
- Connie Post, first poet laureate of Livermore
- James Wesley Rawles, survivalist author
- Vanessa Ray, actress
- Brandon Rogers, comedian, actor, and YouTuber
- Brock Van Wey, electronic musician
- Jill Whelan, actress

=== Politics ===
- Bob Beers, Nevada state senator
- Harold Brown, former director of Lawrence Livermore National Laboratory and U.S. Secretary of Defense
- Robert Livermore, town namesake
- Hans Mark, physicist and former U.S. Secretary of the Air Force
- Jean Quan, former mayor of Oakland

=== Science ===
- Ralph Merkle, pioneer in modern cryptography
- George H. Miller, former director of Lawrence Livermore National Laboratory
- Edward Teller, physicist and former director of Lawrence Livermore National Laboratory
- Herb York, first director of Lawrence Livermore National Laboratory

=== Sports ===
- Kristin Allen, World Games gold medalist gymnast
- Max Baer, heavyweight champion boxer
- Mark Davis, Major League Baseball pitcher
- Troy Dayak, Major League Soccer player
- Duane Glinton, soccer player
- J. R. Graham, Major League Baseball pitcher
- Brian Johnson, Major League Soccer player
- Randy Johnson, Major League Baseball pitcher and Baseball Hall of Fame inductee
- Bill Mooneyham, Major League Baseball pitcher
- Michael Rodrigues, World Games gold medalist gymnast
- Bryan Shaw, Major League Baseball pitcher

=== Business ===
- Margaret F. Slusher (1879–1971), businesswoman

== Sister cities ==
Livermore has three sister cities, as designated by Sister Cities International:

- Quetzaltenango, Guatemala
- Snezhinsk, Russia
- Yotsukaidō, Japan

== See also ==
- National Register of Historic Places listings in Alameda County, California
- Arroyo del Valle Sanitarium
