= Tulare Lake (Alameda County) =

Former lake in northern California

- Willow Marsh; The Lagoon
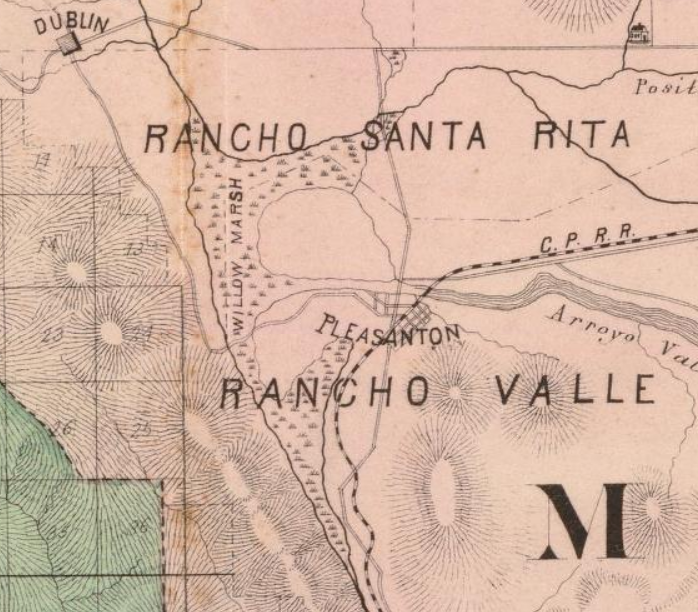
- The extent of the marshland ("Willow Marsh") surrounding Tulare Lake in 1878

- Location within California
- Location: Amador Valley; Alameda County, California
- Coordinates: 37°40′N 121°54′W
- Type: Marsh (drained)
- Etymology: Once characterized by tule rush
- Primary inflows: Arroyo Mocho; Arroyo Valle; Arroyo Las Positas; Tassajara Creek; South San Ramon Creek
- Primary outflows: Alameda Creek, via Arroyo de la Laguna
- Catchment area: San Francisco Bay
- Basin countries: United States
- Settlements: Pleasanton, California; Dublin, California; Pelnen (Ohlone); Seunen (Ohlone)

Tulare Lake was a large, shallow lake in the center of the Amador Valley, surrounded by Willow Marsh (also known as the Lagoon). Tule rushes and willow trees once lined the marshes and sloughs of its shores. Drainage alterations starting in the 19th century have since reduced the marsh to the Arroyo de la Laguna, and the city of Pleasanton has since expanded across what was once marshland. Such rapid developments have led to large seasonal flow variations in Niles Canyon.

The lake was fed by the runoff of the entire Amador Valley, as well as the Arroyo Mocho and the Arroyo Valle. Its outlet was the Arroyo de la Laguna, which flowed for a short distance before joining Alameda Creek.

The Tulare Lake area (Amador Valley and Livermore Valley) was inhabited by groups of the Ohlone people prior to the 19th century, in particular the Pelnen tribe near Pleasanton.
