= San Antonio Creek (Santa Clara County) =

Location
- Country: United States
- State: California
- Region: Santa Clara County
- City: San Antonio Valley, California

Physical characteristics
- Source: Southwest slopes of Mount Stakes in the Diablo Range
  - coordinates: 37°18′36″N 121°24′54″W
  - elevation: 3,177 ft (968 m)
- Mouth: Confluence with Arroyo Bayo to form source of Arroyo Valle
  - coordinates: 37°23′08″N 121°34′21″W
  - elevation: 1,808 ft (551 m)

Basin features
- Tributaries
  - left: Jumpoff Creek
  - right: Beauregard Creek, Long Gulch

San Antonio Creek is a 24.4-kilometre-long (15.2 mi) northwesterly-flowing stream originating on the eastern edge of Santa Clara County just west of its border with Stanislaus County.

== History ==
On April 5, 1776, the de Anza Expedition called the area El Cañada de San Vicente as he traversed the west side of San Antonio Valley from north to south. The 1956 Thomas Brothers map spells it San Antone. This spelling mimics the way it is pronounced in common, modern usage by locals. It was spelled San Antone on the 1924 "Mount Boardman, California" U.S. Geological Survey 15-minute quadrangle.

== Watershed and course ==
San Antonio Creek arises at 3,177 feet (968 m) on the southwest slopes of Mount Stakes and descends into the San Antonio Valley. San Antonio Creek's tributaries are, in order heading downstream, Beauregard Creek on the right, Jumpoff Creek on the left, and Long Gulch on the right. Its confluence with Arroyo Bayo forms the source of Arroyo Valle. Arroyo Valle proceeds through Lake Del Valle to join Arroyo de la Laguna thence to Alameda Creek and finally terminates in San Francisco Bay. San Antonio Creek and Beauregard Creek are ephemeral.

== Habitat and wildlife ==
The area includes the San Antonio Valley Ecological Reserve, a 3,282-acre nature preserve created by a Nature Conservancy purchase of land from local rancher, Keith Hurner, and known for its herd of tule elk (Cervus canadensis nannodes).

There is not historical evidence of San Antonio Creek, Beauregard Creek or Arroyo Bayo supporting steelhead trout (Oncorhynchus mykiss), although Arroyo Valle was a historical steelhead stream whose "headwaters were full of fish".

== See also ==
- San Antonio Valley, California
- List of watercourses in the San Francisco Bay Area
