= Arroyo Bayo =

Arroyo Bayo Arroyo Bayou
- Location of the mouth in California

Location
- Country: United States
- State: California
- Region: Santa Clara County

Physical characteristics
- Source: Just west of upper San Antonio Valley in the Diablo Range
  - coordinates: 37°20′06″N 121°29′20″W
  - elevation: 2,420 ft (740 m)
- Mouth: Confluence with San Antonio Creek to form Arroyo Valle
  - coordinates: 37°23′08″N 121°34′21″W
  - elevation: 1,808 ft (551 m)

Basin features
- Tributaries
  - left: Jack Canyon Creek, Blumbago Canyon Creek
  - right: Bollinger Canyon Creek, Sawtooth Canyon Creek

Arroyo Bayo is an 8-mile-long (13 km) perennial stream which flows northwest along San Antonio Valley Road (SR 130) east of Mt. Hamilton in the Diablo Range. It is part of the southern Alameda Creek watershed in Santa Clara County, California.

== History ==
The historic Rancho Arroyo Bayo was located where Blumbago Canyon Creek joins Arroyo Bayo. The section of Mt. Hamilton Road east of Mt. Hamilton was known as Bayou Road on the historic Thomas and West map. "Bayo" is Mexican Spanish for a dun, brown, or sorrel horse with a dark mane, tail and stripe on its back.

== Watershed and course ==
Arroyo Bayo arises at 2,240 feet (680 m) then flows west-northwest along Mount Hamilton Road then turns north where it is joined by San Antonio Creek to form Arroyo Valle. Arroyo Valle flows north through Lake Del Valle to the Livermore Valley where it turns west to Arroyo de la Laguna at Interstate 680, ultimately joining Alameda Creek and terminating in San Francisco Bay.

== Habitat and Ecology ==
Informal surveys of Arroyo Bayo have found no steelhead trout (Oncorhynchus mykiss).

== See also ==
- Mount Hamilton (California)
- List of watercourses in the San Francisco Bay Area
