= Pleasanton Fault =

The Pleasanton Fault is a seismically active geological structure in Alameda County and Contra Costa County, California, US. The existence of the fault is disputed as geotechnical reports have found no evidence for its existence.

== Relation to hydrological features ==
All the streams draining Livermore Valley merge above the Bernal Subbasin and then leave the subbasin and the valley as the Arroyo de la Laguna. Groundwater occurs throughout the valley floor portion of the Bernal Subbasin under conditions ranging from unconfined to confined. There is no inflow of groundwater across the Pleasanton Fault south of the City of Pleasanton. This consequence arises because any movement of groundwater in the southern section is essentially parallel to the Pleasanton Fault.

== See also ==
- Mocho Subbasin
- Tesla Fault
