= Tassajara =

Tassajara may refer to:

- Tassajara, California, in Contra Costa County
- Tassajara Formation
- Tassajara Hot Springs
- Tassajara Zen Mountain Center
- Tassajara - mountain bike design by Gary Fisher
- Tassajara Cellars - winery in Paso Robles, California
- Tassajara Creek (Arroyo Seco River) - tributary of the Arroyo Seco River (Monterey County), in the Ventana Wilderness
- Tassajara Creek - creek in the Morgan Territory Regional Preserve in Alameda County, California
- Tassajara Mountain or Mount Tassajara - peak in the Santa Lucia Mountains
