= Bernal Subbasin =

Aquifer

Coordinates: 37°39′59.15″N 121°53′53.22″W

The Bernal Subbasin is an aquifer located in the southwestern corner of Livermore Valley Groundwater Basin, Alameda County, California, United States. All of the groundwater in Livermore Valley moves toward the Bernal Subbasin, which is bounded on the east by Pleasanton Fault, on the north by the Park Fault, and on the west by the Calaveras Fault.(Earth Metrics, 1989) All the streams draining the Livermore Valley merge above the Bernal formation and exit this subbasin and Livermore Amador Valley via the Arroyo de la Laguna.

Groundwater occurs throughout the valley floor portion of the Bernal Subbasin under conditions ranging from unconfined to confined. There is no inflow of groundwater across the Pleasanton Fault south of the City of Pleasanton, because any movement of groundwater in the southern section is essentially parallel to the fault.(Bonnie, 2000)

Groundwater in the Bernal Subbasin typically occurs at an approximate depths of 12 to 30 feet (3.7 to 9.1 meters) below ground surface and flows from east to west.

== Notes ==
- Bonnie, Thomas L., Projected impacts of injecting reclaimed, reverse osmosis water into the Livermore-Amador Groundwater Basin (2000)
- Earth Metrics Incorporated, Phase I Environmental Site Assessment, Hopyard Village Shopping Center, Pleasanton, California , Report 7952W0.00, May 24, 1989
- Evaluation of Groundwater Resources, Livermore and Sunol Valley, 1974

== See also ==
- Arroyo Valle - westward flowing stream in Livermore and Pleasanton.
- Mocho Subbasin - groundwater subbasin in the Livermore Valley.
- Niles Cone - groundwater basin in Alameda County.
