= Bishop Subbasin =

Aquifer in the Amador Valley, California, US

The Bishop Subbasin is an aquifer that resides between two subsurface structures of the Tassajara Formation in the northern extremity of the Amador Valley, California. This aquifer is a sub-unit of the Livermore-Amador Groundwater Basin. The Bishop Subbasin is associated with the locale of San Ramon, California in Contra Costa County. The Bishop Subbasin along with the Mocho Subbasin is one of the aquifers in the Livermore Valley that has been studied the most heavily for benefits of injection of reclaimed reverse osmosis waters.

== See also ==
- South San Ramon Creek
- Arroyo de la Laguna
