= Amador Valley =

Valley in California, United States of America

Coordinates: 37°40′59″N 121°52′26″W

Amador Valley is a valley in eastern Alameda County, California and is the location of the cities of Dublin and Pleasanton. Part of Tri-Valley, the valley is bounded by the foothills of the Diablo Range on the north and south, Pleasanton Ridge to the west, and Livermore Valley to the east.

Watercourses draining into the Amador Valley include South San Ramon Creek, Tassajara Creek, Arroyo Mocho, Arroyo Valle, and Arroyo Las Positas, as well as runoff from Pleasanton Ridge. These waters drain south through Arroyo de la Laguna to Alameda Creek, ultimately ending up in San Francisco Bay.

== History ==
Amador Valley was once marshland characterized by tules and willow trees, with Tulare Lake at its center. Euro-American development in the 19th century reduced the marsh to Arroyo de la Laguna. The valley was named after José María Amador, a local ranchero who settled in the nearby Rancho San Ramon in 1834.
