= Arroyo Seco (Alameda County) =

Stream in Northern California

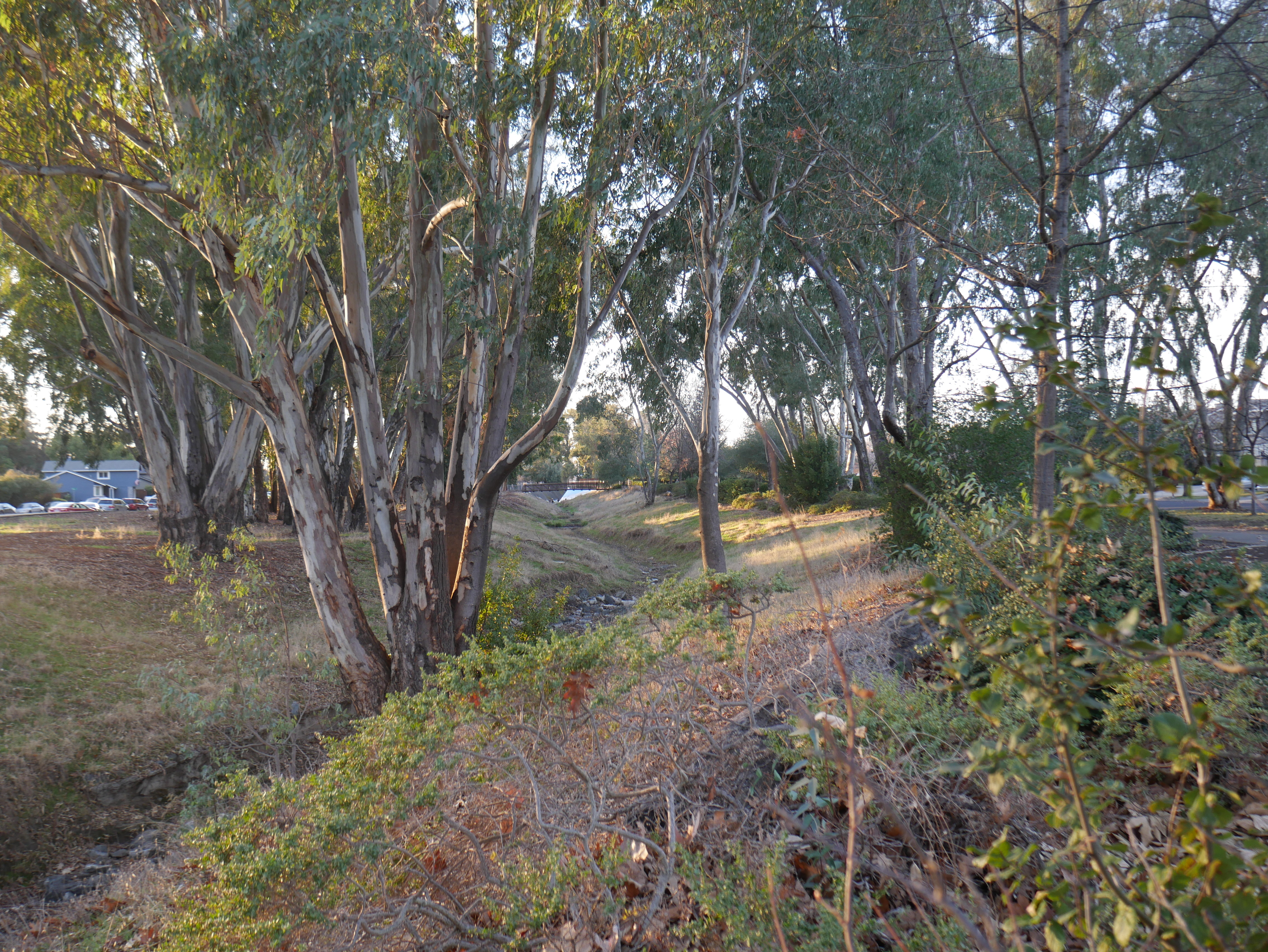
- Arroyo Seco west of Sandia National Laboratory in Livermore

- Location of the mouth in California

Location
- Country: United States
- State: California
- Region: Alameda County
- City: Livermore

Physical characteristics
- Source: spring
  - location: 8 mi (10 km) southeast of Livermore
  - coordinates: 37°39′57″N 121°36′51″W
  - elevation: 1,990 ft (610 m)
- Mouth: Arroyo Las Positas
  - location: north of Livermore
  - coordinates: 37°42′20″N 121°45′23″W
  - elevation: 482 ft (147 m)

Arroyo Seco is an 11.7-mile-long (18.8 km) watercourse in Alameda County, California, that traverses through the city of Livermore, emptying into Arroyo Las Positas. Arroyo Seco means "dry stream" in Spanish. Arroyo Seco lies above the Arroyo Seco watershed, which includes the eastern part of the city of Livermore and also the Sandia National Laboratory. The Mocho Subbasin is the largest of the subbasins in the Livermore Valley watershed. This subbasin is bounded to the west by the Livermore Fault Zone and to the east by the Tesla Fault. Some groundwater flow occurs across these fault boundaries, but flows are discontinuous below a depth of 50 feet (15 m) across the Tesla Fault and south of the Arroyo Mocho channel across the Livermore Fault. A number of threatened and endangered species reside in this watershed.

== See also ==
- Mocho Subbasin
