= List of renamed places in the United States =

These are the list of renamed places in the United States – various political and physical entities in the U.S. that have had their names changed, though not by merger, split, or any other process which was not one-to-one. It also generally does not include differences due to a change in status, for example, a "River Bluff Recreation Area" that becomes "River Bluff State Parkway".

== Alaska ==
- Mount McKinley National Park was renamed Denali National Park and Preserve in 1980 (the eponymous mountain itself was originally named Denali, then federally recognized as Mount McKinley from 1917, and then renamed Denali by the state government in 1975 and the federal government in 2015, but the federal government reverted its name for the mountain to Mount McKinley in 2025)
- Barrow was renamed Utqiaġvik in 2016, after its original Iñupiaq name.
- Black River was renamed Draanjik River after its original Gwich'in name in 2014.
- Chandalar River was renamed Ch'iidrinjik River and Teedrinjik River as replacements for the North and Middle forks of the river in 2015.
- Sheldon Point was renamed Nunam Iqua in 1999, after its original Yup'ik name.
- Willoughby District in Juneau was renamed to Aakw Kwaan Village District in 2019.

== California ==
- Acalanes is now Lafayette
- Agua Caliente is now Warner Springs
- Alvarado is now Union City
- Amador is now Dublin
- Arroyo de las Campanas is now Bell Creek
- Arroyo Salado is now Salt Creek
- Bella Vista is now Bay Point
- Botellas is now Jackson
- Branciforte County is now Santa Cruz County
- Buena Vista County is now Kern County
- Cañada de la Molina Vallejo is now Niles Canyon
- Cañada de San Diego is now Mission Valley
- Cascada is now Big Creek
- Cuesta de los Gatos is now Patchen Pass
- Dos Pueblos is now Naples
- El Alisal is now Pleasanton
- El Toro is now Lake Forest
- Río de los Reyes is now Kings River
- Laguna Grande is now Lake Elsinore
- La Mineta is now Mount Bullion
- Leodocia is now Red Bluff
- Maltermoro is now Sunnyside
- Merienda is now Dresser
- Mission San José is now Fremont
- Monte Santa Isabel is now Mount Hamilton
- Monte Vista is now Montclair
- Moro is now Taft
- Nuevo Almadén is now New Almaden
- Oleta is now Fiddletown
- Oneida is now Martell
- Oro Groso is now Coarse Gold
- Pino is now Loomis
- Port Ballona is now Playa del Rey
- Portezuela de Buenos Ayres is now Corral Hollow Pass
- Punta Arena is now Point Arena
- Rancho de la Nación is now National City
- Río de los Americanos is now American River
- Río de San Felipe is now Kern River
- Río de San Pedro is now Tule River
- Río Estanislao is now Stanislaus River
- Río Porciúncula is now Los Angeles River
- San Gorgonio is now Beaumont
- San Justo is now Hollister
- San Luis Rey is now Oceanside
- San Ysidro is now Gilroy
- Santa Ynez is now Solvang
- Sepúlveda is now North Hills
- Squaw Hill is now Loybas Hill
- Squaw Valley is now Yokuts Valley
- Todos Santos is now Concord
- Valle de Mocho is now Blackbird Valley
- Valle de San José is now Livermore Valley
- Vallecitos is now Rainbow
- Yerba Buena is now San Francisco

== Connecticut ==
- Amity became Woodbridge in 1784.
- Bantam became Litchfield in 1719.
- Chatham became East Hampton in 1915.
- Columbia Parish became Prospect in 1827.
- Conway became Portland in 1841.
- Danielsonville became Danielson in 1895.
- Dorchester became Windsor in 1637.
- East Enfield became Somers in 1734.
- East Saybrook became Lyme in 1667.
- Farmingbury became Wolcott in 1796.
- Freshwater Plantation became Enfield ≈1683.
- Furnace Village became Lakeville in 1846.
- Great Neck became Lordship ≈1650.
- Hartford Mountains became Bolton in 1720.
- Humphreysville became Seymour in 1850.
- Huntington became Shelton in 1919.
- Iron Works Village became East Haven in 1707.
- Kensington became Berlin in 1785.
- Lebanon Crank became Columbia in 1804.
- Mattabesett became Middletown in 1653.
- Middlesex Parish became Darien in 1820.
- Mill River Village became Southport in 1831.
- Mortlake became Brooklyn in 1752.
- New Cambridge became Bristol in 1785.
- New Cheshire Parish became Cheshire in 1780.
- New Concord became Bozrah in 1786.
- New Roxbury became Woodstock in 1690.
- New Scituate became Ashford in 1710.
- Newbury became Brookfield in 1787.
- Newtowne became Hartford in 1637.
- North Stratford became Trumbull in 1797.
- Northbury became Plymouth in 1795.
- Orford Parish became Manchester in 1823.
- Paugasset became Derby in 1675.
- Pimpewaug became Cannon in 1882, renamed Cannondale in 1915.
- Pomperaug Plantation became Woodbury in 1673.
- Ponde Town became Mansfield in 1702.
- Quanneapague became Newtown in 1708.
- Rippowam became Stamford in 1642.
- Salem Bridge became Naugatuck in 1844.
- Saybrook became Deep River in 1947.
- Shepaug became Roxbury in 1743.
- Sherwood's Bridge became Glenville after 1848.
- South Farms became Morris in 1859.
- South Lyme became Old Lyme in 1857.
- Stepney Parish became Rocky Hill in 1843.
- Swampfield became Danbury in 1687.
- Totoket became Branford in 1653.
- Upper Middletown became Cromwell in 1851.
- Watertown became Wethersfield in 1637.
- Wepawaug became Milford in 1640.
- West Farms became Franklin in 1786.
- Westbury became Watertown in 1780.
- Wintonbury became Bloomfield in 1835.

== Delaware ==
- Willington was changed in 1739 to Wilmington in honor of Spencer Compton, Earl of Wilmington.

== Florida ==
- Cape Canaveral was renamed Cape Kennedy between 1963 and 1973.
- Cowford (1763–1822) is now Jacksonville
- Dade County (1836–1997) is now Miami-Dade County.
- Flagler was changed to Miami before becoming official
- Ocean City (1913–1923) is now Flagler Beach (there is another Ocean City, Florida elsewhere)

== Georgia ==
- Big Shanty (to 1860s) is now Kennesaw
- Cass County (to 1860s) is now Bartow County
- Crossroads is now Vinings
- Franklin is now West Point (there is now another Franklin nearby)
- Hammond is now Sandy Springs
- Harnageville (1832–1880) is now Tate
- Jonesborough is now Jonesboro
- Lovejoy's Station is now Lovejoy
- Marble Works (to 1832) is now Tate
- Marthasville (late 1840s) is now Atlanta
- New Prospect Camp Ground is now Alpharetta
- Northcutt Station (1840–1843) is now Acworth
- Paces is now Vinings
- Rough and Ready is now Mountain View
- Ruff's Station is now Smyrna
- Terminus (mid-1840s) was later Atlanta
- Tunnelsville (1848–1856) is now Tunnel Hill
- Varner's Station is now Smyrna

== Illinois ==
- Park Forest South is now University Park.
- East Chicago Heights is now Ford Heights.
- Westhaven is now Orland Hills
- Bremen is now Tinley Park

== Indiana ==
- Hudson in DeKalb County is now Sedan. (There is another Hudson in neighboring Steuben County.)
- Iba was also a previous name for Sedan.
- Jervis or Jarvis in DeKalb County is now Butler. The town was also previously known as Oak Hill and Norristown.
- Kekionga, the capital of the Miami tribe, is now Fort Wayne.
- Newport in Wayne County is now Fountain City. It was originally called New Garden. (There is another Newport in Vermillion County.)
- Vienna in DeKalb County is now Newville.

== Iowa ==
- Valley Junction is now West Des Moines.

== Kansas ==
- Calhoun County is now Jackson County
- Lykins County is now Miami County
- Richardson County is now Wabaunsee County
- Shirley County is now Cloud County
- Weller County is now Osage County
- Wise County is now Morris County

== Kentucky ==
- Limestone was named Maysville after John May, a surveyor, clerk and land owner in the area in 1787 when the town was formed. The post office opened as "Limestone" and kept that name from 1794 to 1799.

== Louisiana ==
- Vermillionville is now Lafayette
- Brashear City is now Morgan City
- Newtown is now New Iberia
- Thibodeaux is now Thibodaux
- Charleston is now Lake Charles
- Stables is now New Llano
- Wharton is now Covington

== Massachusetts ==
- Cold Spring (1731–1761) became Belchertown (1761–Present).
- Gay Head (1870-1998) became Aquinnah (1998–Present) after residents voted to approve the name change in 1997.
- Manchester (1645–1989) became Manchester-By-The-Sea (1989–Present).
- Trimountaine (1625-1630) became Boston (1630-Present).

== Minnesota ==
- Lake Calhoun is now Bde Maka Ska.

== Mississippi ==
- Gumpond (to 1860s) is now Tupelo

== Nebraska ==
- Calhoun County is now Saunders County
- Greene County is now Seward County
- Izard County is now Stanton County
- L'Eau Qui Court County is now Knox County
- Lancaster (1856–1869) is now Lincoln in honor of Abraham Lincoln.
- Shorter County is now Lincoln County

== New Jersey ==
- New Orange is now Kenilworth
- German Valley is now Long Valley
- Vernon Valley is now Verona

== New Mexico ==
- Hot Springs is now Truth or Consequences.

== New York ==
- Despatch is now East Rochester.
- Heemstede is now Hempstead.
- Idlewild Airport is now John F. Kennedy International Airport.
- New Amsterdam (17th century) is now New York.

- Blackwell's Island became Welfare Island in 1921, and is now Roosevelt Island.
- Blythebourne is now Borough Park, Brooklyn.
- Brooklyn Village is now Brooklyn Heights, Brooklyn.
- Boswijck is now Bushwick, Brooklyn.
- Breuckelen is now Brooklyn.
- Bush Terminal is Industry City, Brooklyn.
- Conyne Eylandt is now Coney Island, Brooklyn.
- Cookie Hill is now Whitestone, Queens.
- Crow Hill is now Crown Heights, Brooklyn.
- Cuckoldstown is now Richmondtown, Staten Island.
- Elliottville is now Livingston, Staten Island.
- Gravesende is now Gravesend, Brooklyn.
- Greenwijck is now Greenwich Village, Manhattan.
- Linoleumville is now Travis, Staten Island.
- Middelburgh became Newtown, and is now Elmhurst, Queens.
- Midwout, also known as Vlackebos is now Flatbush, Brooklyn.
- Nieuw Amersfoort is now Flatlands, Brooklyn.
- Noten Eylandt (Nutten Island) is now Governors Island.
- Norton's Point is now Sea Gate, Brooklyn.
- Oostwoud is now East New York, Brooklyn.
- Pigtown is now Wingate, Brooklyn.
- Ponkiesbergh is now Cobble Hill, Brooklyn.
- Pralltown is now Chelsea, Staten Island.
- Prospect Hill is now Park Slope, Brooklyn.
- Roode Hoek is now Red Hook, Brooklyn.
- Rugby is now East Flatbush, Brooklyn.
- Rustdorp is now Jamaica, Queens.
- Union Place is now Cypress Hills, Brooklyn.
- Vlissengen is now Flushing, Queens.
- Yellow Hook is now Bay Ridge, Brooklyn.
- Yserberg (or Iron Hill) is now Todt Hill, Staten Island.

- North Tarrytown is now Sleepy Hollow.
- Quincy is now Putnam Valley.
- Reynoldsville is now Holmes.
- Smithfield is now Smithtown.
- Ulster is now Saugerties (village)

== North Carolina ==
- Clingmans Dome (prior to September 2024) is now Kuwohi.
- Hamburgh (later Hamburg) is now Glenville.
- The towns of Leaksville, Spray, and Draper were consolidated and became the city of Eden in 1967.

== North Dakota ==
- Squaw Gap is now Homesteaders Gap

== Ohio ==
- Deerfield is now South Lebanon.
- Losantiville (prior to 1790) is now Cincinnati.
- Palmyra (prior to 1835) is now Mason.
- Port Columbus International Airport (prior to 2016) is now John Glenn Columbus International Airport.

== Pennsylvania ==
- Mauch Chunk (prior to 1953) is now Jim Thorpe.
- Hickory Township (prior to 1972) is now Hermitage.

== South Carolina ==
- Charles Town (colonial period) is now Charleston.

== South Dakota ==
- Shannon County (prior to May 2015) is now Oglala Lakota County.
- Harney Peak (prior to August 2016) is now Black Elk Peak.
- Blood Run (prior to 2013) is now Good Earth in Lincoln County.

== Tennessee ==
- Clingmans Dome (prior to September 2024) is now Kuwohi.
- Coal Creek became Lake City in 1936, after the completion of Norris Dam, which created Norris Lake. Later, it was renamed to Rocky Top.

== Texas ==
- Waterloo was renamed to Austin after Stephen F. Austin in 1839 when it was chosen to be the capital of the new Republic of Texas.
- Clark was renamed to DISH after the town accepted an offer from the satellite television company Dish Network to provide free satellite television to its residents for 10 years. Despite the deal ending in 2015, the town's name remains DISH as of 2025.
- The Anahuac National Wildlife Refuge was renamed to the Jocelyn Nungaray National Wildlife Refuge in 2025, following an executive order.

== Utah ==
- The territory that became Utah was known as Deseret when first settled by Latter-Day Saints in 1847
- Parley's Park City became shortened to Park City
- Fort Utah became Provo
- The area known as Provo Bench became Orem before the city's incorporation in 1919

== Wyoming ==
- The valley in which the town of Jackson is located was originally known as Jackson's Hole and is now Jackson Hole. (The town's name has never contained the word "Hole".)
