= Tassajara Formation =

Geologic unit in Northern California

Coordinates: 37.86°N 122.00°W

The Tassajara Formation is a geologic unit within the Livermore Valley of Northern California, United States. The formation surfaces only in the northern upland parts of the Livermore Valley and underlie the central part of the valley floor at a depth ranging from 250 feet (80 m) to 700 feet (200 m). The Tassajara Formation consists of sediments ranging from brown to gray mudstone, andesitic sandstone, conglomerate, and minor bentonitic and pumiceous tuff. In the northern San Ramon area, the Tassajara Formation underlies Quaternary valley fill material.

The Bishop Subbasin is an aquifer that resides between two subsurface ridge formations of the Tassajara Formation in the northern extremity of the Amador Valley.

== See also ==
- Arroyo de la Laguna
- Arroyo Valle
- Arroyo Mocho
- Mocho Subbasin
- South San Ramon Creek
