= Niles Cone =

Groundwater basin and aquifer

Coordinates: 37°34′11.6″N 121°59′49.18″W

The Niles Cone is a groundwater basin in Alameda County, California, United States which is the source of drinking water for a sizeable human urban population in the East Bay. The land area corresponding to this groundwater basin is approximately 103 square miles; (California, 1998) the Niles Cone Basin is bounded on the east by the Diablo Range and on the west by San Francisco Bay. Surface runoff in the Alameda Creek catchment basin accounts for much of the recharge of the Niles Cone. (Niles Cone, 2007) The Alameda County Water District is responsible for management of the Niles Cone aquifer and has developed water treatment plants and pipelines for the conveyance of its waters to urban users. (Earth Metrics, 1990) The Alameda County Water District also performs water quality monitoring of the Niles Cone Basin for total dissolved solids and other parameters. (California, 2001)

== See also ==
- Arroyo de la Laguna
- Niles Canyon
- Whitfield Reservoir
- Mocho Subbasin - groundwater subbasin in the Livermore Valley.
- Bernal Subbasin - aquifer in the Livermore Valley.
