= Alameda Creek =

Alameda Creek Spanish: Arroyo de la Alameda
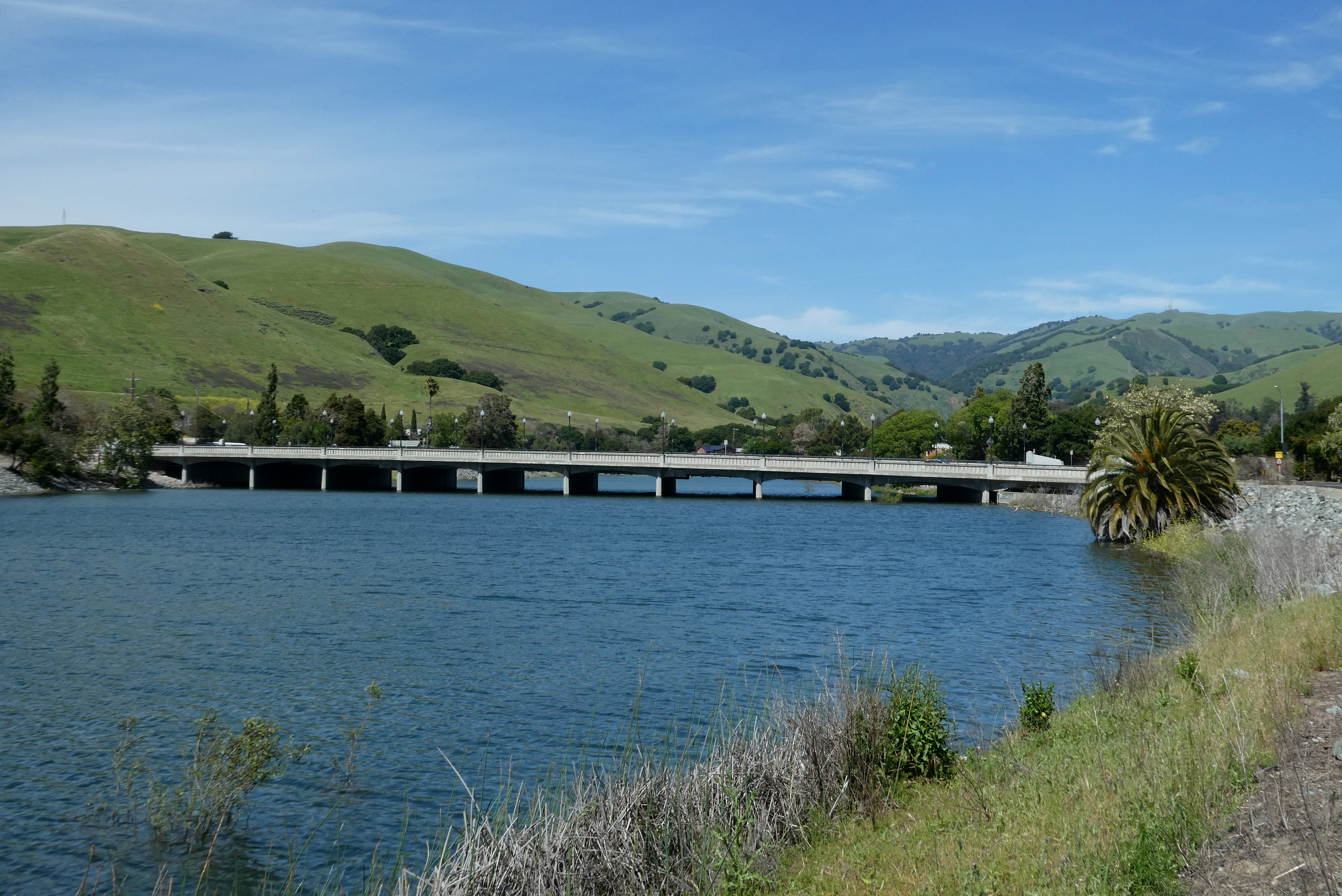
- Alameda Creek at Niles, Fremont

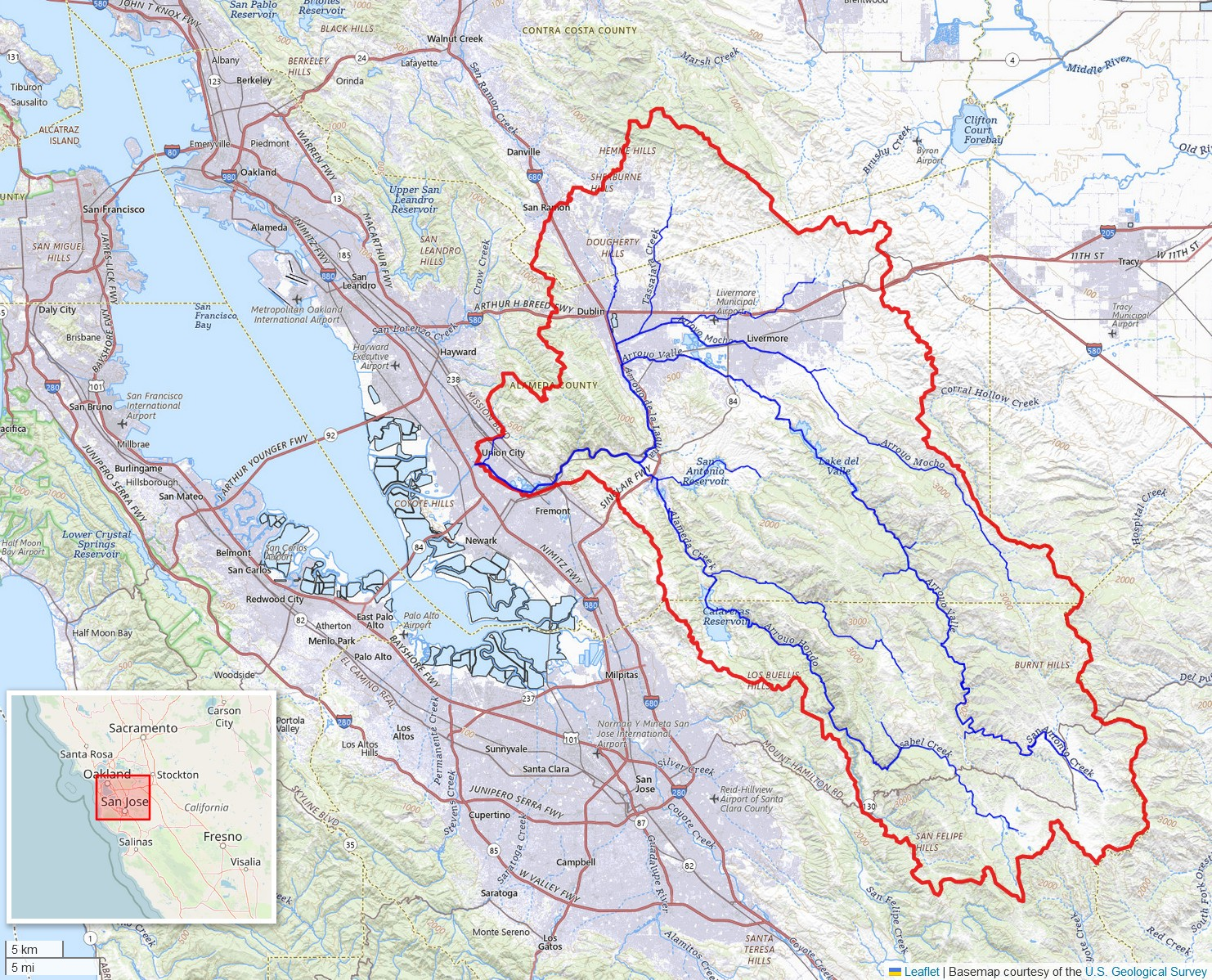
- Alameda Creek watershed (Interactive map)
- Etymology: Spanish

Location
- Country: United States
- State: California
- Region: Alameda County, Santa Clara County
- City: Union City, California

Physical characteristics
- Source: Packard Ridge in the Diablo Range
  - location: 12 miles (19 km) east of San Jose
  - coordinates: 37°23′16″N 121°36′44″W
  - elevation: 2,950 ft (900 m)
- Mouth: San Francisco Bay
  - location: Fremont
  - coordinates: 37°33′48″N 122°7′51″W (Note: These are the coordinates of the southern mouth, which as of 2023 is the creek's primary outflow. The coordinates listed by USGS are for the northern mouth in Hayward.)
  - elevation: 0 ft (0 m)
- Length: 45 mi (72 km)

Basin features
- Tributaries
  - left: Calaveras Creek
  - right: San Antonio Creek, Arroyo de la Laguna

Alameda Creek (Spanish: Arroyo de la Alameda) is a large perennial stream in the San Francisco Bay Area. The creek mainstem runs for 45 miles (72 km) from a lake northeast of Packard Ridge to the eastern shore of San Francisco Bay by way of Niles Canyon and a flood control channel. (Note: One source describes Packard Ridge as being a few miles north of Mount Hamilton and a few miles east of Rattlesnake Butte.) Along its course, Alameda Creek provides wildlife habitat, water supply, a conduit for flood waters, opportunities for recreation, and a host of aesthetic and environmental values. The creek and three major reservoirs in the watershed are used as water supply by the San Francisco Public Utilities Commission, Alameda County Water District and Zone 7 Water Agency. Within the watershed can be found some of the highest peaks (Mount Isabel and Mount Hamilton) and tallest waterfall (Murietta Falls) in the East Bay, over a dozen regional parks, and notable natural landmarks such as the cascades at Little Yosemite and the wildflower-strewn grasslands and oak savannahs of the Sunol Regional Wilderness.

After an absence of half a century, ocean-run steelhead trout are able to return to Alameda Creek to mingle with remnant rainbow trout populations. Completion of a series of dam removal and fish passage projects, along with improved stream flows for cold-water fish and planned habitat restoration, enable steelhead trout and Chinook salmon to access up to 20 miles (32 km) of spawning and rearing habitat in Alameda Creek and its tributaries. The first juvenile trout migrating downstream from the upper watershed through lower Alameda Creek toward San Francisco Bay was detected and documented in April 2023.

== History ==
Whereas other Bay Area streams flow down from, or around, mountain ranges, Alameda Creek is unique in that it cuts across the Diablo Range at Niles Canyon. To geologists this is evidence that it is an antecedent stream that existed prior to the rise of the East Bay hills about a million years ago. As the mountain range was lifted by tectonic forces, the creek kept pace by eroding the canyon, which continues to this day. The large alluvial fan under Fremont, Newark, and Union City which juts into San Francisco Bay is further evidence that this creek has been in place for a very long time.

Five Spanish expeditions led by Portolà, Ortega, Fages, Anza and Amador passed over Alameda Creek between 1769 and 1795. El Camino Viejo between Pleasanton and Mission Pass crossed it near Sunol. Mission San José, in Fremont, was dedicated in 1797. The Mission thrived for 49 years until the Mexican government's Secularization Order liquidated mission lands in 1834. Alameda Creek was the boundary of the mission lands and the 17,000-acre (69 km^{2}) Rancho Arroyo de la Alameda granted to Jose de Jesus Vallejo, who built a flour mill near the mouth of Niles Canyon. The mill and the importance of the canyon as a passage through the hills led to growth of Niles (which in 1956 became part of Fremont, California) in the 1850s. A favorable climate, excellent soils, and a fast-growing population helped agriculture to boom. Early roads led to landings where small ships would load grain and other foodstuffs for transport to market.

Alameda Creek is the most important stream in Alameda County, which was named after it. It was the boundary between Contra Costa and Santa Clara counties between 1850, when Contra Costa and Santa Clara counties were formed, to 1853, when Alameda County was carved from the two counties. The portion of Alameda County south of Alameda Creek is the only part of Alameda County that is not derived from Contra Costa County.

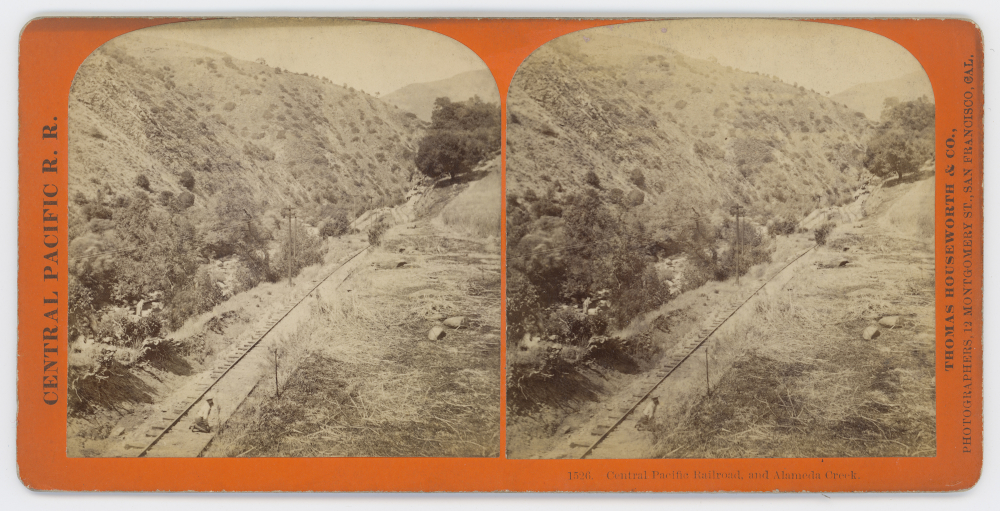
Central Pacific Railroad, and Alameda Creek. Stereo photo taken between 1867 and 1869.

Completion of the Central Pacific Railroad through Niles Canyon in 1869 was essential to completion of First transcontinental railroad that terminated at Alameda Terminal and Oakland Long Wharf that same year. The Western Pacific was also routed through Niles Canyon, connecting Sacramento, California and San Jose, California in 1906.

The creek bed had once been used as a gravel quarry. When the gravel pits were flooded by water purchased by the public for groundwater recharge of the Niles Cone, the gravel harvesters began to daily pump out enough water to meet the needs of 30,000 people down the creek into San Francisco Bay. After the pumping was declared to be an illegal waste the Alameda County Water District acquired the quarry in 1975.

In May 2015, vandals damaged an inflatable dam across the creek in Fremont, releasing 50 million gallons (190 million litres) of drinking water into San Francisco Bay.

== Alameda Creek watershed ==
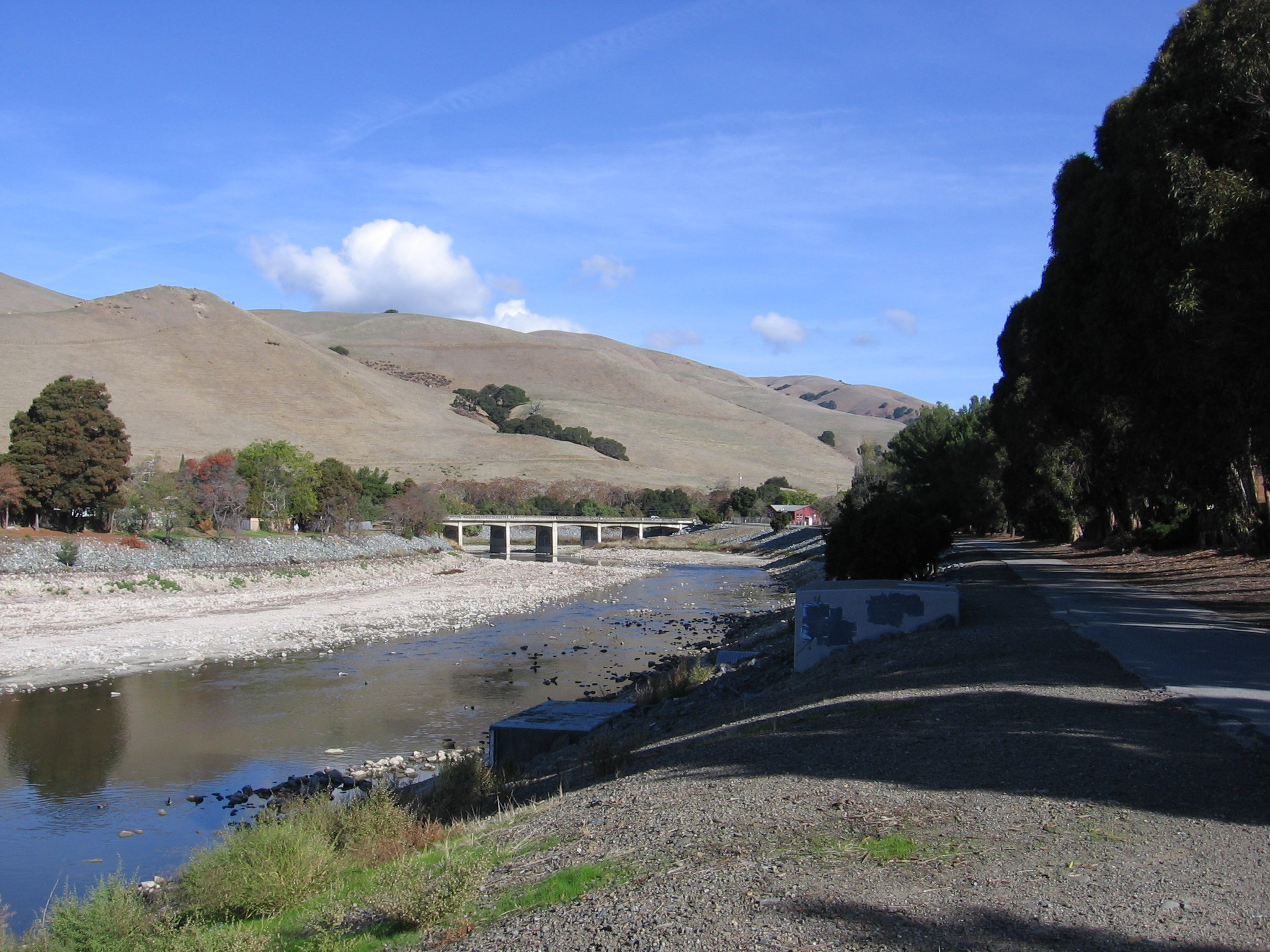
Alameda Creek at the flats of Niles where it has emerged from the Niles Canyon

After the Sacramento and San Joaquin Rivers, Alameda Creek is the largest watershed draining into San Francisco Bay, with a total watershed of 700 square miles (1,800 km^{2}). It contributes about 20% of the total drainage area for the South Bay. Two-thirds of the watershed is in Alameda County including the reach through the Sunol Valley, the rest is in Santa Clara County. The tributaries of Alameda creek include Arroyo de la Laguna, Arroyo Valle, San Antonio Creek and Calaveras Creek, whose main tributary is Arroyo Hondo. The watershed includes three man-made reservoirs: Lake Del Valle, San Antonio Reservoir and Calaveras Reservoir.

The Alameda Creek Watershed can be divided into six major reaches:

- Alameda Creek Flood Control Channel – the channelized, trapezoidal section extending from the Bay upstream to the Niles Canyon area
- Niles Canyon – the area above the flood control section to the confluence of the Alameda Creek mainstem and Arroyo de la Laguna
- Upper Alameda Creek (above the confluence with Arroyo de la Laguna) – the reach extending up the mainstem of Alameda Creek into the canyons of the Sunol-Ohlone Regional Wilderness Area and beyond
- Arroyo de la Laguna – the reach paralleling Interstate 680 upstream of the confluence with the mainstem Alameda Creek, including the Alamo Canal, to its source at the confluence of South San Ramon Creek and Arroyo Mocho
- Arroyo Valle – the reach extending from the confluence with Arroyo de la Laguna upstream through Shadow Cliffs Regional Park to Del Valle Regional Park
- Arroyo Mocho – the reach extending upstream from the confluence with Arroyo de la Laguna through the Livermore–Amador Valley and into unincorporated ranch and agricultural lands

A more comprehensive list inclusive of minor as well as major named tributaries includes (from top of mainstem heading downstream) Valpe Creek (right), Bear Gulch (right), Whitlock Creek (right), Calaveras Creek (left), Leyden Creek (left), Indian Joe Creek (right), Welch Creek (right), Haynes Gulch (left), Pirate Creek (left), San Antonio Creek (right), Arroyo de la Laguna (right), Stonybrook Canyon (right) and Dry Creek (right). Alameda Creek now runs through the man-made Alameda Creek flood channel near the Bay, the latter is parallel to and south of the old Alameda Creek channel. Ward Creek is a tributary to old Alameda Creek.

== Ecology, past and present ==
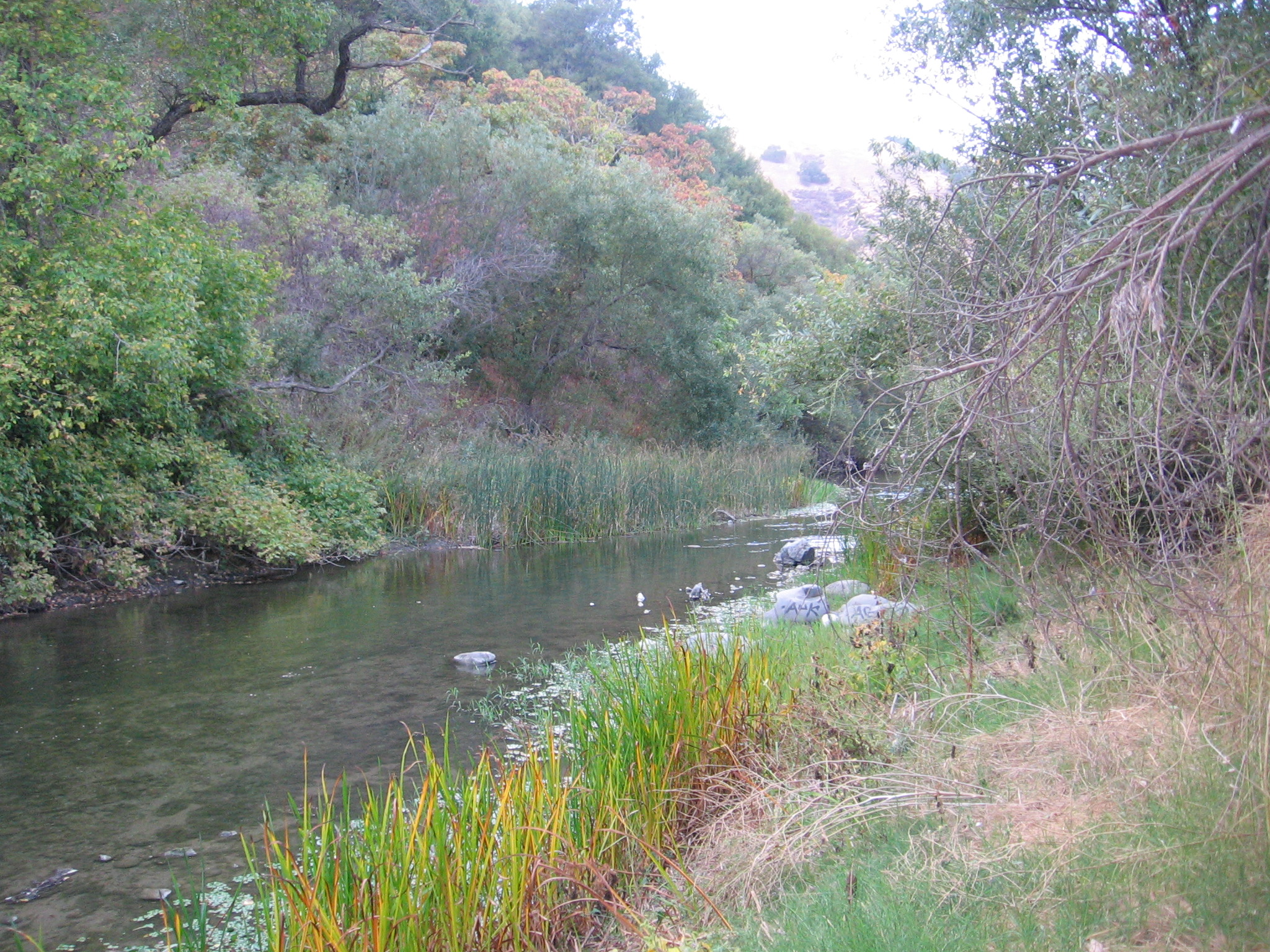
Alameda Creek in Niles Canyon.

Alameda Creek historically supported spawning runs of at least three salmonid species: steelhead (the anadromous form of the coastal rainbow trout Oncorhynchus mykiss irideus), coho salmon (Oncorhynchus kisutch) and Chinook salmon (Oncorhynchus tshawytscha).

=== Return of Steelhead and Salmon ===
Alameda Creek is considered a potential 'anchor watershed' for steelhead, regionally significant for restoration of the threatened trout to the entire Bay Area, although by the late 1950s the California Department of Fish and Game decided the steelhead run was no longer viable due to numerous man-made barriers to fish runs. By the early 1970s the Army Corps of Engineers channeled and rip-rapped the lower 12 miles (19 km) of the creek. The last steelhead and coho salmon runs in the 20th century were seen in the lower creek in 1964, the latter confirmed by photographic records.

Confirmation that adult steelhead captured attempting to migrate into the Alameda Creek watershed, and the rainbow trout sampled in the upper watershed (trapped above complete migration barriers), were native fish associated with the federally threatened steelhead Central California Coast Evolutionarily Significant Unit spurred a major effort to restore this historically important steelhead stream by removing barriers to migration and improving habitat quality. Since steelhead in the Bay Area and California's Central Coast were listed as threatened under the Endangered Species Act in 1997, numerous organizations, including the Alameda Creek Alliance, and governmental agencies have cooperated on restoration projects to allow migratory fish from the Bay to reach spawning habitat in upper Alameda Creek, beginning in 1999. This coalition of agencies and organizations is called the Alameda Creek Fisheries Restoration Workgroup.

In 2009, the Alameda County Water District removed a rubber dam that blocked trout passage in the lower creek, adjacent to Quarry Lakes Regional Park. In June, 2010 environmentalists and water district officials celebrated the removal of a dam on Alameda Creek in Fremont, and the planned installation of fish ladders to allow salmonids to bypass two other dams on the lower creek. At the same time, PG&E worked to modify a cement barrier farther upstream in Sunol to help steelhead swim farther into the watershed, water officials said. Ground was broken on the first ladder the Alameda County Water District was building in April 2018, just west of the Mission Boulevard overcrossing in the Niles district of Fremont, allowing passage around a rubber dam. The second ladder, which was planned to start construction in 2019, is about a mile downstream at the concrete structure, called a weir. The two ladders were funded by nearly $10 million in grants from several agencies, including $5.36 million from the California Wildlife Conservation Board and $3 million from the California Natural Resources Agency. The goal was that when those projects were completed in 2021, steelhead would be able to migrate upstream to spawning habitats in the Sunol Valley for the first time in a half-century.

In April 2023, one juvenile steelhead was found in the creek. The following year, monitoring by the San Francisco Public Utilities Commission recorded 50 tagged steelhead making the migration up Alameda Creek to the San Francisco Bay.

By November 2025, Chinook salmon (Oncorhynchus tshawytscha) had also ascended mainstem Alameda Creek into and beyond Niles Canyon, for the first time in decades, thanks to removal of the above weirs and dams. At least one salmon was seen 20 miles (32 km) upstream mainstem Alameda Creek.

=== Other fish ===
California's archaeological record has contributed to knowledge of the prehistoric distribution of fishes in Alameda Creek and its tributaries including Sacramento perch (Archoplites interruptus), Sacramento suckers (Catostomus occidentalis occidentalis), Tule perch (Hysterocarpus traskii), Hitches (Lavinia exilicauda), Hardheads (Mylopharodon conocephalus), Sacramento blackfish, and Sacramento pikeminnow (Ptychocheilus grandis). Recent physical evidence has proved that the southern limit of coastal Chinook salmon included the southernmost tributaries of South San Francisco Bay. Many of these fishes still occupy the creek.

In 2023, a likely new species of lamprey (Lampetra sp.) was discovered in Alameda Creek by mitochondrial DNA genetic testing.

The number of introduced exotic fishes continues to increase in Alameda Creek and other San Francisco Bay tributaries with man-made reservoirs. Exotic fish species such as the largemouth and smallmouth basses (Micropterus salmoides and Micropterus dolomieui) respectively, were introduced to Alameda Creek (and the Napa River) by Livingston Stone in 1874.

=== Beaver ===
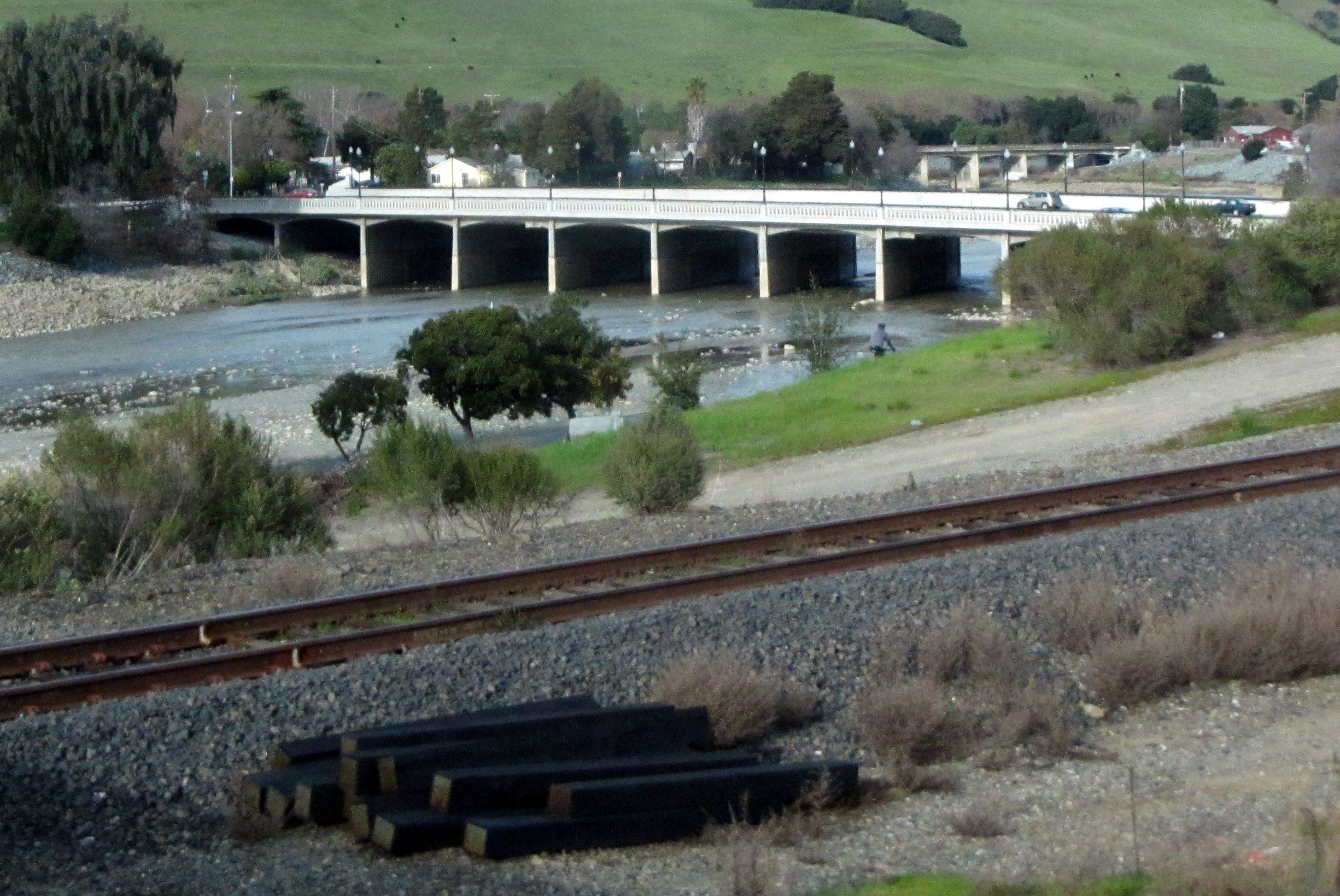
A view of the Mission Blvd bridge at Alameda Creek.

There is historical evidence of beaver in the Alameda Creek watershed. In 1828 fur trapper Michel Laframboise travelled to "the missions of San José, San Francisco Solano and San Rafael Arcángel. La Framboise stated that "the Bay of San Francisco abounds in beaver", and that he "made his best hunt in the vicinity of the missions". Alexander Roderick McLeod reported on the progress of the first Hudson's Bay Company fur brigade sent to California in 1829, "Beaver is become an article of traffic on the Coast as at the Mission of St. Joseph alone upwards of Fifteen hundred Beaver Skins were collected from the natives at a trifling value and sold to Ships at 3 Dollars". In the 1840s Kit Carson was granted rights to trap beaver on Alameda Creek in the East Bay where they "abounded...from the mouth of its canyon to the broad delta on the bay". Physical evidence of beaver include faunal remains in the Arroyo de la Laguna tributary recovered in an archaeological site west of Interstate 680. Beaver may be beneficial to efforts to restore salmonids in Alameda Creek as beaver ponds benefit oversummering salmonid smolts by raising the water table which then recharges streams in the dry summer season and also by providing perennial deep pools when streams are only seasonal.

== Conservation ==
In January, 2011, the San Francisco Public Utilities Commission won approvals to construct a replacement dam just downstream from the existing earthen Calaveras Dam, which has been maintained at 40% of capacity because of seismic concerns. However, construction of a fish ladder to provide steelhead (Oncorhynchus mykiss) access to the waters above the dam were deemed not feasible because at 290 feet (88 m), it would be the tallest fish ladder in the country, and would cost $40 million. Steelhead have not had access to spawning streams above Calaveras Dam since it was built in 1925. However, environmentalists won concessions from the SFPUC to assure adequate water releases from the new dam to improve summer flows as well as a smaller fish ladder around a diversion dam blocking access to upper Alameda Creek, which is regarded as prime trout habitat. The San Francisco Public Utilities Commission removed two disused dams in the Niles Canyon reach of Alameda Creek to improve fish passage following assessing impacts in an Environmental Impact Report under CEQA.

Downstream of San Francisco's dams, the Alameda Creek Alliance has helped to initiate the removal of 11 barriers to fish passage since 2001. In 2019, Alameda County Water District (ACWD) completed a fish ladder at an inflatable rubber dam one mile upstream of the BART weir in the flood control channel. This left one remaining barrier to spawning runs of steelhead trout and Chinook salmon into the watershed at the BART weir and a second inflatable rubber dam. In April 2022, the AWCD and Alameda County Flood Control District finished construction of the Alameda Creek Flood Control Drop Structure Fish Ladder, enabling salmonids to surmount the 12-foot cement drop structure at the BART weir and eliminating the final barrier to their in-migration into the watershed after half a century.

== Alameda Creek Regional Trail ==
The Alameda Creek Regional Trail runs along Alameda Creek for 12 miles (19 km). The trail starts in the Niles neighborhood of Fremont and continues westward to the San Francisco Bay through the cities of Union City and Newark. The trail consists of two parallel paths, one on each side of Alameda Creek. The path on the south side of the creek is paved, and can be used by pedestrians and bicyclists. The path on the north side of the creek is unpaved, and can be used by pedestrians, bicyclists, and equestrians. The trail provides direct access to Coyote Hills Regional Park and Quarry Lakes Regional Recreation Area. A connection to the Bay Area Ridge Trail is planned.

== See also ==
- California Fur Rush
- List of watercourses in the San Francisco Bay Area
- Niles Cone
