= Tassajara, California =

Unincorporated community in California, United States

Tassajara
- Unincorporated community
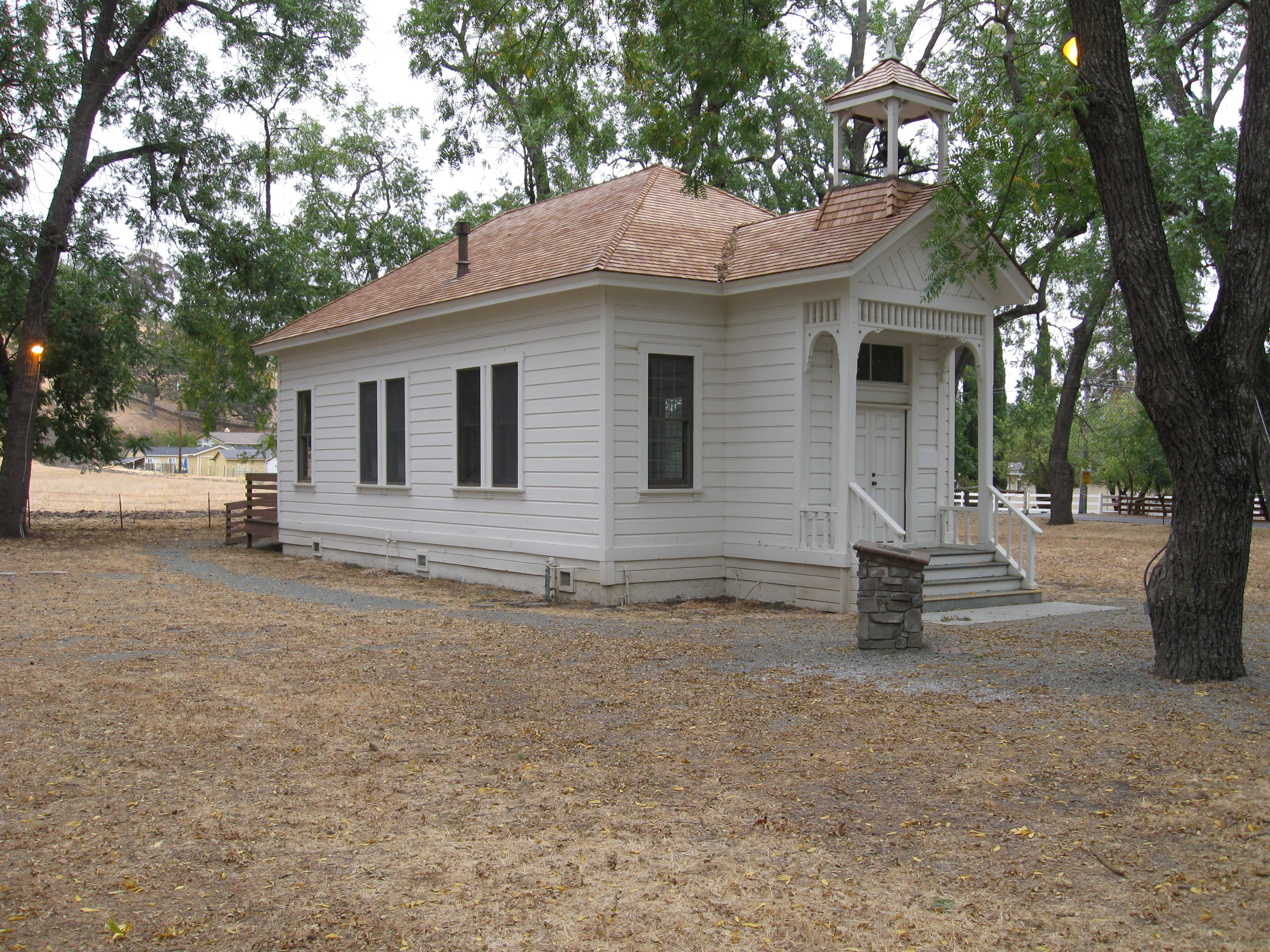
- Tassajara School from 1889

- Location in California
- Coordinates: 37°47′45″N 121°51′49″W
- Country: United States
- State: California
- County: Contra Costa
- Elevation: 709 ft (216 m)
- GNIS ID: 253965
- FIPS code: 06-77973

Tassajara, a variation of the Spanish word "tasajera" (Spanish for "place where the meat is hung" or "meat drier"), is an unincorporated community in Contra Costa County, California, United States. It is located on the eastern bank of Tassajara Creek, 6.5 miles (10 km) south-southeast of Mount Diablo, at an elevation of 709 feet (216 m). Together with Blackhawk it forms the Blackhawk-Camino Tassajara census designated place (CDP).

== History ==
Until 1959, it was known as Tassajero;.

A post office operated at Tassajara from 1896 to 1922.

== Census county division ==
Tassajara is also the name of the wider unincorporated census county division (CCD) located on the eastern side of Mount Diablo in central Contra Costa County, California. The area covers approximately 153 square miles (400 km^{2}), much of it open space, and contains the southern portion of Mount Diablo State Park, the Black Diamond Mines, Morgan Territory, Round Valley and Vasco Caves regional preserves, as well as the Los Vaqueros reservoir.
