= Blackbird Valley =

Valley in California, United States

Coordinates: 37°26′31″N 121°31′11″W

Blackbird Valley, earlier known as "Valle de Mocho", is a valley south of Mount Mocho in the Diablo Range in Santa Clara County, California. It lies at an elevation of 2,552 foot / 778 meters.

== History ==
Valle Mocho was an overnight stop for droves of horses taken south on La Vereda del Monte by mesteñeros and the horse gangs of Joaquin Murrieta. According to Frank F. Latta, the Valle de Mocho was named after the Murrieta gang member in charge of their station in the valley, Avalino Martínez. Martinez was known by his nickname, "Mocho" (meaning cut off or short) for his diminutive four feet, four inch, stature. The Arroyo Mocho and the nearby peak Mount Mocho were also named after him.
