= Tesla Fault =

Geological fault in California

Coordinates: 37.579°N 121.564°W

The Tesla Fault can be found in the northeastern Diablo Range, California. This fault is only semi-active.

== Geology ==
This fault has been demonstrated to have a dextral offset of 8.5 kilometers (5.3 mi) and is closely associated with the Greenville Fault.

== Mocho Subbasin ==
The Tesla Fault forms the eastern boundary of the large aquifer known as the Mocho Subbasin. Some groundwater flow of the Mocho Subbasin occurs across the Tesla fault boundary, but flows are discontinuous below a depth of 50 feet (15 m) across the Tesla Fault.

== See also ==
- Arroyo Valle
- Tassajara Formation
