= Mocho Subbasin =

Coordinates: 37°41′1.75″N 121°46′15.92″W

The Mocho Subbasin is the largest of the groundwater subbasins in the watershed of the Livermore Valley in Northern California. This subbasin is bounded to the west by the Livermore Fault Zone and to the east by the Tesla Fault. Some groundwater flow occurs across these fault boundaries, but flows are discontinuous below a depth of fifty feet across the Tesla Fault and south of the Arroyo Mocho channel across the Livermore Fault. Surface watercourses in this unit include Arroyo Valle and Arroyo Seco.

== Aquifer details ==
To the north, the Tiago Macheira Subbasin contacts the Tassajara Formation, with which no groundwater exchange occurs. Groundwater flow in the subbasin is generally from southeast toward the northwest or north, corresponding to the slope of the regional terrain and water table surface. Uncontained shallow groundwater occurs within 25 feet (8 m) of the surface, while deeper confined water has levels that occur at various depths from 75 feet (20 m) to 150 feet (50 m) below the surface.

== Groundwater quality ==
Water quality in the subbasin is generally fair with regard to sodium bicarbonate and magnesium bicarbonate, However, the trend in adverse water quality due to total dissolved solids indicates unpotable conditions may exist as early as 2020 due to overpopulation of the Livermore-Amador Valley by humans and associated discharge of salts to the groundwater.

== Geology ==
This subbasin is in the vicinity of the seismically active Greenville Fault associated with the Diablo Range. In fact the name of the second segment of the Greenville Fault (starting from north to south) is the Arroyo Mocho Segment. The Arroyo Mocho Segment is generally considered to be more well developed and not as youthful as traces delineating the Marsh Creek-Greenville Segment, for example.

== See also ==
- Bishop Subbasin
- Hacienda Business Park
- Niles Cone - groundwater basin in Alameda County.
- Bernal Subbasin - aquifer in the Livermore Valley.
