= Beauregard Creek =

Stream in California, United States

Coordinates: 37°22′05″N 121°29′19″W

Beauregard Creek is a stream located in the U.S. state of California. It is located in Santa Clara County.
