= Arroyo Las Positas =

Westward-flowing watercourse in Alameda County, California

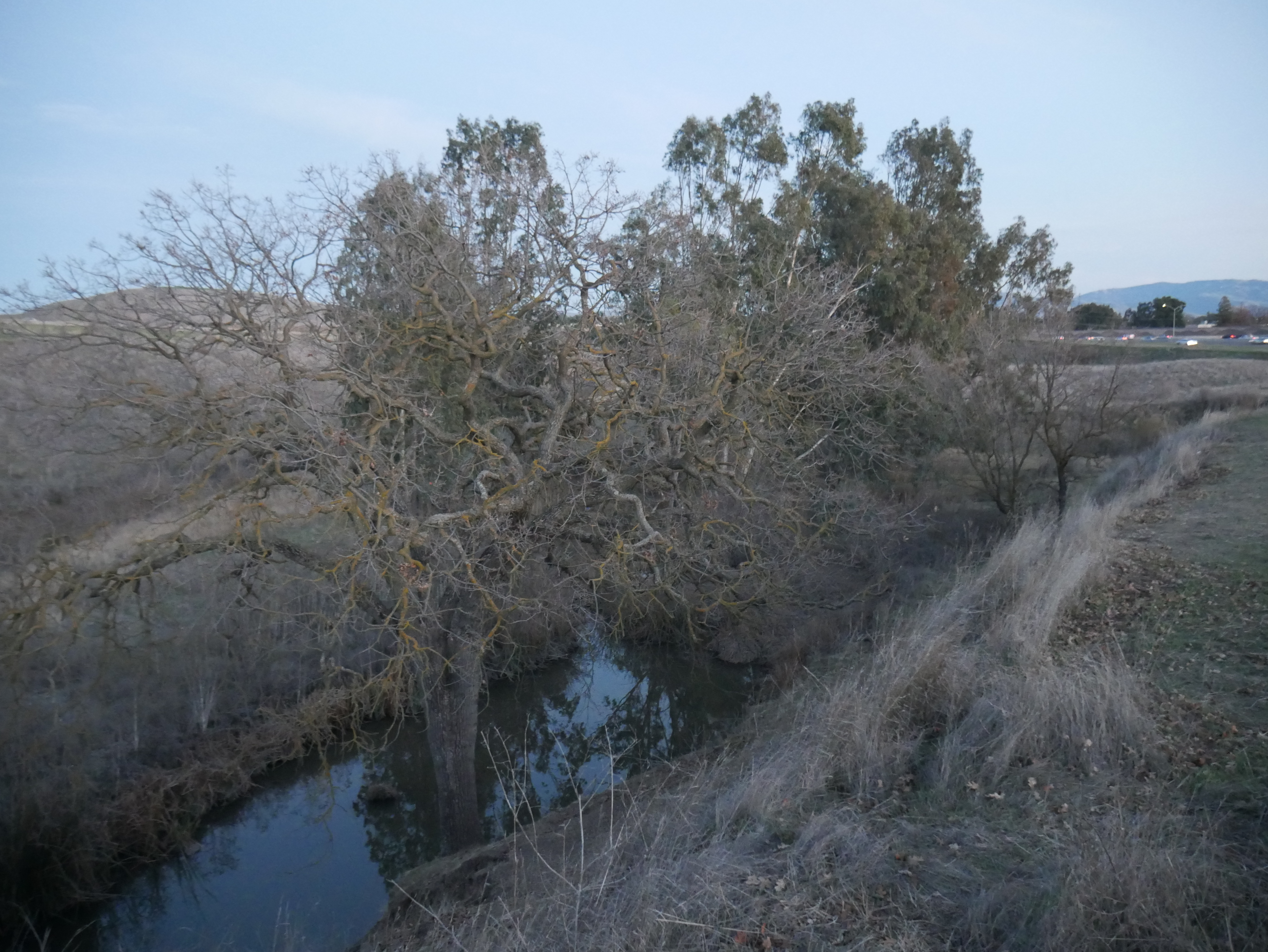
- Arroyo Las Positas near its beginning, with Interstate 580 in the background.

- Location of the mouth in California
- Etymology: Spanish

Location
- Country: United States
- State: California
- Region: Alameda County
- Cities: Livermore, Dublin

Physical characteristics
- Source: confluence
  - location: north of Livermore
  - coordinates: 37°42′20″N 121°45′18″W
  - elevation: 482 ft (147 m)
- Mouth: Arroyo Mocho
  - location: north of Dublin
  - coordinates: 37°41′41″N 121°51′34″W
  - elevation: 348 ft (106 m)

Arroyo Las Positas is a 7.4-mile-long (11.9 km) westward-flowing watercourse in Alameda County, California, which begins at the confluence of Arroyo Seco and Cayetano Creek north of Livermore, and empties into Arroyo Mocho in Dublin, California.

== See also ==
- List of watercourses in the San Francisco Bay Area
