= Mount Mocho =

Mountain in California, United States

Coordinates: 37°27′20″N 121°29′40″W

Mount Mocho is a summit in the Diablo Range, in Santa Clara County, California. It rises to an elevation 3,665 feet / 1,117 meters.
