= Mount Stakes =

Mountain in the state of California

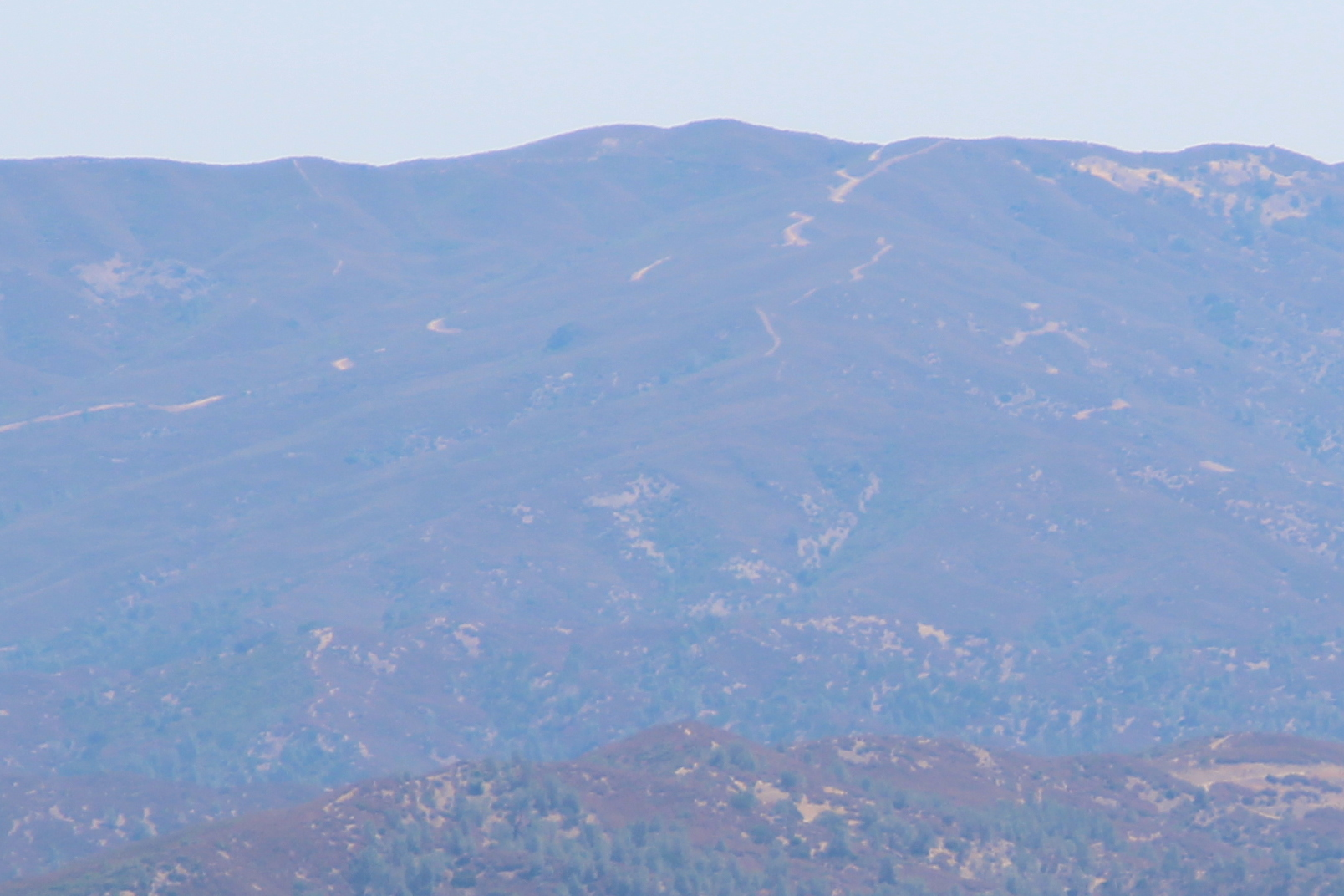
- Mount Stakes viewed from Mount Hamilton

Highest point
- Elevation: 3,810 ft (1,161 m) NAVD 88
- Prominence: 1,404 ft (428 m)
- Listing: California county high points 48th
- Coordinates: 37°19′20″N 121°24′31″W

Geography
- Location within California
- Location: Santa Clara and Stanislaus counties, California, U.S.
- Parent range: Diablo Range
- Topo map: USGS Mount Stakes

Mount Stakes is a mountain in the Diablo Range in California. The peak is located on the Santa Clara–Stanislaus county line and is located less than 1 mile north of Henry W. Coe State Park. It rises to an elevation of 3,810 feet (1,161 m) and is the highest point in Stanislaus County. It is 22 miles (35 km) west of Newman and 32 miles (51 km) southeast of Livermore. Some snow falls on the peak during the winter.

== See also ==
- Media related to Mount Stakes at Wikimedia Commons
- List of highest points in California by county
- List of summits of the San Francisco Bay Area
