= Lake Del Valle =

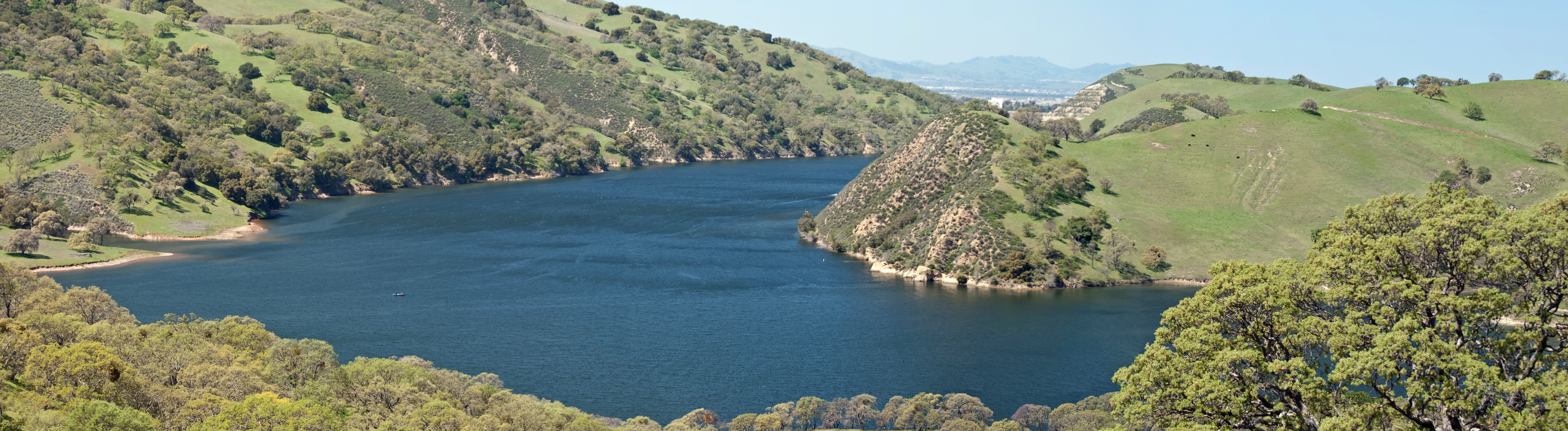
- Lake Del Valle

- Location within California Location within the United States
- Location: Alameda County, California
- Coordinates: 37°35′54″N 121°43′16″W
- Type: reservoir
- Basin countries: United States
- Max. length: 5 miles (8.0 km)
- Surface area: 708 acres (287 ha)
- Max. depth: 153 feet (47 m)
- Water volume: 77,100 acre-feet (95,100,000 m^{3})
- Shore length^{1}: 16 miles (26 km)
- Settlements: Livermore, California
- ^{1} Shore length is not a well-defined measure.

Lake Del Valle is a storage reservoir located 10 miles (16 km) southeast of Livermore, in Alameda County, California. It is within Del Valle Regional Park.

== Lake description ==
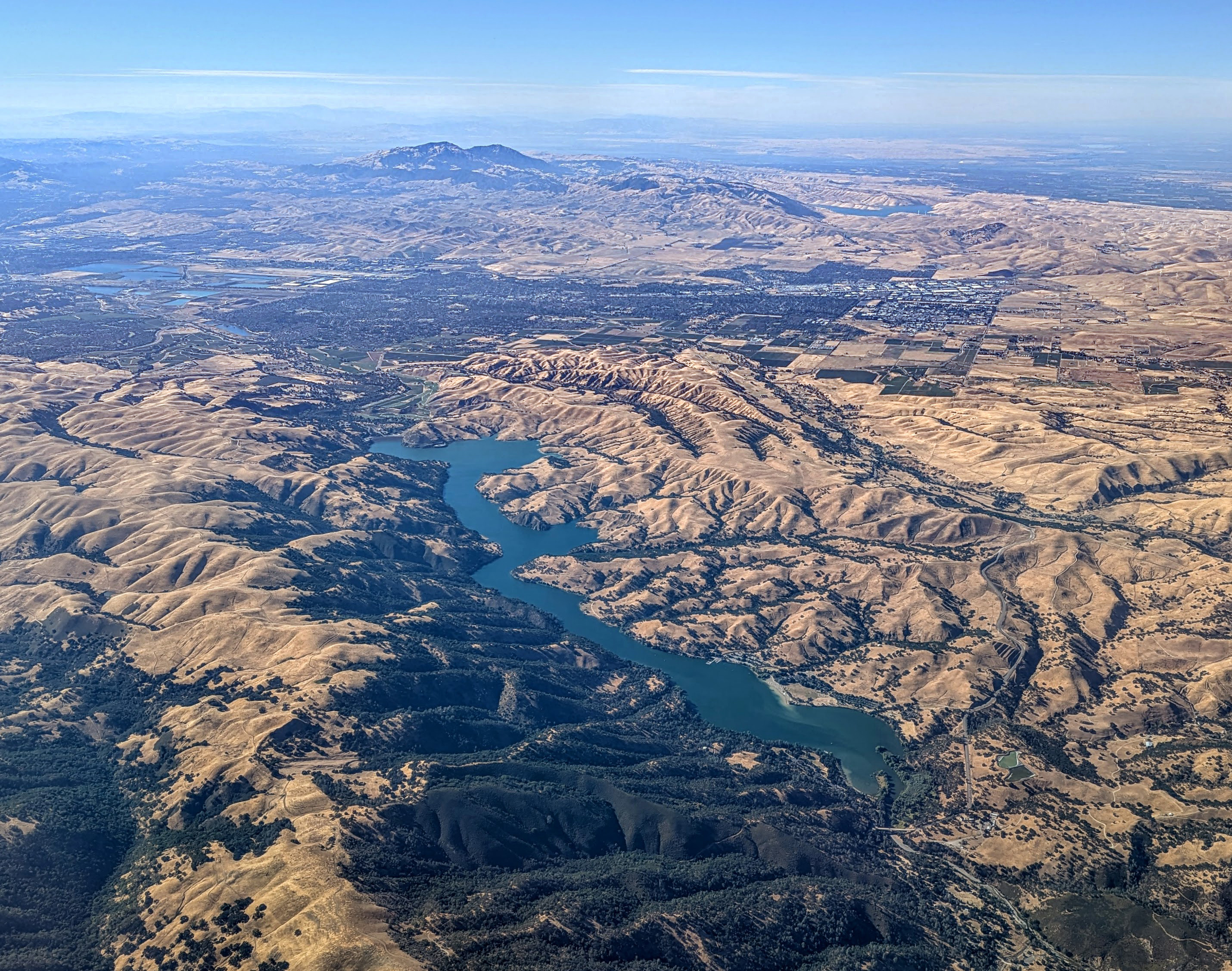
Aerial view of Lake Del Valle and Del Valle Regional Park, with Livermore and Mount Diablo in the distance

The lake is on Arroyo Valle (Spanish for "creek of the valley") in the Diablo Range, and is formed by Del Valle Dam, completed in 1968 (58 years ago).

The lake and dam are part of the California State Water Project, as part of the South Bay Aqueduct. The lake serves in part as off-stream storage for the South Bay Aqueduct. The capacity of the lake is 77,000 acre-feet (95,000,000 m^{3}), however, the lake has a flood storage of 25,000 to 40,000 acre-feet (31,000,000 to 49,000,000 m^{3}). Thus normally stores 37,000 to 52,000 acre-feet (46,000,000 to 64,000,000 m^{3}). The lake is a popular destination for hikers, bikers, and boaters.

The Hetch Hetchy Aqueduct passes below the lake, but does not connect to it.

The California Office of Environmental Health Hazard Assessment issued a fishing advisory regarding the mercury levels of fish caught from the body of water.

== Dam description ==
The dam is 230 feet (70 m) high and 880 feet (270 m) long. Its crest elevation is 773 feet (236 m). The dam contains 4,150,000 cubic yards (3,170,000 m^{3}) of earth fill.

== See also ==
- List of dams and reservoirs in California
- List of lakes in California
- List of lakes in the San Francisco Bay Area
