= Arroyo Mocho =

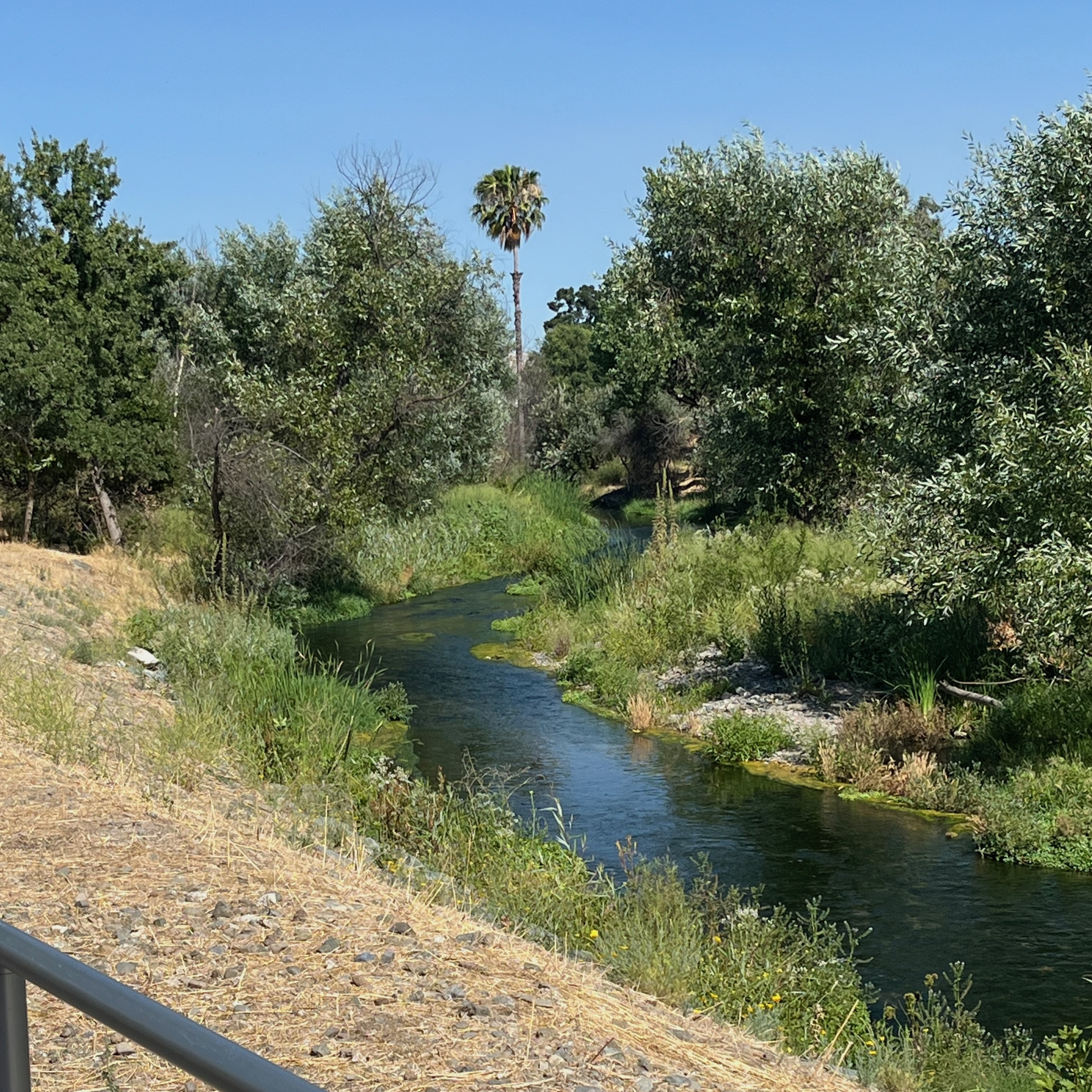
- The Arroyo Mocho as it passes through Livermore

- Location of the mouth of Arroyo Mocho in California

Location
- Country: United States
- State: California
- Counties: Alameda County & Santa Clara County
- Cities: Pleasanton & Livermore

Physical characteristics
- Source: Mount Mocho
  - location: 18 mi (30 km) east of Milpitas
  - coordinates: 37°27′13″N 121°31′22″W
  - elevation: 3,160 ft (960 m)
- Mouth: Confluence with South San Ramon Creek to form Arroyo de la Laguna
  - location: Pleasanton, California
  - coordinates: 37°40′37″N 121°54′44″W
  - elevation: 315 ft (96 m)

Arroyo Mocho is a 34.7-mile-long (55.8 km) stream which originates in the far northeastern corner of Santa Clara County and flows northwesterly into eastern Alameda County, California. After traversing the cities of Livermore and Pleasanton it joins South San Ramon Creek to become Arroyo de la Laguna, which in turn flows to Alameda Creek and thence to San Francisco Bay.

== History ==
Arroyo Mocho means "cutoff creek". Erwin G. Gudde's California Place Names says it got the name because it historically had no outlet but dissipated into the ground after spreading out into many smaller streams between Livermore and Pleasanton. As early as 1852 it was also called Mocho Creek. Frank Latta, in his book on Joaquin Murrieta, says it got its name from the nickname of the man who ran the Murrietta gang's water stations and holding corrals in this area along La Vereda del Monte, the route of their drives of captured mustangs and stolen horses to the south. These stations were on the arroyo near Mud Springs and at Valle de Mocho, what is now known as Blackbird Valley, near the source of the arroyo, just south of Mount Mocho, which was also named for this man, known as "Mocho" (meaning lopped off or short) for his diminutive stature.

== Watershed and course ==
The Arroyo Mocho watershed drains 50 square miles (130 km^{2}). Arroyo Mocho originates on the western slope of 3,684 feet (1,123 m) Mount Mocho in the far northeast corner of Santa Clara County and flows west to Mines Road which it follows northwest into Alameda County. It passes rural woodland and grassland along Mines Road. It passes Sweet Springs, a magnesia spring near Mines Road known for its sweet taste. Although historically it sank into the area between Livermore and Pleasanton now the site of multiple gravel pits, there is an engineered channel connecting it to Arroyo de la Laguna.

The underlying aquifer is the Mocho Subbasin, whose eastern boundary is the Tesla Fault. Some groundwater flow occurs across this fault boundary, but flows are discontinuous below a depth of 50 feet (15 m) across the Tesla Fault and south of the Arroyo Mocho channel across the Livermore Fault.

Major watercourses feeding the Arroyo Mocho include the Alamo, Tassajara, Cayetano, Altamont, Arroyo Seco, and Las Positas Creeks.

== Ecology and geology ==
Arroyo Mocho has a self-sustaining rainbow trout (Oncorhynchus mykiss) population, and trout can migrate to the lower watershed from Alameda Creek.

Channels in the Arroyo Mocho watershed are mostly in the forms of arroyos and gullies: characterized as cuts into a broad valley floor, with steep eroding banks. Elevations in the Arroyo Mocho basin are between 60 and 1200 meters; mean annual precipitation is 428 mm on average.

== Gallery ==
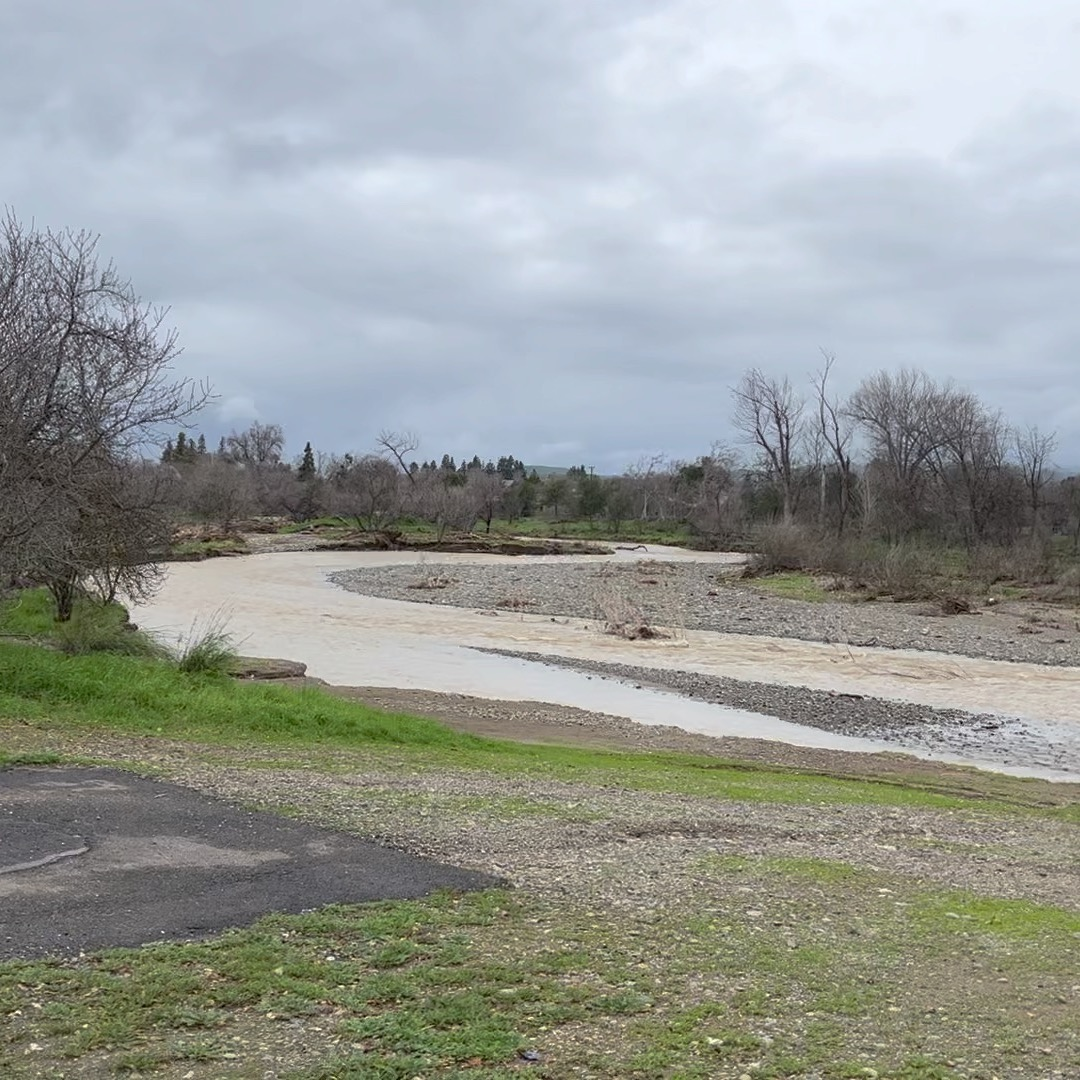
Arroyo Mocho flooding during the 2022–2023 California floods.

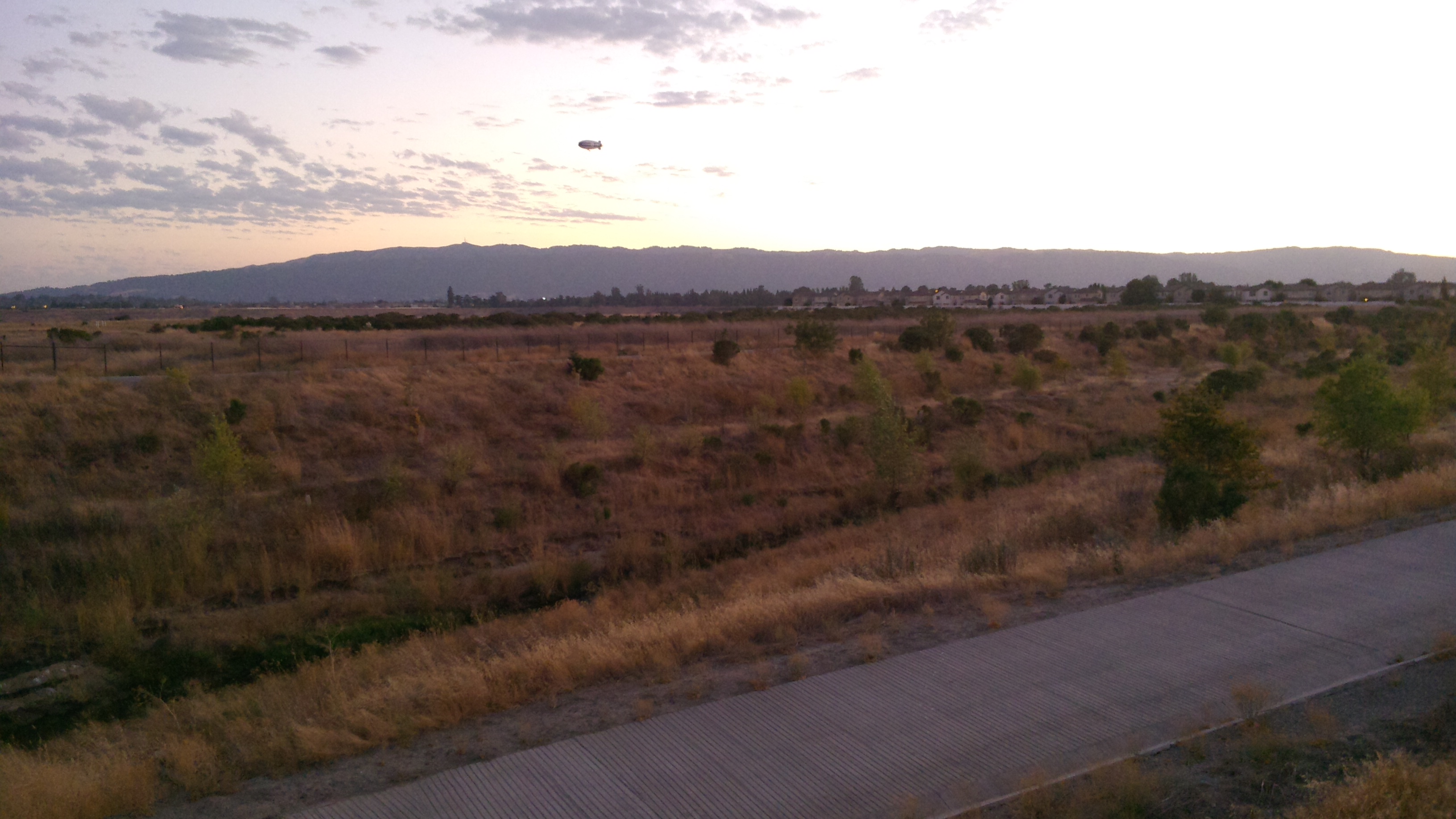
Arroyo Mocho at dusk flowing under the El Charro Rd. bridge. Pleasanton Ridge in the background.

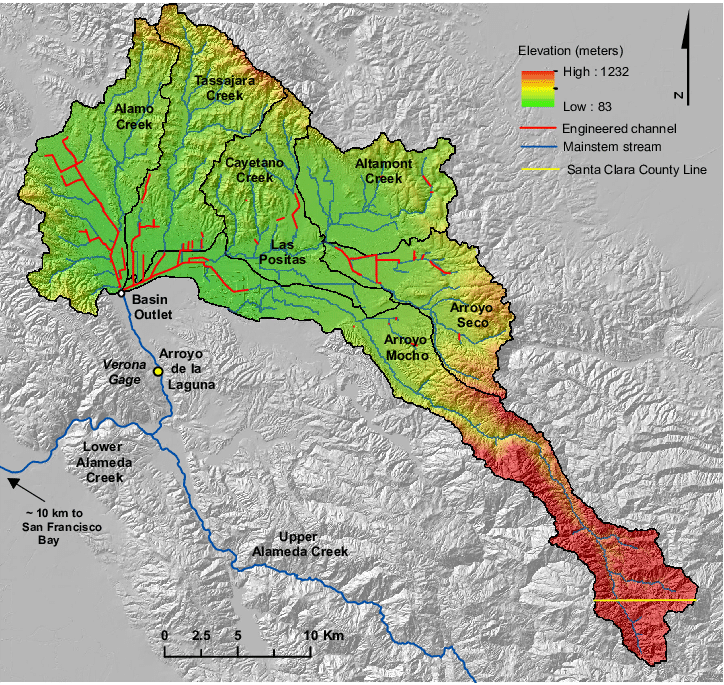
Arroyo Mocho watershed; Livermore is near the right of the green area

== See also ==
- Alameda Creek
- Arroyo de la Laguna
- List of watercourses in the San Francisco Bay Area
