= Tassajara Creek =

Stream in California, United States

Coordinates: 37°41′06″N 121°53′26″W

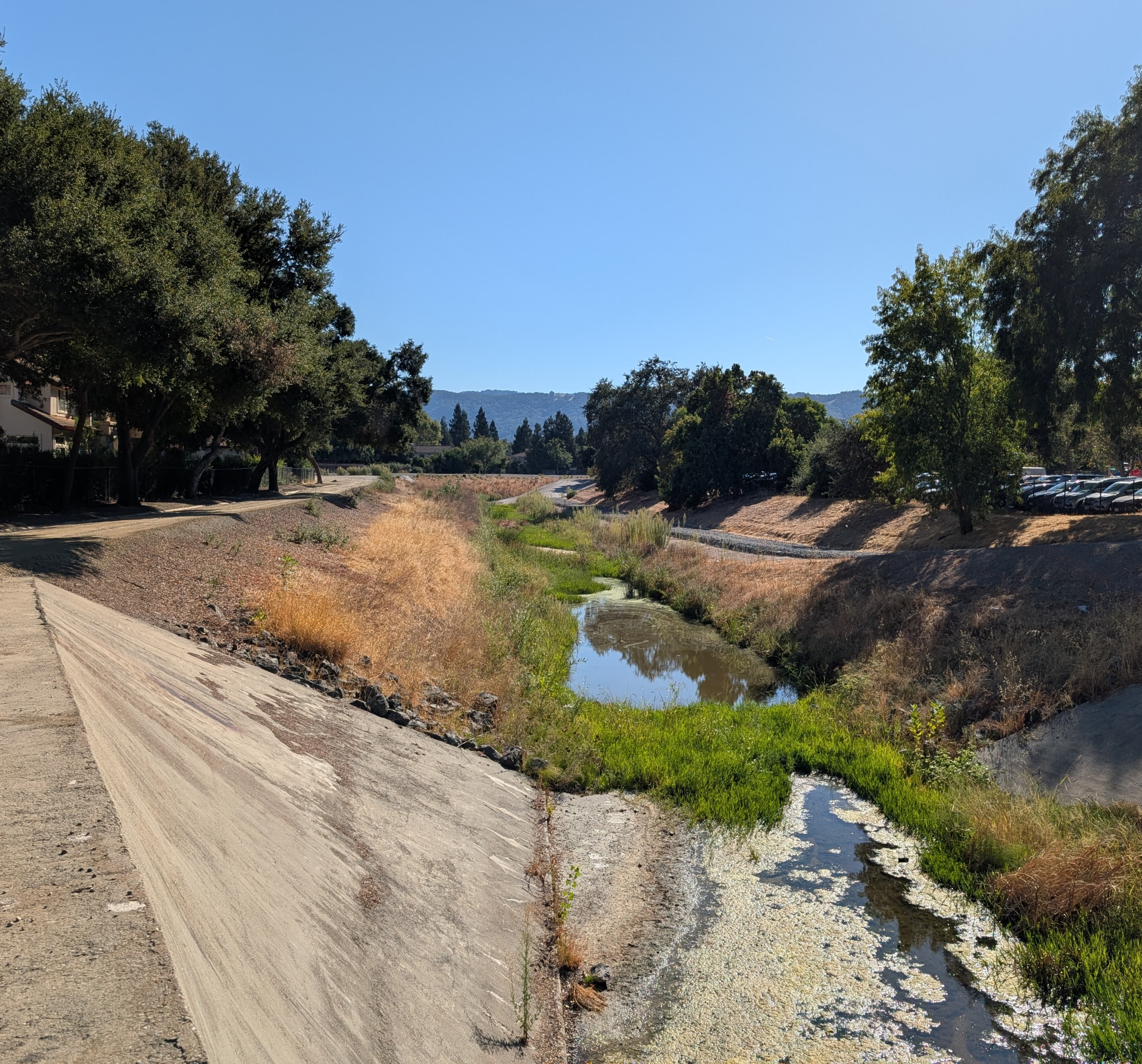
Tassajara Creek as it approaches its confluence with Arroyo de la Laguna, as seen from the bridge at W. Las Positas Blvd, Pleasanton, California

Tassajara Creek is a stream that flows from southeast of Mount Diablo in Contra Costa County to Arroyo de la Laguna in Pleasanton in Alameda County, California.

The small Tassajara Creek Regional Park is along the creek, in Dublin, California, adjacent to the eastern boundary of Camp Parks. There are several trails called Tassajara Creek Trail near the creek, including one near the park, and one on Mount Diablo.

Portions of the stream were restored between a 1996 analysis and a 2006 study that showed that the restoration had halted chronic incision along the creek.
