= South San Ramon Creek =

- Location of the mouth of San Ramon Creek in California

Location
- Country: United States
- State: California
- Region: Alameda County, Contra Costa County
- Cities: Pleasanton, Dublin, San Ramon

Physical characteristics
- Source: Sherburne Hills
  - location: southeast of Danville
  - coordinates: 37°45′56″N 121°57′20″W
- Mouth: Arroyo de la Laguna
  - location: Pleasanton, California
  - coordinates: 37°40′37″N 121°54′44″W
  - elevation: 315 ft (96 m)

South San Ramon Creek is a 9.3-mile-long (15.0 km) southward-flowing stream in Alameda County and southern Contra Costa County, in the East Bay region of northern California.

The creek is a tributary to Arroyo de la Laguna, flowing in the western Livermore Valley through Dublin and Pleasanton.

== Geography ==
South San Ramon Creek drains the land area generally lying above the Bishop Subbasin of the Livermore Valley Groundwater Basin. The Bishop Subbasin comprises 1,666 acres (7 km^{2}) of valley lands in the far northwestern portion of Livermore Valley Ground Water Basin. The Bishop Subbasin lies entirely within Contra Costa County, is drained by, and is a portion of that area locally designated as San Ramon Valley. The subbasin is bounded on the east and west by rolling hills composed of sediments of the Tassajara Formation.

The creek is being actively protected as of 2007, by the city of San Ramon and other entities to preserve riparian zone habitat.

The public Iron Horse Regional Trail runs along a portion of South San Ramon Creek.

== See also ==
- Bishop Subbasin
- List of watercourses in the San Francisco Bay Area
- Tassajara Formation
