= Arroyo Valle =

Arroyo Valle Arroyo De Los Taunamines
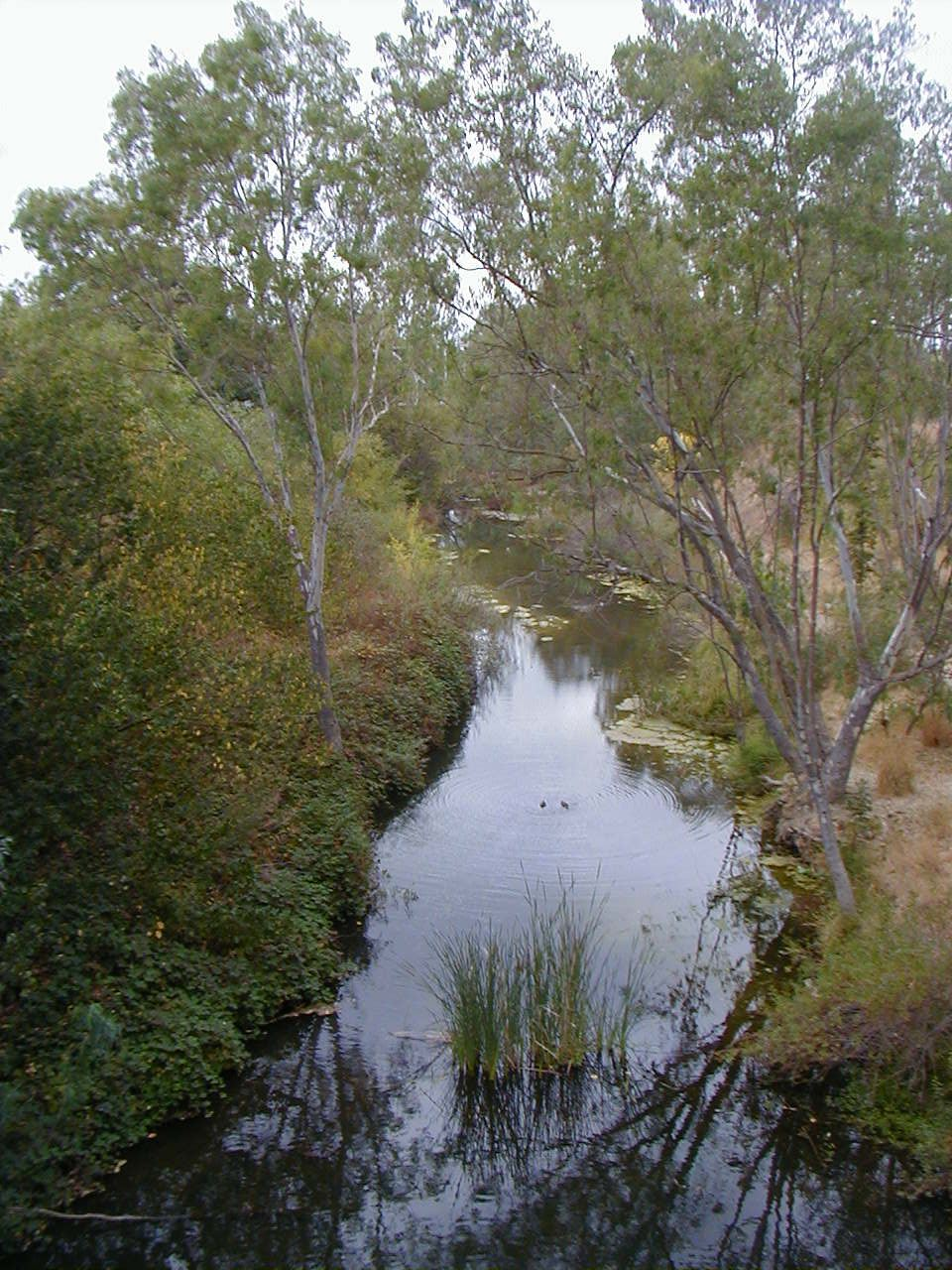
- Arroyo del Valle in Pleasanton, California

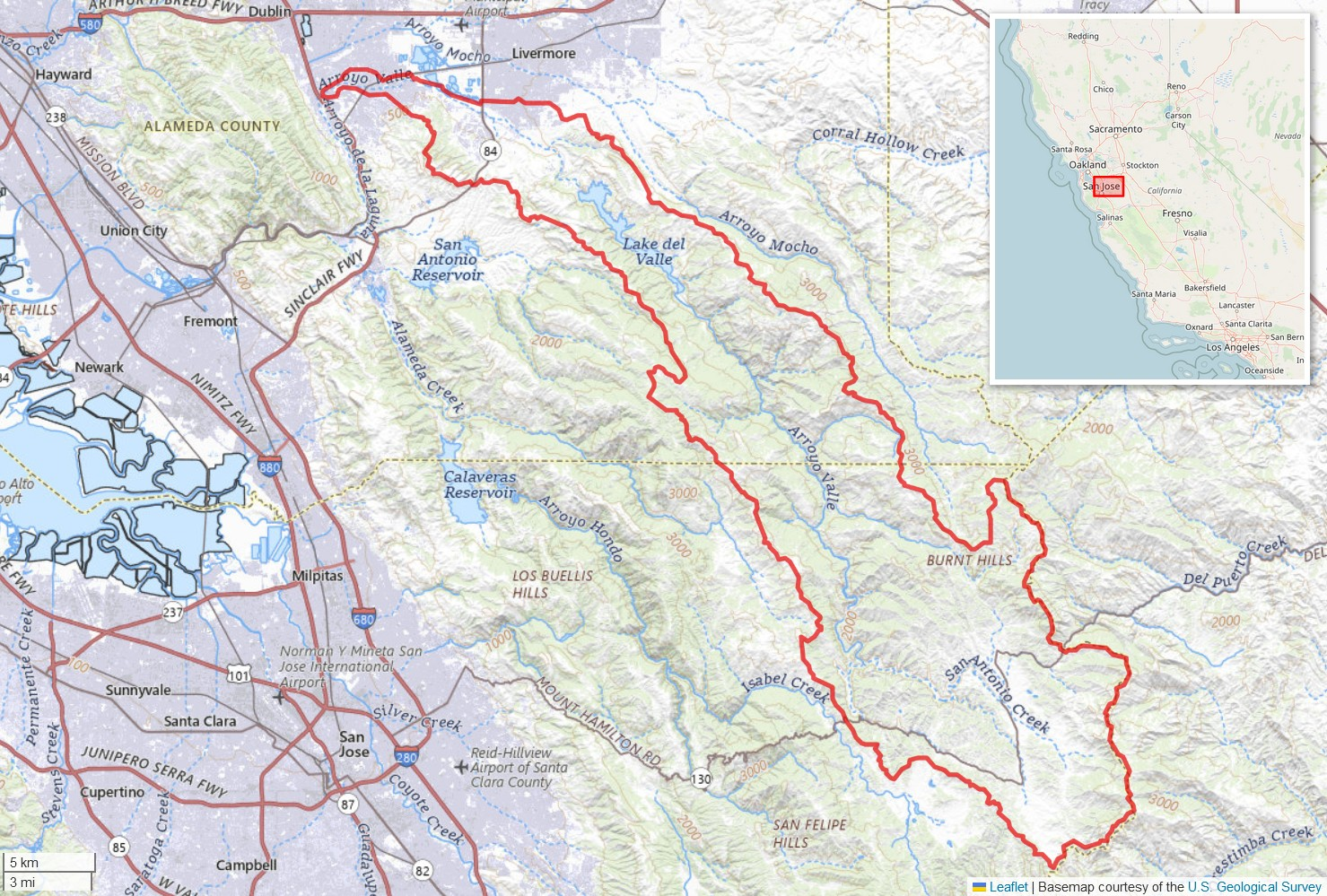
- Arroyo Valle watershed (Interactive map)

Location
- Country: United States
- State: California
- Region: Santa Clara County
- City: Pleasanton, California

Physical characteristics
- Source: Confluence of San Antonio Creek and Arroyo Bayo
  - coordinates: 37°23′08″N 121°34′21″W
  - elevation: 1,808 ft (551 m)
- Mouth: Confluence with Arroyo de la Laguna
  - coordinates: 37°39′43″N 121°54′22″W
  - elevation: 302 ft (92 m)
- Basin size: 430 km^{2} (170 sq mi)

Basin features
- Progression: Arroyo Valle > Arroyo de la Laguna > Alameda Creek > San Francisco Bay > Pacific Ocean
- Tributaries
  - left: Pino Creek, Sycamore Creek (Santa Clara County), Trout Creek (Santa Clara County)
  - right: Spring Canyon Creek, Sulphur Gulch, Colorado Creek, Dry Creek, Eylar Canyon Creek, Lang Canyon Creek

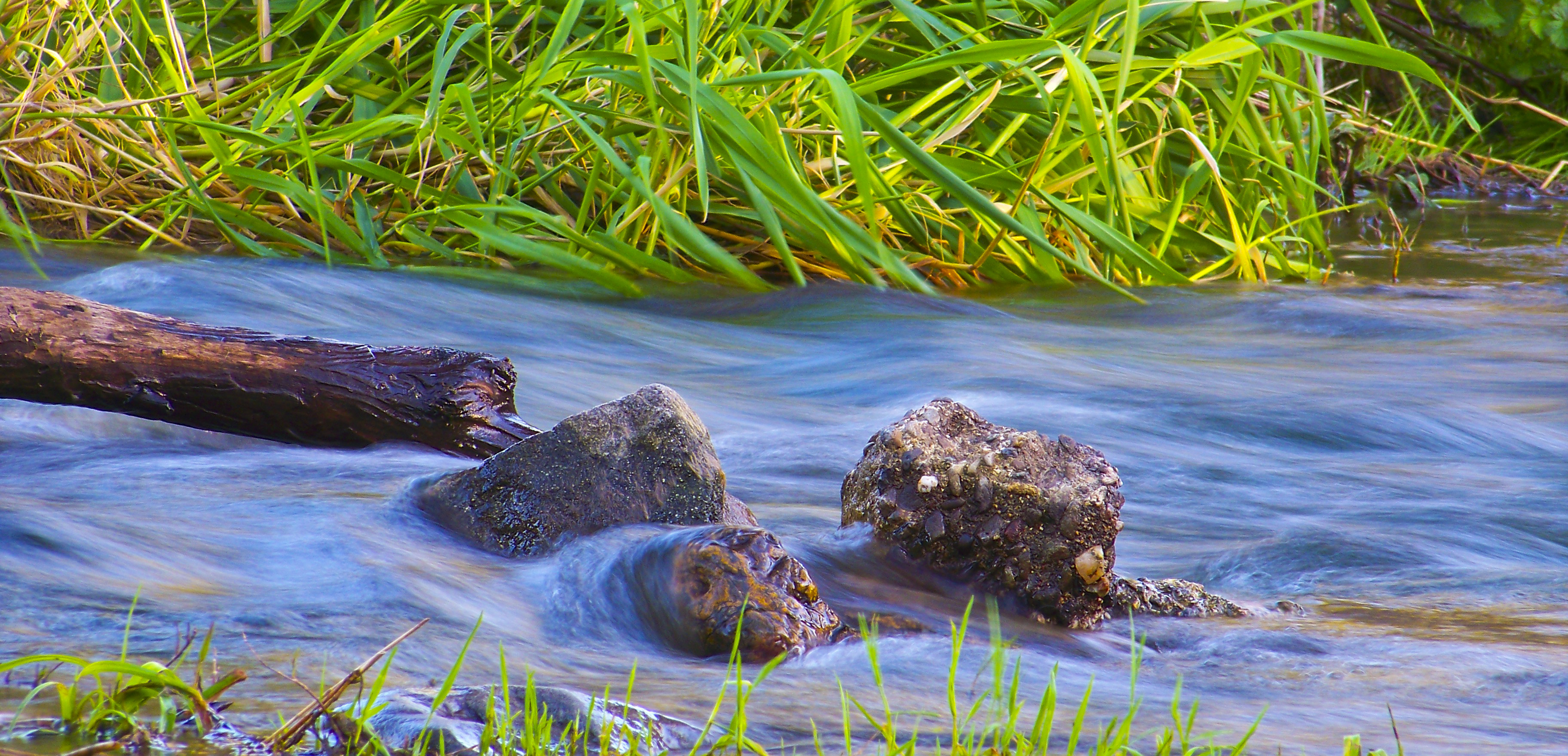
Detail

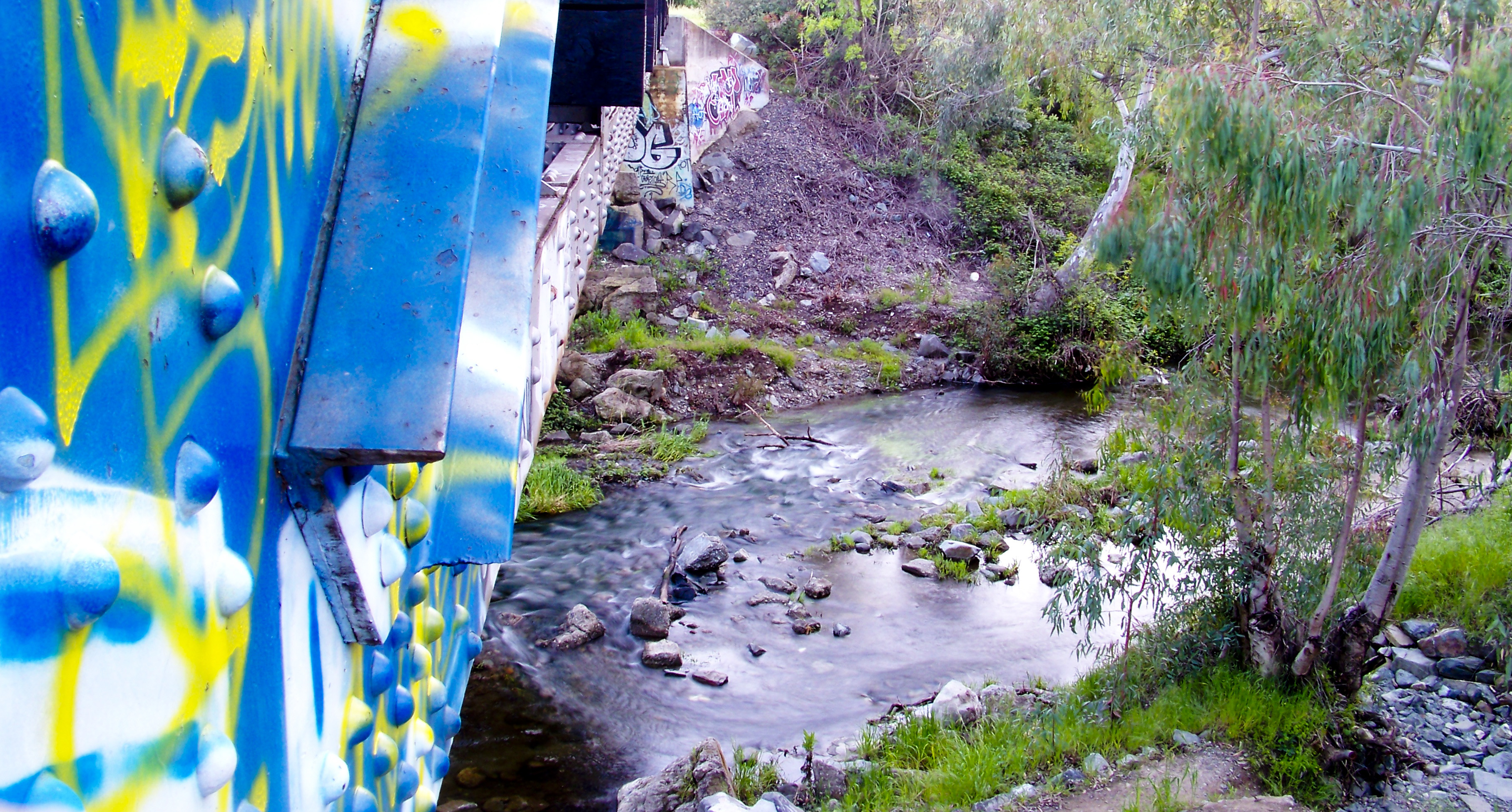
The arroyo in Pleasanton

Arroyo Valle or Arroyo Del Valle is a 36.4-mile-long (58.6 km) westward-flowing stream that begins in northeastern Santa Clara County, California, and flows northwesterly into Alameda County where it is dammed to form Lake Del Valle. After that Arroyo Valle is a tributary to Arroyo de la Laguna which in turn flows into Alameda Creek and thence to San Francisco Bay. In the past, the Arroyo Valle had a significant steelhead migration; however, degradation of the stream in the latter half of the 20th century has decimated this anadromous fish population.

== History ==
Arroyo Valle was also once known as Arroyo De Los Taunamines (Stream of the Taunamines), for the Costanoan Taunamines people who lived there. In 1853 it was renamed Arroyo del Valle (Stream of the Valley).

== Watershed and Course ==
The Arroyo Valle watershed drains 147 square miles (380 km^{2}). The upper reaches of Arroyo Valle stretch into northeastern Santa Clara County where the mainstem is formed by the confluence of San Antonio Creek and Arroyo Bayo. San Antonio Creek's origin is on the western slope of 3,804 feet (1,159 m) Mount Stakes, west of the Santa Clara-Stanislaus County border, about 32 miles (51 km) southeast of Livermore. San Antonio Creek traverses the San Antonio Valley as it heads west to Arroyo Valle. Arroyo Bayo also has its origin on Mount Stakes southwestern slope and traverses Upper San Antonio Valley as it also heads west to Arroyo Valle.

Arroyo Valle is dammed by the Del Valle Dam, which forms the reservoir Lake Del Valle in southeastern Alameda County.

Downstream from the reservoir, Arroyo Valle drains much of the southern portion of the city of Livermore, and it also flows through and drains a considerable fraction of the city of Pleasanton, both in the Livermore Valley. The stream is a tributary to Arroyo de la Laguna, which is in turn tributary to Alameda Creek, which ultimately reaches San Francisco Bay at Fremont, California.

== Ecology ==
Water quality measurements in Arroyo Valle in the Livermore Valley indicate a pH level of 7.0, or neutral with respect to acidity; phosphate levels were not detectable.

In the middle reaches of Arroyo Valle south of Livermore, there has been considerable historic grazing use. Depth to groundwater in this reach of the watershed typically ranges from 50 feet (15 m) to 100 feet (30 m) and flows to the west. Subsequent to this reach, the Arroyo del Valle flows down the moderately sloping hills to enter gravel pits, where extraction (but not processing) has historically been conducted by Lone Star Industries.

Historically, Arroyo Valle was connected to Tulare Lake, a lagoon in the Livermore-Amador Valley, and thus to the Alameda Creek watershed. There are historical records of steelhead trout (Oncorhynchus mykiss) in Arroyo Valle although now the Lake Del Valle Dam is an impassable barrier to spawning runs.

== See also ==
- List of watercourses in the San Francisco Bay Area
- Arroyo de la Laguna
- Alameda Creek
