= Arroyo de la Laguna =

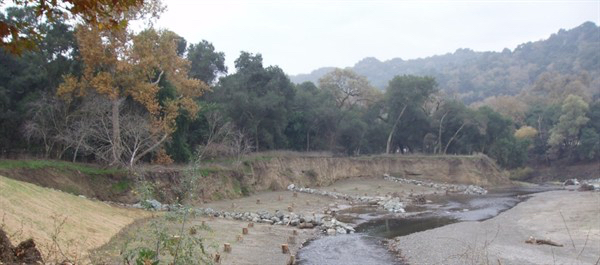
- Alameda County Resource Conservation District restoration project in lower Arroyo de la Laguna will re-establish riparian terraces in eroded channel.

- Location of the mouth of Arroyo de la Laguna in California
- Etymology: Spanish

Location
- Country: United States
- State: California
- Region: Alameda County
- City: Pleasanton

Physical characteristics
- Source: confluence
  - location: Pleasanton
  - coordinates: 37°40′36″N 121°54′44″W
  - elevation: 315 ft (96 m)
- Mouth: Alameda Creek
  - location: south of Sunol, California
  - coordinates: 37°35′18″N 121°53′27″W
  - elevation: 217 ft (66 m)

Basin features
- Tributaries
  - left: Arroyo Valle
  - right: Sinbad Creek

Arroyo de la Laguna is a 7.5-mile-long (12.1 km) southward-flowing stream in Alameda County, California, United States which originates at the confluences of South San Ramon Creek and Arroyo Mocho. The Arroyo de la Laguna is fed by tributaries in the Amador Valley and certain eastern slope drainages of the Diablo Range; these tributaries include Arroyo Valle and Sinbad Creek. Arroyo del la Laguna is the major tributary to Alameda Creek which in turn flows into the San Francisco Bay.

From prehistoric times much of the eastern part of the Amador Valley consisted of a lake known as Tulare Lake. With development of the valley starting in the 19th century, drainage alterations in this watershed reduced the lake to a watercourse now called the Arroyo de la Laguna.

== Hydrogeology ==
In the northern portion of the Arroyo de la Laguna catchment basin, the Tassajara Formation underlies Quaternary valley fill material. Contacts of these two formations are often indistinguishable due to similarities of physical characteristics. The prism of sediments identified as valley fill materials contains from eight to ten separate zones of sand and gravel separated by zones of silt and clay.

Rapid development and other historic changes in the upper watershed have caused severe instability in the lower 5 miles (8.0 km) of the Arroyo de la Laguna.

== See also ==
- List of watercourses in the San Francisco Bay Area
- Mocho Subbasin
- Pleasanton Fault
- Tassajara Formation
