= Livermore Valley =

Valley in Alameda County, California, US

Coordinates: 37°41′19″N 121°44′08″W

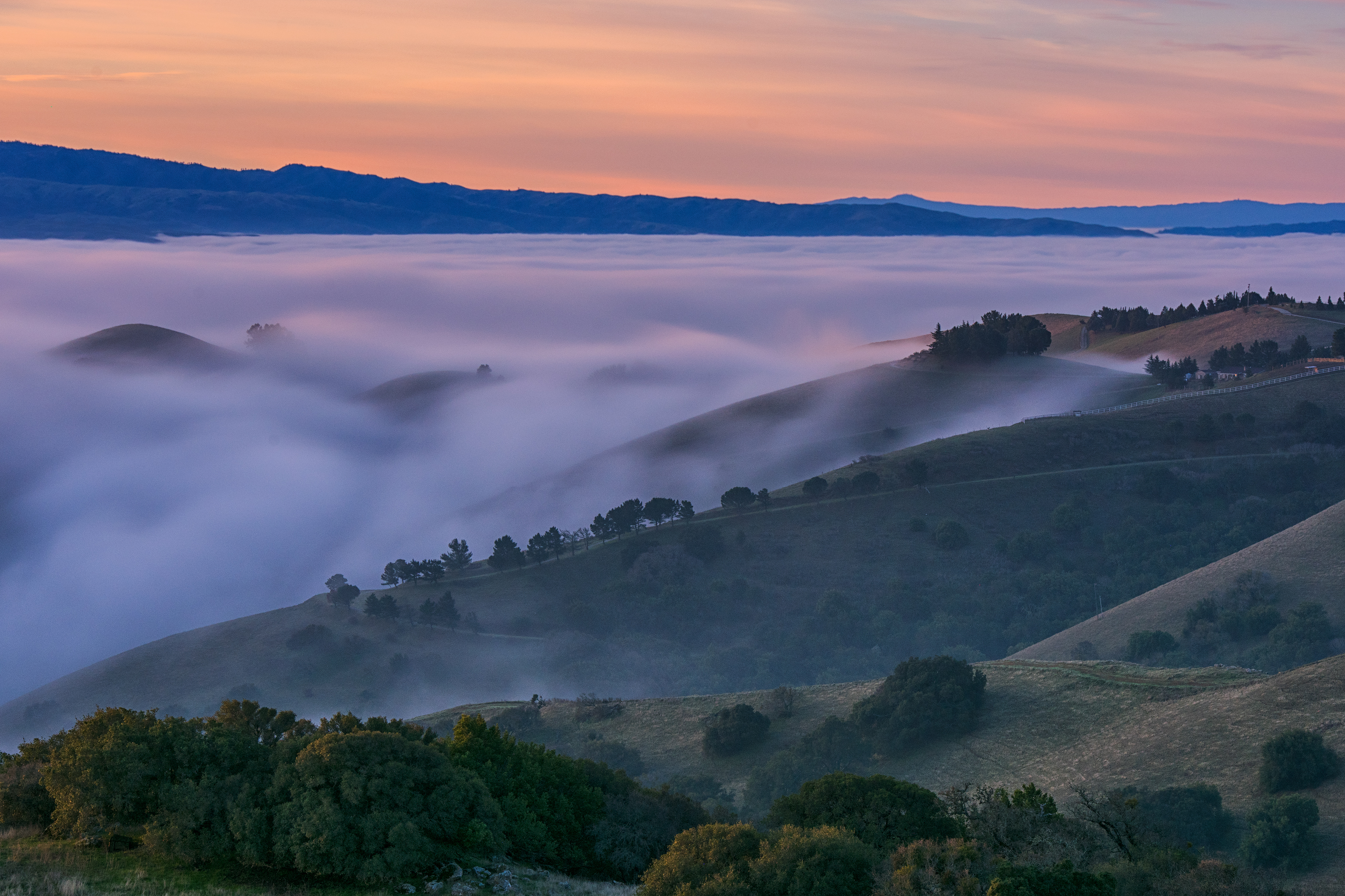
- A sunrise with low fog in the Livermore Valley
- Floor elevation: 136 m (446 ft)

Geography
- Location: California
- Country: United States
- State: California
- District: Alameda County
- Interactive map of Livermore Valley

The Livermore Valley, historically known as the Valle de San José (Valley of San José), is a valley in Alameda County, California, located in the East Bay region. The city of Livermore is located in the valley. The valley became known as "Livermore's Valley", and today as the "Livermore Valley" after Robert Livermore, an early settler and rancher in the region who received together with José Noriega a land grant composing most of modern Livermore.

The groundwater basin underlying the valley is the Livermore Basin, the largest sub-unit of which is the Mocho Subbasin. The Livermore Basin is one of five aquifers in the San Francisco Bay Area that supply most of the metropolitan Bay Area population. The entire Livermore Basin aquifer faces a concern over elevated total dissolved solids by the year 2020 due to an expanding human population leading to higher rates of return water flows to the aquifer containing certain salts.

== Geography and geology ==
The valley is bounded by the Diablo Range on the north, east, and south; and is linked to the west with the Amador Valley.

Watercourses draining the Livermore Valley include Arroyo Mocho, Arroyo Valle, Arroyo Seco, and Arroyo Las Positas.

Geologically, the Livermore Valley is a tectonically formed pull-apart basin, which has been infilled with late Tertiary and Quaternary alluvial sediment.

== History ==
Livermore Valley was named after Robert Livermore, an immigrant American rancher in Mexican Alta California, who with his business partner José Noriega were keeping livestock in the valley since 1834. Livermore and Jose Noriega received the Mexican land grant for Rancho Las Positas, which encompassed the valley, in 1839 from Governor Juan Bautista Alvarado.

In 1847 Noriega and Livermore purchased Rancho Canada de los Vaqueros adjacent to the north of Rancho Las Positas and Livermore Valley in the Diablo Range.

Livermore's name became well known during the California Gold Rush in the late 1840s−early 1850s, for an inn at his adobe ranch house in the valley that served miners and other travelers eastbound on the road from the Bay Area through the Diablo Range's passes to the Mother Lode region in the Sierra Nevada.

The valley came to be called by his name, as was Livermore Pass then (present day Altamont Pass), the valley's northern pass that led to Stockton and the gold fields.

== See also ==
- Hagemann Ranch Historic District
- Livermore Valley AVA
