= Tamcan =

Tamcan or Tammukan was a local tribe of Delta Yokuts-speaking natives in the U.S. that once lived on the lower reaches of California's San Joaquin River in what is now eastern Contra Costa County and western San Joaquin County, California. The Tamcans were absorbed into the system of the Spanish missions in California in the early nineteenth century; they moved to Mission San José, near the shore of San Francisco Bay, between 1806 and 1811. At the mission, they and their descendants intermarried with speakers of the San Francisco Bay Ohlone, Plains Miwok, and Patwin Indian languages. Mission Indian survivors of these mixed groups gathered at Alisal, near Pleasanton in Contra Costa County, in the late nineteenth century.

It has been stated that Tammukan was a specific place, a lost city even. It is not known how that idea came about. However, Father Narciso Duran did use specific place markers for "Tamcan" and other "rancherias [communities]" along the San Joaquin River on his 1824 map of the native communities east of Mission San Jose.

== Location ==
The Tamcan territory along the Old River of the lower San Joaquin River was probably no more than 12 miles in circumference. The names and locations of their specific villages were never documented. Bennyhoff was the first anthropologist to infer their location. He concluded that their main village was on the west bank of the San Joaquin River, east of Tracy and west of Lathrop in current San Joaquin County. Milliken, using marriage pattern data from the Mission San Jose ecclesiastical records and clues from Father Duran's 1824 Plano Topográfico of communities east of Mission San Jose, concluded that the Tamcan lived north of the modern town of Tracy, in the vicinity of the modern town of Byron, and on Union Island just to its east.

== Language ==
The Tamcan spoke the Delta Yokuts language. The first Delta Yokuts vocabulary was recorded at Pleasanton, California by Alphonse Pinart in 1880. Pinart called the language "Tcholovones, or better Colovomnes" and wrote that it was a variant on the "Tulareños" languages spoken on the San Joaquin River and at Tulare Lake (now known to be the Yokuts language family). Pinart learned that the dialect was spoken not only by the "Colovomne", but also by the "Jachikamne, beside the town of Stockton, Pasasamne, Nututamne, Tammukamne, Helutamne, Taniamne, Sanaiamne, Xosmitamne." John Wesley Powell, in his 1891 synthesis Indian Linguistic Families of America North of Mexico, did not mention the Tammukan, but did include within the Mariposan language family a northern "Cholovon division" in "a small strip of territory on the eastern bank of the San Joaquin."

A. L. Kroeber called the native language of the San Joaquin Valley "Yokuts," a modification of terms used by Powers and Gatchet, rather than follow Powell's use of "Mariposan" for the language family. In 1908 he cited the Pinart "Tcholovones" manuscript as evidence that a Yokuts language had been spoken in the San Joaquin River Delta prior to Spanish mission outreach in that area. "M. Pinart in this paper gives a vocabulary which is pure Yokuts," wrote Kroeber, who also repeated Pinart's list of the local groups, including "Tammukamne," as Pinart had spelled them. Two years later Hodge briefly mentioned "Tammukamne" in his compendium on American Indians.

The unique nature of the far northern Yokuts language spoken by Pinart's "Colovomnes" and "Tammukamnes" was first delineated in 1959. Recently Golla, who has introduced the term "Delta Yokuts" for the language, wrote that Ken Whistler "has proposed that the vocabulary distinctive of some of the Delta Yokuts dialects may reflect substratal influence from pre-proto-Yokuts or from an extinct Yok-Utian language." Norval Smith has recently analyzed a small previously unpublished "Tamukan" word list that supports the conclusion that the Tamcan people spoke the Delta Yokuts language.

== History ==
Tamcan individuals first appeared in the baptismal register of Mission San José in 1806. They were baptized there in mixed groups with their immediate neighbors, whose name was written "Cholvon" at that mission, through the year 1811. Occasional Tamcan individuals, intermarried with more distant groups, continued to be baptized at Mission San Jose until 1824. By that year 138 of them had been baptized.

== Notable Tamcan descendants ==
José Guzman, a notable early twentieth-century consultant to linguist J. P. Harrington, was partially Tamcan by descent.

== See also ==
- Indigenous peoples of California
- Population of Native California
- California mission clash of cultures
