= Pleasanton Public Library =

Municipal library in Alameda County, California, US

Coordinates: 37°39′27″N 121°52′51″W

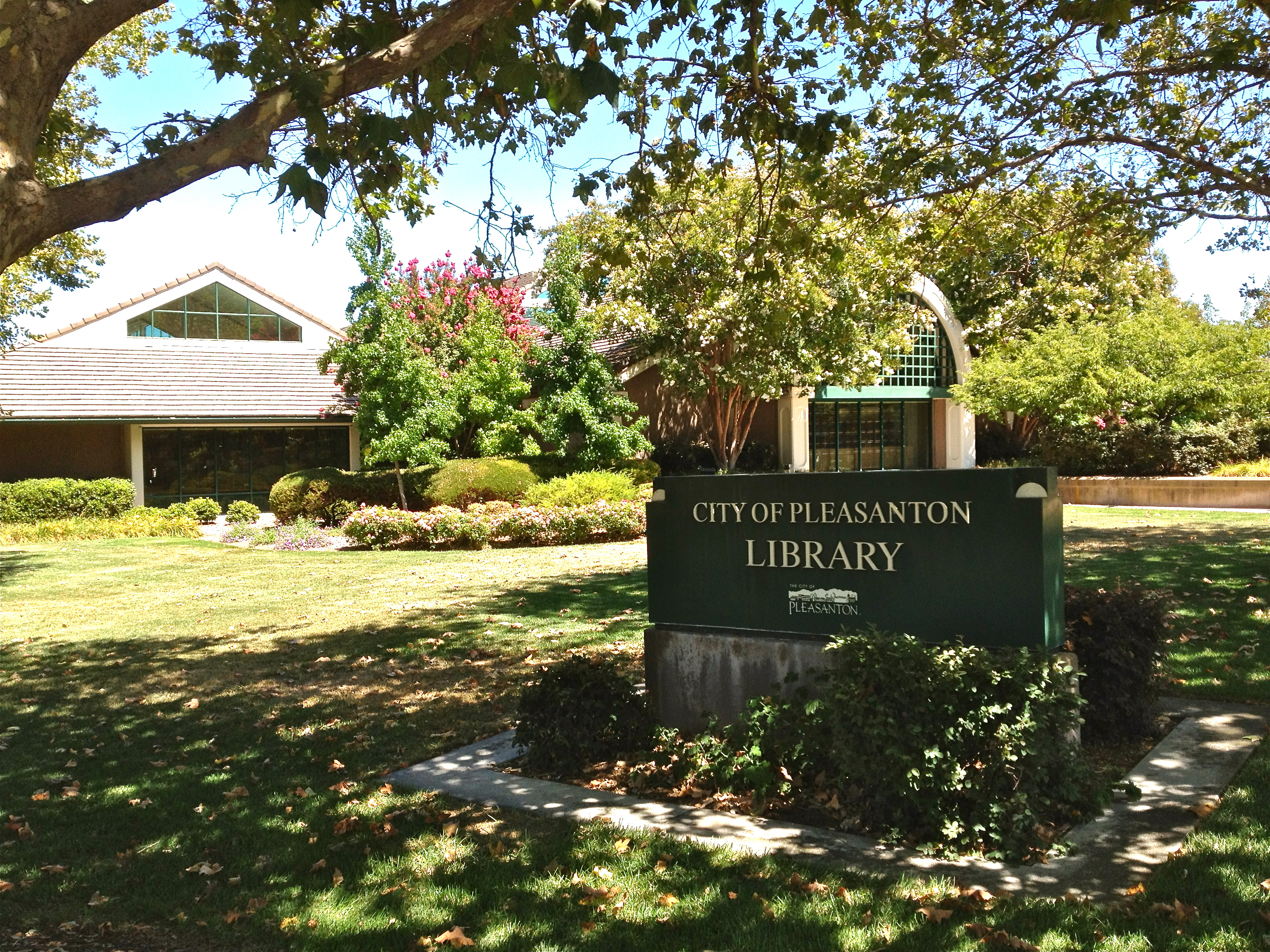
Pleasanton Public Library

The Pleasanton Public Library serves the city of Pleasanton in Alameda County, California. The library is located near downtown Pleasanton at 400 Old Bernal Avenue.

The Pleasanton Women's Improvement Club was formed in 1908 to improve the community of Pleasanton, an agricultural town located in the "Tri-Valley" area east of San Francisco. Their first project was to establish a reading room. With $1,100 they raised at an "Old Maid's Convention" and other fundraisers, they purchased a site to house the Reading Room. In 1909, it was opened to the public. Books were donated and a librarian was hired for $10 per month. Honored guests for the formal opening were Mrs. Phoebe Apperson Hearst and her guest, the Consul of Persia. After Pleasanton's first city hall (now the Museum on Main Street) was built in 1915, the city leased a portion of it to the club for $1 per year to house the library and reading room.

The library has grown to keep pace with Pleasanton as it changed from an agricultural town to a suburban residential community and one of the modern business centers of the East Bay area. In 1964, the library became a full member of the Alameda County Library system. In 1973, the need for growth led the library to a new 6,900-square-foot (640 m^{2}) facility on Black Avenue, with approximately 35,000 books. In 1987, the city recognized the need for an even larger library and began construction on the current 30,000-square-foot (2,800 m^{2}) facility, which opened in 1988.

In 1999, in response to significant funding losses to the Alameda County Library system generated by California's "Educational Revenue Augmentation Fund", the City of Pleasanton withdrew from the system to become a municipal library. Since that time, use of the library has more than doubled, with more than 1.1 million items checked out in calendar year 2005.

== Management ==
The Pleasanton Library Commission gather every first Thursday of the month at 7:00pm and advises the Pleasanton City Council and the Pleasanton City Manager by reviewing and providing input on policies related to library services. The director of the City of Pleasanton Library and Recreation Department is Heidi Murphy.
