= Alisal, Pleasanton, California =

Alisal, or El Alisal (The Sycamores), was a Californio settlement located on the lands of the Rancho Santa Rita near the site of an Indian ranchera, around the Francisco Solano Alviso Adobe, called El Alisal (The Sycamores), one of the earliest houses built in the Livermore Valley in 1844. Note that even though the database and plaque use the word "sycamore", the English translation of the Spanish "aliso" is "alder".

Alisal, nicknamed "The Most Desperate Town in the West", was one of the settlements located along the trail called La Vereda del Monte that was a haunt and refuge of bandits and desperados in the era following the beginning of the California Gold Rush. Main Street shootouts were not uncommon. Banditos such as Claudio Feliz and Joaquin Murrieta would ambush prospectors on their way back from the gold fields and then seek refuge in Alisal. In the 1860s and 1870s Procopio, Narciso Bojorques and others took refuge there.

During the period of the railroad boom in the late 1860s, Rancho Santa Rita was sub divided. In 1869 J.W. Kottinger and J.A. Neal each laid out and plotted a subdivision for a new town called Alisal, situated about five miles south of Dublin. By 1878 the village was an unincorporated town of about 500 people.

Alisal was later included within Pleasanton, California that was founded in 1894.
