= Peter Gassner =

American entrepreneur and businessman (born 1965)

Peter P. Gassner
- Born: February 26, 1965 (age 61)
- Education: Oregon State University, 1989
- Occupation: Businessman
- Known for: Co-founder of Veeva
- Title: CEO of Veeva

Peter P. Gassner (born February 26, 1965) is the CEO and co-founder of Veeva, a company supporting processes in the pharmaceutical industry. With a net worth of US $5.25 billion, he is ranked 494th by Bloomberg on the list of billionaires worldwide. He is a member of the board of directors of Zoom Video Communications.

== Early life ==
Gassner grew up in Portland, Oregon, the son of Swiss immigrants. His father owned a machine shop. Peter is the third of six children. When he was 8 years old, he worked as a paperboy. He later worked mowing lawns, in a restaurant, and then, in high school, he had a roofing business. In high school, he was also captain of the wrestling team. A math teacher recommended that he take a computer science class, which influenced his career.

Gassner kept starting and stopping college, taking extended breaks in Hawaii, Australia, and Thailand, where he worked as a trekking guide. He earned a degree in computer science from Oregon State University in 1989.

== Career ==
Gassner worked on DB2 for IBM's Silicon Valley Lab. He also worked for IBM Research at the Almaden Research Center.

Beginning at the age of 30, he worked for PeopleSoft for 9 years as both Chief Architect and General Manager of PeopleTools.

He then worked for Salesforce.com as Senior Vice President of Technology.

After 4 years of working at Salesforce, he saw an opportunity to offer software focused on life sciences built on Salesforce's platform.

In 2007, along with Matt Wallach, Doug Ostler, and Mitch Wallace, he launched Veeva Systems, a software firm that serves life sciences companies.

== Personal life ==
Gassner is married and has 2 sons. He lives in Pleasanton, California. He speaks Thai language.
