= Rancho Santa Rita =

Mexican land grant in California

Coordinates: 37.670°N 121.870°W

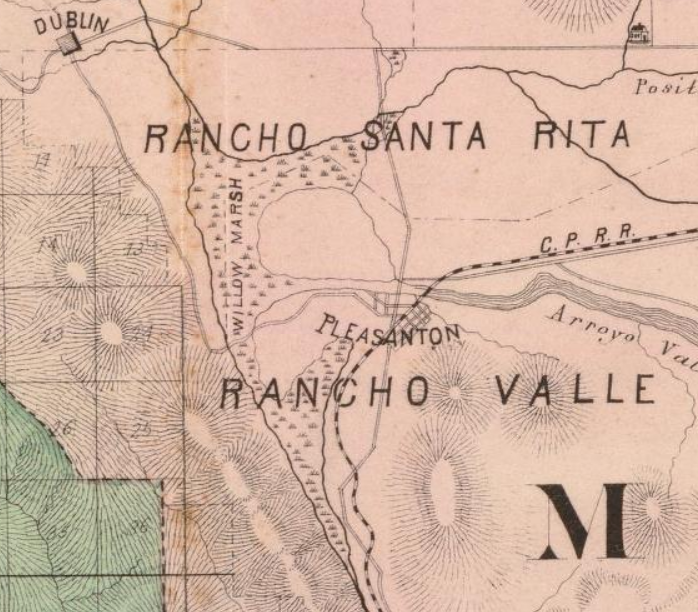
1878 map

Rancho Santa Rita was a 8,894-acre (14 sq mi) Mexican land grant in the Amador Valley and western Livermore Valley, which is in present-day Alameda County, California. It was given in 1839 by Governor Juan Alvarado to Jose Dolores Pacheco. The rancho included present-day Pleasanton, Asco, and Dougherty.

== History ==
Rancho Santa Rita was initially used by Mission San José as part of the mission's Rancho El Valle de San Jose, an area now known as Amador Valley. In 1834 Pueblo de San José alcalde Jose Dolores Pacheco applied for two leagues of land in the northeast portion of this mission rancho. Fr. José González Rubio objected that this application conflicted with the mission's on-going use of that land for the winter pasturing of cattle. Review of the application was suspended. Pacheco re-applied for the land in 1837 and was made owner in 1839. Its original extended east from Rancho San Ramon, south to a known group of dead trees ("Palos Secos"), then northeast to the mouth of Tassajara Creek and a high hill ("Loma Alta"). This last point was indefinite as three local hills were known by this name during the Mexican era.

Pacheco was an absentee landowner, but had a small adobe built in 1844, built near Tassajara Creek, but no longer standing. In 1854, Francisco Alviso, the son of Pacheco's majordomo (ranch manager), Francisco Solano Alviso, built the adobe ranch house that still stands on Foothill Road in the Alviso Adobe Community Park overlooking Amador Valley.

Pacheco petitioned the Commission for Ascertaining and Settling Private Land Claims in California for a U.S. patent of the land in 1852 but was rejected. The decision was overturned by the District Court in 1855, a decision upheld by the U.S. Supreme Court in 1857. For several years, a legal battle ensued between the owners of this rancho and of Rancho Valle de San Jose to the east regarding their common boundary line. This dispute was settled in 1863 and the land was patented to John Yountz, administrator of the estate of José Dolores Pacheco in 1865.

In 1853, Rancho Santa Rita was sold to Augustin Alviso, grantee of Rancho Potrero de los Cerritos, by the heirs of Jose Delores Pacheco, Juana Pacheco and Salvio Pacheco. In 1854, Samuel B. Martin and West J. Martin purchased Rancho Santa Rita. They sold the ranch in 1865, and moved to Oakland.

In 1865 William M. Mendenhall came to the valley, and in 1868 purchased 650 acres (1.0 sq mi) of the Rancho Santa Rita grant. During the period of the railroad boom in the late 1860s, Rancho Santa Rita was subdivided into fifteen farms. The farms were "small" parcels of about 300 to 3,750 acres (0.5–5.9 sq mi). The larger land owners consisted of J.W. Dougherty, 750 acres (1.2 sq mi); Abdijah Baker, 2,078 acres (3.2 sq mi); and William Knox, 360 acres (0.6 sq mi).

In 1869 J.W. Kottinger and J.A. Neal each laid out and plotted a subdivision for a new town called Alisal, situated about five miles south of Dublin. By 1878 the village was an unincorporated town of about 500 people, later renamed Pleasanton. Like Livermore, Pleasanton attained its size and importance with coming of the Union Pacific Railroad.

In the early 1880s, Count Valensin purchased 140 acres (0.2 sq mi), Maas Suders purchased a strip of land from the Mendenhall's 650 acres (1.0 sq mi), and Samuel Hewlett purchased 1,600 acres (2.5 sq mi). In 1894 the remainder of Rancho Santa Rita was offered for sale by Lagrance and Company of Oakland.

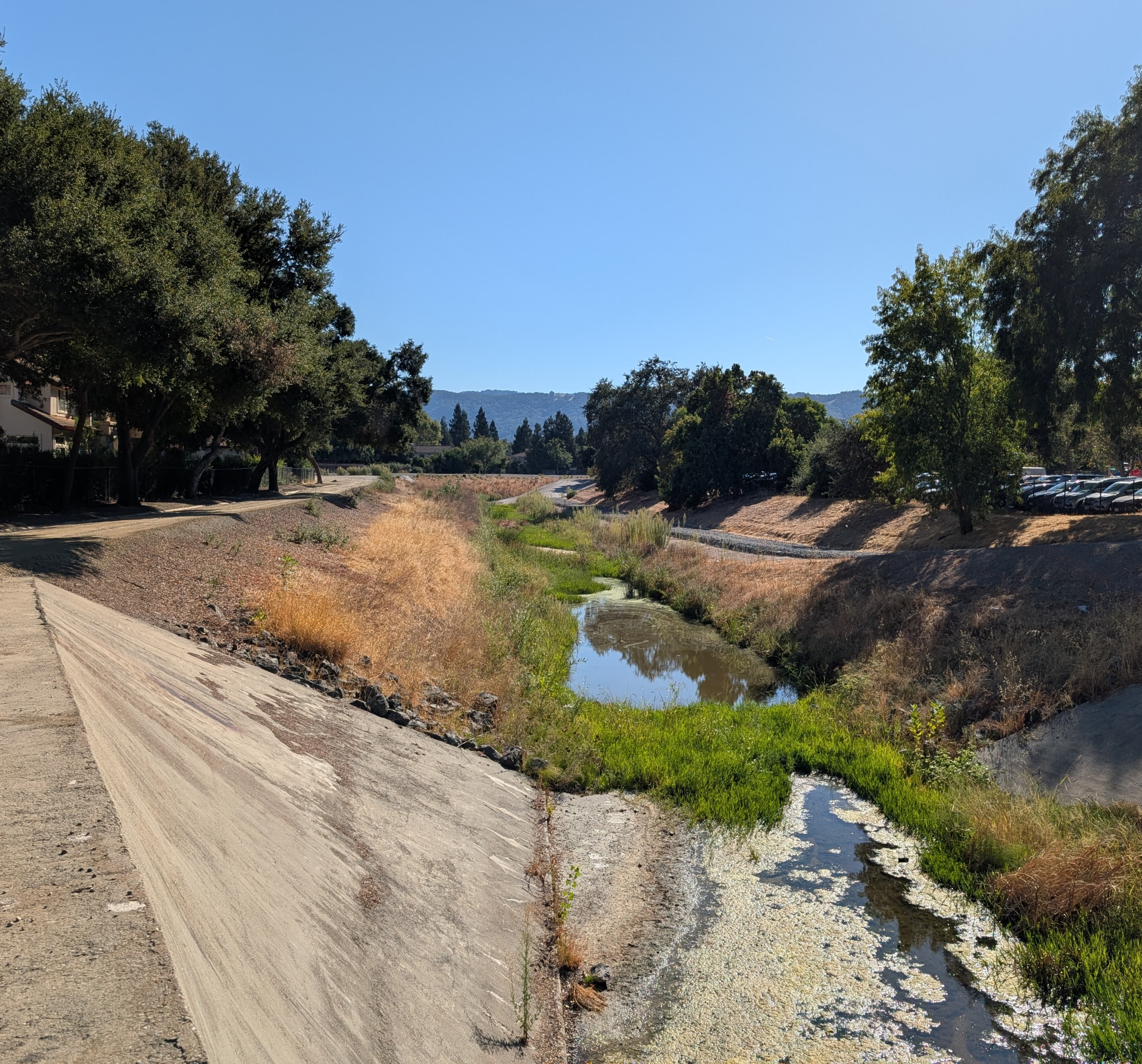
Tassajara Creek as it approaches its confluence with Arroyo de la Laguna, as seen from the bridge at W. Las Positas Blvd, Pleasanton, California

Around 1888, canals were dug to drain Willow Marsh. This northern area of Pleasanton was then used as farmland to grow hops, until the water table was lowered by the Spring Valley Water Company pumping wells in adjoining lands, making the farm's artesian wells go dry. The area is now urbanized, and drains to Tassajara Creek and Arroyo de la Laguna, with Hopyard Road commemorating a bit of this history.

In 1921 what was left of the Mexican grant was sold to Asa Mendenhall.

== Historic sites of the rancho ==
- Pacheco Adobe – the first adobe, built in 1844 by José Dolores Pacheco, is no longer standing. Its site is 0.5 miles (0.8 km) to the north of the Alviso Adobe.
- Francisco Alviso Adobe – built in 1854 by Francisco Alviso, the son of Pacheco's mayordomo (ranch manager), Francisco Solano Alviso. It is located within Alviso Adobe Community Park present day Pleasanton.
- Alviso Adobe Community Park
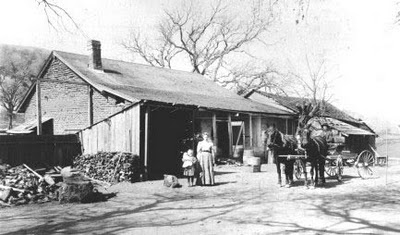
Kroeger family at the Alviso Adobe (circa 1900)

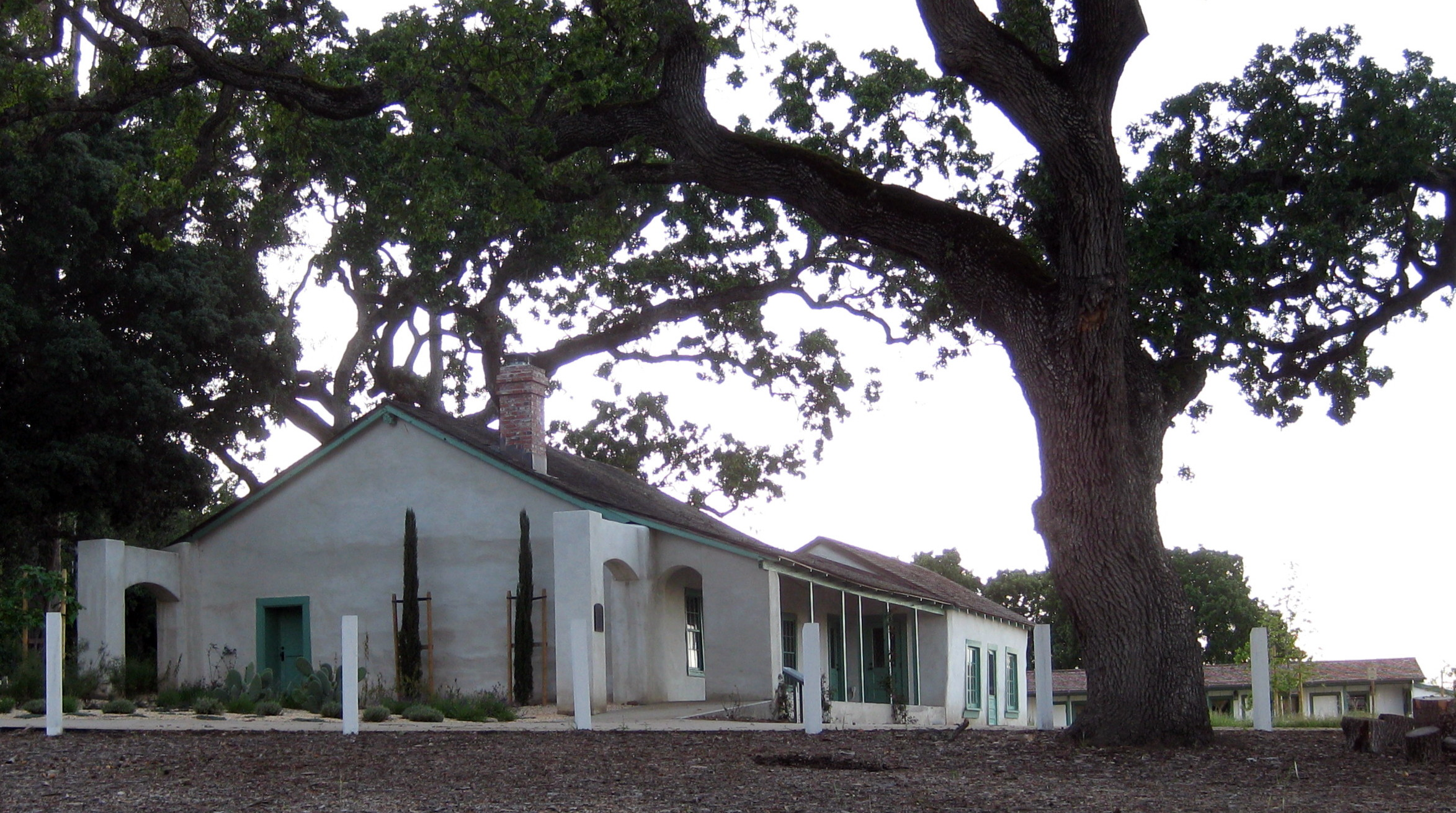
Restored Alviso Adobe in Alviso Adobe Community Park, with a large old Valley oak (Quercus lobata) tree

== See also ==
- Ranchos of Alameda County, California
- List of California Ranchos
