= Veeva Systems =

U.S. provider of software for the life sciences industry

Veeva Systems Inc.
- Type: Public benefit corporation
- Traded as: NYSE: VEEV (Class A); S&P 500 component
- Industry: Software for life sciences
- Founded: 2007; 19 years ago
- Founders: Peter Gassner; Matt Wallach
- Headquarters: Pleasanton, California, U.S.
- Key people: Peter Gassner (CEO); Brent Bowman (CFO); Pinal Patel (CIO); Tom Schwenger (COO)
- Products: Software
- Services: Business consulting
- Revenue: ▲US$3.195 billion (FY 2026)
- Operating income: ▲US$916 million (FY 2026)
- Net income: ▲US$908 million (FY 2026)
- Total assets: ▲US$8.979 billion (FY 2026)
- Total equity: ▲US$7.214 billion (FY 2026)
- Number of employees: 7,928 (2026)
- Website: veeva.com

Veeva Systems Inc., headquartered in Pleasanton, California, provides cloud computing software, data, and consulting services for the life sciences industry. Its products are used to track all aspects of drug development and pharmaceutical manufacturing.

The company has 1,552 customers including Bayer, Boehringer Ingelheim, Eli Lilly and Company, Gilead Sciences, Merck & Co., Novartis, Alkermes plc, Alnylam Pharmaceuticals, bluebird bio, and Idorsia.

== History ==
Veeva was founded in 2007 by Peter Gassner and Matt Wallach.

In 2011, the company introduced Veeva Vault, a content management system for the life sciences industry.

In October 2013, Veeva became a public company via an initial public offering on the New York Stock Exchange.

In February 2021, Veeva became the first publicly traded company to convert to a public benefit corporation.

In 2025, Veeva ended its partnership with Salesforce, a competitor.

=== Acquisitions ===
#	Date	Company	Notes	Ref.
1	October 2015	Zinc Ahead	Content management software company	
2	October 2019	Crossix	Medical privacy-safe patient data and analytics company	
3	November 2019	Physicians World	Provider of business process outsourcing services	
4	August 2021	Learnaboutgmp	Compliance training services for life sciences organizations	
5	December 2021	Veracity Logic	Provider of cloud software for randomization and trial supply management	
6	March 2026	Ostro	Patient and HCP engagement with AI agents for life sciences; price was $100 million	
7	June 2026	Copli	Agentic MLR reviews	
