= Delta Yokuts =

Extinct Valley Yokuts dialect group

- Far Northern Valley Yokuts
- Native to: United States
- Region: California
- Era: until 20th century
- Language family: Yok-Utian: Yokutsan; General Yokuts; Nim; Northern Yokuts; Valley Yokuts?; Delta Yokuts

Language codes
- ISO 639-3: –
- Glottolog: delt1254

Delta Yokuts, also termed Far Northern Valley Yokuts, is an extinct and poorly documented dialect network of the Yokuts language, an indigenous language of central California. It is unclear whether Delta Yokuts is better classed as a subset of Valley Yokuts or Northern Yokuts.

== Geographic distribution ==
Delta Yokuts dialects were spoken along the San Joaquin River from around modern Stockton in the north to the confluence of the Merced and San Joaquin rivers near modern Hills Ferry. Delta Yokuts dialects can be divided into two geographic clusters: northwestern dialects that were spoken around modern Stockton and Tracy, and southeastern dialects that were spoken along the eastern bank of the San Joaquin River up to the Merced.

Attested and named dialects of Delta Yokuts include the northwestern dialects of Yachikumne (Chulamni), Tamukamne (also known as Tamcan), and Cholovomne, and the southeastern dialects of Pasasamne, Lakisamne, Atsnil, Coconoon.

== Linguistic features ==
There is little information available on the linguistic structure of Delta Yokuts, with the extant data consisting only of word lists collected between 1819 and 1909. The vocabulary data was mostly collected in missions, rancherías, or the other places that Delta Yokuts people had been displaced to in the wake of Spanish and American colonization of California.

Delta Yokuts includes borrowings from the neighboring Miwok languages and Costaoan languages, and forms unique to the Delta dialects. For instance, the numerals 1 to 10 include forms shared with other Yokuts languages (1-3), forms unique to Delta Yokuts (4,5), and forms borrowed from Miwok or Costaoan (6-10 in northwestern Delta Yokuts).

Like most other Yokuts languages, Delta Yokuts dialects have five vowels, all with a short/long length distinction. The consonant inventory in Delta Yokuts is extensive, with more than 30 distinct phonemes. The morphology of Yokuts is primarily handled through suffixes, but the suffixation process involves complex phonological processes.
