= Rancho Potrero de los Cerritos =

Mexican land grant in California

Coordinates: 37.570°N 122.060°W

Rancho Potrero de los Cerritos was a 10,610-acre (42.9 km^{2}) Mexican land grant in present day Alameda County, California given in 1844 by Governor Manuel Micheltorena to Augustin Alviso and Tomás Pacheco. The name means "pasture of the little hills" and included the Coyote Hills. The three square league grant, part of former Mission San José lands, encompassed present day Alvarado.

== History ==
Augustin Alviso (1809–1880), son of Josè Ygnacio Alviso, married Maria Josefa Antonia Pacheco (1812–1870) in 1830. Maria Pacheco was the daughter of Bartolome Pacheco, grantee of Rancho San Ramon. Her sister, Maria Antonia de Jesus Pacheco (1796–1852) married in 1816 Augustin Alviso's brother, Josef Antonio Alviso (1796–1880). Augustin Alviso was mayor domo of Mission San José in 1840. In 1853, Augustin Alviso bought Rancho Santa Rita. Tomás Pacheco was a soldier of the San Francisco Company from 1826 to 1832, and later held various offices in the Pueblo of San José from 1834 to 1843.

With the cession of California to the United States following the Mexican-American War, the 1848 Treaty of Guadalupe Hidalgo provided that the land grants would be honored. As required by the Land Act of 1851, a claim for Rancho Potrero de los Cerritos was filed with the Public Land Commission in 1852, and the grant was patented to Tomás Pacheco and Agustín Alviso in 1886.

After the California Gold Rush, the rancho lands were sold to American ranchers, such as George Patterson, John M. Horner, and Henry C. Smith (who laid out the town of New Haven).
