= Alviso Adobe Community Park =

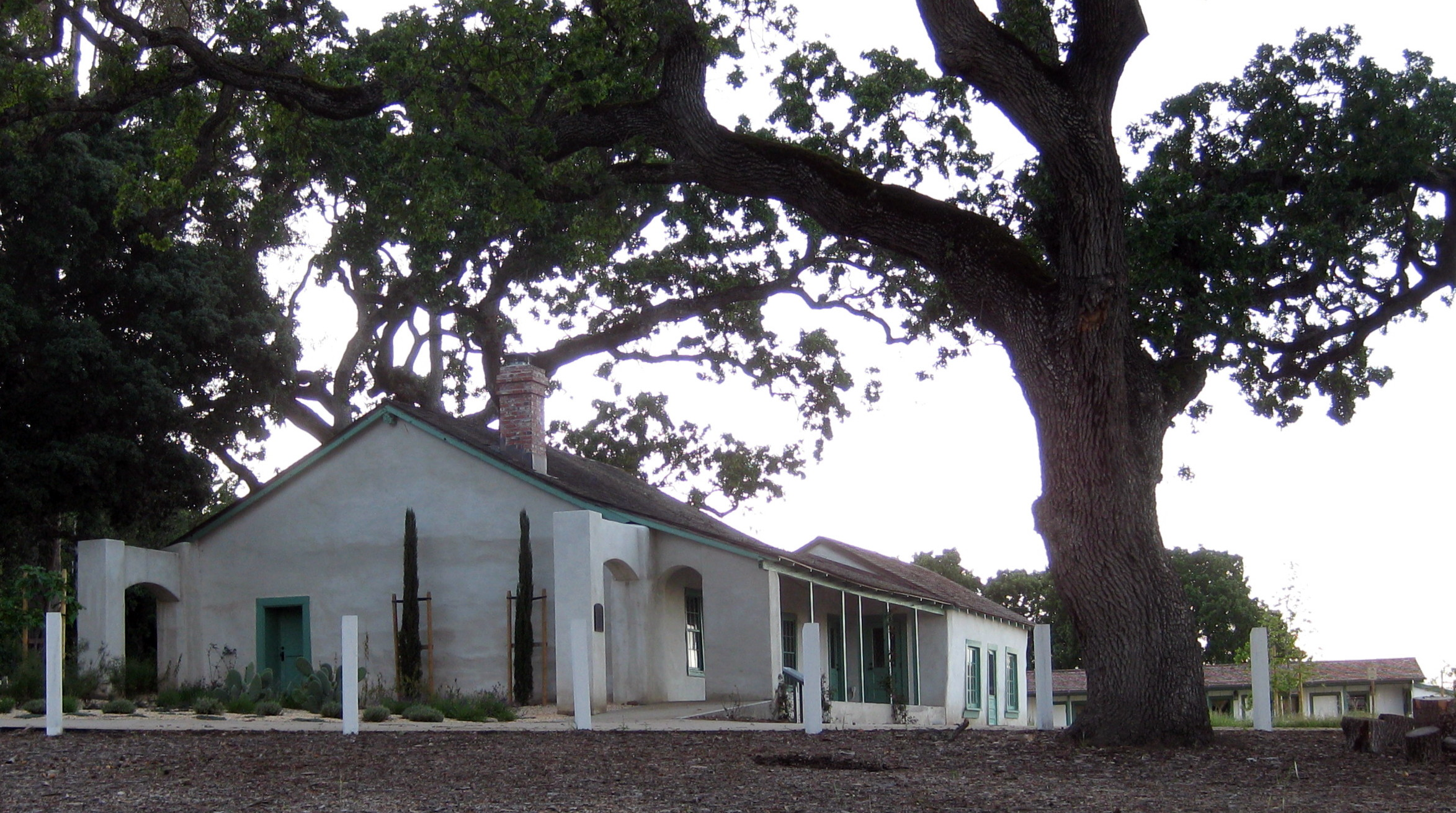
- The Alviso adobe

- Location within California
- 37.66063°N 121.91198°W
- Location: 3546 Old Foothill Road; Pleasanton, California 94588

History
- Built: 1854

Site notes
- Area: 7 acres (2.8 ha)
- Architect: Francisco Alviso

California Historical Landmark
- Official name: Francisco Solano Alviso Adobe
- Designated: September 24, 1953
- Reference no.: 510

The Alviso Adobe Community Park is a 7-acre (2.8 ha) park in the city of Pleasanton, California, United States. It is built around an adobe house constructed in 1854 by Francisco Alviso on the Rancho Santa Rita Mexican Land Grant. The Alviso Adobe is a rare surviving example of an early American adobe that was continuously in use until 1969. The building is registered as California Historical Landmark #510 in 1954, but most of the historical marker was later found to be erroneous.

Construction of the park was initially planned to begin in 2000, but the city could not secure funding until 2007, when the $4.4 million project was finally begun. The park opened to the public with a grand-opening ceremony on October 25, 2008. Besides the adobe, which is furnished as it would have been in the 1920s, the park contains a replica of an old dairy and interpretive displays of Ohlone culture.

== Alviso adobe ==
=== 1854 to 1969: from rancho to dairy ===
Built in 1854 by Francisco Alviso (1818- ), the adobe was on the lands of the 8,894-acre (35.99 km^{2}) Rancho Santa Rita, given in 1839 as a Mexican land grant to Jose Dolores Pacheco. Rancho Santa Rita was surrounded on the north by Rancho San Ramon (owned by Jose Maria Amador, Francisco Alviso's uncle) and on the east and south by Rancho Valle de San Jose (owned by Juan and Augustin Bernal and their brother-in-law Antonio Suñol). Francisco Alviso's father, Francisco Solano Alviso (1792- ), was once Pacheco's majordomo (ranch manager).

During the railroad boom period of the 1860s, Rancho Santa Rita was sub divided into fifteen smaller tracts of varying sizes. The Alviso Adobe became the center of a "small" 200-acre (0.8 km^{2}) farm overlooking the Amador Valley and was occupied by Francisco Alviso and his wife Maria Ysabel (1819- ) and their ten children. Alviso sold the property and land in 1872 to J. West Martin, a land speculator and later mayor of Oakland. Martin then resold it to Anthony Chabot, the "Water King". Census records indicate that the Alviso family continued to live there for almost 30 years until the 1880s.

Afterwards in 1881, it was acquired by the Contra Costa Water Company and used by a succession of different tenant farmer families. The 1906 San Francisco earthquake damaged the building, leaving large cracks in the walls and chimney.

In 1919, it was purchased by Walter M. Briggs, who started the Meadowlark Dairy, the first certified dairy in California. He had the building renovated and used it as housing for his workers. The adobe continued to serve this purpose until 1969, when the dairy moved its operations to Tracy.

=== Post-dairy developments ===
The Briggs company sold the farm and adobe in 1966 to the Great Southwest Corporation, who wanted to build an amusement park on the site, but this was hotly contested by local residents and the plan was scrapped. The company then sold it to a real-estate development company. Most of the land was then converted to individual housing lots, but the adobe, which had been declared a California Historical Landmark in 1954, and a few acres were donated in 1993 to the city of Pleasanton.

The historical marker #510 originally read:

FRANCISCO SOLANO ALVISO ADOBE - This building, erected in 1844-46 by Francisco Solano Alviso, was the first adobe house to be built in the Pleasanton Valley. It was originally called Alisal—The Sycamores. Following the Battle of Sunol Canyon, General John C. Frémont withdrew to this building, which became his headquarters for several days.

However, in a 2000 report issued in preparation for the city's renovation plan, historians discovered several errors in the original plaque. Firstly, the Alviso Adobe was confused with another adobe built ten years earlier by José Dolores Pacheco that was 0.5 miles (0.8 km) to the north and no longer standing. Additionally, construction was wrongly credited to Francisco Alviso's father, Franciso Solano Alviso (1792- ). Lastly, there is no evidence that John C. Frémont ever used the building or that a battle with local Indians ever occurred, as Frémont's memoirs place him in Santa Clara at the time. The historical marker has since been removed.

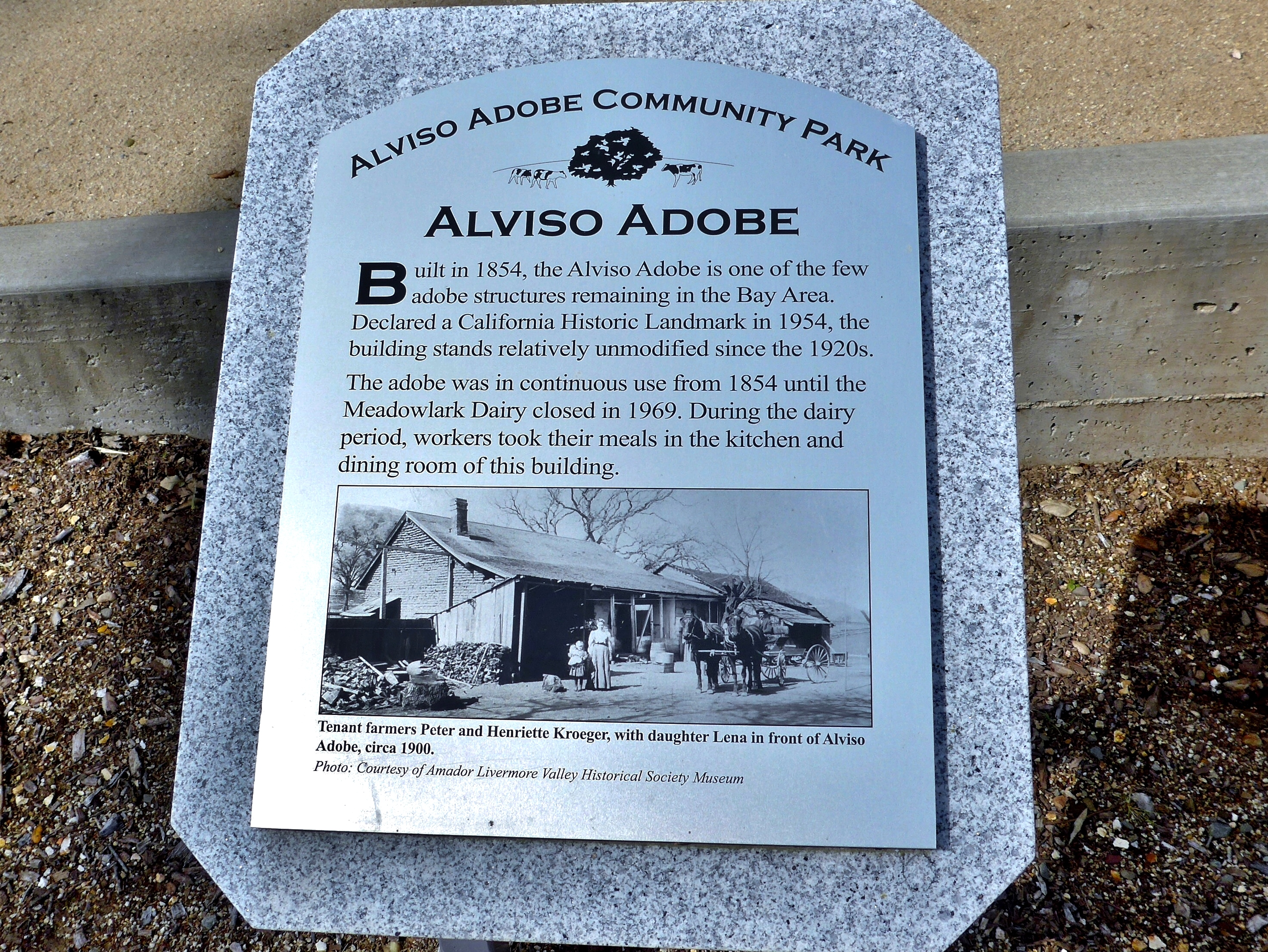
Plaque at the Alviso Adobe Community Park, Pleasanton, CA

The current plaque at Alviso Adobe Community Park states that the building was built in 1854 and features a photo, circa 1900, of the Alviso Adobe with its tenant farmer family who lived there from 1898 to 1917.

The 2000 Master Plan for the Alviso Adobe Community Park included a 39-foot replica of the white grain silo on the east side of the re-created Meadowlark Dairy. Objections from the local residents caused the planners and the city to revise the master plan and eliminate the silo from the park.
