= Pleasanton, California =

City in California, United States

- City
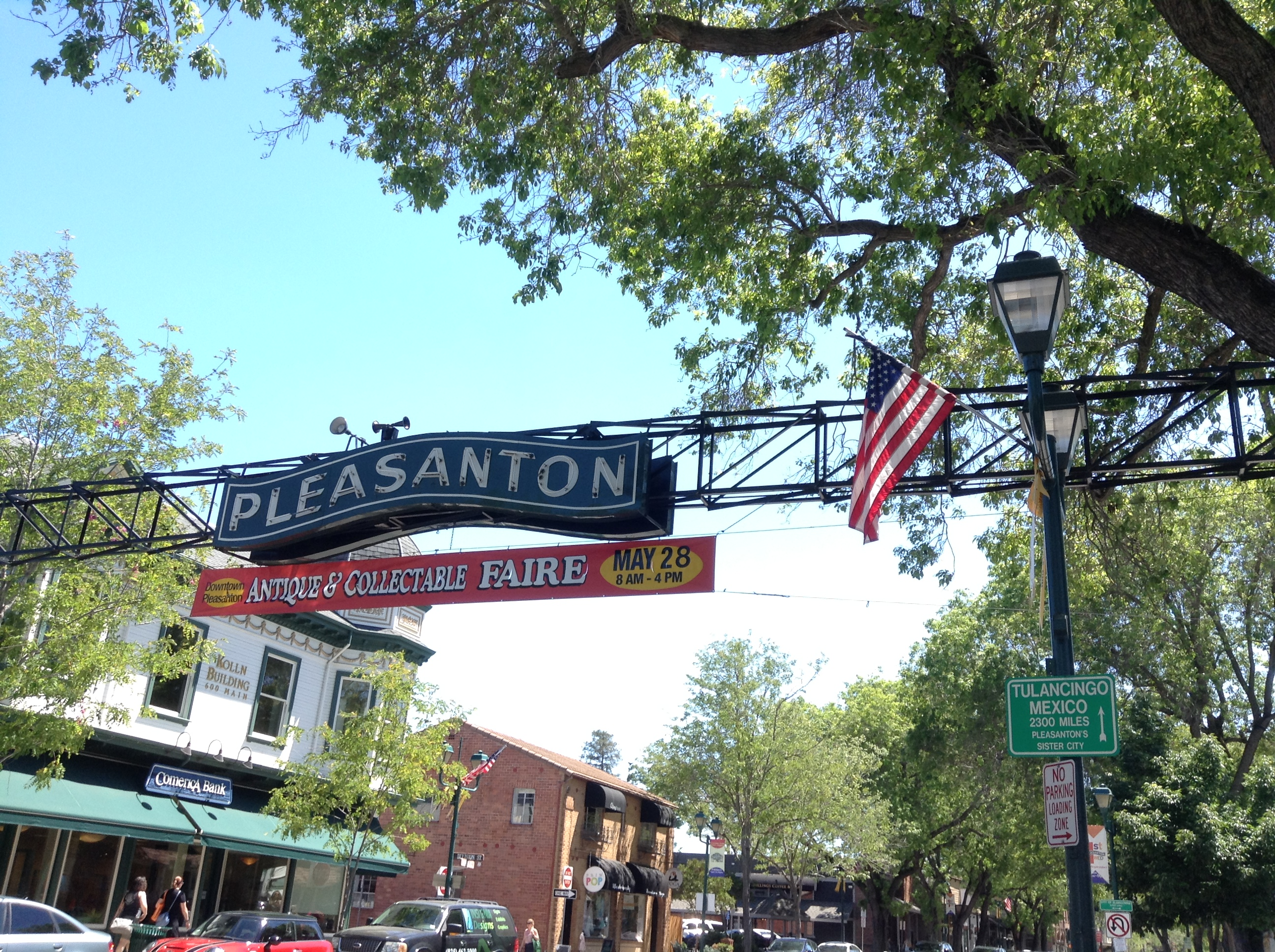
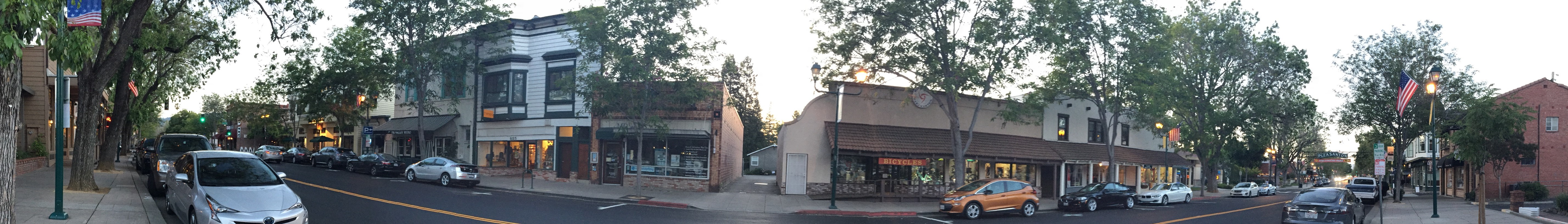
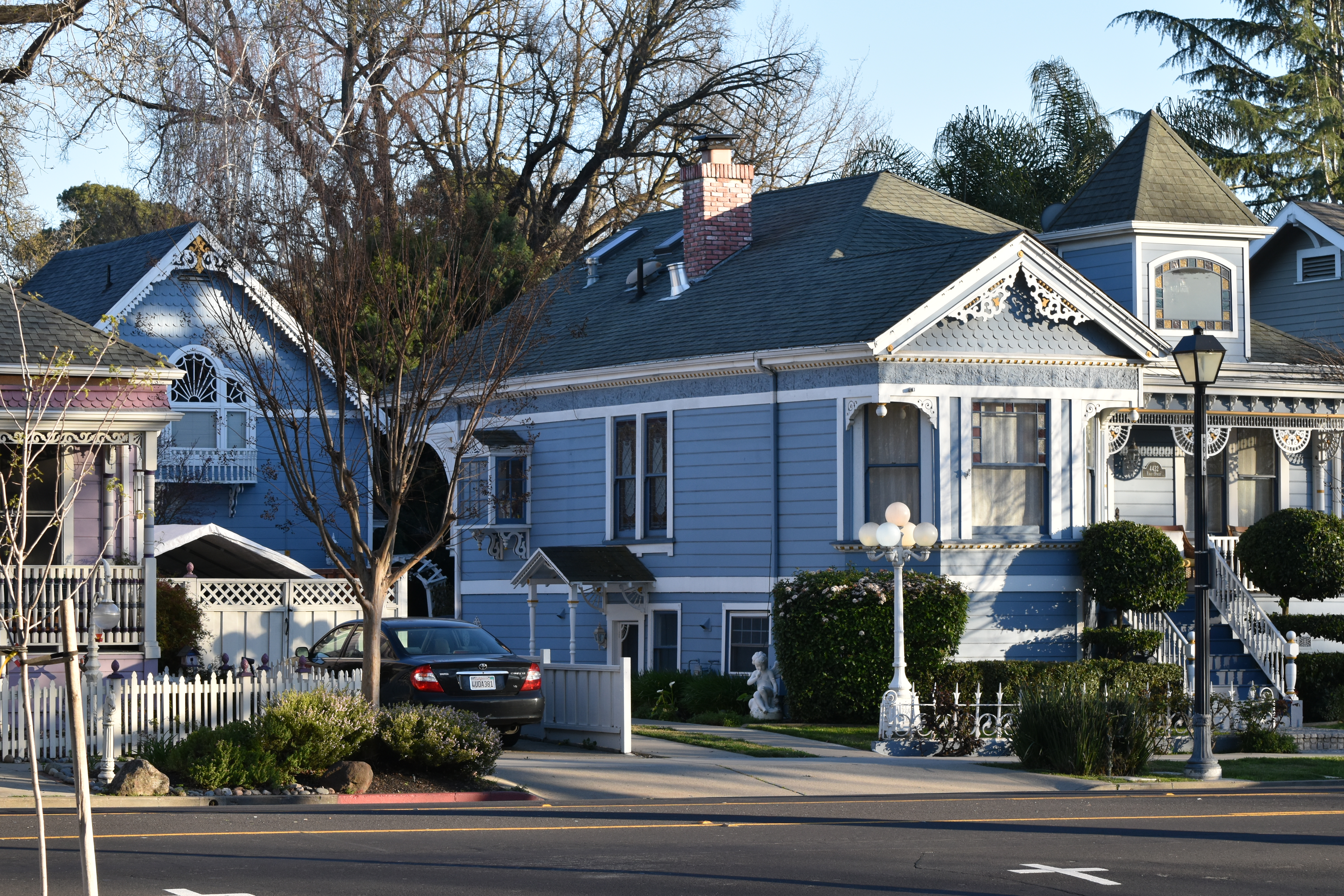
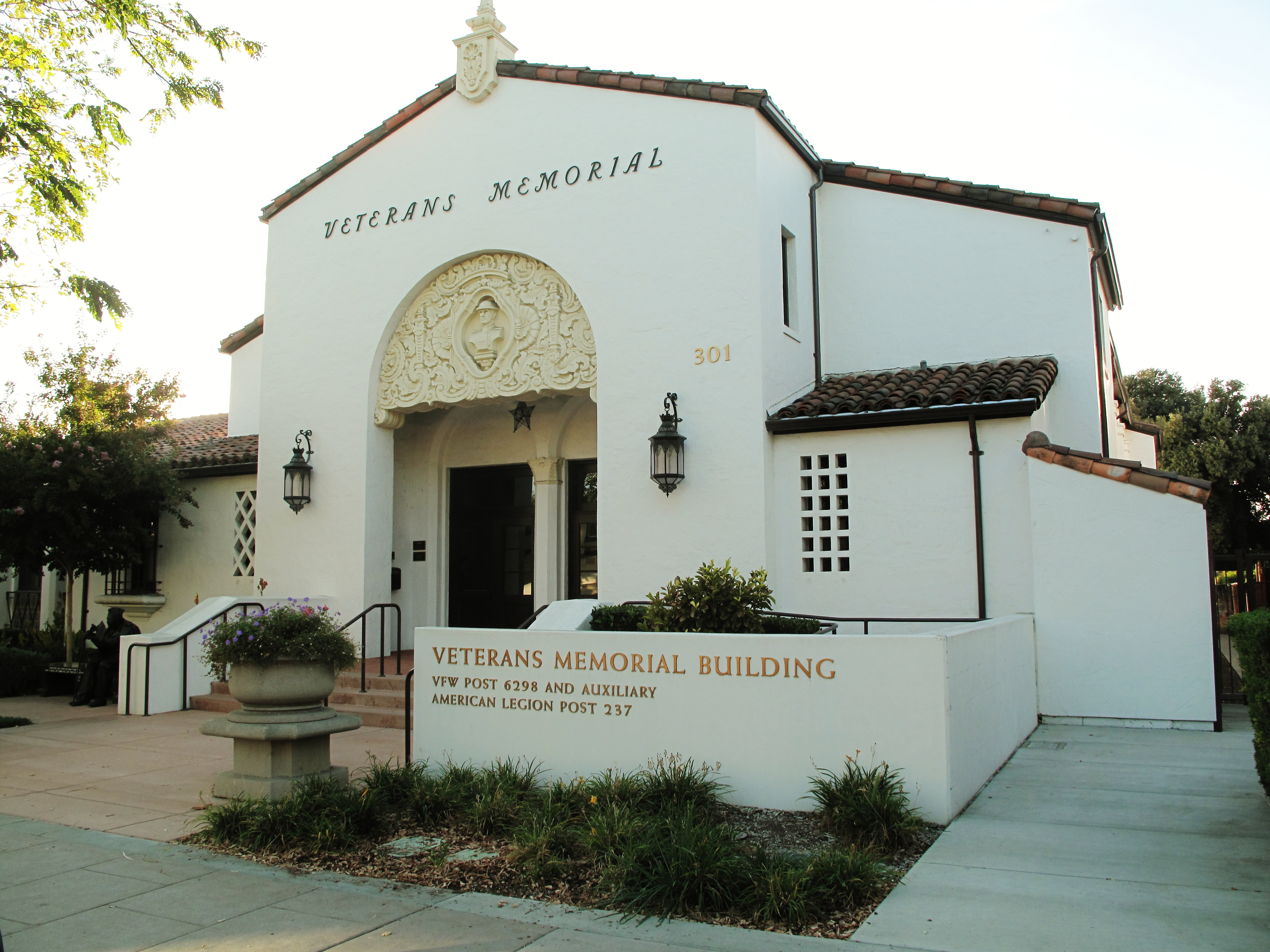
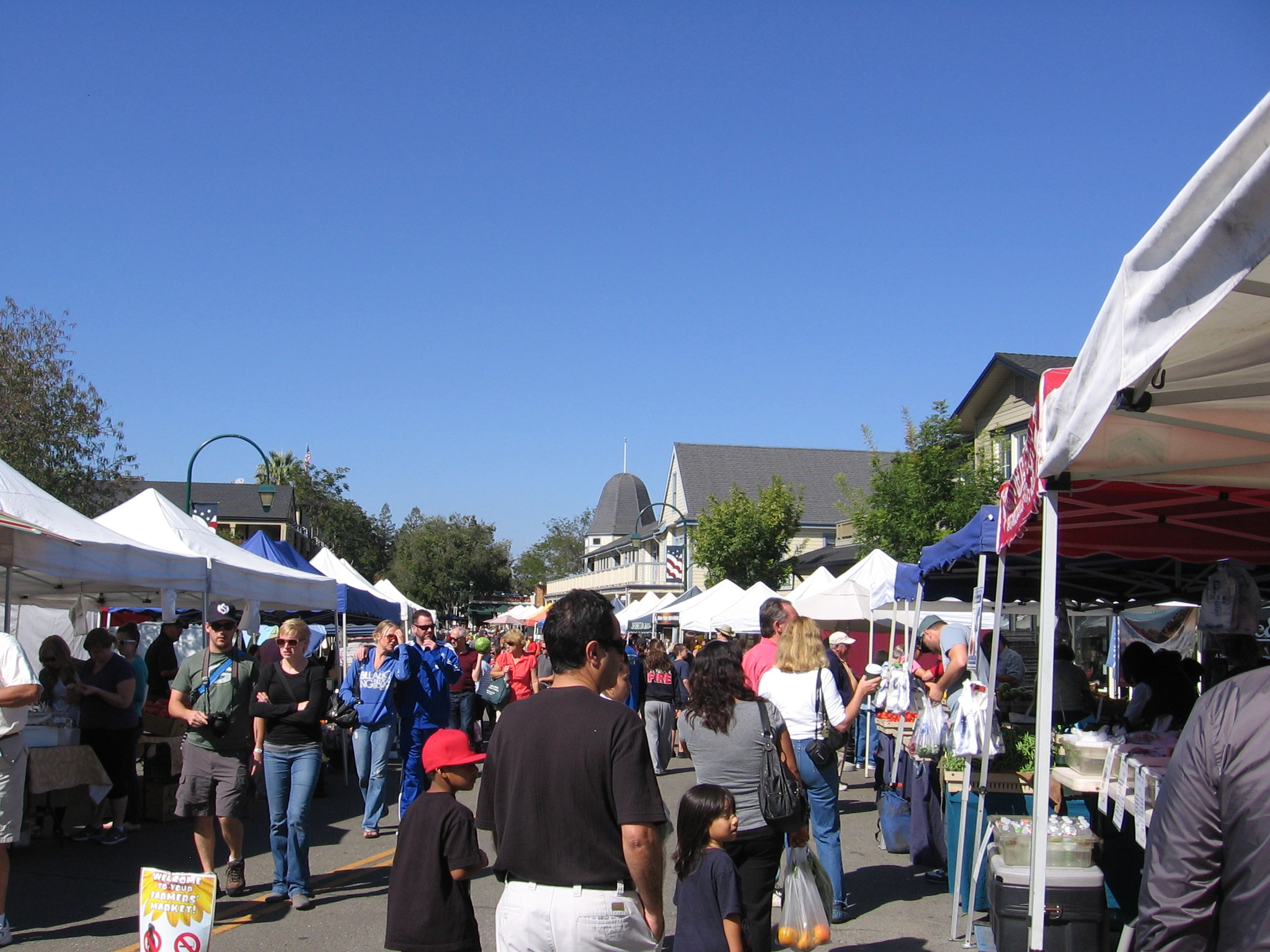
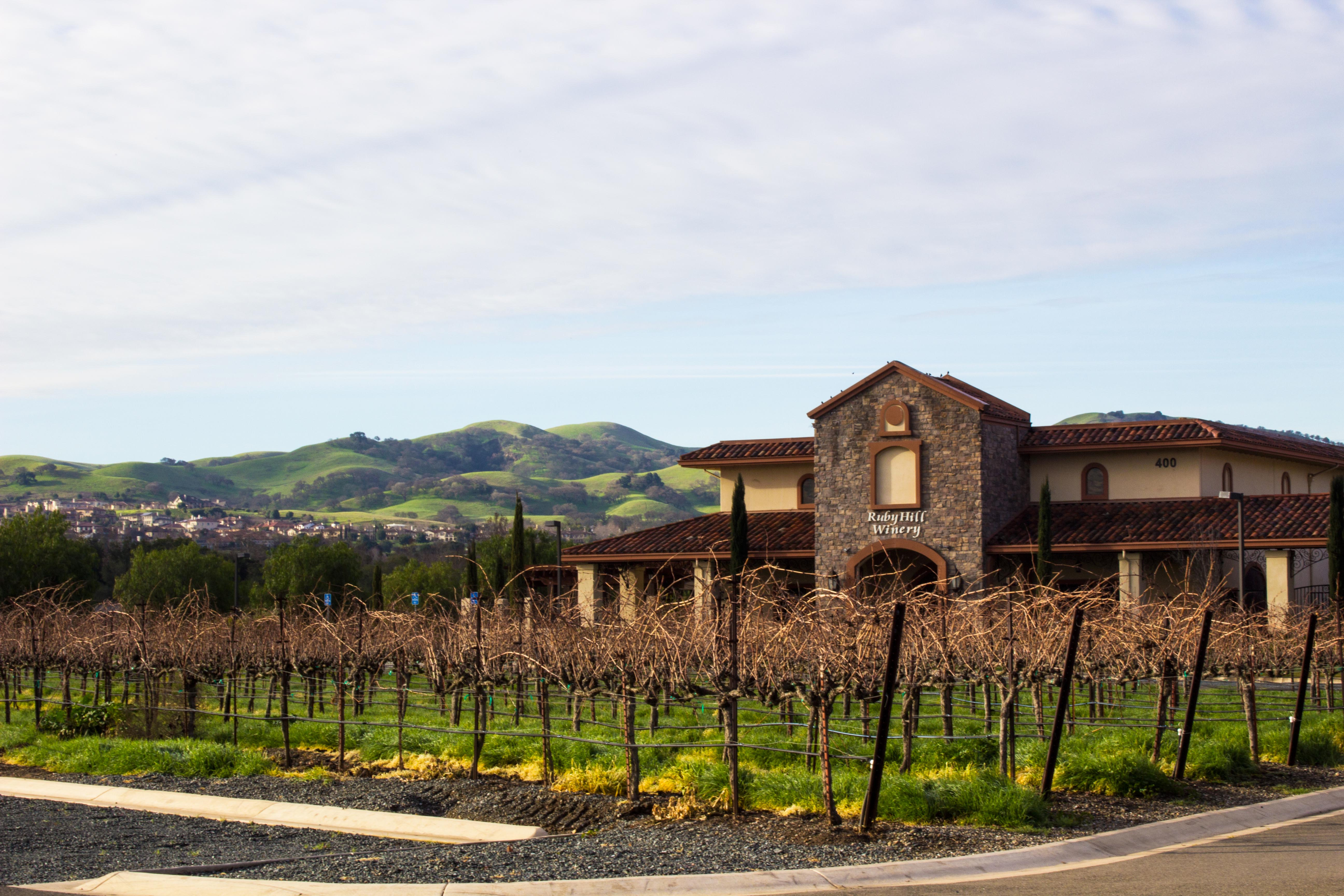
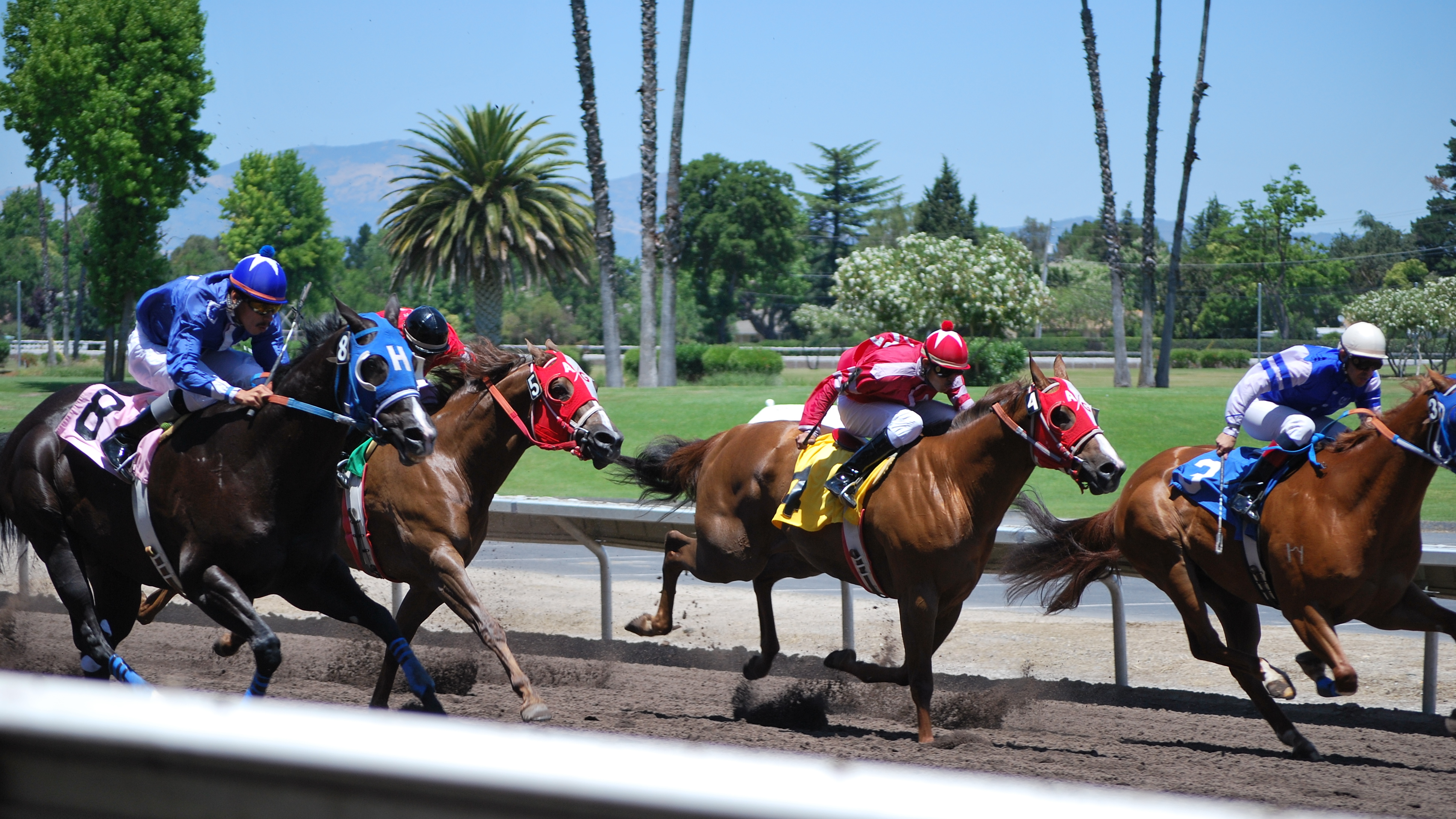
- Main Street sign Downtown panorama Houses along First Street in historic downtown area Veterans Memorial Building Farmers' Market Ruby Hill Winery Quarter horse racing at the Alameda County Fair

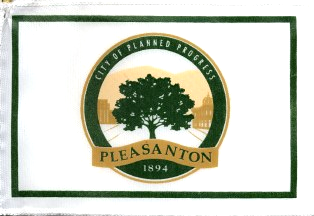
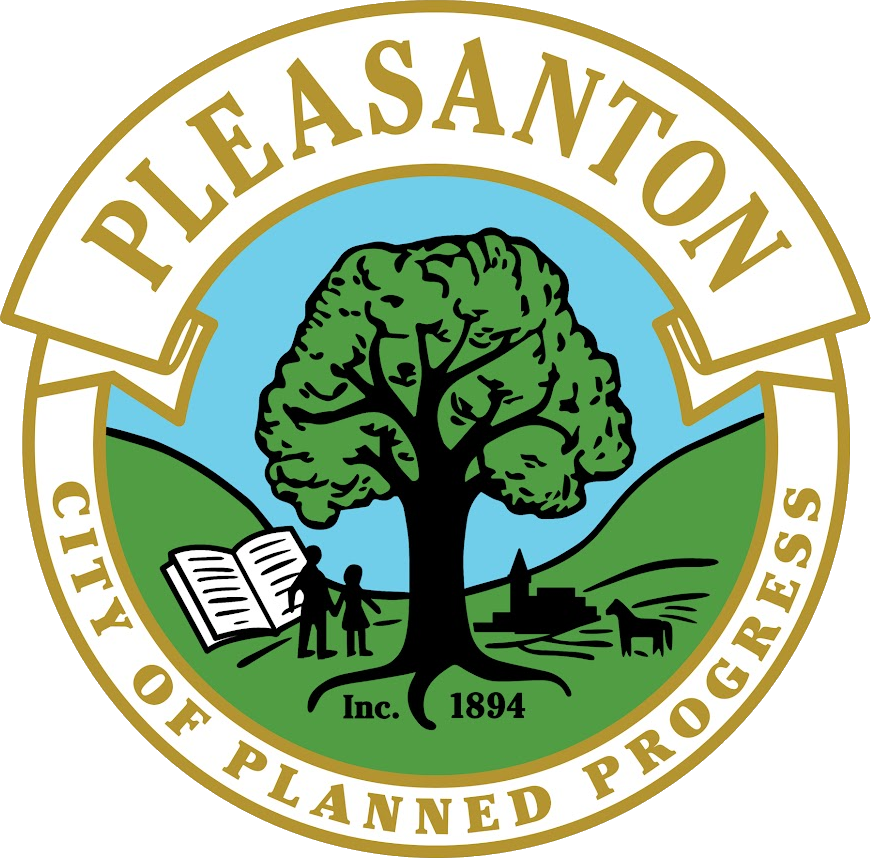
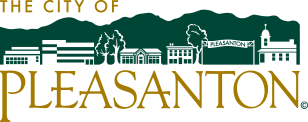
- Flag Seal Logo
- Nickname: The City of Planned Progress
- Coordinates: 37°39′45″N 121°52′29″W
- Country: United States
- State: California
- County: Alameda
- Mexican land grant: 1839
- Established: 1869
- Incorporated: June 18, 1894
- Named for: General Alfred Pleasonton

Government
  - Type: Council–manager
  - Mayor: Jack Balch
  - Vice Mayor: Matt Gaidos
  - City Council: Julie Testa; Jeffrey Nibert; Craig Eicher
  - City Manager: Gerry Beaudin

Area
  - Total: 24.29 sq mi (62.91 km^{2})
  - Land: 24.14 sq mi (62.52 km^{2})
  - Water: 0.15 sq mi (0.38 km^{2}) 0.61%
- Elevation: 351 ft (107 m)

Population (2020)
  - Total: 79,871
  - Rank: 109th in California; 444th in the U.S.
  - Density: 3,309/sq mi (1,278/km^{2})
- Time zone: UTC−8 (PST)
  - Summer (DST): UTC−7 (PDT)
- ZIP Codes: 94566, 94568, 94588
- Area code: 925
- FIPS code: 06-57792
- GNIS feature IDs: 277578, 2411441
- Website: www.cityofpleasantonca.gov

Pleasanton is a city in Alameda County, California, United States. Located in the Amador Valley, it is an upscale suburb in the East Bay region of the San Francisco Bay Area. The population was 79,871 at the 2020 census. In 2005 and 2007, Pleasanton was ranked the wealthiest middle-sized city in the United States by the Census Bureau.

Pleasanton is home to the headquarters of Safeway, Workday, Ellie Mae, Roche Molecular Diagnostics, Blackhawk Network Holdings, Veeva Systems, and Simpson Manufacturing Company. Other major employers include Kaiser Permanente, Oracle, and Macy's. Although Oakland is the Alameda County seat, a few county offices are located in Pleasanton.

The Alameda County Fairgrounds are located in Pleasanton, where the county fair is held during the last week of June and the first week of July. Pleasanton Ridge Regional Park is located on the west side of town.

== History ==
The Museum on Main is Pleasanton's historical museum

=== Pre-contact ===
The Amador-Livermore Valley, where Pleasanton is located, was home to tribes in the Ohlone language group, mainly speaking Chochenyo. As of the 1770s seven tribes were present in the valley: the Causen, Pelnen, Seunen, Ssaoan, Ssouyen, Taunan, and Yulien. Each had a territory about 10 miles across, living in villages of 60-90 people. The total population of the valley was about 2000-2500 people.

=== 1700s ===
The first Spanish expedition reached the Amador-Livermore Valley in 1772. Native people from the valley began to join Mission Santa Clara, founded in 1777, in small numbers by the 1790s. Large groups began joining missions after Mission San Jose was founded in 1797.

=== 1800s ===
After Mexico's independence from Spain in 1821, the missions were secularized, the Native people being emancipated and the land given in the form of ranchos to Spanish and Mexican colonists. Pleasanton is located on the lands of the Rancho Valle de San José and Rancho Santa Rita Mexican land grants.

==== Alisal ====
Before the establishment of Pleasanton in the 1850s, an earlier settlement in the location was called Alisal. It was located on the lands of the Rancho Santa Rita near the site of a Native American ranchera, around the Francisco Solano Alviso Adobe called El Alisal (The Sycamores), one of the earliest houses built in the valley in 1844. It is still standing and serves as the centerpiece of the Alviso Adobe Community Park. Alisal, nicknamed "The Most Desperate Town in the West", was one of the settlements located along La Vereda del Monte that was a haunt and refuge of bandits and desperados in the era following the beginning of the California Gold Rush. Main Street shootouts were not uncommon. Banditos such as Claudio Feliz and Joaquin Murrieta ambushed prospectors on their way back from the gold rush fields and then sought refuge in Alisal. In the 1860s Procopio, Narciso Bojorques and others took refuge there. Alisal Elementary School reflects the city's original name.

==== Founding ====
The Rancho Valle de San José grant had been given to Agustín and Juan Pablo Bernal and their brothers-in-law Antonio Suñol and Antonio Maria Pico. In order to safeguard the grant from squatters during the Gold Rush in the 1840s-1850s, the Bernal family moved from San José to live on their ranch along with John Kottinger, an Austrian immigrant and a lawyer who had married into the family.

"Pleasanton" was chosen as the town's name in the 1860s by John W. Kottinger, an Alameda County justice of the peace, who named it after his friend, Union army cavalry Major General Alfred Pleasonton. A typographical error by a recording clerk in Washington, D.C., apparently led to the current spelling.

=== 1900s ===
In 1917, Pleasanton was the backdrop for the film Rebecca of Sunnybrook Farm, starring Mary Pickford. The town was once home to Phoebe Apperson Hearst, who lived in a 50-room mansion on a 2,000 acres (8.1 km^{2}) estate, now the site of Castlewood Country Club.

Radum Plant was a sand and gravel plant opened in 1931 by Henry J. Kaiser Co., at Radum train station, one mile east of Pleasanton.

After World War II, Pleasanton changed from being primarily focused on farming and ranching to being a bedroom community and a place for corporate headquarters due to major growth of the Bay Area.

== Geography ==
Pleasanton is adjacent to Hayward, Livermore, and Dublin. According to the United States Census Bureau, the city has a total area of 24.3 square miles (63 km^{2}), of which 24.1 square miles (62 km^{2}) is land and 0.15 square miles (0.39 km^{2}) (0.61%) is water. On the east side of town on Stanley Blvd. near the Livermore border is Shadow Cliffs Regional Park, a lake that permits swimming, fishing, and boating. On the west side is the Pleasanton Ridge with two parks, Pleasanton Ridge and Augustin Bernal Park. Much of Pleasanton is drained by the Arroyo Valle and Arroyo Mocho watercourses. Pleasanton lies along the route of the historic First transcontinental railroad.

=== Climate ===
Pleasanton features a Mediterranean climate, featuring hot, dry summers and mild to cool winters with occasional rainfall (Köppen climate classification Csa). The highest recorded temperature was 115 °F (46 °C) in 1950. The lowest recorded temperature was 17 °F (−8 °C) in 1990.

Climate data for Pleasanton, California
Month	Jan	Feb	Mar	Apr	May	Jun	Jul	Aug	Sep	Oct	Nov	Dec	Year
Record high °F (°C)	75 (24)	80 (27)	88 (31)	96 (36)	104 (40)	113 (45)	112 (44)	112 (44)	115 (46)	106 (41)	90 (32)	79 (26)	115 (46)
Mean daily maximum °F (°C)	58 (14)	62 (17)	65 (18)	71 (22)	77 (25)	84 (29)	89 (32)	89 (32)	86 (30)	78 (26)	65 (18)	57 (14)	73 (23)
Mean daily minimum °F (°C)	37 (3)	40 (4)	42 (6)	44 (7)	48 (9)	53 (12)	55 (13)	55 (13)	53 (12)	48 (9)	42 (6)	37 (3)	46 (8)
Record low °F (°C)	17 (−8)	23 (−5)	22 (−6)	29 (−2)	32 (0)	30 (−1)	36 (2)	40 (4)	35 (2)	29 (−2)	23 (−5)	18 (−8)	17 (−8)
Average precipitation inches (mm)	2.99 (76)	2.77 (70)	2.47 (63)	0.96 (24)	0.43 (11)	0.09 (2.3)	0.03 (0.76)	0.08 (2.0)	0.24 (6.1)	0.84 (21)	1.88 (48)	2.04 (52)	14.48 (368)
Source 1: The Weather Channel
Source 2: Weather Atlas

== Demographics ==
Historical population
Census	Pop.	Note	%±
1870	350		—
1880	600		71.4%
1890	984		64.0%
1900	1,100		11.8%
1910	1,254		14.0%
1920	991		−21.0%
1930	1,237		24.8%
1940	1,278		3.3%
1950	2,244		75.6%
1960	4,203		87.3%
1970	18,328		336.1%
1980	35,160		91.8%
1990	50,533		43.7%
2000	63,654		26.0%
2010	70,285		10.4%
2020	79,871		13.6%
2025 (est.)	74,556	▼	−6.7%
U.S. Decennial Census; 1860–1870 1880-1890; 1900 1910 1920; 1930 1940 1950; 1960 1970 1980; 1990 2000 2010; 2020

=== Racial and ethnic composition ===
Pleasanton, California – Racial and ethnic composition Note: the US Census treats Hispanic/Latino as an ethnic category. This table excludes Latinos from the racial categories and assigns them to a separate category. Hispanics/Latinos may be of any race.
Race / Ethnicity (NH = Non-Hispanic)	Pop 2000	Pop 2010	Pop 2020	% 2000	% 2010	% 2020
White alone (NH)	48,253	42,738	34,332	75.81%	60.81%	42.98%
Black or African American alone (NH)	845	1,116	1,332	1.33%	1.59%	1.67%
Native American or Alaska Native alone (NH)	147	143	137	0.23%	0.20%	0.17%
Asian alone (NH)	7,387	16,209	31,500	11.60%	23.06%	39.44%
Native Hawaiian or Pacific Islander alone (NH)	74	125	110	0.12%	0.18%	0.14%
Other race alone (NH)	143	153	472	0.22%	0.22%	0.59%
Mixed race or Multiracial (NH)	1,794	2,537	4,106	2.82%	3.61%	5.14%
Hispanic or Latino (any race)	5,011	7,264	7,882	7.87%	10.34%	9.87%
Total	63,654	70,285	79,871	100.00%	100.00%	100.00%

=== 2020 census ===
As of the 2020 census, Pleasanton had a population of 79,871. The median age was 41.4 years. 24.0% of residents were under the age of 18 and 15.5% of residents were 65 years of age or older. For every 100 females there were 95.6 males, and for every 100 females age 18 and over there were 92.9 males age 18 and over.

98.9% of residents lived in urban areas, while 1.1% lived in rural areas.

There were 28,527 households in Pleasanton, of which 39.6% had children under the age of 18 living in them. Of all households, 64.7% were married-couple households, 11.4% were households with a male householder and no spouse or partner present, and 20.0% were households with a female householder and no spouse or partner present. About 18.9% of all households were made up of individuals and 9.4% had someone living alone who was 65 years of age or older.

There were 29,624 housing units, of which 3.7% were vacant. The homeowner vacancy rate was 0.6% and the rental vacancy rate was 5.3%.

Racial composition as of the 2020 census
Race	Number	Percent
White	36,046	45.1%
Black or African American	1,396	1.7%
American Indian and Alaska Native	300	0.4%
Asian	31,636	39.6%
Native Hawaiian and Other Pacific Islander	120	0.2%
Some other race	2,828	3.5%
Two or more races	7,545	9.4%

=== 2023 ACS 5-year estimates ===
In 2023, the US Census Bureau estimated that the median household income was $186,206, and the per capita income was $86,151. About 2.8% of families and 5.5% of the population were below the poverty line.

== Economy ==
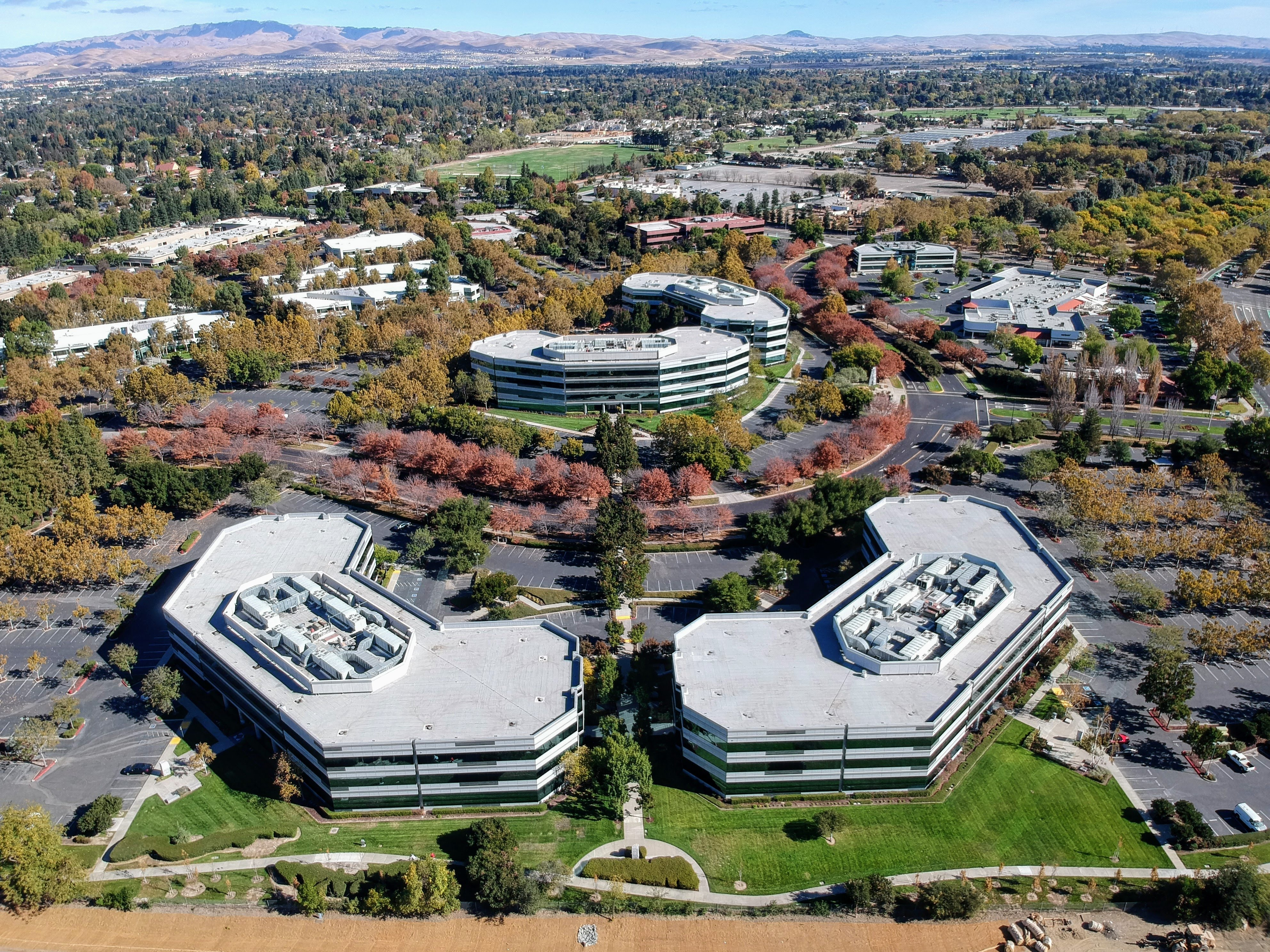
Bernal Corporate Park

Pleasanton experienced a major economic boom starting in the early 1980s, largely associated with the development of a number of business parks, the largest of which is the Hacienda Business Park. These host a number of campus-like clusters of low-rise and medium-rise office buildings. Pleasanton has been successful in attracting a number of corporate headquarters, such as those of Safeway, Blackhawk Network Holdings, Workday, Simpson Manufacturing, The Cooper Companies and Shaklee. Despite an increase in office space vacancy rates in 2000–2004, economic development has remained strong through the middle of the decade.

Pleasanton was also the headquarters of the former PeopleSoft, Inc. (which was acquired by Oracle Corporation), Documentum (which was acquired by EMC Corporation), Thoratec (now part of Abbott), E-Loan (which was acquired by Popular), Spreckels Sugar Company (which was acquired by Imperial Holly), Ross Stores (which moved to nearby Dublin in 2014), Patelco Credit Union (also moved to Dublin) and the home loan operation of Providian (which was acquired by Washington Mutual, itself later acquired by JPMorgan Chase). Oracle occupies two buildings of the former PeopleSoft campus. In addition, Pleasanton is the site of a large AT&T campus.

Other companies with major operations in Pleasanton include Hitachi High Technologies America, Inc., Cisco Systems, QASource, Sage Software (Accpac, etc.), CooperVision, Clorox, Fireside Bank (closed in 2012), Roche, BMC Software, Zoho Corporation, Applied Biosystems, EMC Corporation, Portrait Displays, Inc. and Broadcom Inc.

In retail operations, Pleasanton has one major regional mall (Stoneridge Shopping Center) and a number of other shopping centers. In addition to the business parks and retail centers, Pleasanton is known for its downtown, which is home to a number of fine-dining, casual, and ethnic restaurants, specialty retailers, and service businesses. A redesign of Main Street in the 1990s emphasized pedestrian traffic and outdoor dining.

In 2005, the median household income in Pleasanton was $101,022, the highest income for any city with a population between 65,000 and 249,999 people. Similarly, for 2007, the median household income rose to $113,345, also the highest in the category. According to City-Data.com, the median household income had risen to $121,622 by 2013, compared to a statewide median of $60,190.

According to the Bay East Association of Realtors, the median price of a detached single family home was $1,795,000 as of August 2021. According to Zillow.com, the median home value in Pleasanton was $1,500,415 as of September 2021.

=== Top employers ===
According to the city, as of July 2024 the top fifteen employers in Pleasanton are:

#	Employer	Employees
1	Workday	5,399
2	Kaiser Permanente	3,019
3	Pleasanton Unified School District	1,373
4	Safeway	1,348
5	Stanford Health Care Tri-Valley	1,124
6	Veeva Systems	945
7	Roche Molecular Diagnostics	927
8	Oracle Corporation	882
9	10x Genomics	600
10	Life Technologies	579
11	ICE Mortgage Technology	548
12	SMM Facilities Inc	442
13	Blackhawk Network Holdings	383
14	Clorox Services Company	369
15	Sensiba San Filippo, LLP	331

== Arts and culture ==
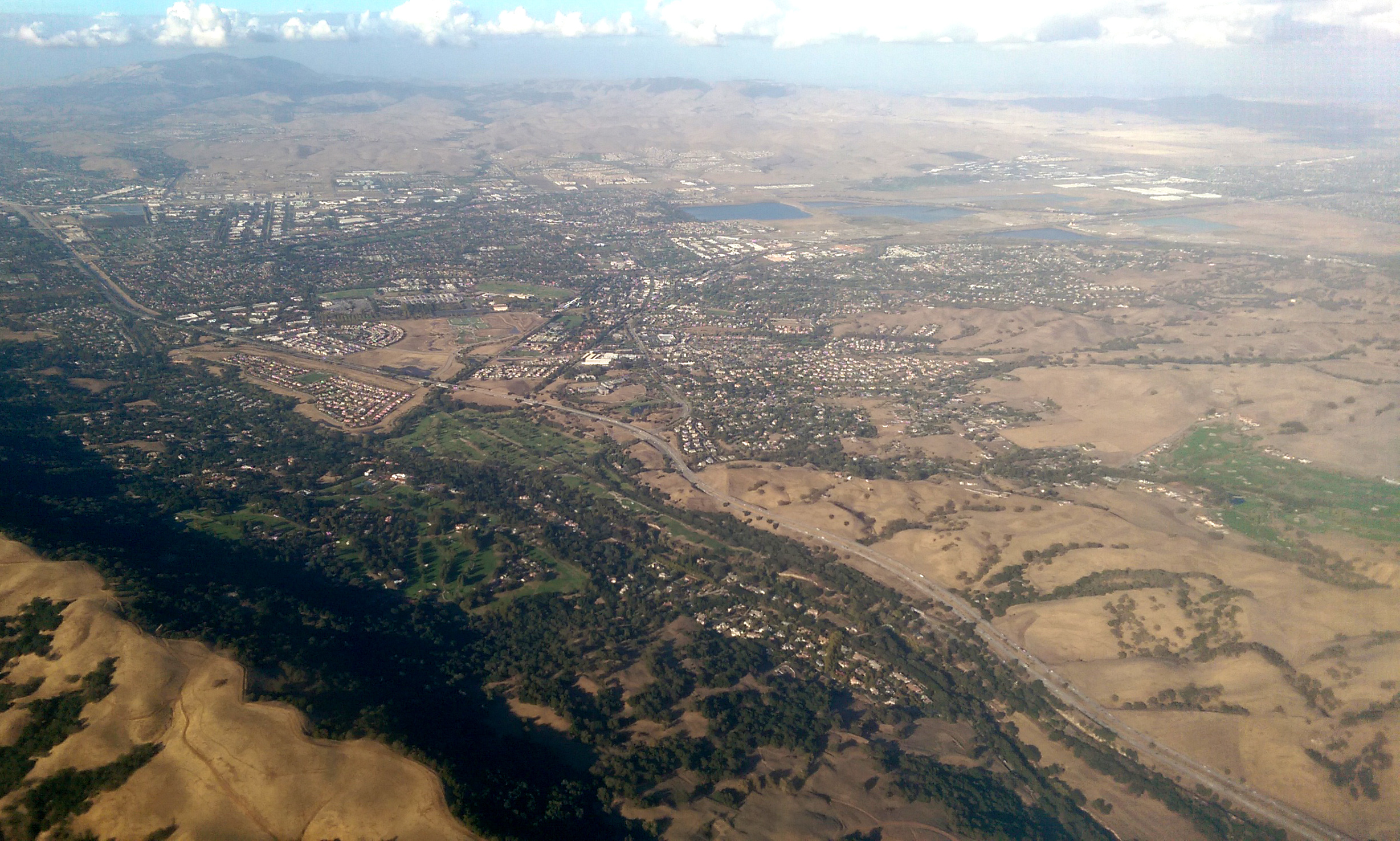
Pleasanton, looking north, with three quarry lakes of East Pleasanton in upper center

=== Events and festivals ===
Pleasanton maintains regular events for the community. Every Saturday morning a farmers' market is set up along Angela Street, off Main Street. There are several parades during the year, commemorating Christmas, Memorial Day, and Veterans Day, as well as kicking off the beginning of the Alameda County Fair and soccer season.

==== First Wednesday ====
Beginning in the late 1990s, the Pleasanton Downtown Association organized the popular First Wednesday celebrations from May through September of each year. On the first Wednesday of summer months, Main Street was blocked to traffic and adopted a street fair atmosphere. Each First Wednesday celebration was given a theme and planned with related activities. At this local event, businesses and organizations from downtown and around the Tri-Valley set up booths in the center of the street. A local band performed in the Inklings coffee house parking lot, which was closed off for dancing. The parking lot was also set up as a beergarden, with beer and wine available for consumption. In 2017, the association announced it was discontinuing the events, and was considering other types of events in future years.

==== Friday Concerts in the Park ====
Another Pleasanton Downtown Association tradition is the Friday Concerts in the Park series. Every Friday from June until September the PDA schedules different local bands to perform in the evenings at the Lions' Wayside Park off of First Street. The events are free of charge and draw a crowd. Additional seating for 'Concerts in the Park' is available at Delucchi Park, at the intersection of First Street and Neal Street.

==== Fairgrounds ====
The Alameda County Fairgrounds is a 270-acre (110 ha) facility located in Pleasanton. It is home to the annual Alameda County Fair, held since 1912, as well as numerous trade shows and community events including the Scottish Highland Gathering and Games, an annual Labor Day weekend event held at the fairgrounds since 1994. Located on its grounds, the Pleasanton Fairgrounds Racetrack was built in 1858, making it the oldest 1-mile (1.6 km) horse racing track in the United States. There is a 3,000 seat amphitheater, as well as a nine-hole golf course located within the track's infield.

The Alameda County Central Railroad Society has maintained a model train exhibit at the fairgrounds since 1959.

==== Architecture ====
Because of the preservation of Pleasanton's historic downtown area, many examples of architectural styles dating back to the mid-19th century exist. Buildings in Gothic Revival, Pioneer, Italianate, Commercial Italianate, Colonial Revival, and Queen Anne styles can be found within walking distance of each other.

One of the icons of downtown Pleasanton is the Kolln Hardware building, located at 600 Main Street. It is designed in the Commercial Italianate style, but the prominent five-sided corner tower and a few other features are indicative of the Colonial Revival style. The structure mixes in a little bit of Queen Anne design in the tower and gable. This building was built in 1890 and has always housed a hardware store, first by the Lewis Brothers, then Cruikshank and Kolln. The hardware store has been known as Kolln Hardware since 1933. In 2004, the Kolln Hardware business shut its doors. Bud Cornett, a Pleasanton developer, purchased the landmark and has invested in its renovation and earthquake retrofit. After more than 100 years of serving the community as a hardware store, the space is now occupied by Comerica Bank.

==== Firehouse Arts Center ====
The Firehouse Arts Center, opened in 2010, is a center of culture and art for Pleasanton. It features a 221-seat theater, the Harrington art gallery, and classrooms for art and drama.

=== Hacienda del Pozo de Verona ===
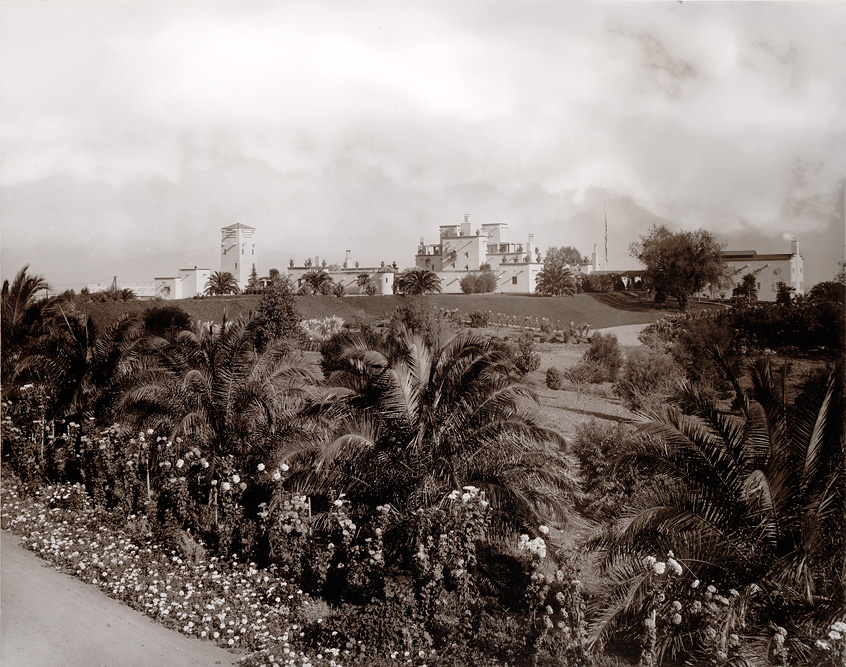
Hacienda del Pozo de Verona exterior, circa 1900

Hacienda del Pozo de Verona (The House of the Wellhead of Verona) was destroyed in a fire in 1969. The house was built by architect A. C. Schweinfurth for Phoebe Hearst in 1898. Phoebe Apperson Hearst had the hacienda remodeled and expanded by architect Julia Morgan for use as her primary residence after her husband died. The estate was built upon a 453-acre (1.83 km^{2}) rancheria obtained in 1886 by George Hearst, who intended to use the location for a race horse farm. Its name was inspired by the circular, carved marble wellhead purchased by Phoebe and William in Verona, Italy and installed in the middle of the courtyard. The hacienda was the only female-owned estate to be mentioned in Porter Garnett's Stately Homes of California. The architecture of the hacienda has been called California Mission style by various sources. The original architect used the term "provincial Spanish Renaissance", while Garnett wrote it would be more accurately called "Hispano-Moresque". Moorish influence was found throughout the estate, such as in the guardhouses which stood on either side of the courtyard entrance. The hacienda was topped by imported red Spanish tiles and had undecorated walls of white stucco. After Phoebe's death in 1919, William had the wellhead and other furniture and objects moved to Hearst Castle at San Simeon and sold the estate.

== Government ==
=== Local ===
Pleasanton operates under a council–manager form of municipal government. The council consists of four representatives elected by district and one mayor elected at-large. The councilors are each elected to a four-year term, while the mayor serves a two-year term. Council and mayoral elections are non-partisan. The vice mayor is appointed each calendar year by the mayor. The mayor and council members are limited to a maximum term of eight years.

The city council consists of: Jack Balch (mayor), Craig Eicher, Matt Gaidos, Jeffrey Nibert, and Julie Testa. The city manager is Gerry Beaudin.

=== State and Federal ===
In the state legislature Pleasanton is in the 5th senatorial district, represented by Democrat Jerry McNerney, who will be termed out. In the state assembly Pleasanton is in the 16th Assembly district, represented by Democrat Rebecca Bauer-Kahan and the 20th Assembly district, represented by Democrat Liz Ortega. Federally, Pleasanton is in California's 14th congressional district, represented by Democrat Aisha Wahab.

Pleasanton has 44,099 registered voters with 17,021 (39.2%) registered as Democrats, 11,338 (25.7%) registered as Republicans, and 13,867 (31.4%) Decline to State voters.

Pleasanton vote by party in presidential elections
Year	Democratic	Republican
2024	65.3% 24,120	30.7% 11,317
2020	68.5% 28,340	29.3% 12,127
2016	63.1% 21,897	30.4% 10,537
2012	57.9% 19,175	40.0% 13,240
2008	60.2% 20,857	38.1% 13,226
2004	52.4% 16,469	46.6% 14,633
2000	48.0% 13,506	48.4% 13,633
1996	46.0% 11,925	45.2% 11,729
1992	38.5% 10,622	37.3% 10,291
1988	37.5% 8,236	61.4% 13,495
1984	29.4% 5,208	69.7% 12,333
1980	25.4% 3,572	61.7% 8,665
1976	39.4% 4,821	59.0% 7,220
1972	30.2% 3,636	67.8% 8,178
1968	38.2% 1,779	54.1% 2,521
1964	57.0% 1,148	43.0% 866

== Education ==
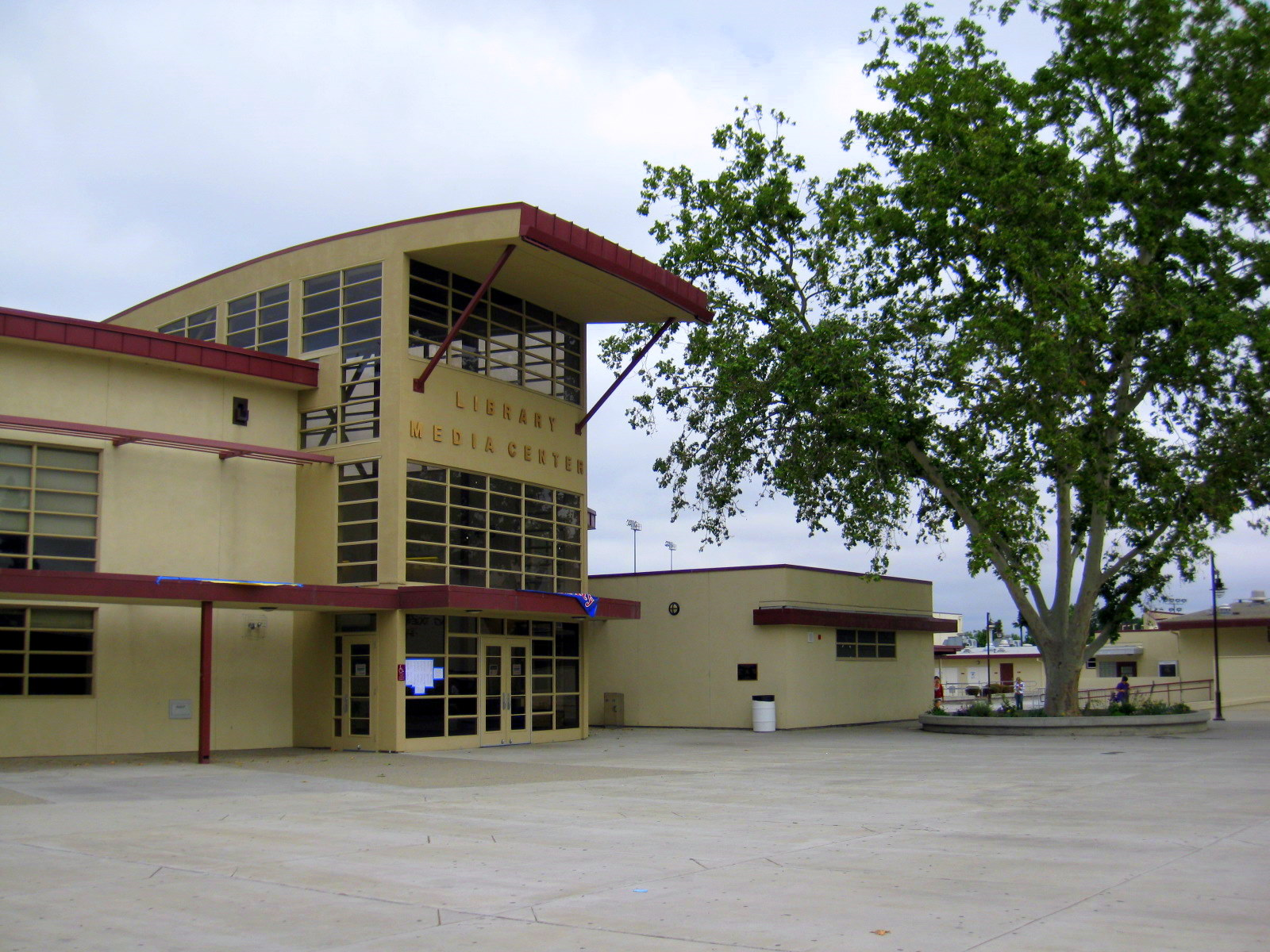
Amador Valley was the first high school in Pleasanton.

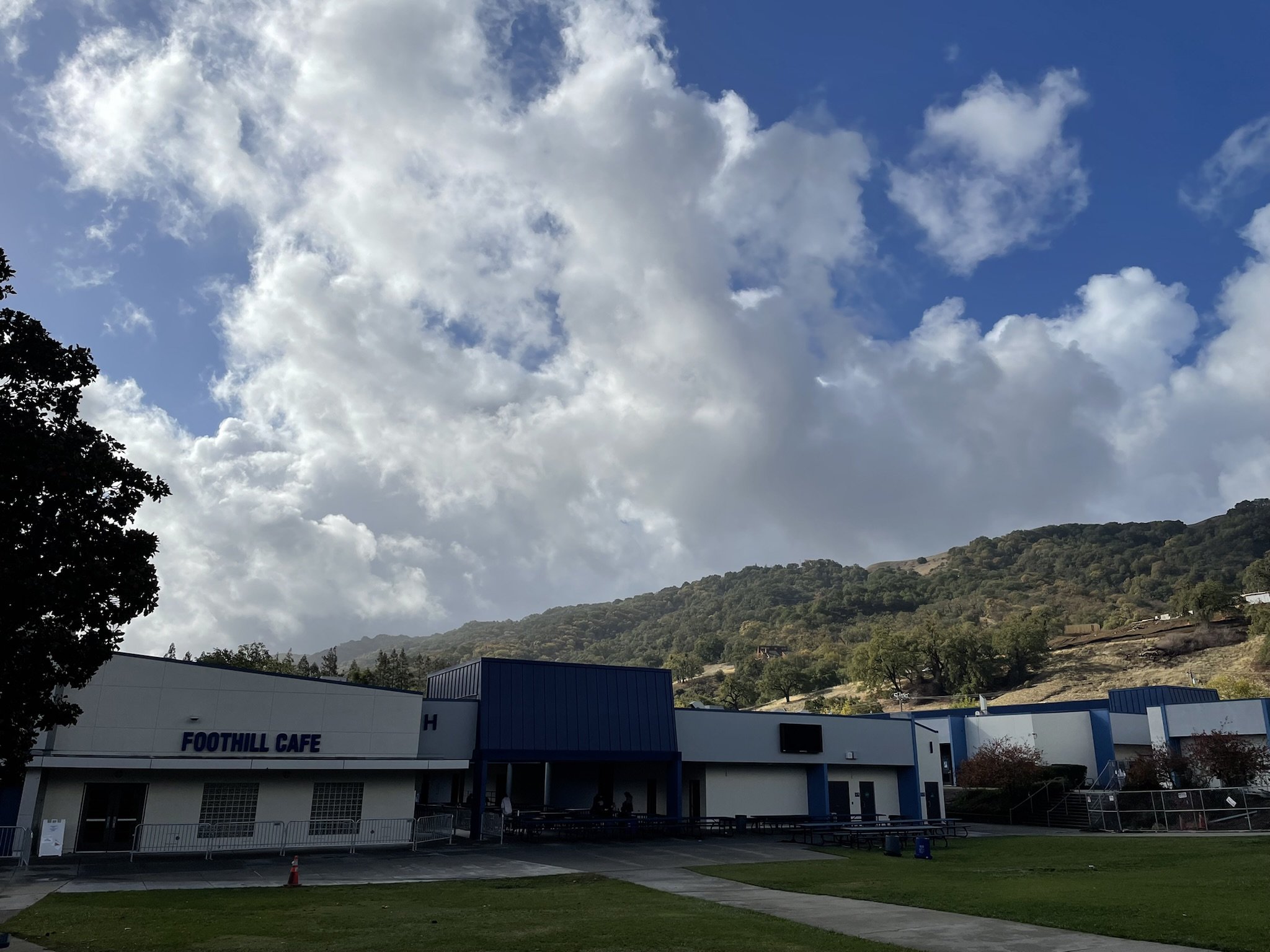
Foothill High opened for students in 1973.

For the majority of Pleasanton, the public schools are part of the Pleasanton Unified School District. Pleasanton USD formed in 1988 when the school districts of Pleasanton and Dublin unified along city lines. A very small portion of Pleasanton lies in the Livermore Valley Joint Unified School District.

Pleasanton's two comprehensive high schools, Amador Valley and Foothill, are ranked by Niche among the top 200 public high schools in the nation. Pleasanton also has a continuation high school, Village High School. As of 2024, the district also contained Thomas S. Hart Middle School, Pleasanton Middle School and Harvest Park Middle School along with nine elementary schools, one preschool, and an adult education program.

== Media ==
The Pleasanton Weekly is a local newspaper. Tri-Valley Community Television operates their sole station in Pleasanton.

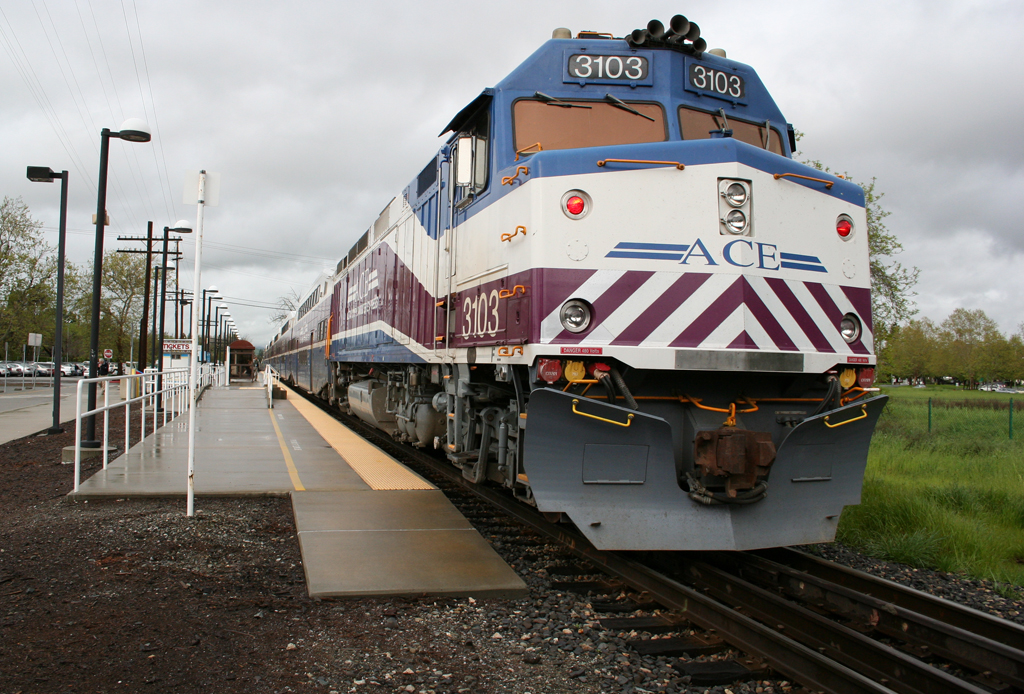
The Altamont Commuter Express train leaving Pleasanton station in the afternoon

== Transportation ==
=== Roads ===
Pleasanton is situated at the crossroads of two major Interstate Highways, I-580 and I-680, which mirror the historic cross-routes of Native American tribes who used the precursor paths as major trading routes. This fact was first discovered with the excavations for Hacienda Business Park, revealing significant tribal artifacts and human skeletal remains.

=== Public transit ===
The city is served by two stations on the Bay Area Rapid Transit (BART) heavy rail system's Blue Line, which runs along the northern boundary of the city:

- Dublin/Pleasanton station, the eastern terminus.
- West Dublin/Pleasanton station, located just west of the I-680 interchange by the Stoneridge Shopping Center.

The Altamont Corridor Express rail service stops near Pleasanton's downtown at Pleasanton Station.

Wheels is the primary provider of bus service in Pleasanton with numerous routes in the city, and connects Pleasanton to Livermore and Dublin.

Express routes from Pleasanton station and Dublin/Pleasanton station to San Ramon and Walnut Creek are provided by County Connection.

=== Airports ===
Pleasanton's closest airport is Livermore Municipal Airport, which is primarily used for general aviation and charter flights; there is no regularly scheduled commercial service. The closest commercial airports are San Jose International Airport, which is reachable by the Altamont Corridor Express, and Oakland International Airport, which can be reached directly through BART. The majority of international flights serving the region operate from San Francisco International Airport, also accessible via BART.

== Notable people ==
People from Pleasanton include:

- Scott Adams, cartoonist, creator of Dilbert
- Jacob Akanyirige, soccer player
- Jason Annicchero, soccer player
- Brandon Crawford, professional baseball player for the San Francisco Giants
- Paula Creamer, professional golfer
- Mason Filippi, NASCAR driver
- TJ Friedl, professional baseball player
- David Garibaldi, professional drummer with Tower of Power, 2012 Percussive Arts Society Hall of Fame Inductee, author of numerous drum instructional books, CDs and DVDs
- Peter Gassner, billionaire and co-founder of Veeva Systems
- Edwin Hawkins, gospel musician, pianist, choir master, composer and arranger
- Phoebe Hearst, philanthropist, feminist and suffragist, mother of William Randolph Hearst
- Jay Howell, illustrator, cartoonist, animator, and artist
- Walter S. Johnson, businessman and philanthropist
- Randal J. Kirk, businessman
- Joel Kribel, professional golfer
- John Madden, football coach and sportscaster
- Sean Mannion, former quarterback for the Los Angeles Rams
- Abby Martin, journalist and host of Breaking the Set
- Keith Millard, former NFL defensive tackle
- Jerry McNerney, US Congressman
- William E. Moerner, 2014 Nobel Prize laureate in chemistry
- Jim Perry, game show host, specifically for game shows Card Sharks and Sale of the Century
- Scott Perry, professional football player
- Stephen Piscotty, professional baseball player for the Oakland Athletics
- Dennis Richmond, former news anchor for KTVU
- Ryan Roxie, Singer/songwriter and guitarist for Alice Cooper, Casablanca and Slash's Snakepit.
- Tamriko Siprashvili, prize-winning international concert pianist, recording artist, instructor
- Ellen Tauscher, former Congresswoman for California's 10th congressional district
- Donna Theodore, singer and actress
- Gabrielle Union, film and television actress
- Ben Wooldridge, professional football quarterback for the New England Patriots
- David Yost, Mighty Morphin Power Rangers actor.

== Sister cities ==
- Blairgowrie and Rattray, Scotland
- Fergus, Ontario, Canada
- Tulancingo, Mexico

== See also ==
- Bernal Subbasin
- Livermore-Pleasanton Fire Department
- Pleasanton Fault
- Pleasanton Public Library
