= Rancho Valle de San José =

Mexican land grant in California

Coordinates: 37.610°N 121.820°W

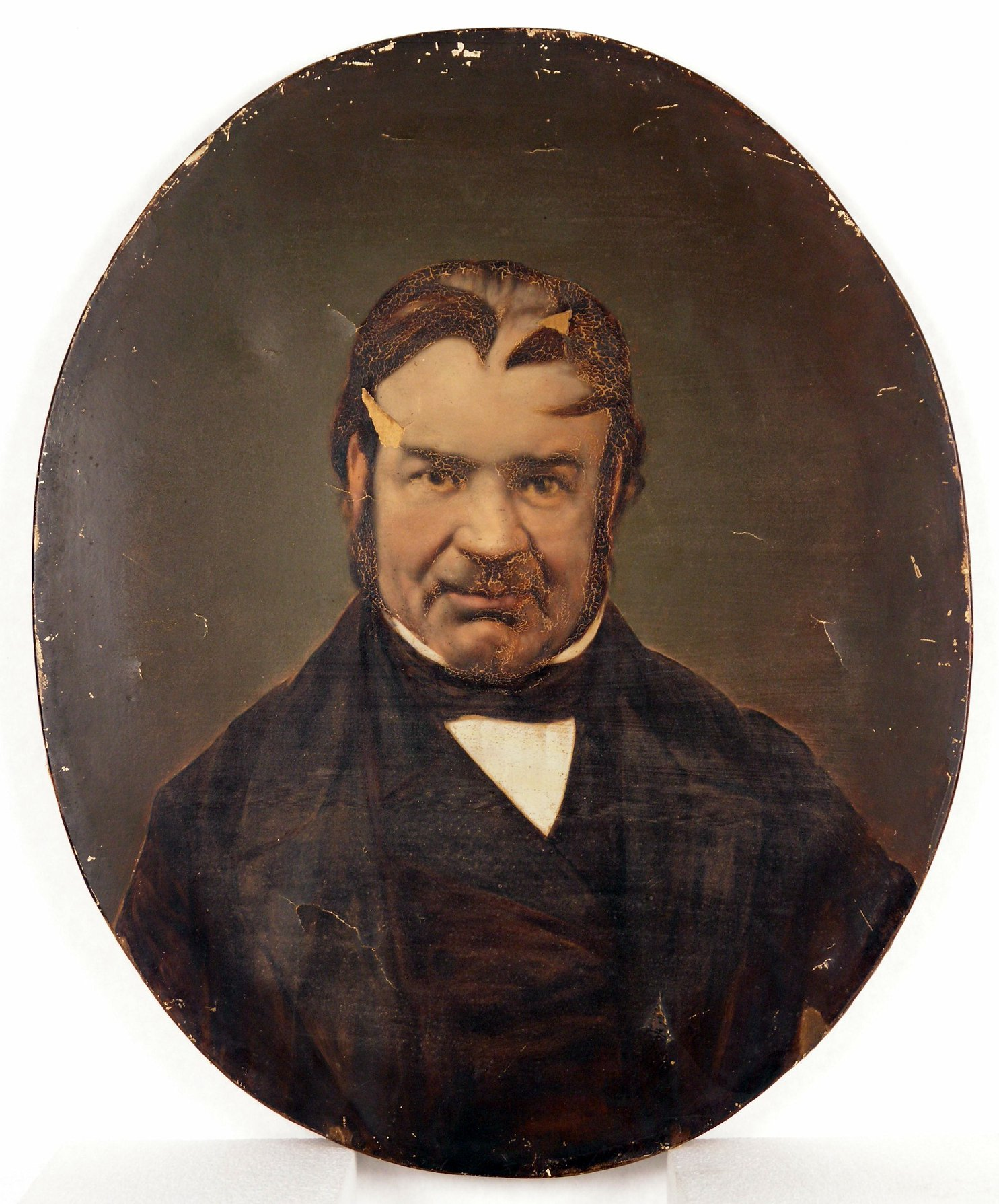
Don Antonio Suñol, one of the grantees of Rancho Valle de San José in 1839.

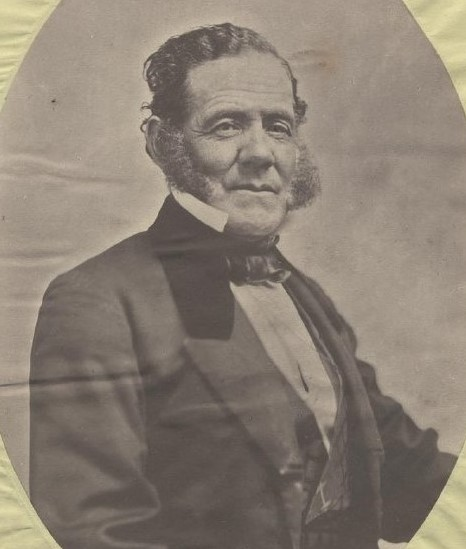
Antonio María Pico, another of the grantees and brother-in-law of Suñol.

Rancho Valle de San José (also called "El Valle" and "Valle de San José y Corralitos") was a 48,436-acre (196.01 km^{2}) Mexican land grant in present-day Alameda County, California. The grant encompassed present-day Sunol and Pleasanton.

== History ==
Rancho Valle de San Jose was initially used by Mission San José as part of the mission's rancho known by the same name, a grazing ranch that covered most of the Amador Valley. In July 1834, Antonio Maria Pico, Agustin and Juan Bernal, and Maria Dolores Bemal (being the Mexican wife of the Spaniard Antonio Suñol) requested land from Governor José María Figueroa. The amount of land was unstated but their attached Diseno showed the entire westerly ten miles of valley floor; being about three square leagues of land for each family. Fr. José González Rubio objected to this application, declaring the land was necessary “not only for the [mission's] sheep ranch, but also to the land that [the mission's community] need for sowing in dry years, like the present”. The application was suspended following the death of Figueroa but in 1837 Governor Juan Bautista Alvarado looked into the request. This time the mission's administrator, Jose de Jesus Vallejo, objected: "The land petitioned for herein cannot be granted without prejudice to this community as well as regards their sheep rancho". A formal application was re-submitted by the same people in 1839 requesting six square leagues. Instead of a fixed amount of land, Alvarado conceded to them that year land from the south end of the valley to the Tassajara Hills to the north, and east to the Las Positas Hills. The families immediately moved over 1,000 head of cattle on to the land. Pico stated by 1853 the land held over 7,000 head of cattle, plus a number of horses and sheep.

An application for land by four families was unusual, but seems to have been for mutual protection in a remote area. Suñol explained to the Private Lands Commission, “When they first went on the ranch they put up but one house & cultivated land in the same vicinity, in order to keep together for protection against the Indians, who were very hostile. Frequent attacks were made upon them by the Indians & it was necessary to go always armed.”

In 1842, Pico sold his interest to Suñol for “ the sum of one hundred young cows & fifty young steers”. In 1849, Suñol sold this share to Bernal for $2,000. The Bernal's moved to the rancho after the gold rush to protect their interests from squatters. Agustín Bernal moved to his portion of the Rancho and built an adobe in 1850.

In 1852 Antonio Suñol, Agustin Bemal and Juan Bernal filed a petition with the Commission for Ascertaining and Settling Private Land Claims in California for a U. S. Patent, which was approved in 1854 and confirmed by the U. S. District Court in 1856. But the ultimate size and location of a patent for this rancho was substantially different from Alvarado's 1839 concession. The District Court's Decree described the land as being from the foothills on the south of the valley, to the Tassajara Creek; but instead of extending it to the eastern Las Positas Hills, he decreed ownership to extend as far as Las Cuevas (Brushy Peak) to the northeast, an area the owners calculated to be about 18 leagues, or about 80,000 acres. Yet the proposed patent survey prepared by the U. S. Surveyor General was for only 51,542 acres, or about 11.5 leagues. Unfortunately the subsequent grants of rancho Santa Rita also claimed land around the Tassajara while rancho Las Positas blocked any connection to either the Las Positas Hills or Las Cuevas. The proposed survey tried to make up for this loss in acreage by including hill land at the south of the valley, which the owners described as “a large quantity of worthless and barren mountain lands not included on the [1839] map.” A series of revised patent maps and a boundary agreements led to the court finally approving a survey and patent in 1865.

The land was subsequently given to four children of José Joaquín Bernal (1762–1837) and María Josefa Daría Sánchez (1760–1858).

John W. Kottinger (1820–1892), an Austrian immigrant, arrived in California in 1849. He married María del Refugio Angustias Bernal, the daughter of Juan Pablo Bernal, and they were given 4,500 acres (18 km^{2}) from Rancho Valle de San José. Kottinger is one of the founders of Pleasanton, California.

By 1874, the Spring Valley Water Company had bought most of the unwanted mountainous land to the south.

George Hearst purchased part of the rancho in 1886. The Hearsts built Hacienda del Pozo de Verona on the land. After the death of George's wife Phoebe Hearst, the land was sold in 1924.

== Historic sites of the Rancho ==
- Kottinger Adobe Barn. John Kottinger’s 1852 adobe barn is the oldest building in downtown Pleasanton.
