= Carmichael, California =

Census-designated place in California, United States

Carmichael
- Census designated place
- Interactive map of Carmichael
- Location in California Location in the United States
- Coordinates: 38°38′22″N 121°19′17″W
- Country: United States
- State: California
- County: Sacramento

Area
  - Total: 15.57 sq mi (40.32 km^{2})
  - Land: 15.33 sq mi (39.71 km^{2})
  - Water: 0.23 sq mi (0.60 km^{2}) 1.50%
- Elevation: 125 ft (38 m)

Population (2020)
  - Total: 79,793
  - Density: 5,203.7/sq mi (2,009.17/km^{2})
- Time zone: UTC-8 (Pacific)
  - Summer (DST): UTC-7 (PDT)
- ZIP code: 95608
- Area code: 916, 279
- FIPS code: 06-11390
- GNIS feature ID: 277484

Carmichael is a census-designated place (CDP) in Sacramento County, California, United States. It is an unincorporated suburb in the Greater Sacramento metropolitan area. The population was 79,793 at the 2020 census.

== Geography and geology ==
Carmichael is located at 38°38′22″N 121°19′17″W (38.639431, -121.321348). According to the United States Census Bureau, the CDP has an area of 15.57 square miles (40.3 km^{2}), of which 15.33 square miles (39.7 km^{2}) is land and 0.23 square miles (0.60 km^{2}) (1.50%) is water.

== History ==
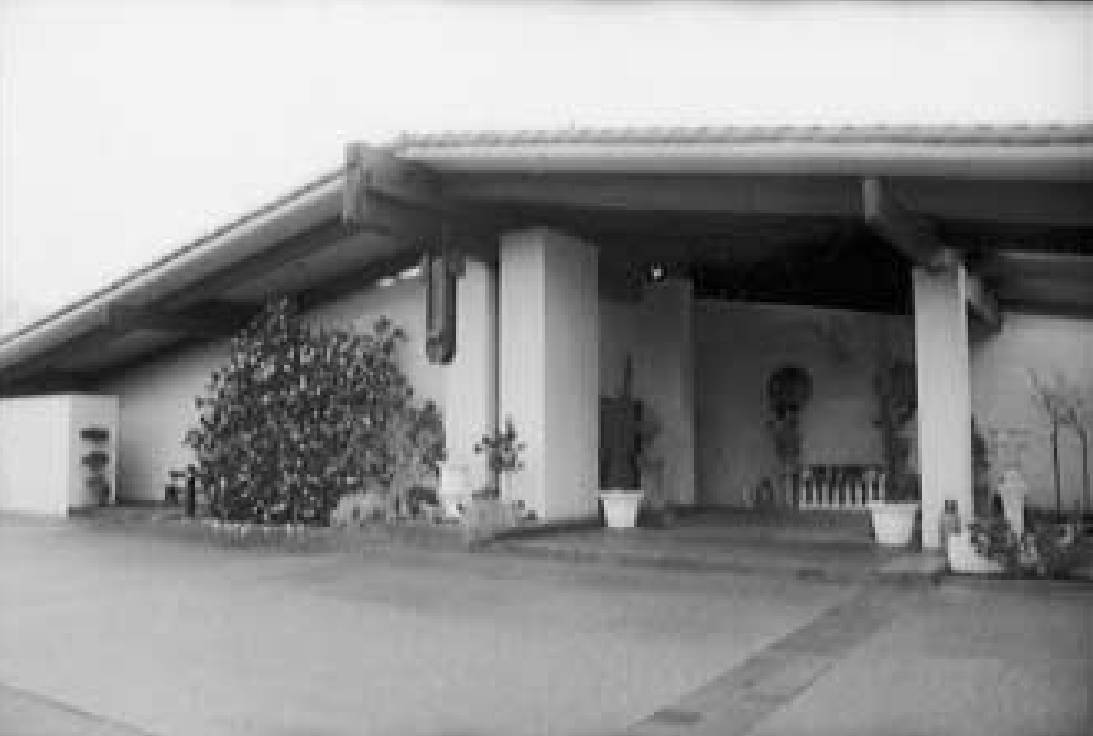
Casa de los Gobernadores was originally built in 1975 as the Governor of California's official residence.

Daniel W. Carmichael (born 1867) came to California in 1885. In 1909, he developed Carmichael Colony No. I, 2,000 acres (8 km^{2}) of what was once part of the Rancho San Juan Mexican land grant. He later bought another 1,000 acres (4 km^{2}), previously part of the Rancho Del Paso Mexican land grant, that he called Carmichael Colony No. 2. It bordered the first colony to the east and Walnut Avenue to the west; the southern boundary was Arden Way with Sutter Avenue to the north.

Casa de los Gobernadores was built in 1974, to serve as the official residence of the Governor of California. However, the residence was never occupied and was sold to private citizens in 1983.

== Demographics ==
Historical population
Census	Pop.	Note	%±
1950	4,499		—
1960	20,455		354.7%
1970	37,625		83.9%
1980	43,108		14.6%
1990	48,702		13.0%
2000	49,742		2.1%
2010	61,762		24.2%
2020	79,793		29.2%
U.S. Decennial Census; 1850–1870 1880-1890; 1900 1910 1920; 1930 1940 1950; 1960 1970 1980; 1990 2000 2010

Carmichael first appeared as an unincorporated community in the 1950 U.S. census; and as a census-designated place in the 1980 United States census.

=== 2020 census ===
As of the 2020 census, Carmichael had a population of 79,793 and a population density of 5,203.7 inhabitants per square mile (2,009.2/km^{2}).

Racial composition as of the 2020 census
Race	Number	Percent
White	53,811	67.4%
Black or African American	4,279	5.4%
American Indian and Alaska Native	739	0.9%
Asian	6,059	7.6%
Native Hawaiian and Other Pacific Islander	407	0.5%
Some other race	4,264	5.3%
Two or more races	10,234	12.8%
Hispanic or Latino (of any race)	11,716	14.7%

The census reported that 98.0% of the population lived in households, 0.8% lived in non-institutionalized group quarters, and 1.2% were institutionalized.

The age distribution was 20.4% under the age of 18, 7.6% aged 18 to 24, 25.8% aged 25 to 44, 24.9% aged 45 to 64, and 21.3% who were 65 years of age or older. The median age was 41.6 years. For every 100 females, there were 91.0 males, and for every 100 females age 18 and over, there were 87.2 males.

There were 32,230 households, of which 27.4% had children under the age of 18 living in them. Of all households, 43.1% were married-couple households, 7.2% were cohabiting couple households, 30.9% had a female householder with no partner present, and 18.8% had a male householder with no partner present. About 29.6% of all households were made up of individuals and 14.4% had someone living alone who was 65 years of age or older, and the average household size was 2.43. There were 20,223 families (62.7% of all households).

There were 33,564 housing units at an average density of 2,188.9 units per square mile (845.1 units/km^{2}), of which 32,230 (96.0%) were occupied. Of the occupied units, 54.3% were owner-occupied and 45.7% were occupied by renters. The homeowner vacancy rate was 0.9% and the rental vacancy rate was 4.1%; overall, 4.0% of units were vacant.

The census reported that 100.0% of residents lived in urban areas and 0.0% lived in rural areas.

=== Income ===
In 2023, the US Census Bureau estimated that the median household income was $84,376, and the per capita income was $47,444. About 7.4% of families and 11.2% of the population were below the poverty line.

=== 2010 census ===
At the 2010 census Carmichael had a population of 61,762. The population density was 4,477.8 inhabitants per square mile (1,728.9/km^{2}). The racial makeup of Carmichael was 49,776 (80.6%) White, 3,972 (5.8%) African American, 546 (0.9%) Native American, 2,653 (4.3%) Asian (0.9% Filipino, 0.9% Chinese, 0.6% Korean, 0.5% Japanese, 0.5% Indian, 0.3% Vietnamese, 0.6% Other), 287 (0.5%) Pacific Islander, 2,035 (3.3%) from other races, and 3,493 (5.7%) from two or more races. There were 7.218 Hispanic or Latino people of any race (11.7%).

The census reported that 60,790 people (98.4% of the population) lived in households, 467 (0.8%) lived in non-institutionalized group quarters, and 505 (0.8%) were institutionalized.

There were 26,036 households, 7,431 (28.5%) had children under the age of 18 living in them, 11,016 (42.3%) were opposite-sex married couples living together, 3,630 (13.9%) had a female householder with no husband present, 1,417 (5.4%) had a male householder with no wife present. There were 1,642 (6.3%) unmarried opposite-sex partnerships, and 229 (0.9%) same-sex married couples or partnerships. 8,080 households (31.0%) were one person and 3,363 (12.9%) had someone living alone who was 65 or older. The average household size was 2.33. There were 16,063 families (61.7% of households); the average family size was 2.91.

The age distribution was 13,060 people (21.1%) under the age of 18, 5,370 people (8.7%) aged 18 to 24, 14,388 people (23.3%) aged 25 to 44, 18,054 people (29.2%) aged 45 to 64, and 10,890 people (17.6%) who were 65 or older. The median age was 42.4 years. For every 100 females, there were 89.6 males. For every 100 females age 18 and over, there were 86.1 males.

There were 28,165 housing units at an average density of 2,042.0 per square mile, of the occupied units 14,472 (55.6%) were owner-occupied and 11,564 (44.4%) were rented. The homeowner vacancy rate was 2.3%; the rental vacancy rate was 9.8%. 34,442 people (55.8% of the population) lived in owner-occupied housing units and 26,348 people (42.7%) lived in rental housing units.

== Government ==
In the California State Legislature, Carmichael is in the 6th Senate District, represented by Republican Roger W. Niello and in 6th Assembly District, represented by Kevin McCarty.

In the United States House of Representatives, Carmichael is in California's 6th Congressional district, represented by Ami Bera.

Law enforcement services are provided by the North Division of the Sacramento County Sheriff's Office

== Education ==
Carmichael is served by one public school district, San Juan Unified.

=== Elementary schools ===
- Albert Schweitzer Elementary
- Cameron Ranch Elementary
- Carmichael Elementary
- Charles Peck Elementary
- Coyle Avenue Elementary
- Del Dayo Elementary
- El Rancho Elementary School, K-8
- Garfield Elementary (no longer exists, became the San Juan pupil enrollment office)
- Mary A. Deterding Elementary
- Mission Avenue Elementary
- Thomas Kelly Elementary
- Sacramento Adventist Academy, K-12
- Starr King K-8
- Victory Christian School, K-12

=== Junior high schools ===
- El Rancho Elementary School, K-8
- John Barrett Middle School
- Our Lady of the Assumption Catholic School, K-8
- St. John the Evangelist Catholic School, K-8
- Starr King Middle School, K-8
- Victory Christian School, K-12
- Winston Churchill Middle School

=== High schools ===
- Del Campo High School
- Sacramento Adventist Academy
- Victory Christian High School

La Sierra High School operated from 1957 to 1983, when it closed due to budget cuts, being selected among several schools in the district due to having the lowest attendance. The site was adapted as La Sierra Community Center in 1985.

Local high school students also attend other nearby schools in the San Juan Unified School District, such as:

- Bella Vista High School in Fair Oaks
- Casa Roble High School in Orangevale
- El Camino Fundamental High School in Arden-Arcade
- Encina High School in Arden-Arcade
- Jesuit High School in Arden-Arcade
- Mesa Verde High School in Citrus Heights
- Mira Loma High School in Arden-Arcade
- San Juan High School in Citrus Heights
- Rio Americano High School in Arden-Arcade

== Points of interest ==
=== Carmichael Park ===
Carmichael Park is a major 38-acre (150,000 m^{2}) park in the town. The park includes five ballfields, six tennis courts, and a nine-hole disc golf course. The Community Clubhouse, Veterans' Memorial Building, the Daniel Bishop Memorial Pavilion for the Performing Arts, and the Great Wall of Carmichael are all within the park. A year-round farmers market is held at the park every Sunday from 9 a.m. to 2 p.m., hosted by the nonprofit BeMoneySmartUSA.

=== Jensen Botanical Gardens ===
The Jensen Botanical Gardens are at 8520 Fair Oaks Boulevard. They exhibit a variety of flora including camellias, dogwoods, azaleas, and rhododendrons.

=== Chautauqua Playhouse ===
The Chautauqua Playhouse has been in the La Sierra Community Center since 1985. The 95-seat theater shows comedies, dramas, and musicals. It has a children's theater with performances held on Saturdays. Chautauqua Playhouse is at 5325 Engle Road (between Walnut Avenue and Fair Oaks Boulevard).

=== Ancil Hoffman Park ===
Ancil Hoffman Park is a major park within the American River Parkway in Carmichael. It is a 396-acre (1.60 km^{2}) park. It features the Effie Yeaw Nature Center. The oak-canopied park is bordered on two sides by the American River. Reconstructed Maidu Indian homes are at the entrance to the nature center. The Ancil Hoffman Golf Course is also part of the park. Many species of animals can be seen, including wild turkey, deer, coyotes and hawks. One can access the park via Fair Oaks Blvd. by following the signs.

=== American River Parkway ===
The American River Parkway is a 32-mile (51 km) parkway that runs along the American River throughout Sacramento County. The parkway connects many smaller parks and numerous boat launching points. It can be accessed by various exits off Highway 50 in Sacramento County.

The American River Parkway is also host to the Great American Triathlon, featuring running, biking, and paddling.

=== American River Bike Trail ===
A portion of the American River Bike Trail crosses Carmichael near the southern community boundary. The bike trail is used by bicycle commuters and for recreational walking, biking, and running.

== Notable person ==
- Jenson Brooksby (2000–), American tennis player
- W. Mark Bassett (1966–2026), American LDS religious leader and business executive
- Ian Hecox and Anthony Padilla, known for founding Smosh, grew up in Carmichael

== See also ==
- Mercy San Juan Medical Center
