= Arden-Arcade, California =

Arden-Arcade
- census-designated place
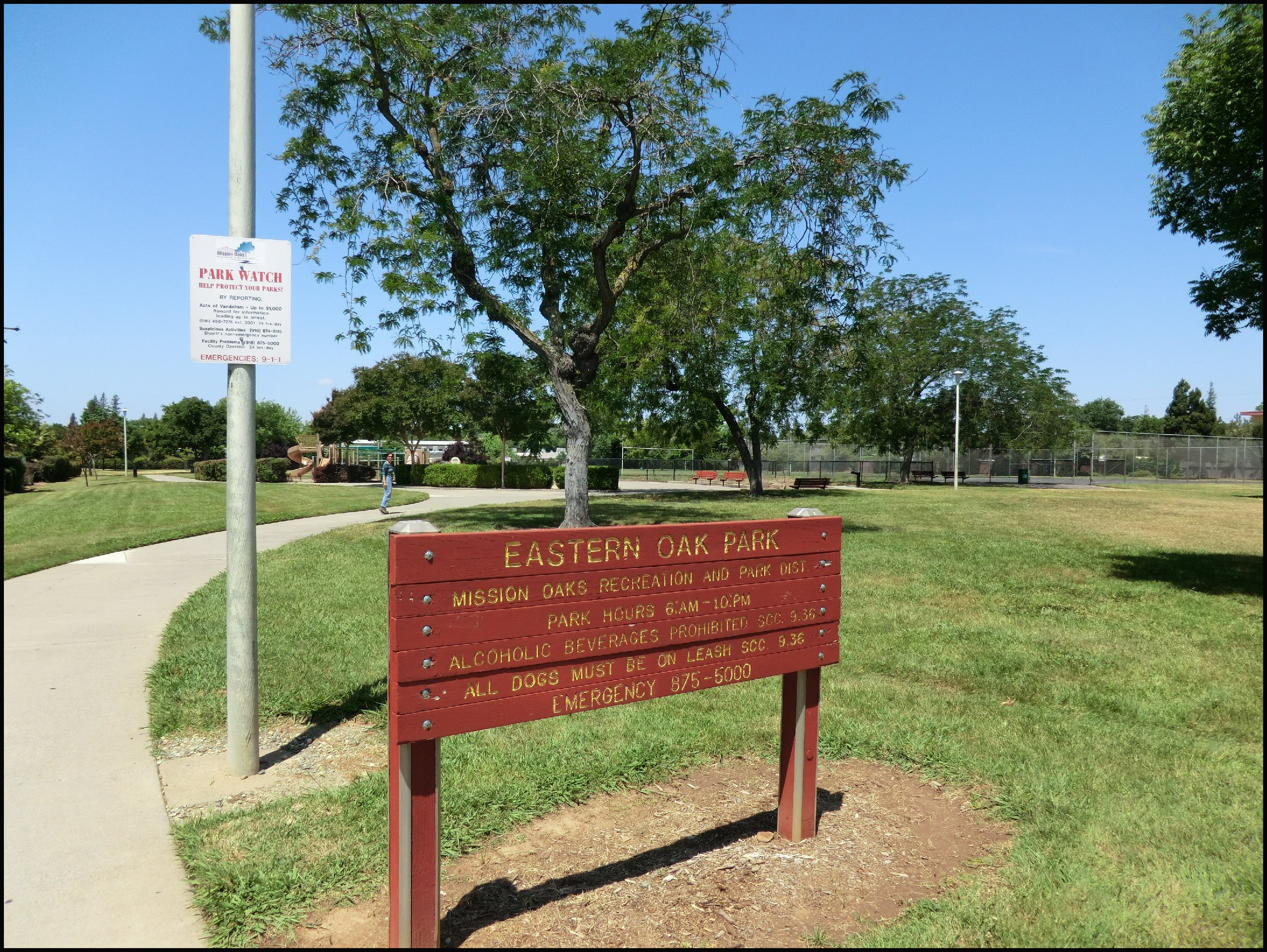
- Eastern Oak Park
- Interactive map of Arden-Arcade
- Location in California Location in the United States
- Coordinates: 38°36′19″N 121°22′47″W
- Country: United States
- State: California
- County: Sacramento

Area
  - Total: 16.13 sq mi (41.77 km^{2})
  - Land: 15.90 sq mi (41.18 km^{2})
  - Water: 0.23 sq mi (0.59 km^{2}) 1.41%
- Elevation: 56 ft (17 m)

Population (2020)
  - Total: 94,659
  - Density: 5,952.9/sq mi (2,298.43/km^{2})
- Time zone: UTC-8 (PST)
  - Summer (DST): UTC-7 (PDT)
- ZIP code(s): 95821, 95825, 95864
- Area codes: 916, 279
- FIPS code: 06-02553

Arden-Arcade is a census-designated place (CDP) in Sacramento County, California, United States. The population was 94,659 at the 2020 census, making it the second most populous census-designated place in California. It is east of the city of Sacramento and west of the community of Carmichael.

Arden-Arcade is a principal locality of the Sacramento metropolitan area.

== History ==
The first residents of what would become the Arden-Arcade area were the Valley Nisenan, an indigenous people of the horizon period with their own language, culture, and social order.The Valley Nisenan in the Arden Arcade region date back 11,000 years. Their community village in Arden Arcade was Kadema, near Watt Avenue and the American River.

The land after colonization was first part of a Mexican land grant, then deeded to John Sutter, Sacramento. The Rancho del Paso grant was negotiated from the Mexican governor by Sutter. On August 10, 1843 Sutter then deeded the Rancho Del Paso to Eliab and Hiram Grimes and John Sinclair. Samuel Norris was the next owner of Rancho del Paso, then James Haggin. From 1862 to 1905, James Ben Ali Haggin owned the Rancho, where he became known for breeding race horses. One of the horses bred on the Rancho, Ben Ali, won the 12th Kentucky Derby in world record time 1886. To ship his horses, Haggin built a railroad spur from his northern paddocks (approximately where today's Hagginwood Golf Course is) toward the current Union Pacific railroad tracks, northeast of the present-day Capital City Freeway along the beginnings of Arcade Boulevard. On that site, Haggin's staff built 24 barns with 64 stalls each plus some outbuildings. It was there that he would ship his horses mostly to Kentucky, some eventually shipping around the world.

“Arden" most likely comes from the fact that Orlando Robertson, the owner of the Rancho and a developer after Haggin, was originally from Arden Hills, Minnesota. As for “Arcade,” Haggin had located the headquarters alongside the major creek that ran through the Rancho (now off Arcade Boulevard, in the South Hagginwood neighborhood of Northern Sacramento). The creek's name derives from the "arcade" of tree limbs belonging to a string of shade-giving native oak trees over the waterway. The remnants of the majestic trees can still be seen though some are dead stumps. (In architecture, an arcade is a number of arches supporting a wall.)

Orlando Robertson was a land speculator who came to Sacramento after he heard about the exceptional lands of the Rancho Del Paso. He bought the Rancho in 1905 for $1.5 million for his Sacramento Colonization Company and laid out the streets and developed the tracts for sale. Robertson chose street names that reflected the inventors of the period: Watt, Edison, Howe, Bell, and so on.

By 1916, given the fertile soil and excellent supply of water, Robertson sold the tracts to farming families, many of them Scandinavian immigrants newly off the boat Scandinavian. In fact, the area around Gibbons Park was known as “Little Norway” because so many Norwegian families settled there. Arden-Arcade and neighboring Carmichael were advertised as excellent areas for growing citrus, but olives, nuts and stone fruit were also farmed here. At one time, Arden-Arcade was the hop-growing region of the world.

Among the oldest surviving buildings in the area are the Arden Middle School, built in 1914, and the Del Paso Country Club, from 1919, named for the original Rancho on which it was built. The first residential neighborhoods in the area were constructed in the 1920s and the 1930s, as the city developed over the river, but the real building boom came at the end of World War II.

However, the real current face of Arden-Arcade was built between 1945 and 1970 and represents a middle-class mid-century modern community. There are also large custom-built developments dotted with homes and office complexes. Arden-Arcade features multiple googie architectural structures as well.

== Geography ==
Arden-Arcade is located at 38°36′19″N 121°22′47″W (38.605154, -121.379750).

According to the United States Census Bureau, the CDP has a total area of 16.1 square miles (42 km^{2}), of which 15.9 square miles (41 km^{2}) is land and 0.2 square miles (0.5 km^{2}) (1.41%) is water.

=== Boundaries ===
Arden-Arcade's northern border is formed by Auburn Boulevard and Arcade Creek, its southern border is primarily the American River, its western border is Ethan Way and its eastern border is formed by Walnut Avenue, Cypress Avenue, and Mission Avenue.

== Community ==
=== Transportation ===
Arden-Arcade is served by three major highways. Interstate 80 and the Capital City Freeway are just north of the community and just to the south of the American River (the community's southern border) is U.S. Route 50. Major east-west thoroughfares include El Camino Avenue, Marconi Avenue, Arden Way, Alta Arden Expressway, and Fair Oaks Boulevard. Major north-south thoroughfares include Fulton Avenue, Watt Avenue, Howe Avenue, and Eastern Avenue.

Many of the major arterial streets that criss-cross through Arden-Arcade are named for the major inventors of the Industrial Revolution. It is assumed they were named around 1915 by Orlando Robertson, the main property owner of the historic Rancho Del Paso at the time. The street names appear as the following in the archives immediately after this time:

- Watt Avenue (James Watt - steam engine)
- Howe Avenue (Elias Howe - sewing machine)
- Whitney Avenue (Eli Whitney - cotton gin)
- Edison Avenue (Thomas Edison - light bulb)
- Marconi Avenue (Guglielmo Marconi - radio)
- Fulton Avenue (Robert Fulton - steamboat)
- Morse Avenue (Samuel Morse - telegraph)
- Bell Street (Alexander Graham Bell - telephone)

=== Schools ===
- St. Philomene Catholic School (K-8)

==== High schools ====
- Encina Preparatory High School (1958)
- Sacramento Country Day School
- Mira Loma High School (1960)
- El Camino Fundamental High School (1950)
- Rio Americano High School (1963)
- Jesuit High School (1963)

Loretto High School, which opened in 1955 and closed after the 2008–2009 school year, was located in Arden-Arcade. It is now operated as an elementary through high school run by Aspire Public Schools.

=== Housing ===
Arden-Arcade is one of the most economically and ethnically diverse communities in the Sacramento region. There are neighborhoods along the American River and the American River Parkway with million-dollar homes, including Wilhaggin, Sierra Oaks, Sierra Oaks Vista, Arden Park, Arden Oaks, and areas surrounding the Del Paso Country Club. There are also mid century neighborhoods that encompass the majority of Arden Arcade. Most if not all of these community neighborhoods were built immediately after World War II, some by award-winning architects and developers, Jere Strizek, Streng Brothers and Randolph Parks. Other community wide buildings of note are mid-century modern designed businesses, including the 1961 Country Club Lanes (Powers, Daley and DeRosa), Sam's Hof Brau (one of the few remaining original German Hof Brau Deli's still in operation), the AT&T building (Hertzka and Knowels architects 1963), an original IHOP restaurant building (Nims and Koch architects 1963 — now Guaribaldi's), Weinstocks Lubin (Charles Luckman 1961) at Country Club Plaza, Emigh Hardware, and many more. Modern Arden Arcade was completely built out between the years 1945–1965, the prime mid century period in architecture. El Camino and Watt Avenues, where these buildings reside today, were commonly referred to by the community as Downtown Arden Arcade, and in many respects, remains so even today.

A new California governor's mansion built for Ronald Reagan was in Arden-Arcade in 1984 and was sold in 2004 and is a private residence. Governors George Deukmejian, Pete Wilson, and Gray Davis each occupied the house on Lake Wilhaggin Drive in the Wilhaggin area. The house was sold in 2004 after Governor Arnold Schwarzenegger decided not to live there and instead occupied the penthouse at the Hyatt Hotel in Downtown Sacramento when he did not commute back to Brentwood, which he did most nights.

== Government ==
=== Local ===
==== Incorporation plans ====
On November 2, 2010, area residents voted on Measure D. The measure was defeated by a margin of 76% to 24%. If approved, the area bounded by Auburn Boulevard on the north, the American River Drive, Ethan Way on the west, and Mission Avenue/Jacob Lane on the east would have become the City of Arden-Arcade. Proponents claimed that the new city would have improved services and created community pride in the City of Arden-Arcade without any new taxes. Opponents believed that revenue assumptions were risky and, if wrong, could lead to higher taxes.

==== Sacramento annexation study ====
As of August 24, 2010, the City of Sacramento posted on their website that they have no plans to annex Arden-Arcade.. Only the Local Area Formation Commission (LAFCo) has the regulatory authority under state law to approve or disapprove of the annexation of territory by a city (Cortese-Knox-Hertzberg Act of 2000, California Government Code Section 56000). LAFCo requires cities to keep up their general plan and look at overlapping jurisdictions. In that context, the City of Sacramento has collected information about Arden-Arcade but has not taken any steps toward incorporation, the first of which would be identifying Arden-Arcade as within its sphere of influence.

The City of Sacramento's last annexation of an inhabited area, College Greens, was in the late 1950s. While it discussed interest in Arden-Arcade in the 1960s, the City of Sacramento did not initiate formal steps toward incorporation.

In its analysis of the area as part of its general plan update, city staff noted that Arden-Arcade is "mostly built out" (see Part III of the General Plan, Community Plan and Special Study Areas, Arden-Arcade Community Plan, p. 3-AA-5 at http://www.sacgp.org/). The city has also noted that the area has significant infrastructure needs and the likelihood of community opposition to incorporation.

==== Arden-Arcade Community Planning Council ====
The Arden-Arcade Community Planning Council is a nine-member council that helps make decisions for the community of Arden-Arcade. These nine members are appointed by the Sacramento County Board of Supervisors.

==== Chamber of Commerce ====
The North Sacramento Chamber of Commerce, Greater Arden Chamber of Commerce, and Metro Chamber Arden Arcade Council all serve the business community of Arden-Arcade.

=== State and federal ===
In the California State Legislature, Arden-Arcade is in the 6th senatorial district, represented by Republican Roger Niello, and the 6th Assembly district, represented by Democrat Maggy Krell.

In the United States House of Representatives, Arden-Arcade is in the 6th congressional district.

== Demographics ==
Historical population
Census	Pop.	Note	%±
1960	73,352		—
1970	82,492		12.5%
1980	87,570		6.2%
1990	92,040		5.1%
2000	96,025		4.3%
2010	92,186		−4.0%
2020	94,659		2.7%
U.S. Decennial Census; 1860–1870 1880-1890; 1900 1910 1920; 1930 1940 1950; 1960 1970 1980; 1990 2000 2010

Arden-Arcade first appeared as an unincorporated community in the 1960 U.S. census; and as a census-designated place in the 1980 United States census.

=== Racial and ethnic composition ===
Arden-Arcade CDP, California – Racial and ethnic composition Note: the US Census treats Hispanic/Latino as an ethnic category. This table excludes Latinos from the racial categories and assigns them to a separate category. Hispanics/Latinos may be of any race.
Race / Ethnicity (NH = Non-Hispanic)	Pop 2000	Pop 2010	Pop 2020	% 2000	% 2010	% 2020
White alone (NH)	69,620	57,529	47,193	72.50%	62.41%	49.86%
Black or African American alone (NH)	5,541	7,527	8,498	5.77%	8.17%	8.98%
Native American or Alaska Native alone (NH)	678	584	428	0.71%	0.63%	0.45%
Asian alone (NH)	4,569	4,990	11,043	4.76%	5.41%	11.67%
Native Hawaiian or Pacific Islander alone (NH)	380	491	581	0.40%	0.53%	0.61%
Other race alone (NH)	235	226	606	0.24%	0.25%	0.64%
Mixed race or Multiracial (NH)	3,501	3,692	7,789	3.65%	4.00%	8.23%
Hispanic or Latino (any race)	11,501	17,147	18,521	11.98%	18.60%	19.57%
Total	96,025	92,186	94,659	100.00%	100.00%	100.00%

=== 2020 census ===
As of the 2020 census, Arden-Arcade had a population of 94,659 and a population density of 5,953.0 inhabitants per square mile (2,298.5/km^{2}). The census reported that 98.5% of residents lived in households, 0.8% lived in non-institutionalized group quarters, and 0.7% were institutionalized. 100.0% of residents lived in urban areas, while 0.0% lived in rural areas.

Residents were 23.0% under the age of 18, 8.5% aged 18 to 24, 29.0% aged 25 to 44, 22.7% aged 45 to 64, and 16.9% were 65 years of age or older; the median age was 36.5 years. For every 100 females there were 92.9 males, and for every 100 females age 18 and over there were 90.1 males age 18 and over.

There were 38,845 households, of which 28.7% had children under the age of 18 living in them. Of all households, 37.4% were married-couple households, 8.5% were cohabiting couple households, 32.5% had a female householder with no partner present, and 21.6% had a male householder with no partner present. About 32.2% of all households were made up of individuals, and 13.3% had someone living alone who was 65 years of age or older. The average household size was 2.40. There were 22,602 families (58.2% of all households).

There were 40,693 housing units at an average density of 2,559.1 units per square mile (988.1 units/km^{2}), of which 38,845 (95.5%) were occupied. Of these, 42.8% were owner-occupied, and 57.2% were occupied by renters. The homeowner vacancy rate was 1.2% and the rental vacancy rate was 4.3%.

Racial composition as of the 2020 census
Race	Number	Percent
White	50,767	53.6%
Black or African American	8,967	9.5%
American Indian and Alaska Native	997	1.1%
Asian	11,244	11.9%
Native Hawaiian and Other Pacific Islander	633	0.7%
Some other race	8,345	8.8%
Two or more races	13,706	14.5%
Hispanic or Latino (of any race)	18,521	19.6%

=== 2023 American Community Survey ===
In 2023, the US Census Bureau estimated that 20.6% of the population were foreign-born. Of all people aged 5 or older, 71.2% spoke only English at home, 10.9% spoke Spanish, 12.2% spoke other Indo-European languages, 3.8% spoke Asian or Pacific Islander languages, and 1.8% spoke other languages. Of those aged 25 or older, 88.7% were high school graduates and 36.4% had a bachelor's degree.

The median household income was $71,767, and the per capita income was $43,815. About 14.2% of families and 18.5% of the population were below the poverty line.
