= Governor's Mansion State Historic Park =

Historic house in California, United States

- California Governor's Mansion
- U.S. National Register of Historic Places
- California Historical Landmark
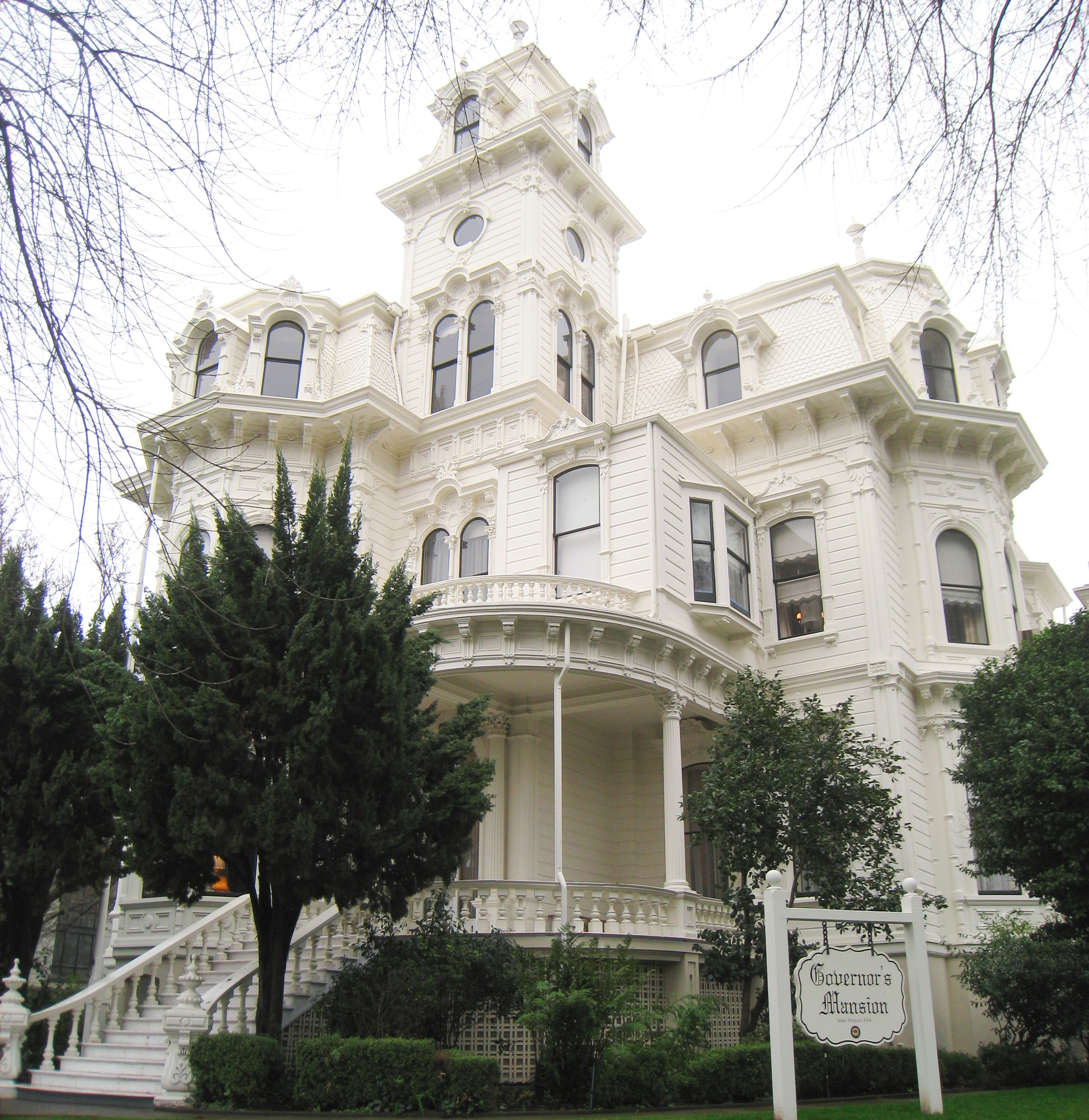

- Location within Sacramento, California Location within California Location within the United States
- Location: 1526 H St, Sacramento, California
- Coordinates: 38°34′48″N 121°29′05″W
- Built: 1877
- Architect: Nathaniel D. Goodell
- Architectural style: Second Empire-Italianate
- NRHP reference No.: 70000139
- CHISL No.: 823

Significant dates
- Added to NRHP: November 10, 1970
- Designated CHISL: August 10, 1974

The California Governor's Mansion is the official residence of the governor of California, located in Sacramento, the capital of California. Built in 1877, the estate was purchased by the State of California in 1903 and has served as the executive residence for 14 governors. The mansion was occupied by governors between 1903–1967 and 2015–2019. Since 1967, the mansion has been managed by California State Parks as the Governor's Mansion State Historic Park.

== History ==
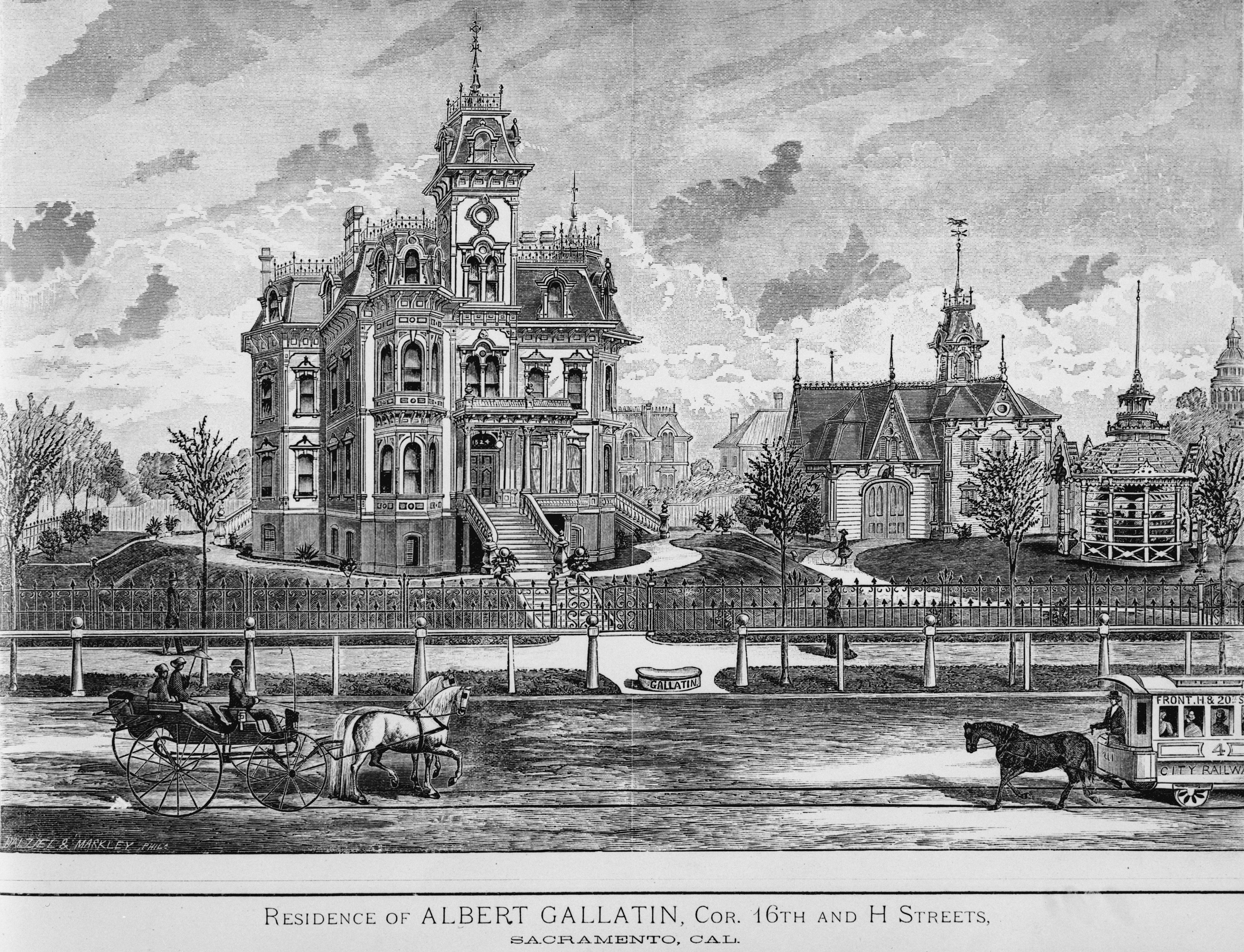
A depiction of the mansion in 1880

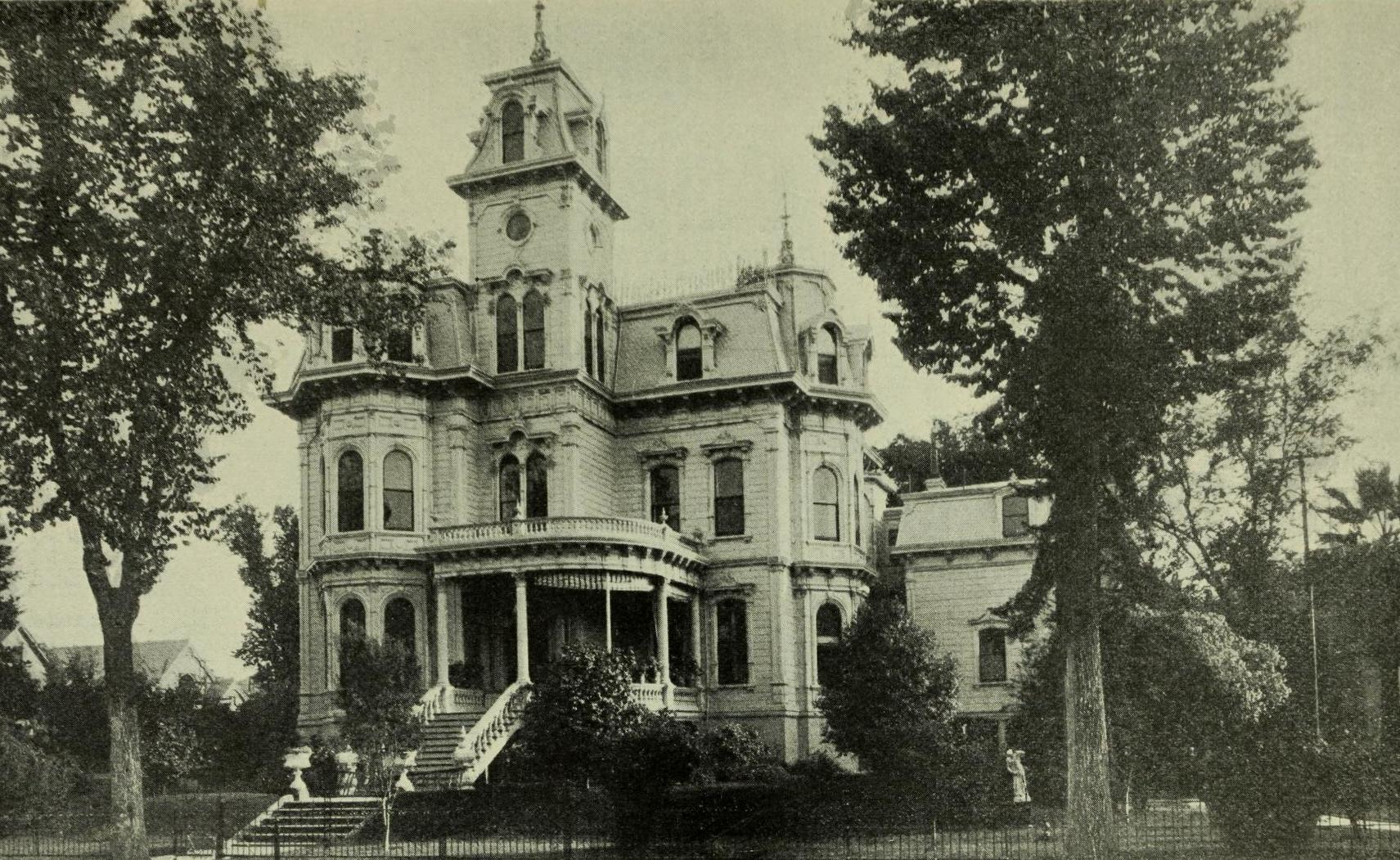
The Governor's Mansion in 1907

The thirty-room, three-story Second Empire-Italianate Victorian mansion was built in 1877 for local hardware merchant Albert Gallatin, who sold it to businessman Joseph Steffens, the father of journalist Lincoln Steffens, in 1887. In 1903, the State of California purchased the house to serve as the governor's mansion.

Many furnishings remain from former governors, including George C. Pardee's 1902 Steinway piano, velvet chairs, and sofas belonging to Governor Hiram Johnson, and Persian rugs bought by the wife of Earl Warren.

=== State park ===
In 1967, ownership of the mansion was transferred from the Governor of California to California State Parks, establishing the Governor's Mansion State Historic Park. Governor Reagan lived in the mansion for a few months while making arrangements for his own residence. He leased a home in East Sacramento's "Fabulous 40s" neighborhood at 1341 45th Street. Reagan set a precedent that was adopted by all subsequent California governors until 2015.

In 1970, the mansion was designated as a "historic house museum" and opened to the public.

From 1974 to 1975, during Reagan's tenure, a new executive mansion was constructed, Casa de los Gobernadores, in Carmichael, a suburb of Sacramento. Reagan never resided in the mansion, as it was completed after his tenure as governor ended, and the mansion was subsequently sold by Jerry Brown, Reagan's successor. Brown, during his first two terms as governor from 1975 to 1983, lived in a sparsely-furnished two-bedroom apartment at the Dean Apartments at 1400 N St.

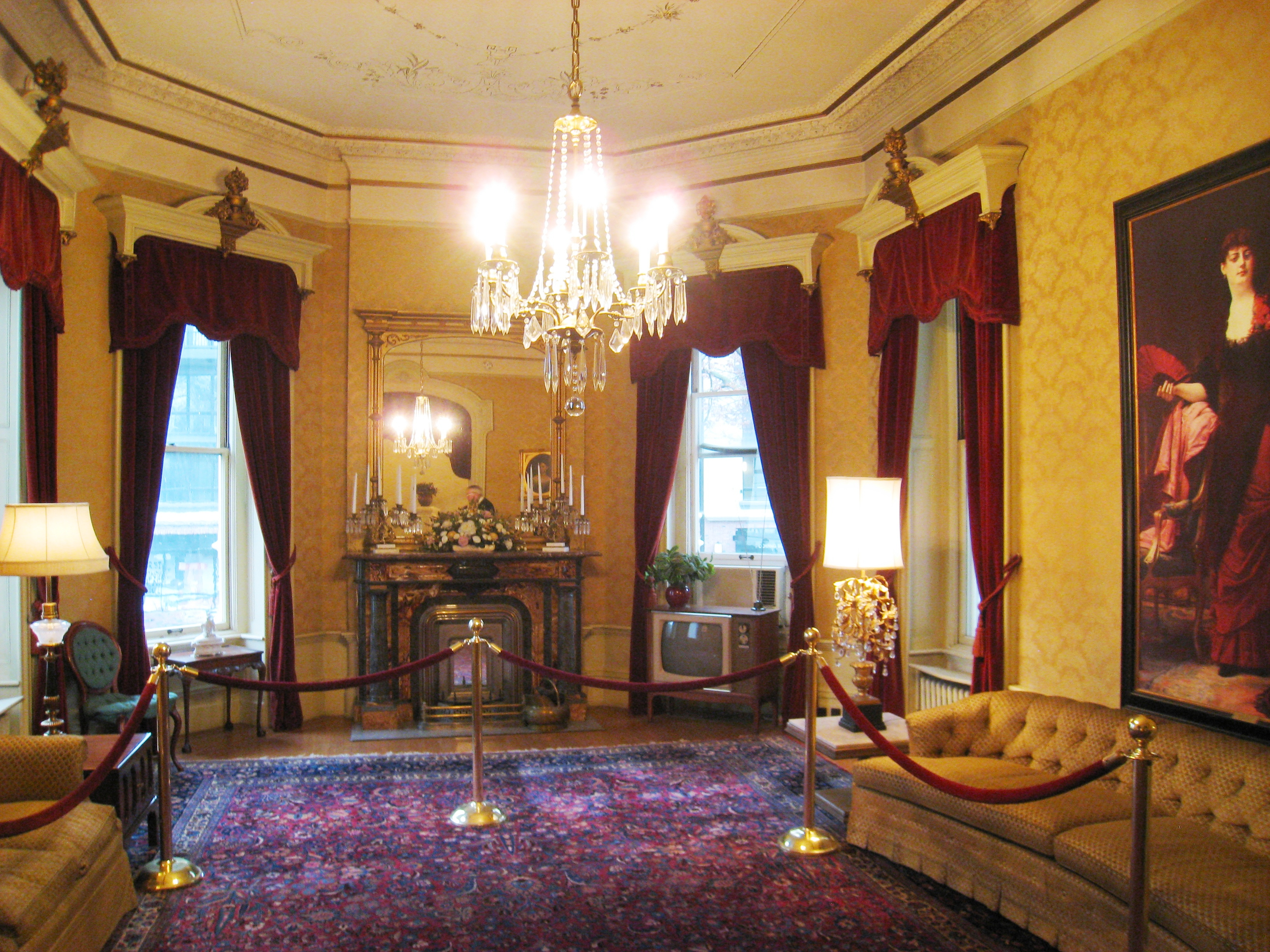
A drawing room in the mansion

Governors George Deukmejian, Pete Wilson, and Gray Davis lived (successively) in an east Sacramento residence bought by Deukmejian and later leased by the state. Governor Arnold Schwarzenegger ordinarily commuted each day by private plane from his home in the Brentwood area of Los Angeles. When he would need to stay in Sacramento overnight, he would take a hotel suite at the Hyatt Regency Sacramento across the street from the California State Capitol.

When Brown became governor again in 2011, he opted to live in a 1,450-square-foot (135 m^{2}) downtown loft.

In July 2012, the Governor's Mansion was one of 70 California State Parks proposed for closure as part of a deficit reduction program. Previously, it was also one of several state parks threatened with closure in 2008. These threatened closures were ultimately avoided by cutting hours and maintenance system-wide.

=== Renewed executive residence ===
In 2015, the mansion once again became the official residence of the governor of California as well as being a museum, when Governor Jerry Brown and his wife, Anne Gust Brown, moved into the governor's mansion after it underwent $4.1 million in renovations to update electrical and plumbing systems, as well as to remove lead-based paint and install a fire sprinkler system and other security features.

In 2019, Governor Gavin Newsom and his family lived briefly in the mansion before taking up residence in a house purchased in the Sacramento suburb of Fair Oaks.

== Stanford Mansion ==
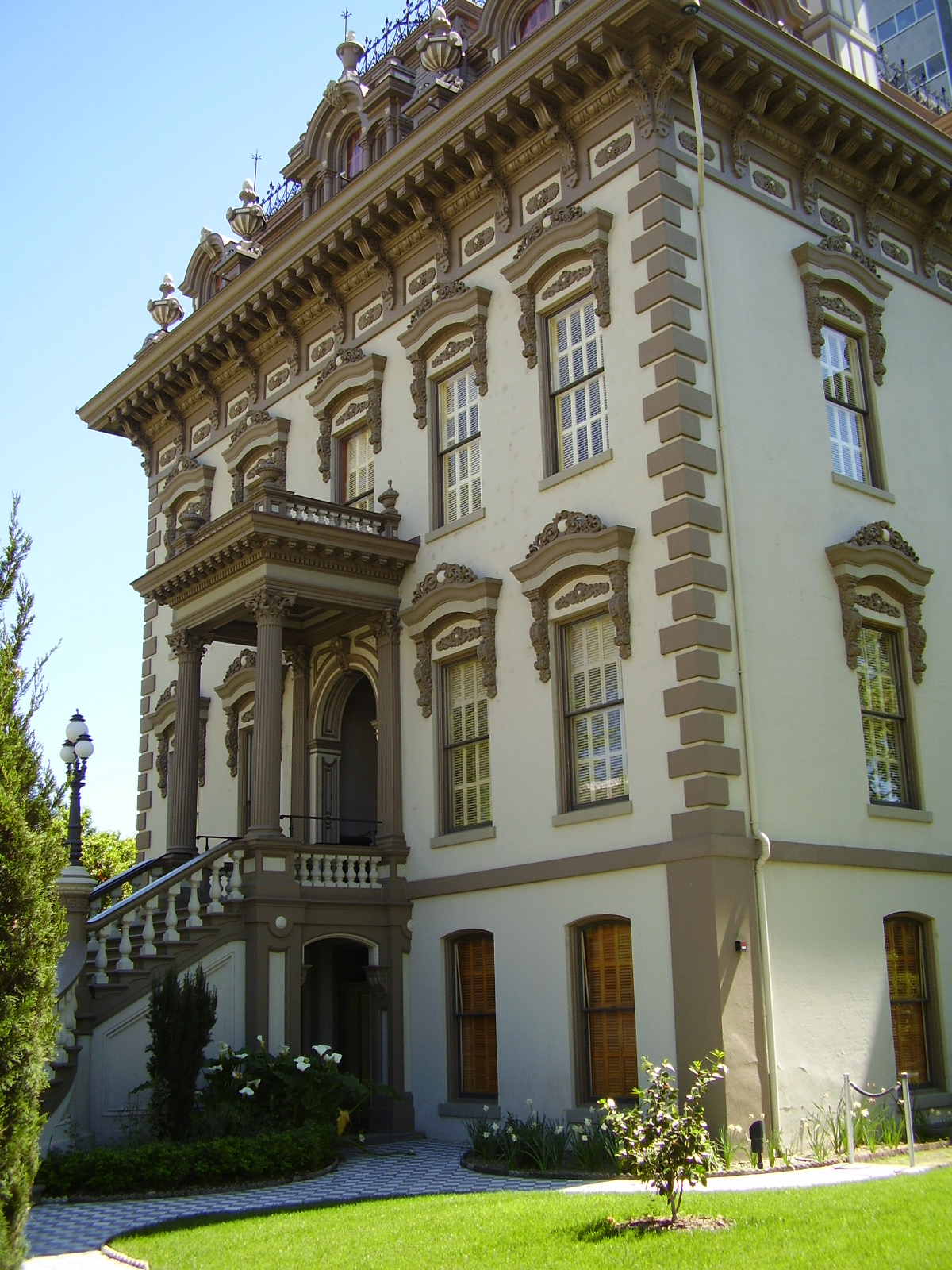
The Leland Stanford Mansion is also used by the Governor of California for official purposes, including the reception of foreign dignitaries.

The Leland Stanford Mansion, the former residence of Leland Stanford (8th Governor of California and founder of Stanford University), serves as the official reception house for the State of California. It is often used by the governor for official receptions of foreign dignitaries and for ceremonial purposes.

The Stanford Mansion also hosts an official office and working space for the governor.

== Casa de los Gobernadores ==
Casa de los Gobernadores was built in 1974–75, in the Sacramento suburb of Carmichael, to serve as the new official residence of the governor. Reagan never resided in this new governor's mansion as it was completed after his term ended. Jerry Brown, who succeeded Reagan, refused to live in the mansion. In 1982, it was sold by the state and is now a private residence.

== See also ==
- Governor of California
- Stanford Mansion
- History of Sacramento, California
- National Register of Historic Places listings in Sacramento County, California
- California Historical Landmarks in Sacramento County, California
- Casa de los Gobernadores
