= Loretto High School =

Location
- 2360 El Camino Avenue; Sacramento, California 95821; United States

Information
- Type: Private, All-Female
- Religious affiliation: Roman Catholic
- Founded: 1955
- Closed: 2009
- Grades: 9-12
- Language: English; others offered: French, Spanish, Greek
- Hours in school day: 7
- Campus: Closed
- Campus size: Small
- Colors: Navy, White, and Forest Green
- Slogan: One World, One Light
- Song: Alma Mater
- Fight song: "Loretto Alma Mater"
- Athletics: 11 sports
- Mascot: Lions
- Accreditation: Western Association of Schools and Colleges
- Tuition: $15,000/year

For Loretto High School in Louisville, Kentucky see Basil Doerhoefer House

Loretto High School was a small, Roman Catholic, college-preparatory school for young women in Sacramento, California. Although located in the Roman Catholic Diocese of Sacramento the school was independent of the diocese. In 2005, Loretto High School celebrated its 50th anniversary. In June 2009, the school closed. Many students transferred to coed Christian Brothers and fellow all-girls St. Francis High School to complete their high school education, while others decided to go to public schools such as Mira Loma High School or El Camino Fundamental High School.

== Location ==
The school was founded by the Institute of the Blessed Virgin Mary in 1955. The campus was located at a 5-acre (20,000 m^{2}) plot between El Camino Avenue near Bell Street in Sacramento California.

== Education ==
Admission to Loretto High School was selective and based on the student's previous school record, placement test, interview, recommendation, and application. Once accepted, freshmen immediately entered the challenging curriculum. In the 1970's Loretto operated on a trimester system, rather than a semester system.

=== AP/Honors Courses ===
English and Literature: AP English Language and Composition, AP English Literature and Composition, Shakespeare Honors (1 trimester), The Poem Honors (1 trimester), The Novel Honors (1 trimester)

Foreign Language: AP French Language, Spanish 3 Honors, AP Spanish Language

Mathematics: Pre-Calculus Honors, AP Calculus AB, AP Calculus BC

Science: Chemistry 2 Honors, Biology 2 Honors, Physics Honors

Social Studies: AP US History, Government/Economics Honors, AP World History

Philosophy: Honors Philosophy I - Western Traditions, Honors Philosophy II - Eastern Traditions

Theology: Introduction to Catholic Christianity

== Sports ==
Loretto was a member of the California Interscholastic Federation, Sac-Joaquin Section and competed in the Capital Athletic League. The CAL was composed of the following schools: Bella Vista Broncos, Casa Roble Rams, Del Campo Cougars, El Camino Eagles, Mira Loma Matadors and the Rio Americano Raiders.

Fall Sports: volleyball, cross-country, tennis, golf, water polo
Winter Sports: basketball
Spring Sports: track & field, swimming, diving, soccer, softball

== The arts ==
Students were required to take one year of visual or performing arts such as dance, fine arts, choir, or theater, and a one-trimester "Heritage Class" in the opposite discipline. For example, if a student was enrolled in a yearlong performing-arts class, she was later required to take a one-trimester Art History class. Likewise, if she was enrolled in a yearlong visual-arts class, she was later required to take a one-trimester Music History class. In addition to Heritage Classes, Loretto offered other one-trimester courses in music, art, dance, and theater.
Each spring, students participated in the Festival of the Arts, in which they showcased their creations and held performances in dance, drama, and music.
Visual Arts
Loretto offered a wide array of visual arts classes such Foundations in Visual Arts, Art 1/Art 2, Ceramics 1/Ceramics 2, Drawing 1/Drawing 2, Three-Dimensional Art 1/2, Watercolor, and Advanced Art, and Advanced Studio Art
Dance
Many girls enrolled in one or three-term dance classes each year. There were three levels of dance groups: beginning (Broadway Bound Dance and a 1-trimester Dance course), intermediate (Intermediate Broadway Bound Dance), and advanced Broadway Bound Dance (Advanced Company). The dancers performed in an annual dance concert each spring, which included both company numbers and solos. The numbers are choreographed by both the students and teachers.
Music
Loretto had two levels of choral ensembles: Concert Choir (beginning), and Chamber Singers (advanced). The choirs held 2 annual concerts in December and May. In February 2009, the Loretto Chamber Singers performed at the Jammies Evening of Classical Music at the Mondavi Center at UC Davis. In addition, both choirs sang at the State Capitol, Catholic High School Choral Festival, and various other events. In 2007 and 2009, both choirs won 1st place in their section at the Heritage Festival in Anaheim, CA.
Theater
Girls could take a 1-term Drama Workshop class, or enroll in a yearlong drama class. There were two levels: beginning (Theater Arts), and advanced (Advanced Drama Workshop). As part of the extended curriculum drama students were responsible for teaching and producing the spring dance show: "Broadway Bound" for the Loretto community. Each fall, the school sponsored a dramatic or musical production, and the Advanced Drama class held An Evening of One Acts often curated and directed by students. They participated in the LENEA Festival each year. In 2005 and 2006 Loretto students medaled for their scene work and were honorably mentioned in the monologue category as well. In 2009, girls won a total of 2 gold medals, 1 silver medal, and 2 bronze medals. In the 2005-2006 school year the Drama Department was the center of significant controversy when a new instructor was dismissed at the insistence of the bishop after it was discovered that she lied on her employment application regarding her history of volunteering at an abortion clinic.

== Extracurriculars ==
In addition to standard high school activities such as sports, clubs, and student counsels, Loretto offered unique opportunities for young women to grow. This included travel abroad opportunities to Russia, France, Australia and Asia, a strong commitment to service in the community through mandatory service requirements, and participation in academic competitions.

Clubs A Capella (The Loretto Lionettes), Business and Investments, Book Club, Creative Writing Club, Domestic Divas, Ecology Club, French Club (Le Cercle Francais), Furry Friends, Med Club, Multi-Cultural Club, Peace Club, Pink Ladies, Political Society, Photography, Relaxation, Shakespeare Society, Spanish Club, Spanish Conversation, Spirit and Sport, Yoga Club

State or National Organizations California Scholarship Federation (CSF), Friday Night Live, Key Club, National Honor Society (NHS), TEAMS (Test of Engineering Aptitude, Mathematics, and Science)

Service Groups Recruitment Team, S.A.L.T. (Spiritually Alive Liturgy Team)

Co-Curricular Activities Mock Trial

School Activities throughout the Year

- Annual Blood Drive
- Baccalaureate
- Big Sisters
- Christmas Toy Drive
- Class Retreats
- Club Fair
- College Tour
- College Ambassador Meetings
- Community Service
- Dances
- Dance Concert
- Diaper Drive for Wellspring
- Dress-for-Funds Collections
- Fall Play/Musical, Spring One-Acts
- Father-Daughter Dance
- Festival of the Arts
- Graduation
- Halloween Festivities (costume contest, pumpkin-carving contest)
- Homecoming Week, Rally, Collection, and Dance
- Junior-Senior Luncheon
- Lenten Collection
- "Little Sister" Shadow Days
- Liturgies and Assemblies
- Locks of Love
- Fashion Show
- Freshman Retreat and Orientation
- Frosh Unity Luncheons
- Mary Ward Day
- Mock Presidential Election
- Mock Trial
- On-the-Road Recruitment
- Prom
- S.A.L.T.
- Senior Final Assembly
- Senior Silent Retreat
- Service Trip to Tijuana
- Shadow Days
- Shakespeare Festival
- Sophomore Ring Ceremony
- Sports
- Student Appreciation Day
- Teacher Appreciation Day
- Trips to Europe and Foreign Countries
- Yearbook
- WSP Magazine Sale
