= Peter C. Doerhoefer House =

United States historic place

- U.S. National Register of Historic Places
- Location within Kentucky
- Location: 4422 W. Broadway, Louisville, Kentucky
- Coordinates: 38°15′00″N 85°49′34″W
- Area: less than one acre
- Built: 1908
- Architectural style: Eclectic
- MPS: West Louisville MRA
- NRHP reference No.: 83002658
- Added to NRHP: September 8, 1983

The Peter C. Doerhoefer House, at 4422 W. Broadway in Louisville, Kentucky was built in 1908. It is adjacent to the Basil Doerhoefer House at 4432 W. Broadway. Both were listed on the National Register of Historic Places in 1983 as part of a study of historic resources in west Louisville.

Its architecture is eclectic and the home is an example of turn-of-the-century architecture in the West Broadway area. It is one of the largest and most monumentally detailed of the American Foursquares in Louisville.

A large, two and one-half story frame dwelling on a limestone foundation, it has a veranda across the front. Most of the west side has a concrete balustrade. The front has a low, hipped porch roof supported by square, paneled pillars. The central, double doorway, and flanking sidelights have leaded glass. A large rectangular window adorns the sides of the ground floor facade. Directly above the entry are a pair of small windows, flanked by larger ones.

== History ==
This residence was built in 1908 for Peter C. Doerhoefer, vice-president of the Monarch Tobacco Works and son of Basil Doerhoefer. The land was actually part of the same lot where the elder Doerhoefer had built his magnificent home several years earlier. All this land and both houses were sold to the Loretto High School in 1925. It is now owned by Christ Temple Apostolic Church."

In 1981 it was owned by Christ Temple Apostolic Church, Inc.

The house was registered on Louisville's list of local landmarks in 2011. The house was included in Preservation Louisville's list of top 10 most endangered historic places in 2012, and was continued in that list through at least 2014. Preservation Louisville noted that Christ Temple Apostolic Church "does not use the house and would like to no longer maintain the property."

In August 2016 a rear portion of the house was determined to be in imminent danger of collapse, and a professional engineer recommended demolition of the entire building. Louisville's mayor Greg Fischer stated "'We don't know if this building can be saved, but we are exploring all options,'" and added "that this situation 'underscores the value of the new Historic Preservation Advisory Task Force formed earlier this year.'"
