= W. Mark Bassett =

American LDS religious leader and business executive (1966–2026)

Executive Director of the Missionary Department
- 2023 – May 11, 2026
- Predecessor: Marcus B. Nash

First Quorum of the Seventy
- April 2, 2016 – May 11, 2026

Assistant Executive Director of the Missionary Department
- 2019 – 2023
- End reason: Called to be executive director of the Missionary Department

Area Seventy (Fifth Quorum of the Seventy)
- 2010 – April 2, 2016
- End reason: Called to be a General Authority Seventy

Personal details
- Born: William Mark Bassett; August 14, 1966; Carmichael, California, United States
- Died: May 11, 2026 (aged 59); St. George, Utah, United States
- Cause of death: Traumatic brain injury
- Education: Brigham Young University (B.S., 1991)
- Spouse(s): Angela Brasher (m. 1989)
- Children: 5

William Mark Bassett (August 14, 1966 – May 11, 2026) was an American religious leader and business executive who served as a General Authority Seventy of The Church of Jesus Christ of Latter-day Saints. He was sustained to the position on April 2, 2016 and held various leadership assignments in North and South America.

From 2023 until his death, he served as Executive Director of the church's Missionary Department. Before entering full-time church service, he worked in the wholesale automotive industry as a financial executive and business owner.

== Early life and education ==
Bassett was born on August 14, 1966 in Carmichael, California, to William Lynn Bassett and Edwina Acker Bassett. He grew up in California and attended local schools.

From 1985 to 1987, he served as a full-time missionary in the Guatemala City Mission. After returning to the United States, he attended Brigham Young University in Provo, Utah, where he earned a bachelor's degree in accounting in 1991.

=== Business career ===
After graduating from university, Bassett worked in California's wholesale automotive industry. He began his career as controller and then CFO of Brasher's Sacramento Auto Auction. He later became a co-owner and chief financial officer of West Coast Auto Auctions, Inc., which operated wholesale automobile auctions in California, Oregon, Nevada, and Idaho. He remained with the company until 2007.

== Ecclesiastical service ==
Bassett held first many positions in local church congregations and administrative units, including Young Men president, bishop, high councilor, and a stake president.

From 2007 to 2010, he served as president of the Arizona Mesa Mission. He then returned to California and served as an Area Seventy in the Fifth Quorum of the Seventy in the North America West Area.

On 2 April 2016, Bassett was sustained as a General Authority Seventy during the church's annual general conference. His subsequent assignments included service in the area presidencies of the Brazil, North America Northeast, and North America Southeast areas.

=== Executive Director ===
In 2019, Bassett was assigned to the church's headquarters in Salt Lake City, Utah, as Assistant Executive Director of the Missionary Department. He became Executive Director of the department in 2023, overseeing its administrative and operational work.

In November 2025, following the church's adjustments lowering the minimum age of service for young women, Bassett conducted administrative press briefings outlining the impact of the change. He noted the voluntary nature of female service compared to the priesthood duties assigned to young men and managed the subsequent influx of applications from young women.

== Personal life and death ==
Bassett married Angela Brasher on 20 December 1989 in the Salt Lake Temple. They had five children.

While visiting St. George, Utah, with his family, Bassett suffered a traumatic brain injury. He died from the injury on 11 May 2026, aged 59.

A viewing and funeral service were held on 19 May 2026 at the North Salt Lake Utah Stake Center. President D. Todd Christofferson, the second counselor in the First Presidency, presided over the service, which was conducted by Bishop Bryan E. Stevenson of the Hidden Lake Ward. The service was attended by additional members of the Quorum of the Twelve Apostles, including Neil L. Andersen, Ronald A. Rasband, Patrick Kearon, and Clark G. Gilbert. Following the funeral, Bassett was buried at Larkin Sunset Gardens in Sandy, Utah.
