= San Juan Unified School District =

School district in California

Address
- 3738 Walnut Avenue Carmichael, California, 95608; United States

District information
- Type: Public
- Grades: Infant/Toddler, Preschool, TK, K–12 and adult education
- Established: 1960
- Superintendent: Melissa Bassanelli
- Schools: 64
- Budget: $337 million
- NCES District ID: 0634620

Students and staff
- Students: 39,218 (2020–2021)
- Teachers: 1,710.99 (FTE)
- Staff: 2,045.11 (FTE)
- Student–teacher ratio: 22.92:1

Other information
- Website: www.sanjuan.edu

San Juan Unified School District is a school district in northern Sacramento County, California. The district includes numerous elementary schools, eight K-8 schools, eight middle schools, and nine high schools. There are also a number of alternative schools, early childhood centers, and adult education centers.

== Boundary ==
San Juan Unified serves all of the CDPs of Arden-Arcade, Fair Oaks, Gold River and Orangevale, almost all of the city of Citrus Heights and the CDP of Carmichael, and sections of the cities of Folsom, Rancho Cordova and Sacramento and the CDPs of Antelope, Foothill Farms, McClellan Park and North Highlands.

== High schools ==
The district's nine comprehensive high schools include:

- Bella Vista High School
- Casa Roble High School
- Del Campo High School
- El Camino Fundamental High School
- Encina High School
- Mesa Verde High School
- Mira Loma High School
- Rio Americano High School
- San Juan High School
- Meraki High School (Public Alternative Education)

== Middle schools ==
San Juan Unified School District has a total of eight middle schools:

- Andrew Carnegie Middle School
- Arcade Fundamental Middle School
- Arden Middle School
- John Barrett Middle School
- Katherine Johnson Middle School
- Louis Pasteur Middle School
- Sylvan Middle School
- Will Rogers Middle School
- Winston Churchill Middle School

== K-8 schools ==
- Gold River Discovery Center
- Kingswood K-8
- Lichen K-8
- Orangevale Open K-8
- Sierra Oaks K-8
- Starr King K-8
- Thomas Edison Language Institute
- Woodside K-8

== Elementary schools ==
- Arlington Heights Elementary
- Cambridge Heights Elementary
- Cameron Ranch Elementary
- Carmichael Elementary
- Carriage Drive Elementary
- Cottage Elementary
- James R. Cowan Fundamental Elementary
- Coyle Avenue Elementary
- Del Dayo Elementary
- Del Paso Manor Elementary
- Deterding Elementary
- Harry Dewey Fund. Elementary
- Dyer-Kelly Elementary
- Grand Oaks Elementary
- Green Oaks Fundamental Elementary
- Greer Elementary
- Howe Avenue Elementary
- Thomas Kelly Elementary
- Earl Le Gette Elementary
- Mariemont Elementary
- Mariposa Elementary
- Mission Avenue Elementary
- Northridge Elementary
- Oakview Community Elementary
- Ottoman Elementary
- Pasadena Elementary
- Charles Peck Elementary
- Pershing Elementary
- Albert Schweitzer Elementary
- Skycrest Elementary
- Trajan Elementary
- Twin Lakes Elementary
- Whitney Avenue Elementary

== Continuation schools ==
- La Entrada Continuation/AdvancePath Academy
- Laurel Ruff - Community Transition Programs (special education)
- Sunrise Tech Center

== Other ==
- Camp Winthers Camp owned by (San Juan Unified)
- El Sereno High School (Independent Study)
- La Vista Center (Special education)
- Ralph Richardson Center (Special education)

== Sources ==
- Welcome to San Juan Unified
