= Bella Vista High School =

- School logo

Location
- 8301 Madison Ave; Fair Oaks, California 95628; United States; 38.66522°N 121.25189°W

Information
- Type: Public
- Established: 1960
- School district: San Juan Unified School District
- NCES School ID: 05756
- Principal: Edward Moore
- Teaching staff: 80.82 (FTE)
- Grades: 9–12
- Enrollment: 1,926 (2023-2024)
- Student to teacher ratio: 23.83
- Campus type: Suburban
- Colors: Red and Black
- Mascot: Bronco
- Yearbook: La Remuda
- Website: Bella Vista High Website

Bella Vista High School is a public high school in Fair Oaks, California. It is a member of the San Juan Unified School District and serves eastern Fair Oaks and southern Orangevale. In 2003, the California Department of Education's School Recognition Program honored Bella Vista High School as a "California Distinguished School". It was also the only school in Sacramento County to receive this honor in 2003. In 2009, it received the same recognition again from the California Department of Education. On November 18, 2010, the school celebrated its 50th anniversary with a special presentation for all past and current students. The presentation included a guided tour of the school spotlighting where changes have been made throughout the campus since the school's foundation in 1960.

This map shows the incorporated and unincorporated areas in Sacramento County, California, highlighting Fair Oaks in red.

== Curriculum ==
Bella Vista offers ten AP courses. A special business course called Advanced Computer Applications is available to qualified students who, once completed, will be eligible for three units of credit at Sacramento State University through the Accelerated College Entrance off-campus program. It is one of the few campuses in its district to offer Japanese. Other foreign languages include French and Spanish.

== Extracurricular activities ==
The academic decathlon team has represented Sacramento County in the California Academic Decathlon for 20 out of the past 24 years. In 2008, the team took back the county title after placing third in 2007. In 2009 they won the county again but were defeated in 2010 by rival Folsom High School. In 2011, Folsom again took first place in the county competition, but in 2012 Bella Vista regained their title.

The moot court team earned the first-place team award at the National High School Moot Court Competition in Washington, D.C. in 2003, 2005 and 2006. In 2008, 2011, 2016, and 2020 they received 1st place in the county competition.

Bella Vista's Marching Band was recognized by Sacramento Magazine as one of the best marching bands in the Sacramento area in 2004 and 2005. Under the direction of Edward Moore, the band has accumulated hundreds of trophies and has competed out of state and even in Europe in 2006. They were also undefeated in their division in 2009. Two years later, in 2011, the band also went undefeated in their division, except for one judging error causing them to lose to the Del Oro marching band.

The school newspaper is known as La Bandera, while the school yearbook is called La Remuda.

== Alumni ==
- Lynn Anderson (1965), country music star
- Randall Bal (1999), member of the United States men's swim team
- Justin Bannan (1997), defensive tackle for the Denver Broncos
- Rob Bonta (1989), Attorney General of California
- DJ Countess (2000), soccer player for Atletico Tigre
- Carl Cranke (1966), professional motorcycle enduro racer and member of the AMA Motorcycle Hall of Fame
- Steve Cronin (2001), goalkeeper for the D.C. United of Major League Soccer, 10th overall pick in 2004 MLS Superdraft
- Angel Deradoorian, member of indie rock band Dirty Projectors and solo artist
- Alyssa Farah, 3rd White House Director of Strategic Communications and former press secretary for Mike Pence
- John Fund (1975), journalist
- Justin Haley, former MLB player (Minnesota Twins, Boston Red Sox)
- Hill Harper (1984), author and actor, presently as Sheldon Hawkes on CSI: NY
- John Holland, member of the 1972 USA Olympic Team, whitewater kayaking
- Jay Johnson (1967), former model and Warhol Superstar
- Jed Johnson (1967), interior designer and film director
- Gordon King (1974), professional football player for the New York Giants
- Peter Lowry (2003), midfielder for the Portland Timbers of Major League Soccer
- Joan Lunden (1968), actress and former host of Good Morning America
- Derek Miles (1991), finished seventh in the pole vault at the 2004 Summer Olympics, and fourth at the 2008 Summer Olympics
- Dave Revering, former MLB first baseman
- Tyler Robertson (2006), 2006 California State Baseball player of the Year, MLB player (Minnesota Twins)
- Casey Serin (2000), "the world's most hated blogger", known for mortgage fraud
- Ramit Sethi (2000), author of "I Will Teach You To Be Rich"
- Kevin Sharp (1989), country singer
- Heather Rene Smith (2005), Playboy Playmate
- Nicholas Sparks (1984), Author of 22 novels, 11 of which have been turned into films.
- Steven L. Thompson (1966) author, journalist, historian, motorcycle racer
