= Joe Inglett =

American baseball player (born 1978)

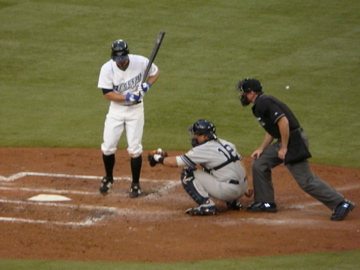
- Inglett with the Toronto Blue Jays
- Second baseman / Outfielder
- Born: June 29, 1978 (age 47); Sacramento, California, U.S.
- Batted: Left Threw: Right

MLB debut
- June 21, 2006, for the Cleveland Indians

Last MLB appearance
- May 11, 2011, for the Houston Astros

MLB statistics
- Batting average: .283
- Home runs: 6
- Runs batted in: 77
- Stats at Baseball Reference

Teams
- Cleveland Indians (2006); Toronto Blue Jays (2007–2009); Milwaukee Brewers (2010); Houston Astros (2011)

Joseph Steven Inglett (born June 29, 1978) is an American former professional baseball utility player. He played in Major League Baseball (MLB) between 2006 and 2011 for the Cleveland Indians, Toronto Blue Jays, Milwaukee Brewers, and Houston Astros.

== Amateur career ==
Born in Sacramento, California, Inglett attended Mesa Verde High School, and went on to play college baseball at the University of Nevada, Reno. In 1997, he played collegiate summer baseball in the Cape Cod Baseball League for the Chatham A's, and returned to the league in 1999 to play with the Bourne Braves. He was selected by the Cleveland Indians in the eighth round of the 2000 MLB draft.

== Major League career ==
=== Cleveland Indians ===
Inglett made his major league debut with the Indians on June 21, 2006, and batted .284 with two home runs and 21 RBI in 64 games in his rookie season with Cleveland.

Inglett spent the 2007 minor league season with the Triple-A Buffalo Bisons. He played 107 games for the Bisons, batting .253 with four home runs and 57 RBI. Inglett was designated for assignment on September 6, 2007, to clear room for David Dellucci, who was coming off the 60-day DL.

=== Toronto Blue Jays ===
He was claimed off waivers by the Toronto Blue Jays on September 14, 2007, and played in two games before the season ended.

Inglett was nicknamed "Voodoo Joe" by former Blue Jays' manager John Gibbons. He has also been nicknamed "Mighty Joe" by radio announcer Jerry Howarth. The "Voodoo Joe" nickname came from the fact that twice in the 2008 season, Inglett was sent down to Triple-A Syracuse to make room for returning regular players, only to be called back the same day because of new injuries. Both times, Inglett was able to return within a few hours of leaving.

On August 21, 2008, Inglett went 4-for-5 with a double, a stolen base, and three runs scored in a 14–3 win over the New York Yankees.

During the 2008 season, a string of injuries plagued the Toronto Blue Jays starting lineup, Inglett was used as a utility player as David Eckstein, John McDonald, Scott Rolen and Vernon Wells spent time on the disabled list. He played 66 games at second base, six games at third base, two games at shortstop and 34 games at the outfield positions. Inglett would finish the season batting .297 with three home runs and 39 RBI in 109 games with the Blue Jays.

In 2009 spring training, Inglett was expected to play in the majors again, but was sent down to the Triple-A Las Vegas 51s, along with relief pitcher Jeremy Accardo. Later in the season, Inglett was called up from Las Vegas along with Casey Janssen and Ricky Romero. On May 22, Inglett made his season debut pinch-hitting for Roy Halladay and struck out looking.

=== Texas Rangers ===
On December 4, 2009, Inglett was claimed off waivers by the Texas Rangers. On January 25, 2010, Inglett was designated for assignment.

=== Milwaukee Brewers ===
On January 27, 2010, Inglett was claimed off waivers by the Milwaukee Brewers. On July 27, 2010, Inglett pitched one inning of relief against the Cincinnati Reds, who were leading 12–4 heading into the ninth inning. Lobbing pitches no faster than 57 mph, he allowed no runs on no hits and no base runners with just six pitches in a three-up, three-down inning. He was non-tendered a contract at the end of the season and, therefore, became a free agent. He led the league in pinch hits in 2010.

=== Tampa Bay Rays ===
On February 18, 2011, Inglett signed a minor league contract with the Tampa Bay Rays. The deal included an invite to spring training.

=== Houston Astros ===
On March 27, 2011, the Houston Astros acquired Inglett from the Rays in exchange for a player to be named later or cash considerations. He was designated for assignment on April 28, only to have his contract re-purchased on May 8. He was outrighted to the minors again on May 12. He was released on May 27.

== Personal life ==
Inglett graduated from Mesa Verde High School in 1996. He graduated from the University of Nevada, Reno, and now is happily married to his wife, Kelly, with whom he has three children.
