= Casa de los Gobernadores =

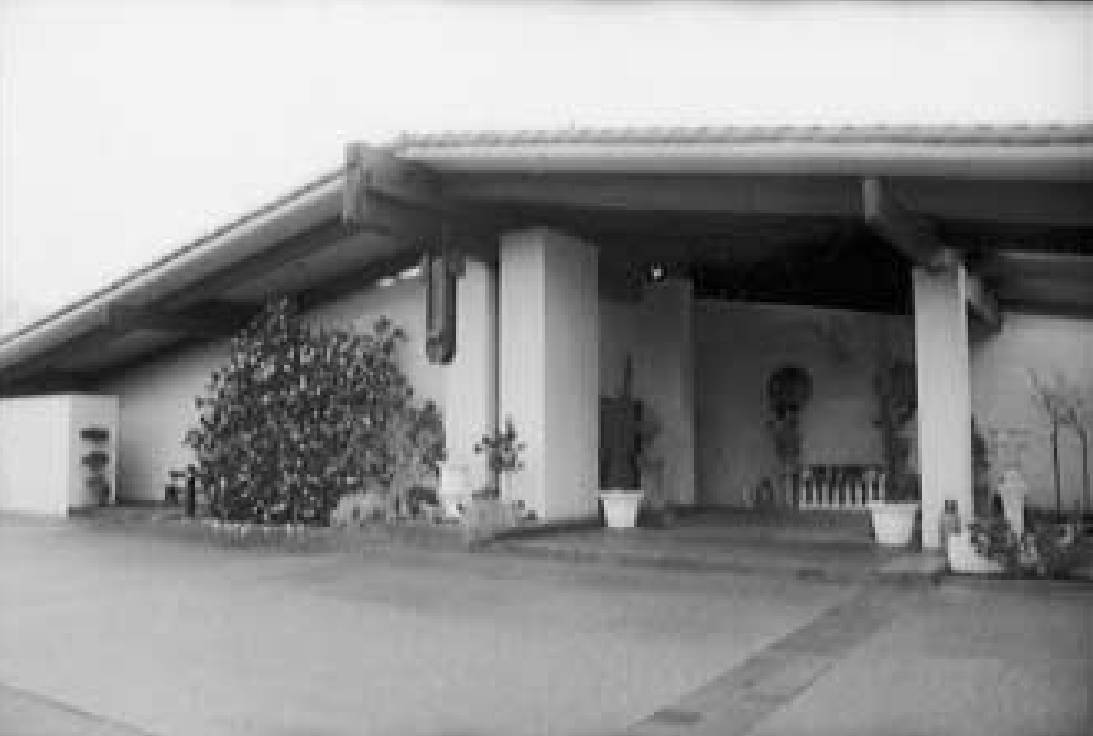

General information
- Architectural style: Early California / Hacienda-style
- Location: 2300 California Ave; Carmichael, California
- Coordinates: 38°36′21″N 121°19′17″W

The Casa de los Gobernadores (Spanish for "House of the Governors") is a mansion that was originally built to serve as the official residence of the governor of California, located in Carmichael, California, in Greater Sacramento. Today, it serves as a private residence.

== History ==
The origins of Casa de los Gobernadores lie in 1967, when a group of citizens raised $200,000 to acquire the land as a prospective site for a new governor's mansion. Amongst the donors were Leonard Firestone and Holmes Tuttle. The Carmichael property was subsequently conveyed to the Government of California by grant deed in 1969.

In 1970, the California Legislature designated the property as the site of the future governor's mansion. In 1972, the legislature budgeted $150,000 for preliminary plans for the mansion and $1.3 million for the construction of the building. The mansion began construction in 1974 and was completed in 1975, during the term of Governor Ronald Reagan.

Reagan never resided in the mansion as it was completed after his term ended. Reagan's successor, Governor Jerry Brown, opted not to live in the newly-completed mansion.

In 1982, the property was put up for sale by Governor Brown's administration. However, Brown's successor, Governor George Deukmejian, expressed interest in living at the mansion when he became governor in January 1983, which led to the property being withdrawn from sale. However, pressure from the legislature led to the sale of the mansion in late 1983; it is now a private residence with no connection to the government of California.

In 2004, Arnold Schwarzenegger, shortly after being elected governor, explored the possibility of repurchasing the property to serve as the official governor's residence, but ultimately decided to commute to Sacramento via private jet from Los Angeles.

== Description ==
Casa de los Gobernadores is a one-story, hacienda-style mansion, with 17 rooms, including a master suite, four bedrooms, library, living room, dining room, recreation areas, and guest quarters. The house is 11,984 square feet (1,113.4 m^{2}) and located on an 11.3-acre (4.6 ha) parcel with a view of the American River.

== See also ==
- Governor of California
- Governor's Mansion State Historic Park
- Stanford Mansion
