= Mira Loma High School =

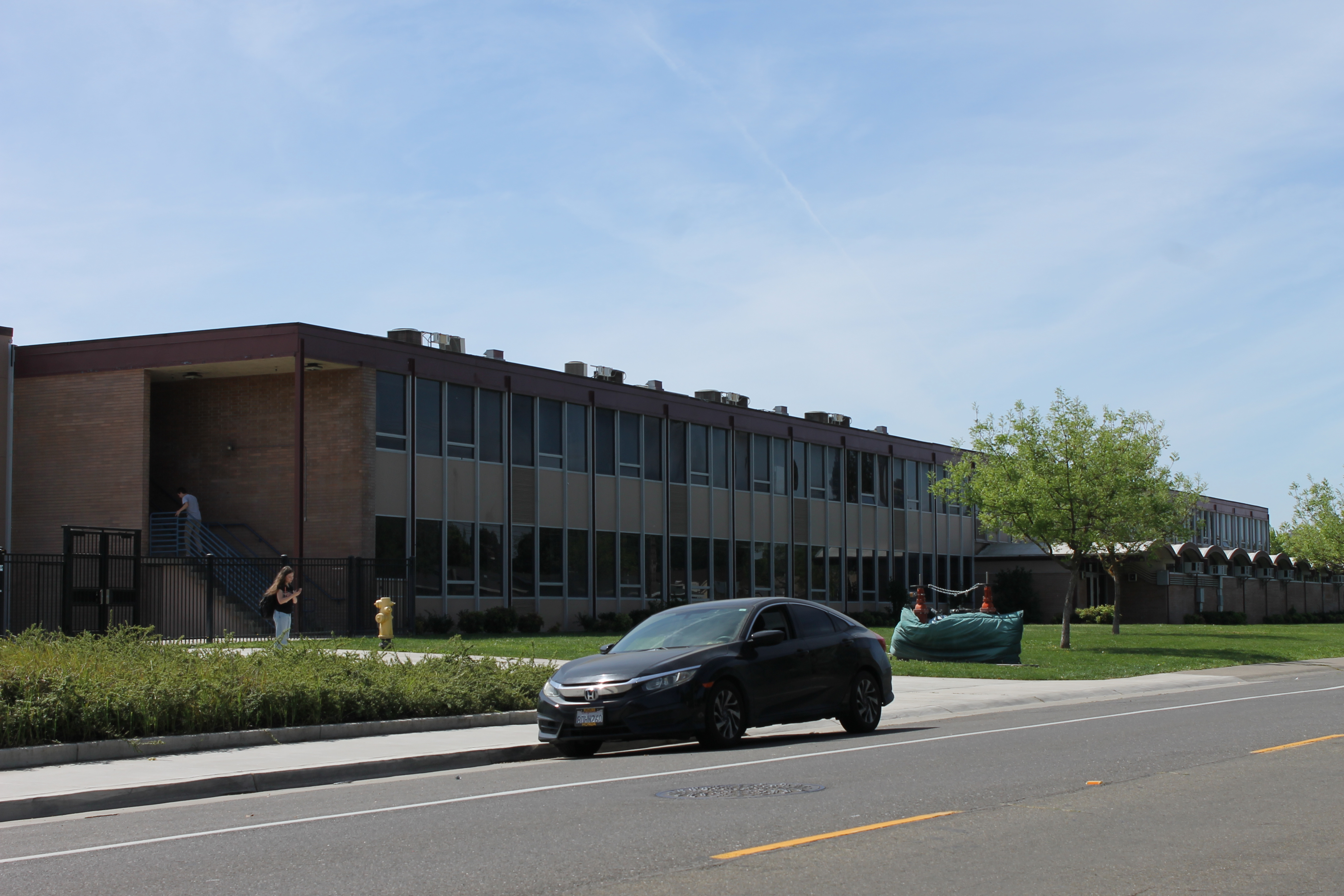

Location
- 4000 Edison Ave; Sacramento, California 95821; United States; 38°37′59″N 121°22′16″W

Information
- Established: 1960
- School district: San Juan Unified School District
- Superintendent: Kent Kern
- Principal: Kaden Bahner
- Faculty: 69.85 (FTE)
- Grades: 9–12
- Enrollment: 1,632 (2023-2024)
- Student to teacher ratio: 23.26
- Colors: Columbia Blue, Scarlet Red & White
- Athletics conference: Golden Empire League
- Mascot: Matadors
- Newspaper: Mira Loma Today
- Yearbook: Recuerdos
- Website: miraloma.sanjuan.edu

Mira Loma High School is a public high school located in Arden-Arcade, California, United States. It is located south of Interstate 80, and east of Watt Avenue. It is a part of the San Juan Unified School District with a student body of approximately 1700 students from northeast Arden-Arcade and western Carmichael.

Mira Loma High School has been an IB World School since 1989, and is the largest International Baccalaureate program in Northern California. Mira Loma also achieves consistently high pass rates for IB exams, taken as part of the May session.

According to Mira Loma, in 1996–1997 the school had a pass rate of 93%, with a 100% diploma attainment rate for students. In 2007–2008 the pass rate was 93% with a 100% diploma attainment rate. Both statistics are well above both the North American average (78%) and the world average (81%) for diploma attainment. For the 2015–2016 school year, Mira Loma has the highest average SAT score in the Sacramento area.

== Education ==
Mira Loma offers a large number of International Baccalaureate courses that prepare students for IB examinations every spring. The IB tests are either Standard Level (SL) or Higher Level (HL) based on the amount of coursework prior to the examination. Mira Loma students tested in 18 different IB subjects in 2016.

It is one of the few campuses in its district to offer Mandarin Chinese as well as Japanese. It also offers Spanish and French as other foreign languages.

Additionally, AP Calculus is offered to eligible students, as well as AP Computer Science Principles. Other Advanced Placement courses (AP US History, AP Physics, AP Biology, AP Chemistry, AP Chinese Language and Culture, and AP Japanese Language and Culture) were previously offered at Mira Loma, but have since been discontinued in favor of a total IB campus.

== Students ==
Students are enrolled from throughout the Carmichael area, but many of the students participating in the International Baccalaureate program enroll from as far as El Dorado Hills, California. The school has a high rate of poverty, with 47% of the students being considered socioeconomically disadvantaged. As of 2023, Mira Loma is a Title I school. The school has a graduation rate of 91%. 64% of 11th grade students met or exceeded the English language-arts standards as set by the California Standardized Testing and Reporting (STAR) Program, and 54% of 11th grade students met or exceeded the mathematics standards as set by the same organization.

=== Demographics ===
Race/Ethnicity	American Indian	Asian	Black	Hispanic	White	Pacific Islander	Two or More Races
Percentage	<0.5%	26%	6.9%	22%	34%	<1.4%	7.4%

As of the 2023-2024 school year, Mira Loma enrolled 1632 students and the total minority enrollment is 65%. Due to the diverse racial and ethnic enrollment of its students, Mira Loma has consistently ranked as one the most diverse public high schools in California.

== Extracurricular activities ==
=== Academic competition ===
The Mira Loma National Science Bowl team (consisting of a group of students that answer gameshow-style questions on science and mathematics) won the national championship in 2009, 2011, 2013, 2014, and 2015. With five victories, the school has more than any other in the history of Science Bowl, and their 3-year win streak is the second-longest in the history of the competition.

The Mira Loma Science Olympiad team regularly competes in the regional, state, and national level in various competitions sponsored by the United States Department of Energy. In 2016, the team won the National Tournament, and has placed highly in national competitions in other years. Mira Loma High School hosts the Sacramento Regional Science Olympiad every year.

Mira Loma's Speech and Debate team was re-founded in 2005 by a small group of students, after Andrew Barkett and Peter Lee briefly participated as the Mira Loma team for Oxford/Policy debate in the 1994-1995 and 1995-1996 school years, winning the Sacramento/San Joaquin regional qualifying tournament and going to the state tournament in 1995. The official coach of the team during the 1994-1995 season was English teacher Guy Roberts, but Barkett and Lee practiced with the J John F. Kennedy High School team for much of the season.

Mira Loma participates in the International Science Olympiads including Chemistry, Mathematics, Physics, Biology, and Astronomy.

=== Athletics ===
Mira Loma also offers a full range of athletic teams at varsity, junior varsity (JV) and freshman levels.

Fall

- Cross Country (Boys/Girls)
- Flag Football (Girls)
- Football
- Golf (Girls)
- Tennis (Girls)
- Volleyball (Girls)
- Water Polo (Boys/Girls)

Winter

- Basketball (Boys/Girls)
- Soccer (Boys/Girls)
- Wrestling

Spring

- Baseball
- Golf (Boys)
- Softball
- Swim (Boys/Girls)
- Tennis (Boys)
- Track & Field (Boys/Girls)

In 2025, the football team defeated Foresthill 48-14 to win the CIF Sac-Joaquin Section Division VIII championship, which is for 8-man football. Mira Loma was in its first section final since its 1981 team lost to Placer in Division II.

=== Clubs ===
Mira Loma also offers a variety of extracurricular clubs that meet at lunch and after school. Some of these clubs include Science Bowl, Astronomy Club, Bioengineering Club, Culinary Club, Speech and Debate, Forces of Nature, Poetry Club, Math Club, Books For Youth, Mock Trials, B Sharps, as well as ethnic organizations such as Latinos Unidos, Black Students Union, Chinese Culture Club and Desi Student Association. Religious organizations include the Slavic Christian Club and Muslim Students Association. Other extracurricular clubs include Matadors Against Cancer (American Cancer Society), Future Business Leaders of America, Business Professionals of America, Mira Loma Video Game Tournament Club, Mira Loma Computing Club, Climate Crisis Club, Habitat for Humanity Club, Key Club, and a chapter of the National Spanish Honor Society. French, Japanese, and Chinese clubs are also active on campus.

== Traditions ==
=== Sports-A-Rama ===
Mira Loma's highest attended and most anticipated event of the school year is Sports-A-Rama (SAR). It is a multi-class competition where freshman, sophomore, juniors and seniors participate in various game-like events and performances. In order to foster school spirit and class camaraderie, preliminary activities such as penny wars, broomball, and decoration parties are scheduled leading up to SAR.

History

Sports-A-Rama is the brainchild of Doug Woodard, the activities director at La Sierra High School (Carmichael, CA). Some of the activities that he saw working as a director inspired him to come up with a much bigger idea: to create an event that would increase school spirit by involving all 4 classes competing in a dozen or more activities. Then in 1983, La Sierra closed down. The La Sierra High School juniors, sophomores, and freshmen brought this low-key SAR idea with them when they transferred to Mira Loma.

Events

- Obstacle Course
- Crab Soccer
- Tug of War
- Layup Relay
- Wheelbarrow Race
- Hungry Hippos
- Dizzy Penalty

== Arcade Creek Project ==
The Mira Loma Arcade Creek Project was a project studying the riparian corridor of an urban watershed in Sacramento, California. It consisted of eleven studies which measured the health of the Arcade Creek and was run by students of Mira Loma High School and five faculty advisers. The project received awards and recognitions including the Governor's Environmental and Economic Leadership Award. In 2010, the project was awarded $10,000 from the National Sea World / Busch Gardens' Environmental Excellence Award.

On September 23, 2017, the film Arcade Creek Project: A Mosaic of Sustainability was premiered at the Sacramento Film and Music Festival. This documentary, directed by Jierel Almario, tells the story of the Arcade Creek Project, and the efforts of students to restore it.

== Notable alumni ==
- Richard Chase (class of 1968); "The Vampire of Sacramento" schizophrenic serial killer
- Alex Honnold (class of 2003); free climber
- James House (singer) (class of 1973); country songwriter and singer
- Sam J. Jones (class of 1972); actor
- Peter Mansoor (class of 1978); retired United States Army officer, military historian, academic and commentator on national security affairs
- John Powell (athlete) (class of 1965); track and field athlete, 1976 Olympic medalist and former world record holder in the discus
- Shawna Yang Ryan (class of 1994); author of Green Island and Water Ghosts
- Justin E. H. Smith (class of 1990); philosopher and author
- Will Swan (class of 2003); guitarist of Dance Gavin Dance, Secret Band, and Sianvar; founder of Blue Swan Records
