= Eric Stuteville =

American basketball player (born 1995)

Personal information
- Born: February 6, 1995 (age 31)
- Listed height: 6 ft 11 in (2.11 m)
- Listed weight: 256 lb (116 kg)

Career information
- High school: Casa Roble (Orangevale, California)
- College: Sacramento State (2013–2017)
- NBA draft: 2017: undrafted
- Playing career: 2017–2021
- Position: Center

Career history
- 2017–2019: Northern Arizona Suns
- 2019–2020: Kangoeroes Mechelen
- 2020: Alytus Dzūkija
- 2021: Erie BayHawks

Eric Stuteville (born February 6, 1995) is an American former professional basketball player. He competed in college at California State University, Sacramento (Sacramento State).

== High school career ==
His father Shannon played basketball for NAIA Langston University in Oklahoma while his mother, Kristine played for UC Berkeley. Stuteville's brother Mason plays for Park University. Eric Stuteville began playing organized basketball as a freshman at Casa Roble High School. He had a growth spurt the following year, growing from 6-foot-1 to 6-foot-7. Stuteville joined NorCal Pharaohs of AAU play. As a senior, he led Casa Roble to a 23–9 record and a berth in the California Interscholastic Federation (CIF) Division III State Championships while averaging 21.7 points and 12.3 rebounds per game. Stuteville was named co-MVP of the Capital Valley League, first team all-league, and first team all-Metro.

== College career ==
As a senior at Sacramento State, Stuteville averaged 11.6 points, 6.3 rebounds and 1.5 blocks while shooting 63.2 percent, a single season Hornets record. Over the course of his career, he set the Sacramento State record for games played (125) and was 14th in points scored (1,013). He became the first center in school history to score 1,000 points.

== Professional career ==
Stuteville played for the Sacramento Kings in the NBA Summer League, becoming the first former Sacramento State player to compete in the Summer League. He was selected first overall in the 2017 NBA G League Draft by the Northern Arizona Suns. Stuteville did not play much for the Suns at first but began to develop a rhythm as the season progressed and improved defensively.

On September 24, 2019, Stuteville signed with Kangoeroes Mechelen of the Pro Basketball League (DBL). In 2020, he signed with Alytus Dzūkija of the Lithuanian Basketball League. In two games, Stuteville averaged 2.5 points per game. His contract was terminated on October 29, 2020.

On March 1, 2021, Stuteville signed with the Erie BayHawks of the NBA G League.
