= Encina High School =

Public high school in Sacramento, California

Coordinates: 38.592°N 121.409°W

Location
- 1400 Bell St; Sacramento, California 95825

Information
- Type: Public high school
- Established: 1958
- School district: San Juan Unified School District
- Teaching staff: 35.57 (FTE)
- Grades: 9 to 12
- Enrollment: 628 (2023-2024)
- Student to teacher ratio: 17.66
- Campus: Suburban
- Colors: Cardinal and Gold
- Team name: Bulldogs
- Website: Encina High School Online

Encina High School is an four-year public school located in Arden-Arcade, California, United States. It is a member of the San Juan Unified School District. The school's enrollment area comprises the surrounding Arden Arcade area. Their school rival is San Juan High School, also located within the San Juan Unified School District.

== History ==
Encina High School was established on September 2, 1958. The first classes held freshmen and sophomores, and the school graduated their first class in the spring of 1961. Students were asked for their input on school colors and mascot and choose Cardinal Red and Gold and the Apaches. During the 1989–1990 school year, the San Juan Unified School District requested that Encina change their mascot from an Apache to something more culturally sensitive, and so the class of 1991 were the very first Encina Bulldogs.

While the school thrived during its early years, beginning in the 1980s it has suffered from low enrollment and been suggested for closure several times in its recent history.

In 1995, Encina High School garnered national attention when a riot broke out after on-campus police officers used pepper spray and batons against students in the cafeteria. Students involved in the incident argued that it was the overreaction of law enforcement to an argument between two students that led to six students being arrested and nine others being sent to the hospital to be treated for bruises and adverse reactions to inhaling pepper spray.

Encina is known for its rich basketball tradition; every year since 2000, a fundraiser basketball game is played between the alumni and current students. The game raises thousands of dollars that go towards improving student programs for the kids.

On April 29, 2011, John F. Goodman became the first inductee into Encina High School's Hall of Fame.

== Demographics ==
The school has approximately 1100 students, with large populations of African American, Hispanic/Latino, White, Middle Eastern, and Asian/Pacific Islanders. The school also educates many immigrants whose first languages include Spanish, Russian, and Ukrainian.

== Notable alumni ==
- Barbara Alby, California assemblywoman (did not graduate)
- Miguel Aguilar, professional footballer
- Jim Eakins, NBA/ABA player
- John F. Goodman (class of 1963), United States Marine Corps Lieutenant General and NFL player
- Rich Piana (class of 1988), bodybuilder and Mr. California
- Timothy B. Schmit, bass player for The Eagles
- John C. Williams, president and CEO of the Federal Reserve Bank of New York
- David J. Wineland, 2012 Nobel Prize winner for physics
- Sherilyn Wolter, actress
