= 2017 NBA G League draft =

General information
- Sport: Basketball
- Date: October 21, 2017

Overview
- League: NBA
- First selection: Eric Stuteville, Northern Arizona Suns

The 2017 NBA G League Draft was the 17th draft of the National Basketball Association G League. The draft was held on October 21, 2017, just before the 2017–18 season.

This was the first draft held under the G League banner; the NBA agreed to a partnership deal with Gatorade to rename the developmental league to the NBA G League. This was also the first year that players could sign two-way contracts, allowing players to transition between an NBA team and its G League affiliate.

== Key ==
Pos.	G	F	C
Position	Guard	Forward	Center

^	Denotes player who has been selected to (an) NBA G League All-Star Game(s)
*	Denotes player who has been selected to (an) NBA G League All-Star Game(s) and was also selected in an NBA draft
†	Denotes player who was also selected in an NBA Draft

== Draft ==
=== First round ===
Pick	Player	Pos.	Nationality	Team	College/Country
1	Eric Stuteville	C	United States	Northern Arizona Suns (via Iowa)	Sacramento State
2	Brandon Austin	G	United States	Reno Bighorns (via Salt Lake City)	Northwest Florida State
3	Maverick Rowan	G	United States	Lakeland Magic	North Carolina State
4	Thomas Wimbush	G	United States	Long Island Nets	Fairmont State
5	Paul Watson	G	United States	Westchester Knicks	Fresno State
6	Rahlir Hollis-Jefferson	F	United States	Northern Arizona Suns (via Greensboro)	Temple
7	Chris Flemmings	G	United States	Reno Bighorns	UNC-Wilmington
8	Marquise Moore	G	United States	Iowa Wolves (via Northern Arizona)	George Mason
9	Mychal Mulder	G	Canada	Windy City Bulls	Kentucky
10	Scott Machado	G	United States	South Bay Lakers (via Texas)	Iona
11	Jay Wright	G	United States	Northern Arizona Suns (via Austin)	Louisiana–Lafayette
12	Darin Johnson	G	United States	Delaware 87ers	Cal State Northridge
13	Malcolm Bernard	G	United States	Grand Rapids Drive	Xavier
14	Kris Jenkins	G	United States	Sioux Falls Skyforce	Villanova
15	Tyler Roberson	F	United States	Agua Caliente Clippers	Syracuse
16	Cole Huff	F	United States	Greensboro Swarm (via Wisconsin)	Creighton
17	Maksym Pustozvonov	F	Ukraine	Memphis Hustle	Ukraine
18	Jeremy Hollowell	F	United States	Erie BayHawks	Georgia State
19	Cullen Russo	F	United States	Canton Charge	Fresno State
20	Daesung Lee	G	South Korea	Erie BayHawks (via Maine)	BYU-Hawaii
21	Tra-Deon Hollins	G	United States	Fort Wayne Mad Ants	Omaha
22	Ian Baker	G	United States	South Bay Lakers (via Santa Cruz)	New Mexico State
23	T.J. Wallace	G	United States	Oklahoma City Blue (via Rio Grande Valley)	Pacific Tigers
24	Dominic Cheek	G	United States	Maine Red Claws (via South Bay)	Villanova
25	Tyler Harris	G	United States	Agua Caliente Clippers (via Oklahoma City)	Auburn
26	Kethan Savage	G	United States	Raptors 905	Butler

=== Other notable draftees ===
Rnd.	Pick	Player	Pos.	Nationality	Team	College/Country
2	27	Tony Parker	F/C	United States	Iowa Wolves	UCLA
2	30	Buay Tuach	G/F	Ethiopia	Long Island Nets	Loyola Marymount
2	37	Ty Abbott	G	United States	Delaware 87ers	Arizona State
2	41	Jaylen Morris	G	United States	Erie BayHawks	Molloy College
2	48	Tony Wroten^{†}	G	United States	Rio Grande Valley Vipers	Washington
4	86	Derrick Nix	C	United States	Windy City Bulls	Michigan State
4	95	Amjyot Singh	F	India	Oklahoma City Blue	India
