= Arcade Creek Project =

The Mira Loma Arcade Creek Project was a project studying the riparian corridor of an urban watershed in Sacramento, California. It consisted of eleven studies which measured the health of Arcade Creek and was run entirely by students of Mira Loma High School and five faculty advisers. As of 2017, there were 346 students participating in the project.

The project was initiated in 1998 as part of the school's IB Group 4 project. In 2004, the project was recognised by Governor Schwarzenegger when it was awarded the Governor's Environmental and Economic Leadership Award, California's most prestigious environmental honour.

The project was also awarded a $10,000 environmental excellence award from SeaWorld in 2010.

== List of studies ==
Bio Assay

Bio Assay tested the health of the creek's water using the indicator species Ceriodaphnia dubia which is highly sensitive to toxins and other changes in the creek's water.

Biological Assessment

Biological Assessment monitored populations of macroinvertebrates in the creek bed. Large populations of species in the insect orders Ephemeroptera, Plecoptera and Trichoptera indicate good health of the creek.

Botany

The Botany Study monitored the populations of plant life in the riparian corridor of the creek with a special emphasis on controlling invasive species.

Chemistry

The Chemistry Study monitored the chemical content of the creek water. Measurements of dissolved oxygen, pH, temperature, and various metallic ions were taken. This data could then be used to determine if the water was chemically appropriate for most life at the creek.

Habitat

The Habitat Study measured various physical features of the creek to provide a general description of its health. The group measured water depth, vegetation density, and average tree diameters.

Long Mapping

The Long Mapping Study mapped the general shape and flow of the creek bed including creek bank height and soil build-up or erosion. The Long Mapping group provided a geographical reference for other studies to pinpoint locations at the creek.

Outreach

The Outreach group presents the tasks, results, and accomplishments of the Arcade Creek Project to the wider community and organizes events to educate schoolchildren, politicians, and environmentalists.

Restoration

The Restoration group removed garbage, toxins, and invasive species from Arcade Creek in hopes of restoring it to a more natural state.

Sediment

The Sediment Study monitored the composition of the benthic layer of the creek bed. The presence of an excess of rocks, clay, or silt indicates that the creek's soil is inappropriate for most life at the creek.

Technology

The Technology team was responsible for compiling creek data and publicizing the Arcade Creek Project through informational videos and the Arcade Creek Project website.

Vertebrates

The Vertebrate Study monitored the populations of vertebrate species at the creek. By tracking population changes over time, this study aimed to determine the ecological health of Arcade Creek.
