= Mesa Verde High School =

Location
- 7501 Carriage Drive; Citrus Heights, California 95621; United States
- Coordinates: 38.70204°N 121.29734°W

Information
- Established: 1974
- School district: San Juan Unified School District
- Principal: Jennifer Petersen
- Teaching staff: 45.64 (on an FTE basis)
- Enrollment: 750 (2026–2027)
- Student to teacher ratio: 19.30
- Color
- Team name: Mavericks
- Website: https://mesaverde.sanjuan.edu/

Mesa Verde High School is a public high school in Citrus Heights, California in the San Juan Unified School District.

== Background information ==
Mesa Verde High School opened in March 1975 as a year-around school on a 4-quarter block. Each block was 10-weeks in length, with a 3-week intersession between. In addition to standard academic and elective classes, classes in the construction trades – carpentry; welding; design – and small business entrepreneurship, were offered. Intersession class offered classes for making up credits due to classes that were failed, and supplemental activity classes focusing on outdoor activities. Due to constant conflicts coordinating with the activities and sports programs of other schools on traditional schedules, and with school district professional training programs, the year-around schedule was discontinued in the 1987–1988 school year.

Mesa Verde changed to a traditional August to June two semester schedule from 1987 to 1996. Because of gradual declining enrollment in the San Juan Unified School District (SJUSD), and the small student population creating difficulties in offering wanted elective classes in the school master schedule, a switch was made to a 4x4 block schedule. This allowed students to take 8 classes each full school year, rather than 6 classes under the traditional schedule. It gave Senior students who passed all of their classes and were on track to graduate the opportunity to have two "open periods" their senior year. This allowed them the option to start work, or take classes at local Community Colleges, during their senior year.

The school continues with a 4x4 block schedule, with both the academic classes and elective classes changing regularly, based on School Board approved classes, student needs, staff changes, and community input.

== Current school statistics and programs ==
Around 857 students currently attend Mesa Verde High School.

Mesa Verde has a highly active AVID program, a reading and academic skills program which serves all grade levels at the school. Mesa Verde also provides additional real world work experience (and academic credit) to junior and senior students through the Regional Occupation Program (ROP). A strong business tech and entrepreneurship program trains student to run a small business, and coordinates with local businesses to provide on-the-job training programs designed to prepare students to be business managers.

The school also has a coordinated Fine Arts program, featuring drawing and painting, ceramics, art design, band, choir, and guitar, drama, stage production, and play writing classes that can lead to certificates that provide entry into professional fine arts programs and organizations. The Public Safety program, through classes and mentor training, allows students to gain experience in areas of law enforcement, security services, community assistance, government security agencies, and private investigation services.

Mesa Verde has a strong focus on being the "School of Choice" for the Citrus Height Community. As part of a focus on academics, the school offers nine Advanced Placement and four honors classes, in addition to a full selection of standard academic classes. The Special Education program includes unique Independent Learning Skills (ILS) classes that prepare students with physical, mental, and emotional learning challenges for independent and group home environments post-graduation. Tutoring is available with teachers and instructional assistants at after school sessions for most academic areas.

== Recent improvements ==
In 2004 the school underwent a complete renovation of all campus buildings. This upgraded classrooms, administrative and support areas, and the campus athletic facilities. Mesa Verde celebrated the dedication of the new Gebhardt Gym in September 2009. Mike Gebhardt was the head football coach and athletic director for 31 years. Guests from the community, district, and family of Coach Gebhardt attended the opening. In August 2010 a new library and classroom building was opened, moving the library out of portable trailer buildings and into a dedicated facility. During the summer of 2016, all concrete pathways and asphalt access lanes and roads on campus were replaced to comply with ADA access requirements, and to remove hazards caused by cracking and lifting. A small capacity sports stadium – primarily for football, soccer, and track & field – was completed in the Fall of 2023 as part of the San Juan USD Measure N bond, whose funds are dedicated to district-wide facilities improvements. Other features of the new athletics construction include new tennis courts, upgraded softball and baseball fields, and an expanded school parking area. Bond Measure P, passed in November 2024, will provide funds to implement elements of the District Master Plan that will add additional facilities to the campus.

== School performance ==
In 2020, Mesa Verde HS received a six-year WASC (Western Association of Schools & Colleges) accreditation, with a two-day mid-term visit in 2022.

According to greatschools.org – "This school is rated below average in school quality compared to other schools in California. Students here have below average college readiness measures, this school has below average results in how well it’s serving disadvantaged students, and students perform below average on state tests."

== Athletics ==
Mesa Verde HS plays in the California Division 6 Sierra-Delta League within the California Interscholastic Federation (CIF) Fall Sports: Cross-Country (CoEd), Football, Flag Football, Girls Volleyball; Winter Sports: Girls Basketball, Boys Basketball, Girls Soccer, Boys Soccer, Wrestling (CoEd); Spring Sports: Softball, Baseball, Track & Field (CoEd), Tennis (CoEd), Boys Volleyball.

Championships
Year	Sport	League	League Champion	Sub-Section Champion	Section Champion (Sac-Joaquin)
1978	Wrestling	CVC	X		
1982	Wrestling	CVC	X		
1983	Boys Basketball	SFL	X		
1983	Wrestling	SFL	X		
1986	Football	SFL	X	X	X (D2)
1986	Baseball	SFL	X	X	X (D2)
1987	Baseball	SFL	X	X	X (D2)
1989	Softball	SFL	X		
1989	Boys Track & Field	SFL	X		
1992	Baseball	SFL	X	X	X (D2)
1993	Baseball	SFL	X		
1996	Baseball	SFL	X		
1998	Football	GEL	X	X	X (D3)
1999	Football	GEL	X	X	X (D3)
1999	Girls Basketball	GEL	X (Co-Champs)		
1999	Softball	GEL		X	X (D3)
2000	Boys Basketball	GEL	X		
2001	Football	GEL-East	X (Co-Champs)		
2001	Boys Basketball	GEL-East	X		
2004	Boys Track & Field	GEL-East			X (D3)
2013	Boys Basketball	GEL	X (Co-Champs)		
2019	Boys Golf	GEL	X		

CVC: Capital Valley Conference SFL: Sierra Foothill League GEL: Golden Empire League

== Notable alumni ==
Joe Inglett (Class of 1996) Professional Baseball Player 2008–2011 Cleveland Indians; Toronto Blue Jays; Milwaukee Brewers; Houston Astros
