= Arcade Creek =

Creek in California

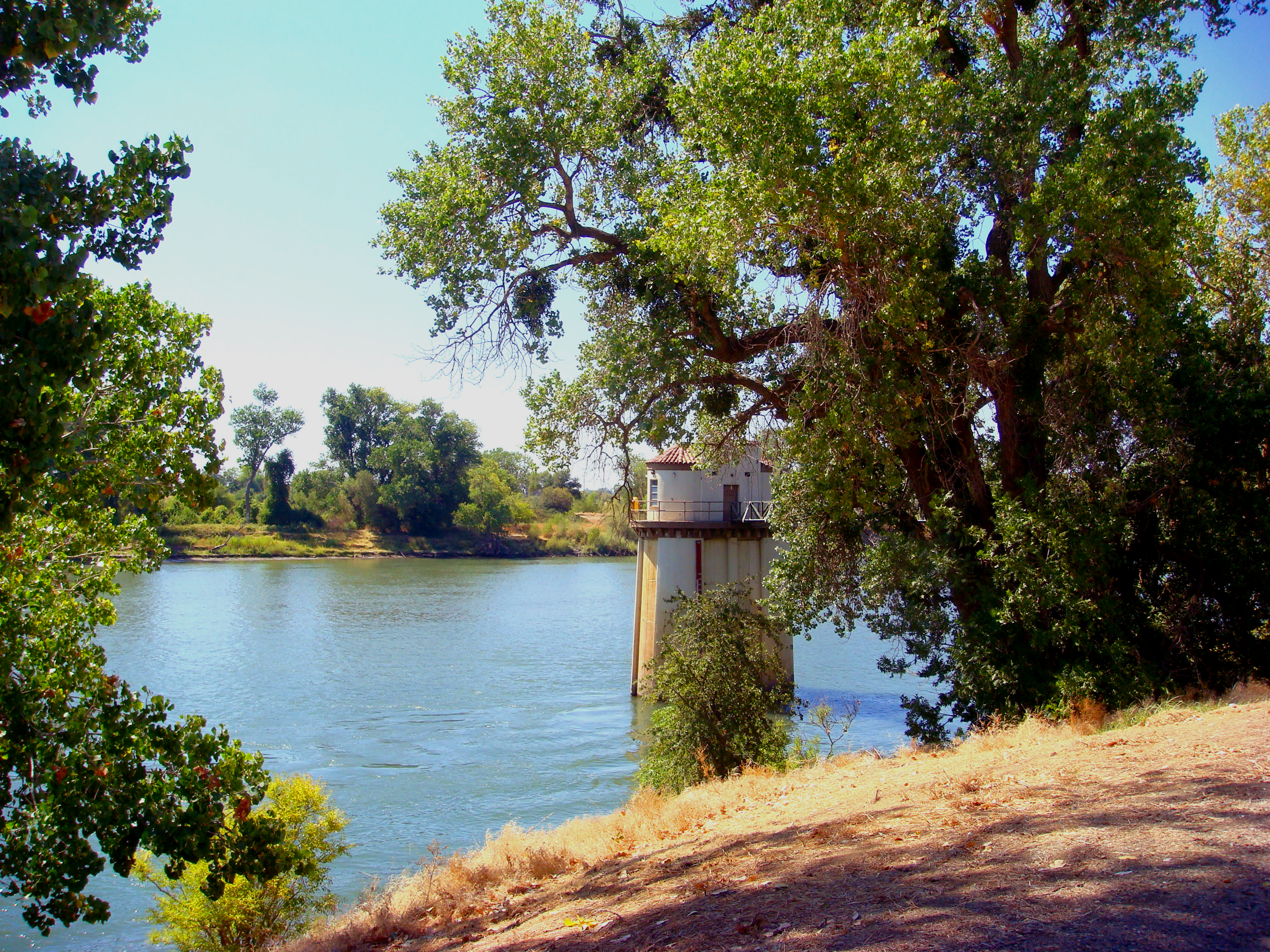
Sacramento River

Arcade Creek is a waterway in Northeastern Sacramento County in central California, United States.

The creek begins in Orangevale, California and flows into the Sacramento River through the Natomas East Main Drainage Canal. It is roughly 16.2 miles long with a basin area of about 29.7 square miles (19,000 acres) and has a floodplain from 120 to 200 feet.

== History ==
Due to archeological finds along Arcade Creek, it has been classified as one of the most important archeological sites in the United States. The erosion of several sediment layers revealed an artifact-bearing layer of dirt nine feet under the top soil layer in one area. This layer yielded 75 artifacts. Researchers link these artifact to the Nisenan People, originally from the Early Horizon period, dating to around 6000 to 3000 BC. The artifacts included flakes and cores of hand stones, cobble-choppers, hammerstones, arrow heads, mortar and pestles. In one area, an ancient Native American sweat house was discovered. This led researchers to believe that the abundance of Bucheye Trees in the area is due to the building of sweat houses and other living structures.

Around 3000 years ago, the Nisenan people settled around Arcade Creek. They chose this area probably due to the abundance of oak trees. The trees provided acorns, shelter, nutrients for vegetation growth and small game. The Arcade creek area was also provided underground vegetation bulbs that could be dug out using sticks.

In the 1800s, Arcade Creek was added to the northernmost Mexican land grants for California. Governor Manuel Micheltorena of Alta California from 1842 to 1845, gave 44,000 acres to Elijah Grimes, who named it Rancho Del Paso.

In the 1860s, during the construction of the Central Pacific Railroad, Arcade creek acquired national fame and central focal point.

Charles Crocker took the first state geologist Josiah Whitney for a ride along the Arcade creek. When Crocker asked Whitney where the entrance to the mountains is, Whitney is quoted saying "Well, the true base is the Sacramento River, but for the purpose of this bill, Arcade Creek is as fair a place as any."

== Specifics ==
Arcade Creek is a small, urbanized watershed that is influenced by water quality problems, moderate flooding due to runoff, street drainage and overflow, all of which has had a significant negative impact on habitat conditions. It is a watershed whose main stretch of creek is about 16.2 miles long and drains about 38 square miles (24,484 acres) of water. It begins in the upper part of Orangevale California, and flows through Sacramento, Roseville, and Citrus Heights. Its main feeder sources include Cripple Creek, Mariposa Creek, South Branch Arcade Creek, San Juan Creek, Brooktree Creek, Coyle Creek, Kohler Creek and Verde Cruze Creek. At approximately 270 feet, and 20 feet at elevation, Arcade Creek flows into Steelhead Creek also referred to as the Natomas East Main Drainage Canal. Arcade Creek was once filled with a biodiversity of small game and native plants, but due to the urbanization of the surrounding areas, it is now mostly surrounded by commercial and residential buildings. There are still a few sections by the creek left untouched, but these sections are heavily influenced and altered by the surrounding land uses.

=== Climate ===
California in general has a Mediterranean climate which means that Arcade Creek has winters that are cool and wet, and hot dry summers. It also receives about 17 to 22 inches of precipitation annually. These spouts of precipitation often occur in the winter season and are short intense water events. Historically, during the summer there were times in which part of the creek would run dry. Due to this, it is believed that the salmonids that inhabited the creek were reaching the top of their fundamental niche and with urbanization eventually were unable to make their way up the creek. Furthermore, due to increase temperatures and industrialization of the surrounding areas, there has been a large reduction of vegetation biodiversity and the vegetation that does grow there is mostly nonnative species.

Storm drains lead into Arcade Creek which in winter causes the creek to swell and flood. It holds street gutter water during the summer, which has led to historically high summer water flows.

In addition, due to the concentrated and quick discharge storm water during summer, and the quick intense precipitation during the winter, the creek experiences high velocity and water flow which leads to further erosion, sedimentation, flooding and channel degradation.

=== Hydrology and Water Quality ===
Over the last 150 years, Arcade Creeks hydrology has changed drastically. Due to infrastructure building, peak flow has increased in volume while the construction of drainage systems and loss of land have decreased volume of depression storage. Both these two factors have caused an increase in peak flows as well as higher scour capacity. In the early years, the creek would run dry in some sections but starting about 45 years ago and due to urbanization, the stream flows perennially. During the summer months low flows run about 2 cubic feet per second (cfs), while the average base flows from between 15 and 20 cfs. During pea flows of intense storm systems, it can be as high or higher than 2,800 cfs. Arcade Creek is prone to flooding due to levees on both sides of the stream between Marysville blvd. and adjoining of Steelhead Creek in addition to constriction of channel flow due to road structures. Because of this during heavy storms and large amounts of precipitation, the golf course northeast and the residential area southeast are prone to flooding. Flooding stage gets reported via automatic sensors located at Scott Road and Deer Creek Crossing. CEQA-mandated a need to implement flood control in which the City of Citrus Heights approved a development plan that would provide three basins with a total of 20 acres that would receive and collect any storm water that spills over the creeks banks. Arcade Creeks groundwater is shallow, about 8 to 15 feet deep in depth, but due to being deeply incised from high flows this shallow groundwater lost. In addition, due to the fact that Arcade Creek has a large volume of urban runoff and drainage into the creek, it is filled with toxic pollutants, fertilizers, bacteria, metals, pesticides, soap, grease, fats, oil and other hydrocarbons. Arcade Creek also experiences high volume of litter and trash due to being surrounded by residential and commercial buildings. For the past 10 years, the USGS and Sacramento River Watershed Program have been monitoring Arcade Creeks water quality. It was found that the dissolved oxygen levels were among the lowest, while containing some of the highest contaminant concentration among the bodies of water tested. In 2001, SRWP determined that Arcade Creek ranked #7 in highest concentration of mercury, while having the highest levels of dissolved copper (4.0 ug/L), highest concentration of Zinc, fourth highest in copper, and third highest in arsenic contamination. In addition, Arcade Creek was found to have the highest number diazinon, chloropyrifos, prometon, and prowl which are strong pesticides. Because Arcade Creek flows into the Sacramento River, which leads to the Sacramento-San Joaquin Delta, and is used as drinking water for over 20 million people toxicity is a major concern.

=== Land Use ===
A majority of the surrounding area of Arcade Creek is residential, commercial and transportation infrastructure. Two major roofed infrastructures that infiltrate Arcade Creek are the Sunrise-Bird cage mall and American River College.

=== Recreational Use ===
In addition to land use, Arcade Creek contains over sixty public parks such as Rusch Community Park, Temp Community Park, and Crosswoods Community Park. One of the most noteworthy parks is the Del Paso Regional Park - the largest public open space. Within Del Paso Park is the Sacramento Horseman's Association that has equestrian trails leading along the creek. There are also forty-six elementary schools, nineteen middle and high schools, and the American River College located within Arcade Creeks boundaries. In addition, there are also three golf courses located within its watershed.

== Biodiversity ==
Before the Gold Rush in 1848, Arcade Creek was filled with a large amount of biodiversity. It included a complex system of perennial grasslands, oak savannahs, seasonal wetlands and riparian forests. It was mostly dominated by blue oaks (Quercus douglasii) and valley oaks (Quercus lobata) but now its patchy sections of wildlife are mostly dominated with cottonwood, willow and Oregon ash. As settlers came and made changes to the environment, oak trees were removed and flora was removed in order to make way for agriculture use and urbanization. The vernal pools and seasonal wetlands all but depleted due to floodplain constriction and water allocation for development. Patchy sections of plant communities exists between developed land, but are now filled with both native (Oak Woodland which include live oak Quercus wislizenii, valley oak, and blue oak and Riparian Forest flora which include Barbara sedge (Carex barbarae), creeping wild rye (Leymus triticoides), and deergrass) and nonnative plants. The nonnative plants are slowly taking over these plots of land as they tend to be more aggressive and abundant. What little patches of wildlife remain are rapidly declining due to bordering land development and recreational uses.

The birds in the Arcade creek area include mallards, wood ducks, red-shouldered hawks, Cooper's hawks, great egrets, belted kingfishers, California quail and acorn woodpeckers.

The native animals include California ground squirrels, western grey squirrels, botta's pocket gophers, beaver, North American river otters, raccoons and striped skunks. Some nonnative species include fox squirrels, black rats, Norway rats, house mice, Virginia Opossums, alligator lizards, sharp-tailed snakes, gopher snakes, pond turtles, western toads, bullfrogs and domestic cats and dogs. Some species that once inhabited the Arcade Creek area include grizzly bears, Tule elk, black-tailed deer, pronghorn antelope, coyotes, ringtails, cottontails and badgers.

Arcade Creek was once a natural spawning site for Chinook salmon and steelhead trout. Neither fish species has observed in the creek for over 20 years due to lack of suitable rearing and spawning habitat. Because Arcade Creek runs into the Sacramento River, which is still a spawning habitat for these species, there is concern about contamination and how the toxicity of Arcade Creek will further affect these fish.

== Restoration ==
There are many restoration acts and plans focused on recovering and maintaining Arcade Creeks natural habitats and wildlife. One major one includes the Arcade Creek Watershed Plan which is focused on enhancing: flood control, water quality, recreation, wildlife and aquatic habitat, land use, public safety, scenic resources, public stewardship and education, fire management and stakeholder collaboration to help improve the watershed overall quality and value.
