= Casa Roble High School =

Casa Roble Fundamental High School

Location
- 9151 Oak Avenue; Orangevale, California 95826; United States; 38.701°N 121.2145°W

Information
- Type: Public
- Established: 1966
- School district: San Juan Unified School District
- Principal: Tanya Baker
- Teaching staff: 54.27 (on an FTE basis)
- Grades: 9-12
- Enrollment: 1,150 (2024–2025)
- Student to teacher ratio: 21.19
- Campus size: Medium
- Campus type: Suburban
- Colors: Navy, silver, and white
- Mascot: Ram
- Website: https://casaroble.sanjuan.edu/

Casa Roble Fundamental High School is a public high school located in Orangevale, California. It is a part of the San Juan Unified School District with a student body of approximately 1150 students from northern Orangevale and a portion of Citrus Heights.

== Academic curriculum ==
Casa Roble uses the 4x4 block schedule in which students have four 90-minute classes per term. This allows for one more class per school year versus the normal seven class, full year schedule. To graduate, a student must pass the Senior Project and earn a total of 280 credits.

Under the "Refuse to Fail" program, implemented in 2008 by principal Christopher Klyse, students with failing grades in classes are required to turn in all work and receive mandatory tutoring until their grades are passing. This was implemented in an effort to improve grades and decrease drop out rates. As of 2011, Refuse to Fail is no longer in use.

Casa Roble offers elective opportunities. The school's yearbook (Rampages) is a predominantly student-run program, they received 2006 H. L. Hall Adviser of the Year. The book is written, designed and photographed exclusively by the student staff, past yearbooks produced by the program have been nationally recognized by both the National Scholastic Press Association and Columbia Scholastic Press Association with multiple Pacemakers, considered the scholastic equivalent to the Pulitzer Prize, and Gold and Silver Crown awards from Columbia University. Casa Radio/TV (CRCN) has also earned an award itself for its "Gameday" segment which offers a little depth into the Casa Roble Varsity Football team each week of the season. It earned third place in the Best of Show category out of hundreds of other schools.

Casa Roble offers numerous Advanced Placement classes including European History, US history, and English. Casa Roble offers classes in two languages: Spanish, and French.

== Extracurricular activities ==
Air Force JROTC - One of the few schools in the area to offer the program.
AVID - AVID

== Notable alumni ==
- Devin Dawson - Singer-songwriter
- Urijah Faber - former professional mixed martial artist, former WEC Champion and UFC bantamweight contender
- David Feiss - animator and creator of Cow and Chicken and I Am Weasel
- Steve Lamson - former professional motocross racer and AMA motocross national champion (1995, 1996)
- Manny Parra - former professional baseball player
- Eric Stuteville - professional basketball player
- Mary Whipple - Olympic medalist
