= Basil Doerhoefer House =

- U.S. National Register of Historic Places
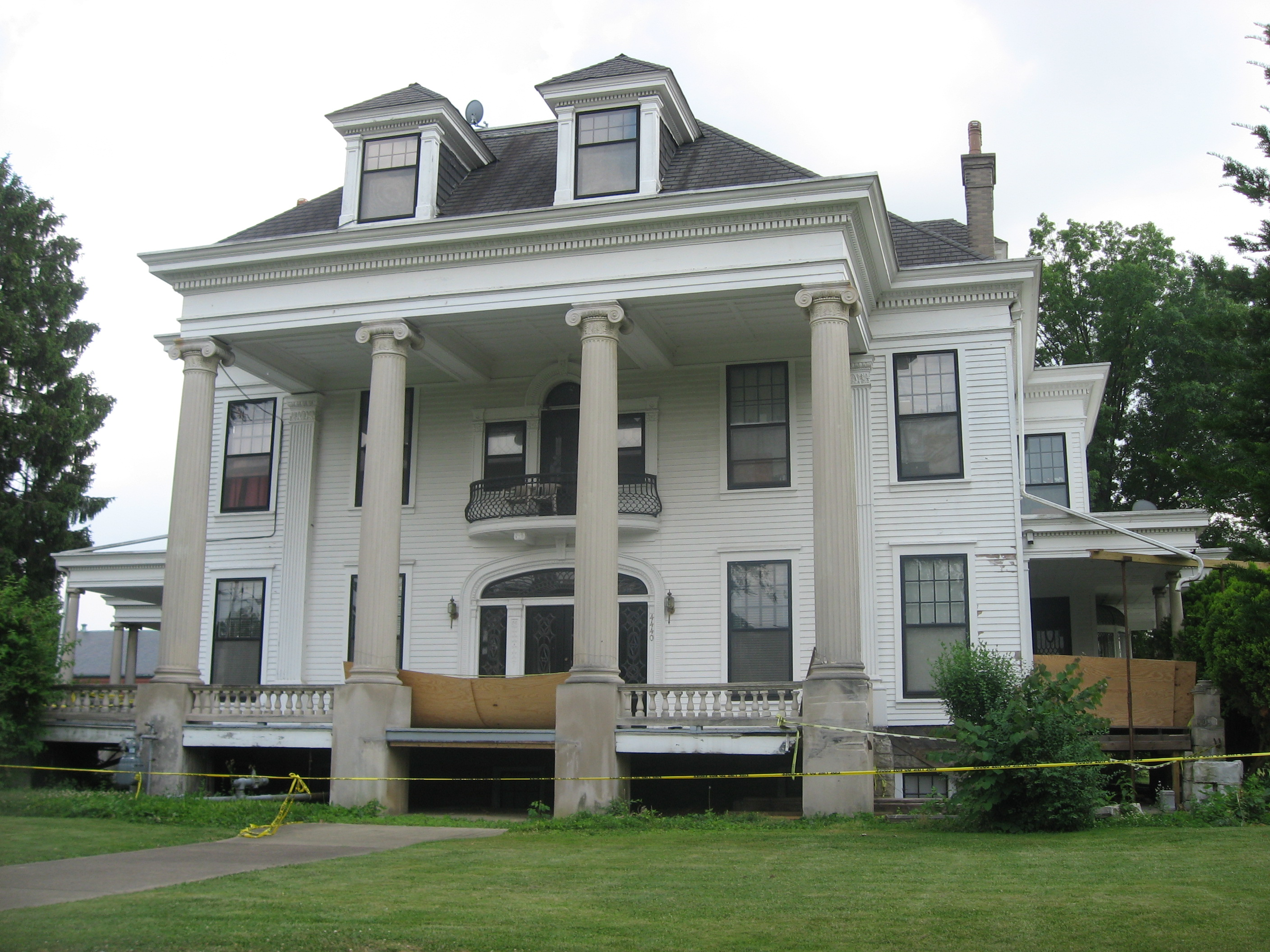

- Location within Kentucky Location within the United States
- Location: 4432 W. Broadway, Louisville, Kentucky
- Coordinates: 38°15′00″N 85°49′34″W
- Area: less than one acre
- Built: 1902
- Architect: D.X. Murphy
- Architectural style: Colonial Revival
- MPS: West Louisville MRA
- NRHP reference No.: 83002657
- Added to NRHP: September 8, 1983

The Basil Doerhoefer House is a Colonial Revival house located at 4432 West Broadway in Louisville, Kentucky. The facade features four monumental columns. It was built in 1902, and added to the National Register of Historic Places in 1983. It was home to Loretto High School.

Basil Doerhofer built a house next door for his son, Peter C. Doerhoefer, in 1918. That also was NRHP-listed, in 1983, as the Peter C. Doerhoefer House.

Prior to moving to the Basil Doerhoefer House on Broadway the Doerhoefers lived in the Doerhoefer-Hampton House at 2422 West Chestnut Street in Louisville.

In 1981 the house was owned by "Christ Temple Apostolic Church, Inc." and signage at the house in 2022 suggests it still is. It is presumably associated with the Christ Temple Christian Life Center, whose main building was added to what was then Loretto High School, is around the corner at 723 S. 45th St.

== See also ==
- National Register of Historic Places listings in Louisville's West End
