= El Camino Fundamental High School =

Location
- 4300 El Camino Avenue; Arden-Arcade, Sacramento County, California 95873; United States; 38.60953°N 121.36184°W

Information
- School type: Public, high school
- Established: 1951; 75 years ago
- School district: San Juan Unified School District
- Principal: Evelyn Welborn
- Teaching staff: 55.94 (FTE)
- Gender: Coeducational
- Enrollment: 1,296 (2023-2024)
- Student to teacher ratio: 23.17
- Colors: Kelly Green; White; Black
- Athletics: Baseball • basketball • cross country • football • golf • soccer • softball • swimming • tennis • track & field • volleyball • water polo • wrestling
- Athletics conference: Golden Empire League
- Mascot: Eagle
- Newspaper: The Eagle Eye
- Yearbook: The Aerie
- Website: elcamino.sanjuan.edu
- Last updated: August 17, 2024; 2 years ago

El Camino Fundamental High School is a public high school in Arden-Arcade, California, near Sacramento. It is part of the San Juan Unified School District. Built in 1951 as El Camino High School, "Fundamental" was added to the name in the late 1970s to signify the school's intention to focus upon basic (fundamental) characteristics of successful schools, in particular a return to a strong disciplinary emphasis, a stripped-down college preparatory curriculum, and a contract-supported, enroll-through-application-only process.

== Curriculum ==
The school offers 18 Advanced Placement courses. and eight Honors Courses. The four CTE (Career and Technical Education) pathways at El Camino Fundamental High School are EPI (Eagle Polytechnic Institute), Healthcare, Media Arts, and Theater Arts.

== El Camino Band ==
El Camino Fundamental High School has four academic bands and one Pep Band.

== El Camino Choir ==
Choral Director David Vanderbout, a 2005 graduate of El Camino High School, led the school's choirs from 2012 to 2022. He led a beginning choir, and intermediate choir, and an advanced Jazz choir. He has since left to teach at Jesuit High School.

== El Camino Theatre ==
El Camino Fundamental High School offers two theatrical classes, Beginning, and Advanced Drama. The program has also put on 3 productions every year while offering students the option of being a part of the cast or crew.

== EPI (Eagle Polytechnic Institute) ==
The EPI program is for 10th-12th students who wish to have a different high school experience. EPI is a California Partnership Academy that runs as a School within a School format. EPI students share 2-4 classes with each other every year. These classes strive to feature cross-curricular core content and activities focused around manufacturing and engineering.

== Academic Decathlon ==
El Camino won the Sacramento County Academic Decathlon back-to-back in 1984 and 1985.

== Sports ==
Several El Camino Fundamental High School's has numerous sports teams. The school competes in the Golden Empire League.

== Principals ==
Evelyn Welborn is the current principal of the school. Shelley Friery, formerly a vice principal of the school, served as principal until 2017, having served since 2013. Jill Spears, formerly a vice principal at the school, was the principal until 2013, having served since 2010. Michael Stockdale, formerly a vice principal at Woodcreek High School in Roseville, CA was the principal from 2007 to 2010. Ernest Boone, formerly the principal at River City High School in West Sacramento, CA and Vacaville High School in Vacaville, CA was the principal of El Camino from 1993 to 2007.

== Notable alumni ==
- Andy Allo – singer and songwriter
- Mike Burton - Olympic gold medalist swimmer
- Jessica Chastain – Academy-Award-winning actress (dropped out)
- Claude "Butch" Lee Edge – former MLB pitcher
- Josh Emmett - former El Camino wrestler, professional MMA fighter signed with UFC
- Michael Faulkender – professor of finance at the Robert H. Smith School of Business at the University of Maryland and former Deputy Secretary of the Treasury.
- Mandisa Hundley – singer
- Laura Ingle – correspondent for Fox News Channel
- Phil Isenberg – state assemblyman and former Sacramento mayor
- Christina Kahrl – co-founder of Baseball Prospectus, editor for ESPN.com, and member of the Baseball Writers' Association of America
- Victor Kim – former member of Quest Crew, winners of MTV's 3rd season of America's Best Dance Crew
- Derrek Lee (1993) – former MLB first baseman
- Kate Levering – actress
- Larry Linville – Major Frank Burns in the television series M*A*S*H
- Malati Dasi (born Melanie Lee Nagel) – first international female leader of the Hare Krishna movement
- Tim Wheeler – professional baseball player; was the 2011Texas League home run champion.
