= San Juan High School (California) =

Location
- 7551 Greenback Lane; Citrus Heights, California 95610; United States; 38.67898°N 121.28758°W

Information
- NCES School ID: 05817
- Principal: David Levis
- Staff: 35.22 (FTE)
- Enrollment: 570 (2023-2024)
  - Grade 9: 137
  - Grade 10: 148
  - Grade 11: 146
  - Grade 12: 139
- Student to teacher ratio: 16.18
- Color
- Team name: Spartans
- Yearbook: Greenback Notes
- Graduates (2015-16): 153
- Website: San Juan High

San Juan High School is an American public high school in Citrus Heights, California in the San Juan Unified School District.

== History ==
The community of Citrus Heights realized in 1911 that there was a need for a four-year high school in the area, and San Juan High School (then known as the Grammar School) began in a small building located in the town of Fair Oaks. In 1913, the San Juan Union High School District was organized. This district was composed of the Sylvan, Orangevale, Fair Oaks, Roberts, and San Juan Districts. 46 students were enrolled in the Grammar School during the 1913–1914 school year, of which 41 were freshmen. Dorothy Gertrude Jerauld, the first student to complete studies at the Grammar School, graduated in June 1914.

After Citrus Heights' founder Walter Trainor donated land, construction began on a new school at the current location off of Greenback Lane in 1915. An influx of students from around the Sacramento area, Folsom included, increased enrollment to 92 students. The original building was expanded in 1938, when work was completed on the "A" and "B" wings of San Juan High School, and two years later, enrollment had increased to 400 students. The older portions of the school had fallen into disrepair, but began to be used again at this time. More wings were added after World War II, and a shop and gymnasium were also added. Approximately 600 students currently attend the school.

The San Juan Alumni Association was formed in 1980 and had 1,100 dues paying members as of 2011.

== Current news ==
As of 2026 they have now also updated the field to reflect the needs of the school as well as the wishes of the SJUSD.

Running a Student Ambassador Program they recently won the district [SJUSD's] Spirit of San Juan award.
