= Orangevale, California =

Orangevale
- census-designated place
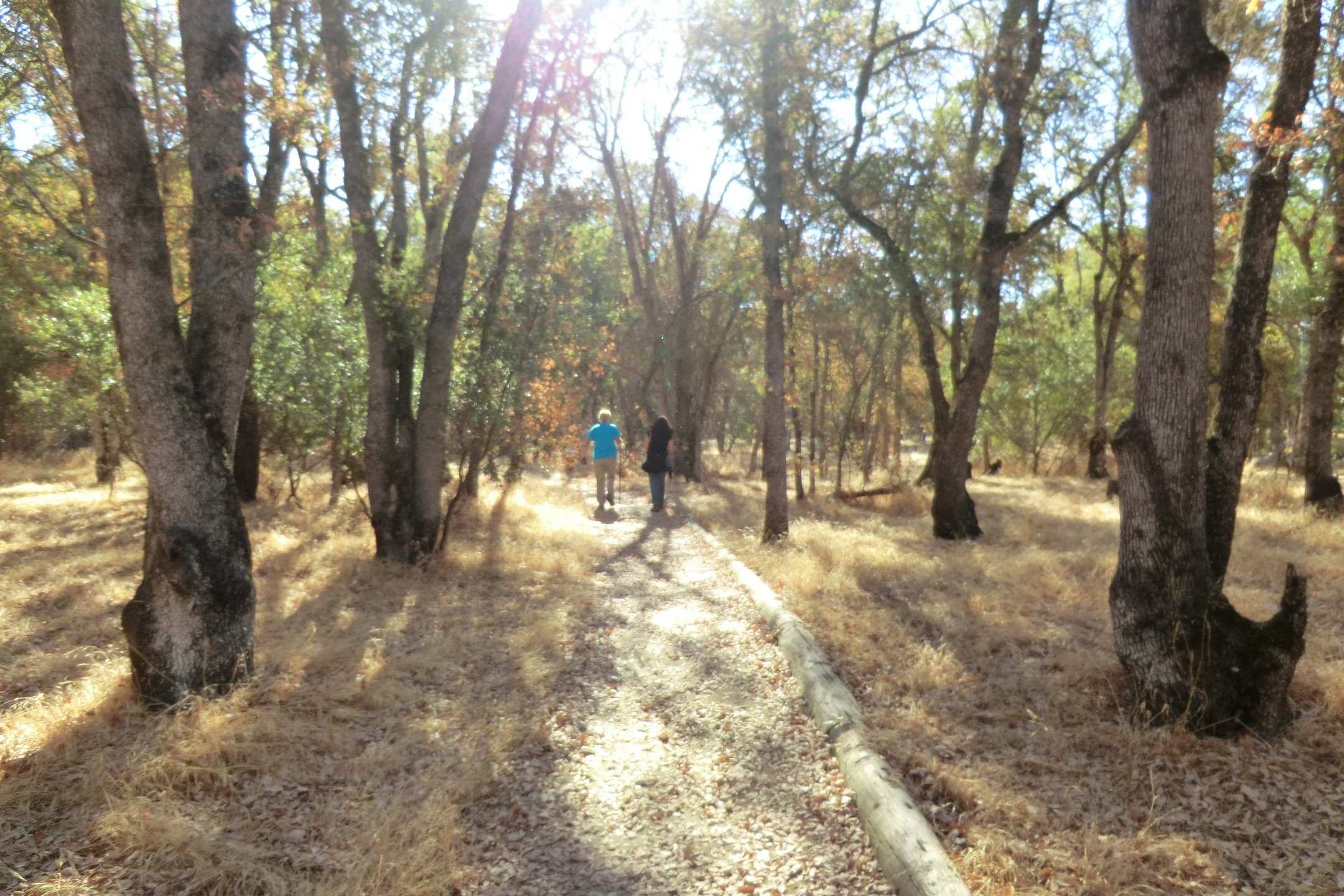
- Orangevale Community Park
- Interactive map of Orangevale
- Location in California Location in the United States
- Coordinates: 38°40′55″N 121°12′50″W
- Country: United States
- State: California
- County: Sacramento

Area
  - Total: 11.605 sq mi (30.06 km^{2})
  - Land: 11.451 sq mi (29.66 km^{2})
  - Water: 0.154 sq mi (0.40 km^{2}) 1.33%
- Elevation: 240 ft (73 m)

Population (2020)
  - Total: 35,569
  - Density: 3,106.2/sq mi (1,199.3/km^{2})
- Time zone: UTC-8 (PST)
  - Summer (DST): UTC-7 (PDT)
- ZIP code: 95662
- Area codes: 916, 279
- FIPS code: 06-54092
- GNIS feature ID: 1656200

Orangevale is a census-designated place (CDP) in Sacramento County, California, United States. It is part of the Sacramento metropolitan area. The population was 35,569 at the 2020 census, up from 33,960 at the 2010 census. It is located approximately 25 miles (40 km) northeast of Sacramento.

== Geography ==
Orangevale is located at 38°40′55″N 121°12′50″W (38.681903, -121.213824).

According to the United States Census Bureau, the CDP has a total area of 11.6 square miles (30 km^{2}), of which 11.5 square miles (30 km^{2}) is land and 0.1 square miles (0.26 km^{2}) (1.33%) is water.

Orangevale is primarily rolling hills near the base of the Sierra Nevada Foothills.

== Demographics ==
=== 2020 census ===
As of the 2020 census, Orangevale had a population of 35,569 and a population density of 3,106.2 inhabitants per square mile (1,199.3/km^{2}). The census reported that 99.1% of the population lived in households, 0.5% lived in non-institutionalized group quarters, and 0.4% were institutionalized. 100.0% of residents lived in urban areas and 0.0% lived in rural areas.

The median age was 42.5 years. 20.5% of residents were under the age of 18, 7.3% were aged 18 to 24, 25.0% were aged 25 to 44, 27.5% were aged 45 to 64, and 19.6% were 65 years of age or older. For every 100 females there were 96.4 males, and for every 100 females age 18 and over there were 94.6 males.

There were 13,545 households; 29.3% had children under the age of 18 living in them and 6.8% were cohabiting couple households. Of all households, 52.3% were married-couple households, 16.5% had a male householder with no spouse or partner present, and 24.5% had a female householder with no spouse or partner present. About 22.1% of all households were made up of individuals and 10.2% had someone living alone who was 65 years of age or older. The average household size was 2.6, and there were 9,614 families (71.0% of households).

There were 13,990 housing units at an average density of 1,221.7 units per square mile (471.7 units/km^{2}), of which 96.8% were occupied. Of the occupied units, 74.0% were owner-occupied and 26.0% were renter-occupied; the homeowner vacancy rate was 0.7% and the rental vacancy rate was 5.4%.

Racial composition as of the 2020 census
Race	Number	Percent
White	27,616	77.6%
Black or African American	595	1.7%
American Indian and Alaska Native	303	0.9%
Asian	1,275	3.6%
Native Hawaiian and Other Pacific Islander	90	0.3%
Some other race	1,375	3.9%
Two or more races	4,315	12.1%
Hispanic or Latino (of any race)	4,645	13.1%

=== 2023 ACS 5-year estimates ===
In 2023, the US Census Bureau estimated that 8.6% of the population were foreign-born. Of all people aged 5 or older, 87.6% spoke only English at home, 4.9% spoke Spanish, 4.7% spoke other Indo-European languages, 1.9% spoke Asian or Pacific Islander languages, and 1.0% spoke other languages. Of those aged 25 or older, 93.4% were high school graduates and 30.6% had a bachelor's degree.

The median household income in 2023 was $98,158, and the per capita income was $44,740. About 6.4% of families and 9.2% of the population were below the poverty line.

=== 2010 census ===
The 2010 United States census reported that Orangevale had a population of 33,960. The population density was 2,915.9 inhabitants per square mile (1,125.8/km^{2}). The racial makeup of Orangevale was 27,881 (80.9%) White, 543 (0.1%) African American, 848 (2.5%) Asian, 924 (2.7%) from Two or More Races, 309 (0.9%) Native American, 91 (0.3%) Native Hawaiian or Other Pacific Islander, and 3,324 (9.6%) Hispanic or Latino.

The Census reported that 33,742 people (99.4% of the population) lived in households, 115 (0.3%) lived in non-institutionalized group quarters, and 103 (0.3%) were institutionalized.

There were 12,816 households, out of which 4,277 (33.4%) had children under the age of 18 living in them, 6,900 (53.8%) were opposite-sex married couples living together, 1,473 (11.5%) had a female householder with no husband present, 717 (5.6%) had a male householder with no wife present. There were 761 (5.9%) unmarried opposite-sex partnerships, and 80 (0.6%) same-sex married couples or partnerships. 2,832 households (22.1%) were made up of individuals, and 1,094 (8.5%) had someone living alone who was 65 years of age or older. The average household size was 2.63. There were 9,090 families (70.9% of all households); the average family size was 3.07.

The age distribution of Orangevale was as follows: 7,785 people (22.9%) were under the age of 18, 2,877 people (8.5%) aged 18 to 24, 8,296 people (24.4%) aged 25 to 44, 10,479 people (30.9%) aged 45 to 64, and 4,523 people (13.3%) who were 65 years of age or older. The median age was 40.7 years. For every 100 females, there were 97.4 males. For every 100 females age 18 and over, there were 94.5 males.

There were 13,583 housing units at an average density of 1,166.3 per square mile (450.3/km^{2}), of which 9,414 (73.5%) were owner-occupied, and 3,402 (26.5%) were occupied by renters. The homeowner vacancy rate was 1.8%; the rental vacancy rate was 7.9%. 25,032 people (73.7% of the population) lived in owner-occupied housing units and 8,710 people (25.6%) lived in rental housing units.

== Politics ==
In the state legislature, Orangevale is in the 6th Senate District, represented by Republican Roger Niello, and is in California's 7th Assembly District.

Federally, Orangevale is in California's 3rd congressional district, represented by Independent Kevin Kiley.

== History ==
Originally Orange Vale Colony, the community began as part of the 1844 Rancho San Juan Mexican land grant. The area was rural and home to numerous orange groves. Oak trees (remnants of which can be seen in the Orangevale Park) were common, as were trails made by Maidu Native Americans many years before. In addition to orange groves, several olive orchards were also once in the area, and some original trees can still be found along Chestnut, Orangevale, Main, and Walnut Avenues.

== Education ==
Public schools in Orangevale are under the jurisdiction of the San Juan Unified School District. Elementary schools include Trajan Fundamental Elementary, Green Oaks Fundamental Elementary, Oakview Elementary, Pershing Elementary, Twin Lakes Elementary, and Ottomon Elementary. Orangevale is served by two junior highs; Louis Pasteur and Andrew Carnegie. Casa Roble Fundamental High School is the primary high school for the area, with some southern Orangevale residents attending Bella Vista nearby Fair Oaks.

== Transportation ==
Orangevale can be reached from the following freeway exits:

Interstate 80: Greenback Lane (Exit 98, 6 miles east of the exit), Sierra College Boulevard (Exit 109, 9 miles south of the exit)

U.S. Route 50: Hazel Avenue (Exit 21, 3 miles north of the exit)

Public transportation is provided by the Sacramento Regional Transit. One local route (Route 24) is available Mondays to Fridays from Sunrise Mall in Citrus Heights. One express bus (Route 109) is available only Mondays to Fridays travels directly to Downtown Sacramento via U.S. Route 50. These routes follow the commute direction to Sacramento in the morning, and vice versa in the afternoon. The closest light rail stations are the Historic Folsom station (3 miles) and Hazel station (4 miles).

In addition, Folsom Stage Lines of Folsom takes passengers from the Sacramento Regional Transit's Historic Folsom light rail station to a bus stop that serves Route 24 of Sacramento Regional Transit.

== Notable people ==
- Ryan Cordell, MLB outfielder over parts of three seasons
- Devin Dawson, singer
- Steve Lamson, former professional motocross racer and AMA motocross national champion (1995, 1996)
- Jim McClarin, politician
- Eric Stuteville, basketball player
- Mary Whipple, coxswain for the U.S. women's rowing team. She and her team won gold at the 2008 Summer Olympics and silver at the 2004 Summer Olympics
- Theresa Knorr, convicted murderer
