= Phoenix Vernal Pools =

Park

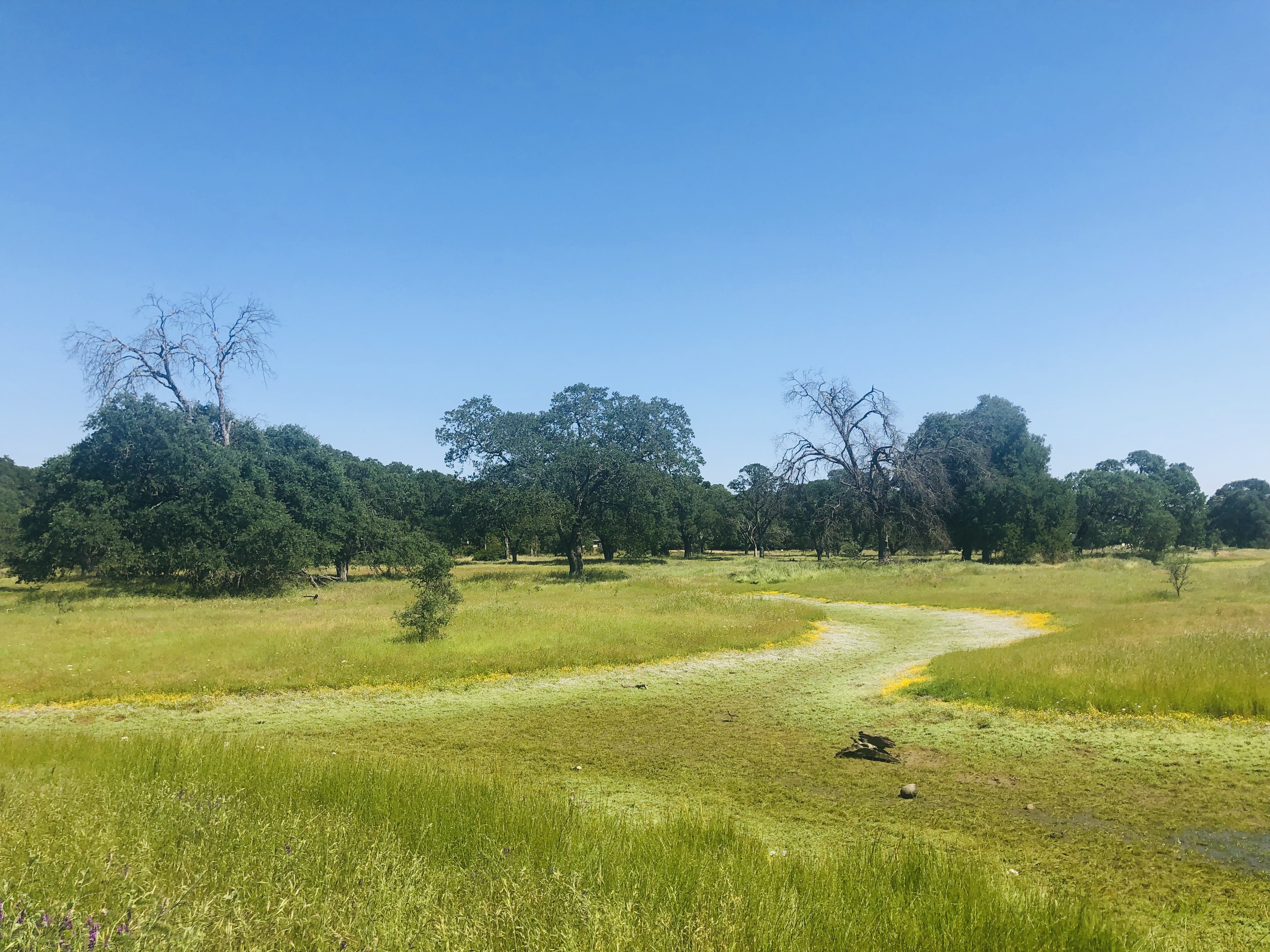
- Phoenix Vernal Pool in bloom
- Interactive map of Phoenix Vernal Pools
- Type: A form of a wetland with seasonal pools of water
- Location: Fair Oaks, California
- Coordinates: 38°39′09.4″N 121°13′06.1″W
- Area: 23 acres (9.3 ha)
- Created: 1979
- Operator: California Department of Fish and Wildlife and Fair Oaks Park District

The Phoenix Vernal Pools are located in Fair Oaks, California, a suburb of Sacramento city around 20 miles east of the city of Sacramento and north of highway 50. This land consists of seasonally inundated wetlands that form after winter rains. The climate type of Phoenix Vernal Pools is classified as Mediterranean, receiving 24 in (610 mm) of rain per year. The rainwater percolates into the soil until it reaches an impermeable hardpan that causes an elevated water table, forming the vernal pools. The Phoenix Vernal Pool ecosystem is relatively unique as is supports many species of fauna and flora endemic to vernal pools.

== Background ==
The Phoenix Vernal Pools consist of two separately managed areas: Phoenix Field Ecological Reserve (PFER) and the Phoenix Park Vernal Pool Preserve (PPVPP), collectively referred to as the Phoenix Vernal Pools (PVP). The PFER parcel is an 8 acres (3.2 ha) area of land owned by the California Department of Fish and Game and designated as a mitigation site to counteract the nearby home development. There is no public access to the PFER. The PPVPP parcel is managed by the Fair Oaks Recreation & Parks District, consisting of 15 acres (6.1 ha) designated to conserve vernal pool habitat for the Sacramento orcutt grass, Orcuttia viscida, and to preserve the last remaining vernal pools in the area for community enjoyment. The PPVPP also consists of areas designated for public use, such as baseball diamonds, playing fields, parking lots, roads, and trails. These vernal pools are positioned on a high terrace approximately 160 ft (49 m) above the north bank of the American River. Their elevation ranges from 271 to 280 ft (83 to 85 m) above sea level. They are classified as northern hardpan vernal pools. The Phoenix Vernal Pools are located in a Mediterranean climate, receiving 24 in (610 mm) of rain annually, which is ideal for vernal pool development. The soils of PVP are classified as Redding gravelly loam which is described as moderately deep and well-drained with a surface layer that is typically 7 in (180 mm) of gravelly loam and the upper 13 in (330 mm) of subsoil consists of loam and gravelly loam. This soil series contains soils below the surface layer (claypan of gravelly clay and silica-cemented hardpan) that are nearly impermeable during the wet season causing the development of a perched water table, or vernal pool.

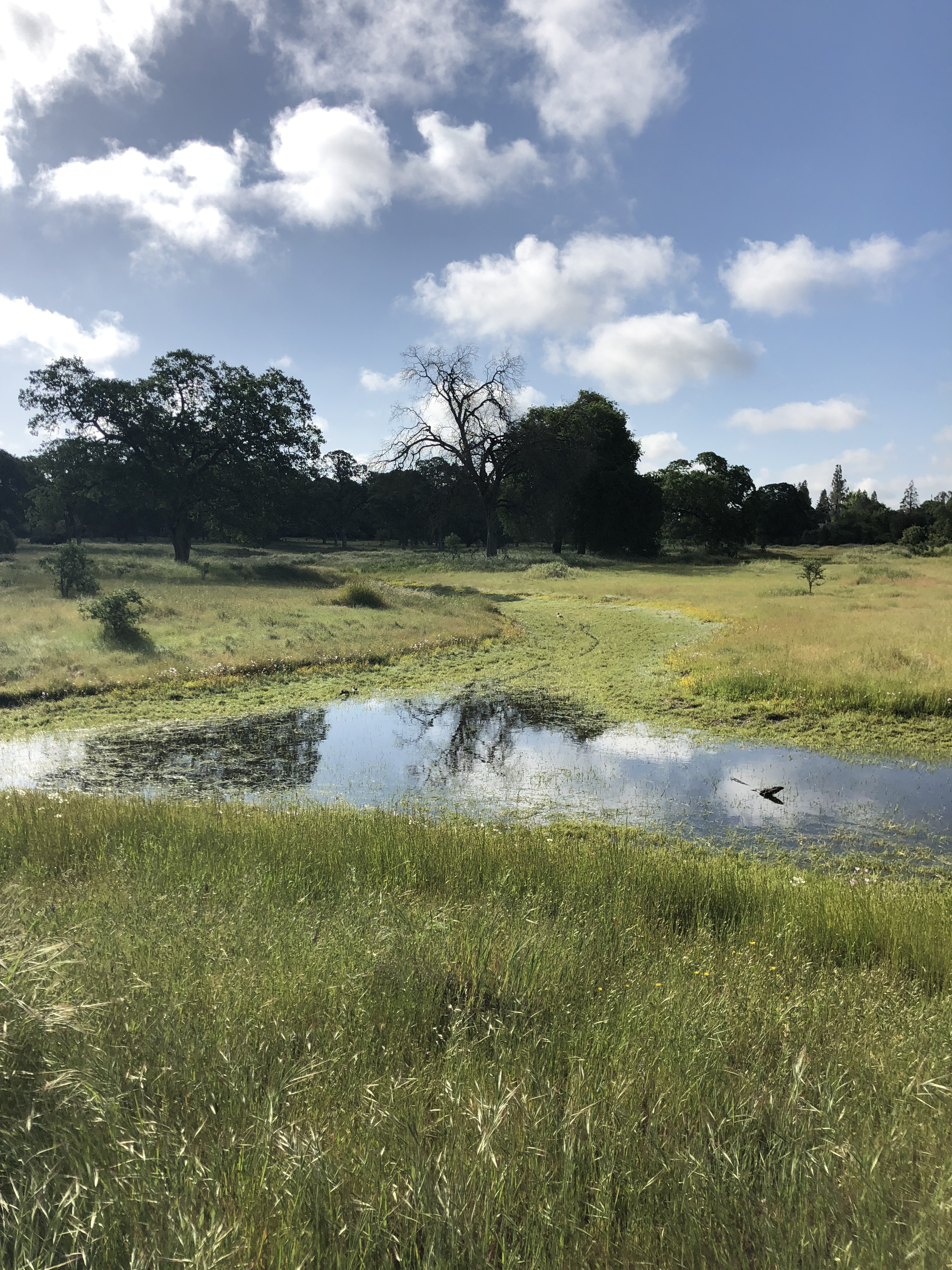
Phoenix Vernal Pool

== Hydrology ==
Offsite irrigation impacts the Phoenix Vernal Pools hydrology. Currently, surface and groundwater drainage onto the PFER from the north and east are intercepted by a drain system that runs along the entire northern and eastern boundaries. The east drain was developed in the late 1970s and the north drain was installed in 1998 to prevent summer irrigation from converting the vernal pools into seasonal wetlands. This drainage system is vital in keeping the vernal pools from developing into seasonal wetlands, without experiencing a dry season. Phoenix Vernal Pools receive most of their water from rainfall, and are considered hydrologically isolated because they aren't permanently connected to a body of water. The water levels of Phoenix Vernal Pools fluctuate every year but typically reach their highest in the spring after heavy rainfall.

== Monitoring and adaptive management ==
The California Department of Fish and Game established monitoring and adaptive management plans to ensure the long-term protection of the wildlife and the land itself. The monitoring of the Phoenix Vernal Pools takes place through the record keeping of Sacramento Orcutt Grass, Pincushion Navarretia, and the Vernal Pools and Swales in general. Sacramento Orcutt Grass is monitored closely because of its status as an endangered species under the California and Federal Endangered Species Acts, and is also listed as a Category 1B plant (defined as “Rare, threatened, or endangered in California and elsewhere”) by the California Native Plant Society (CNPS). As a part of CDFG's monitoring plan, they photograph and map the occurrence of Sacramento Orcutt Grass annually. After the original photograph of Sacramento Orcutt Grass is taken, the one that follows a year later shows if it is still in occurrence. This allows them to map the presence and extent of the Sacramento Orcutt Grass. Then they are able to estimate the distribution and population size of Orcuttia viscida. They monitor the presence of invasive species and rainfall data to determine if precipitation impacts the presence of the Phoenix Vernal Pool's native flora. They also state in their monitoring and adaptive management plan to note the presence of any obvious changes or impacts (such as summer irrigation) to the vernal pools and swales in order to prepare for adaptive management.

== Flora and fauna ==
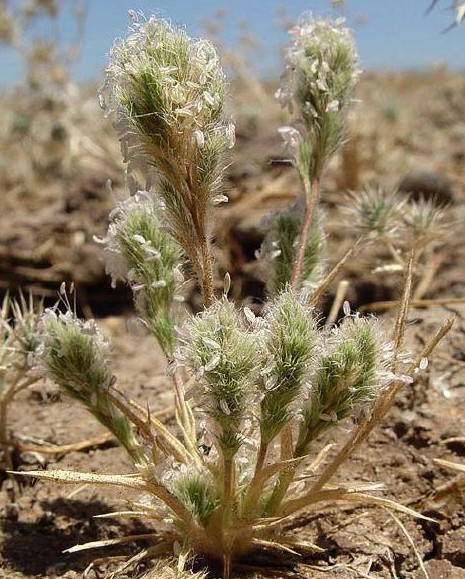
Sacramento orcutt grass is an endangered, endemic species of Sacramento County found in Phoenix Vernal Pools. This species was a driver of the development of the Phoenix Park Vernal Pool Preserve.

=== Condensed inventory of flora found in Phoenix Vernal Pools ===
- Orcuttia viscida
- Navarretia intertexta
- Bromus diandrus
- Avena fatua
- Andropogon virginicus var. virginicus
- Briza minor
- Eleocharis macrostachya
- Downingia concolor
- Lasthenia fremontii
- Lasthenia glaberrima
- Psilocarphus brevissimus
- Plagiobothrys nothofulvus
- Chlorogalum pomeridianum
- Dipterostemon capitatus
- Thysanocarpus curvipes
- Pogogyne zizyphoroides
- Triteleia laxa
- Triphysaria eriantha
- Amsinckia menziesii var. intermedia
- Eschscholzia californica
- Vicia villosa
- Mimulus tricolor
- Lupinus bicolor

=== Condensed inventory of fauna found in Phoenix Vernal Pools ===
- Cypridinae
- Daphniidae
- Diaptomidae
- Bufo boreas halophilus
- Hyla regilla
- Sceloporus occidentalis
- Thamnophis sirtalis fitchi
- Buteo jamaicensis
- Carpodacus mexicanus
- Cathartes aura
- Aphelocoma californica
- Pica nuttali
- Melanerpes formicivorus
- Zenaida macroura
- Zonotrichia leucophrys
- Lepus californicus
- Odocoileus hemionus
- Scapanus latimanus
- Sciurus griseus
- Sorex sp.
- Spermophilus beecheyi
- Thomomys sp.
