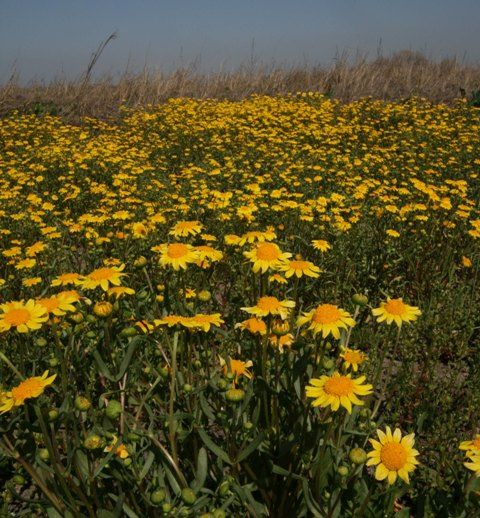

Scientific classification
- Kingdom: Plantae
- Clade: Tracheophytes
- Clade: Angiosperms
- Clade: Eudicots
- Clade: Asterids
- Order: Asterales
- Family: Asteraceae
- Genus: Lasthenia
- Species: L. ferrisiae

Binomial name
- Lasthenia ferrisiae Ornduff

= Lasthenia ferrisiae =

Species of flowering plant

Lasthenia ferrisiae is a species of flowering plant in the family Asteraceae known by the common name Ferris' goldfields. It is endemic to the California Central Valley, where it grows in vernal pools and alkali flats.

== Description ==
Lasthenia ferrisiae is an annual herb approaching a maximum height of 40 centimeters. It is variable in appearance and similar to other species of goldfields (Lasthenia); it is probably the result of a cross between Lasthenia chrysantha and Lasthenia glabrata, which grow throughout its range. The stem may be branched or not and it bears hairless, linear leaves that are up to 8 centimeters long.

Atop the hairless or sparsely hairy stems are inflorescences of flower heads with fused, hairless phyllaries. The head contains many yellow disc florets with a fringe of small yellow ray florets.

The fruit is a flat, oval-shaped achene up to about 2 millimeters long.
