= L. maritima =

L. maritima may refer to:

- Lasthenia maritima, the maritime goldfield, a flowering plant species
- Lobularia maritima, the sweet alyssum or sweet alison, a plant species

== See also ==
- Maritima (disambiguation)
