= L. californica =

L. californica may refer to:

- Lasthenia californica, the California goldfield, a flowering plant species native to California and Oregon
- Lophelia californica, a synonym for Lophelia pertusa, a cold-water coral species which grows in the deep waters throughout the North Atlantic Ocean

== See also ==
- List of Latin and Greek words commonly used in systematic names § C
