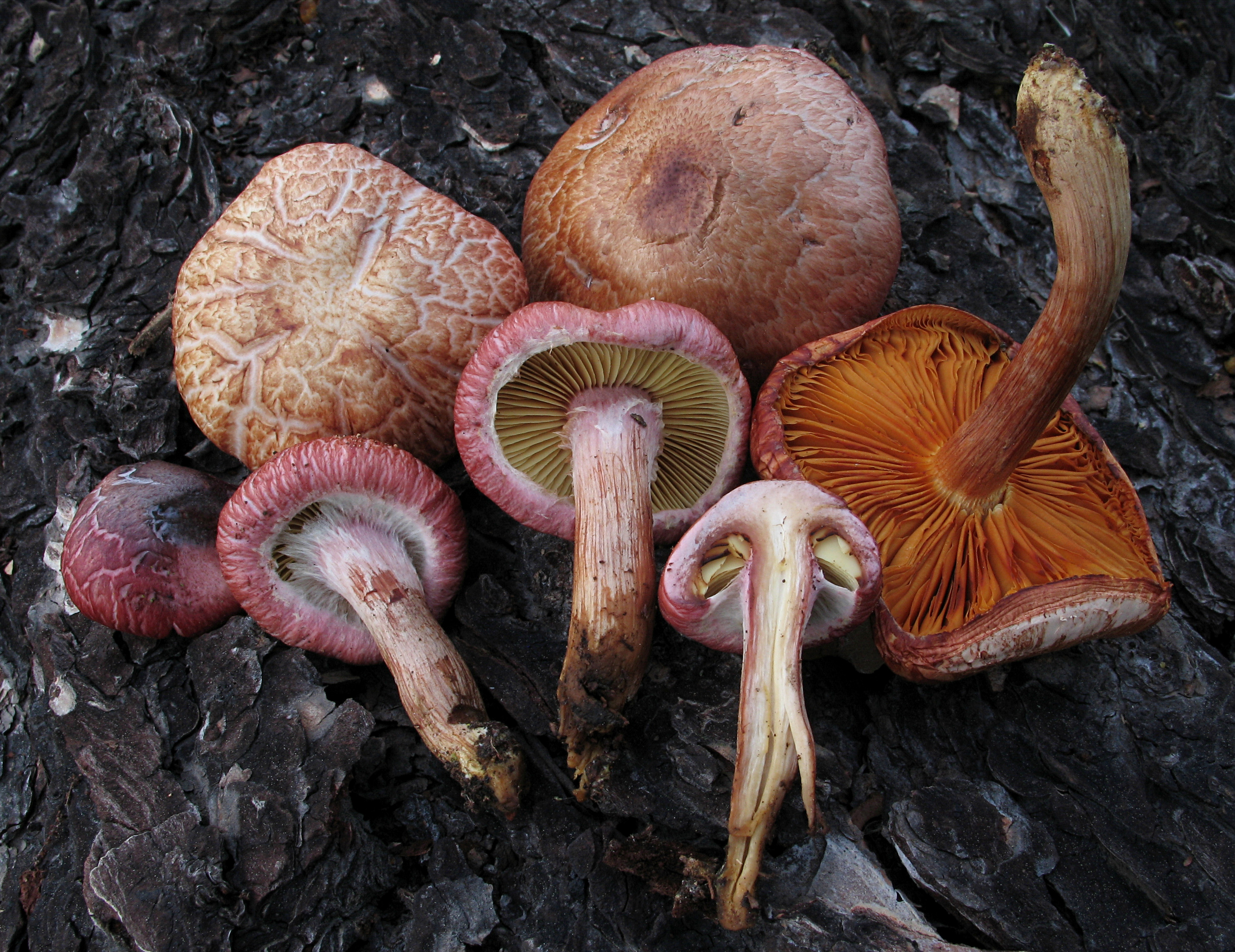
- in Fair Oaks, California, United States

Scientific classification
- Kingdom: Fungi
- Division: Basidiomycota
- Class: Agaricomycetes
- Order: Agaricales
- Family: Hymenogastraceae
- Genus: Gymnopilus
- Species: G. thiersii

Binomial name
- Gymnopilus thiersii M.T. Seidl

= Gymnopilus thiersii =

Species of mushroom

Gymnopilus thiersii Mycological characteristics
- Gills on hymenium
- Cap is convex
- Hymenium is adnexed or adnate
- Ecology is saprotrophic
- Edibility is psychoactive

Gymnopilus thiersii is a species of mushroom in the family Hymenogastraceae.

== See also ==
- List of Gymnopilus species
