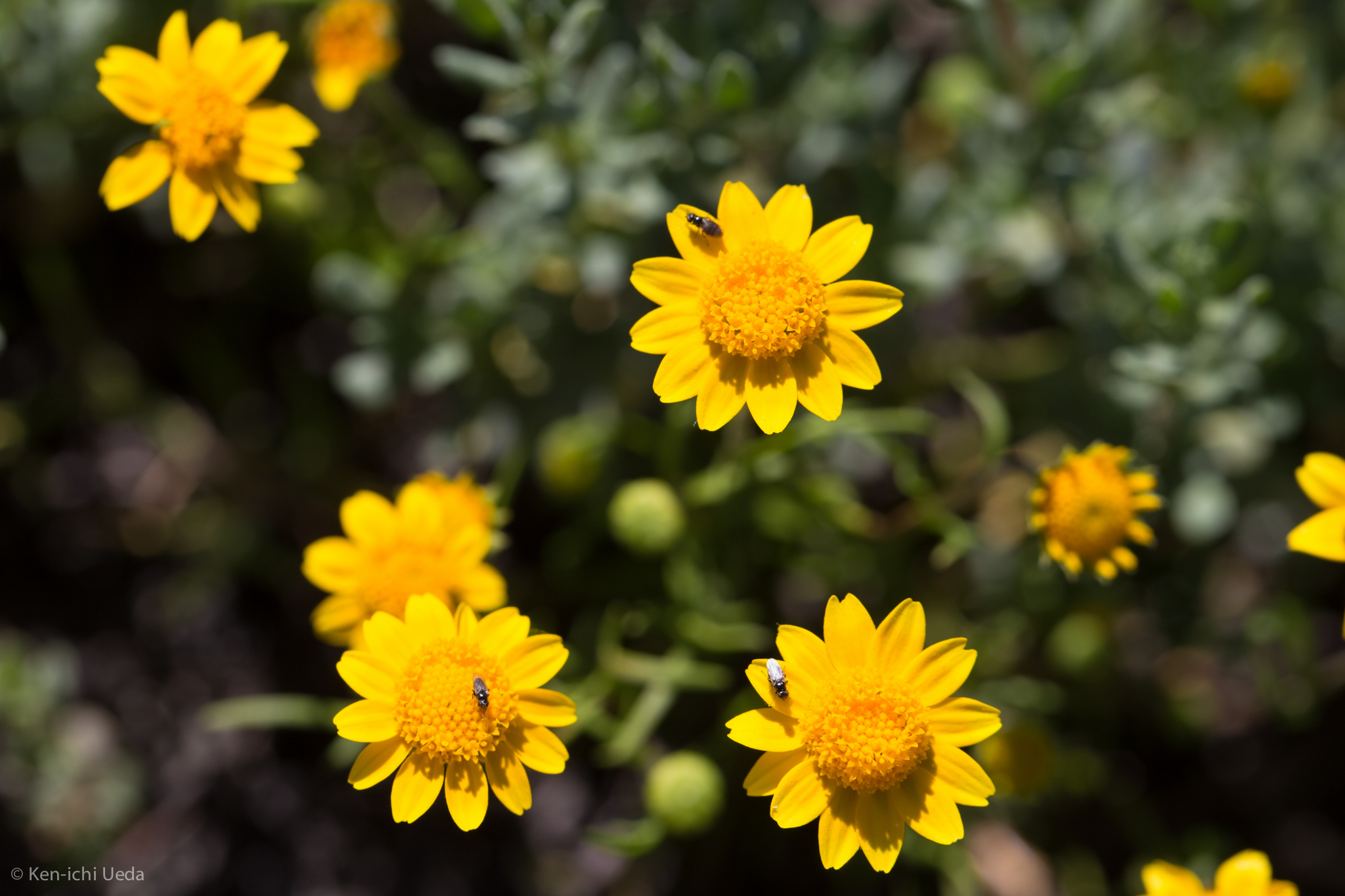

Conservation status
- Critically Imperiled (NatureServe)

Scientific classification
- Kingdom: Plantae
- Clade: Tracheophytes
- Clade: Angiosperms
- Clade: Eudicots
- Clade: Asterids
- Order: Asterales
- Family: Asteraceae
- Genus: Lasthenia
- Species: L. conjugens

Binomial name
- Lasthenia conjugens Greene

= Lasthenia conjugens =

Species of flowering plant

Lasthenia conjugens, commonly known as Contra Costa goldfields, is an endangered species of wildflower endemic to a limited range within the San Francisco Bay Area of the state of California, USA. Specifically this rare species occurs in Napa, Santa Barbara, Solano, Contra Costa, Santa Clara, Monterey and Alameda Counties. This annual herb typically flowers from March through June, and its colonies grow in vernal pool habitats at elevations not exceeding 100 meters above sea level. The Jepson Manual notes that the present distribution is limited to the deltaic Sacramento Valley, principally Napa and Solano Counties, but the historic range of L. conjugens is known to be significantly wider. In any case, historically the range has included parts of the North Coast, Sacramento Valley, and San Francisco Bay Area as well as the South Coast. Alternatively and less frequently this taxon has been referred to as Baeria fremontii var. conjugens.

Even though this plant is found almost exclusively in vernal pools, its behavior in controlled experiments indicates it prefers less than complete inundation. This implies that the plant actually prefers a theoretically drier environment, but is merely less successful than its competitors in surviving in drier (non-inundation) climate regimes.

== Description ==
Lastenia conjugens is an herb whose stems are simple or freely branched and erect, attaining a height of less than 40 centimeters. Their glabrous leaves, of length of approximately eight centimeters, are entire to pinnately lobed. Inflorescences appear in the form of solitary heads, with twelve to eighteen phyllaries fused at one third to less than mid length, a distinguishing hallmark for identification of this species. An involucre structure measures six to ten millimeters and may be somewhat hemispheric. The receptacle presents as dome-shaped or obconic. The yellow ray flowers may number six to thirteen petals, and the five to ten millimeter ligules are yellow as well. The yellow disk flowers are numerous, and anther tips are linear to somewhat ovate. Style tips are triangular. The corollae are typically five-lobed. Style tips may be triangular or round, but typically hair-tufted. The glabrous club-shaped fruits are less than 1.5 millimeters across, black or gray in color, absent a pappus structure. The species is cross-pollinated. According to Greene, the chromosome characteristic is: 2n=12.

== Ecology ==
Lasthenia conjugens relies upon insect pollination for fertilization, and dispersal of seed is largely by gravity. In undisturbed habitats, this and other species of Lasthenia are pollinated by specialist bee species, primarily in the genus Andrena. Studies in Solano County natural and restoration habitats have shown variability between visitation rates to the two types of colonies; however, plant propagation rates were found to be similar between natural colonies and introduced ones, implying pollination is not a limiting factor of propagation. An alternative conclusion is that members of one particular insect family, Sciaridae, are also efficient pollinators of L. conjugens, since it was the only insect family to visit the restoration colonies in significant numbers (the specialist bees are absent from these areas).

== Conservation ==
The population trend for L. conjugens is one of declining numbers as well as shrinking range. According to Jepson, the historic range includes areas not in the present range: parts of the North Coast, more eastern reaches of the Sacramento Valley, more southerly parts of the San Francisco Bay Area and parts of the South Coast. Moreover, the U.S. Fish and Wildlife Service alludes to historic populations in Contra Costa County and Santa Clara County. More specifically another source defines the extended historic San Francisco Bay Area range to have extended from Richmond to Palo Alto By the year 1995 the populations of L. conjugens had declined to the point where there were only five colonies extant, all of which were within Napa and Solano Counties.

Contra Costa goldfields has been studied extensively with regard to genetic diversity of colonies. Some early findings were that repeated seedings in restoration colonies enhanced the resultant population of Lasthenia conjugens and hence ultimate survival. The subsequent finding has been made that genetic diversity has been able to be replicated for introduced colonies in a restoration environment, implying favorable long-term stability and viability for introduced colonies.

In addition to the federal status as an endangered species it gained on June 18, 1997, Lasthenia conjugens is acknowledged and protected under the Solano County Habitat Conservation Plan (HCP). The Solano County Habitat Conservation Plan encourages corridor preservation among vernal pool habitats, which are essential for this species' survival; in addition the HCP states the importance of recognizing genetic differences amongst various colonies of L. conjugens in order to protect the total species genetic diversity. Contra Costa goldfields is not listed by the State of California as endangered.
