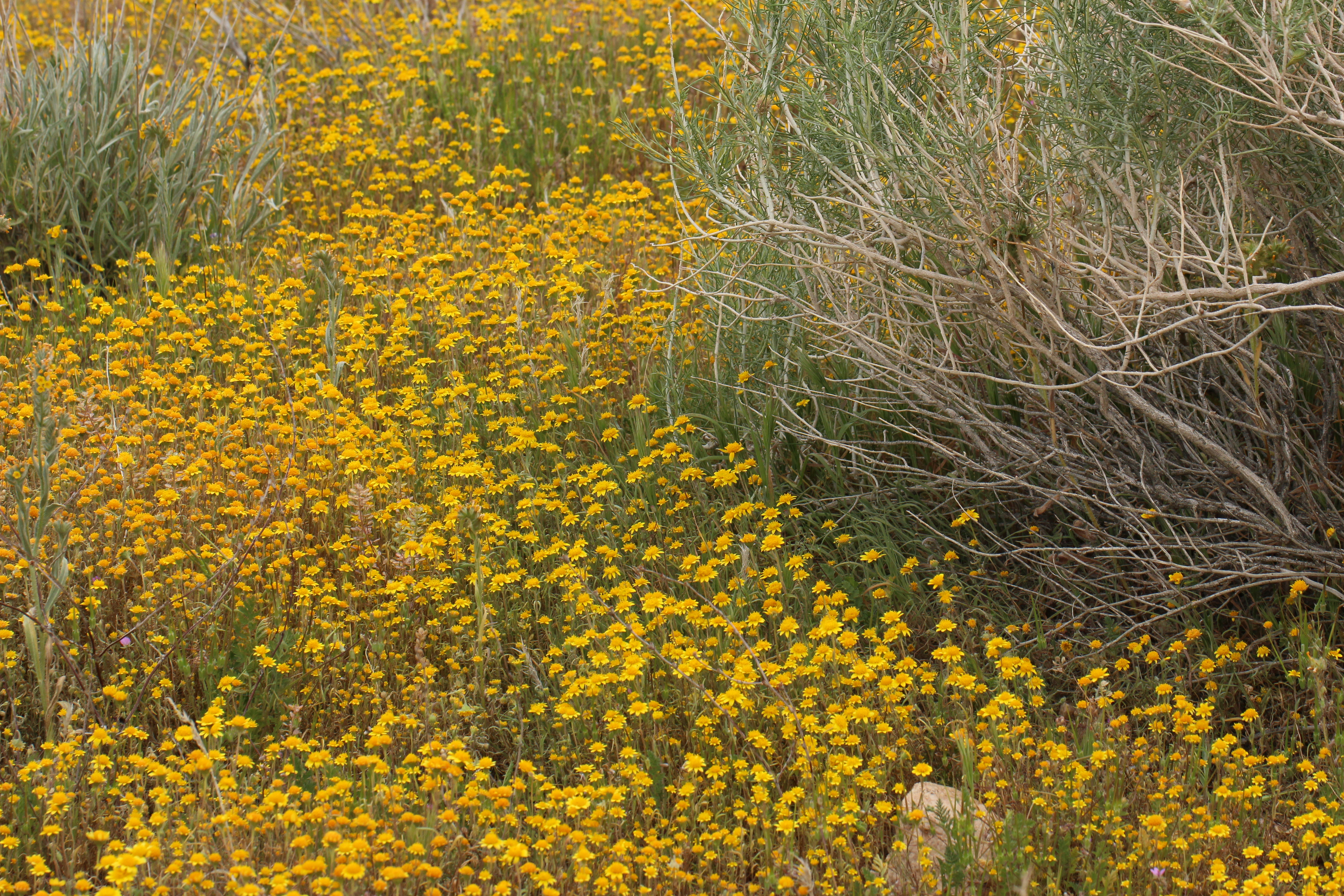

Scientific classification
- Kingdom: Plantae
- Clade: Tracheophytes
- Clade: Angiosperms
- Clade: Eudicots
- Clade: Asterids
- Order: Asterales
- Family: Asteraceae
- Genus: Lasthenia
- Species: L. gracilis

Binomial name
- Lasthenia gracilis (DC.) Greene

= Lasthenia gracilis =

Species of flowering plant

Lasthenia gracilis, the needle goldfields, is an annual plant with yellow flowers that grows in California and Arizona in southwestern United States, and Baja California in northwestern Mexico. It is in the genus Lasthenia of the family Asteraceae.

== Description ==
Lasthenia gracilis is a generally hairy herb, up to 400 millimetres (15.7 in) tall, branched or unbranched. The leaf is 8–70 millimetres (0.3–2.8 in), linear to oblanceolate, without teeth and more or less hairy. The involucre is 5–10 millimetres (0.2–0.4 in). The flower head has 6 to 13 ray flowers 5–10 millimetres (0.2–0.4 in) long. The disk flowers are numerous.
