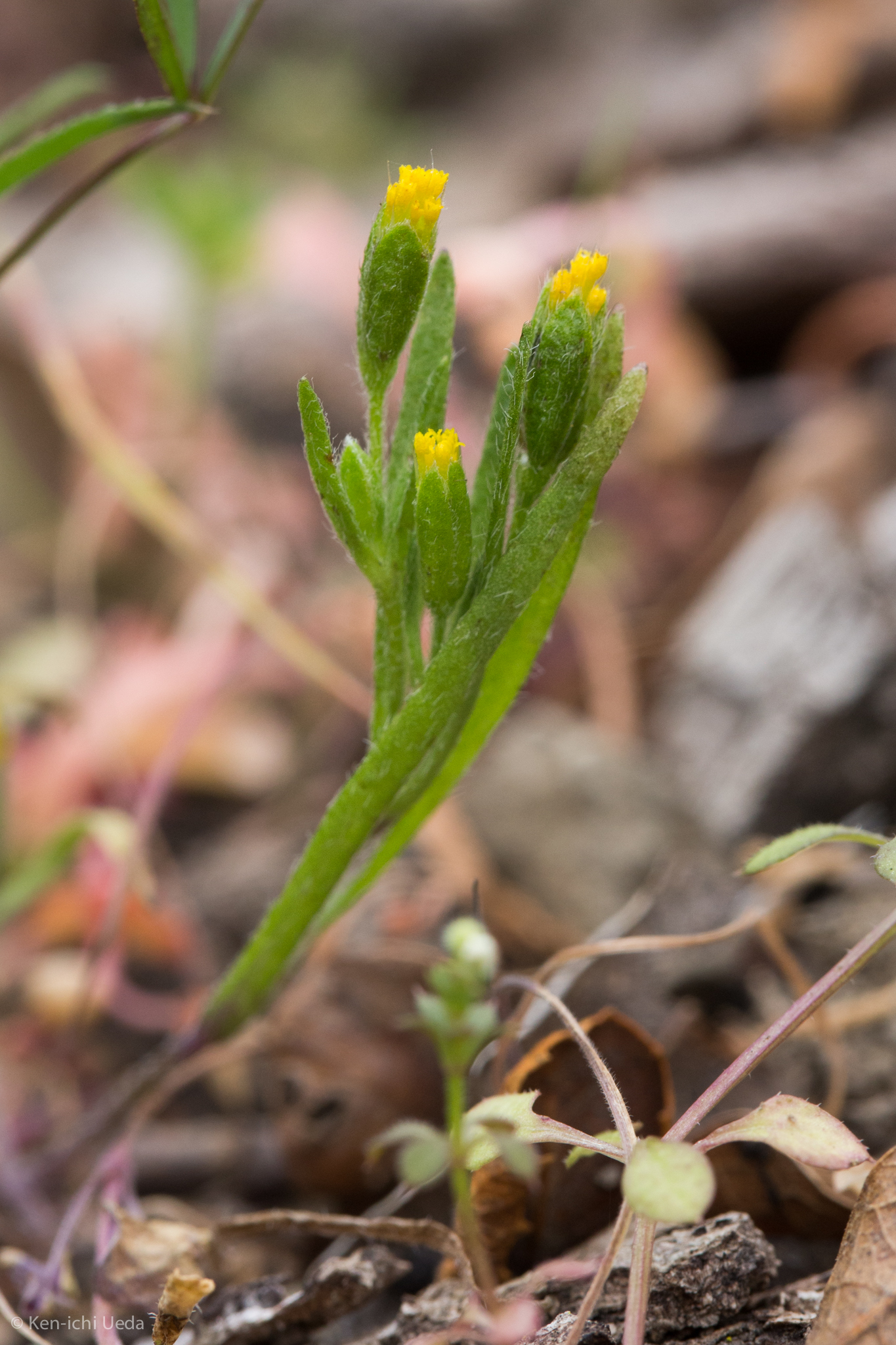

Scientific classification
- Kingdom: Plantae
- Clade: Tracheophytes
- Clade: Angiosperms
- Clade: Eudicots
- Clade: Asterids
- Order: Asterales
- Family: Asteraceae
- Genus: Lasthenia
- Species: L. microglossa

Binomial name
- Lasthenia microglossa (DC.) Greene

Synonyms
- Baeria microglossa Greene; Burrielia microglossa DC.

= Lasthenia microglossa =

Species of flowering plant

Lasthenia microglossa is a species of flowering plant in the family Asteraceae known by the common name smallray goldfields. It is endemic to California, where it grows in shady areas in a number of habitats.

== Description ==
Lasthenia microglossa is a small annual herb growing sprawling stems along the ground or erect to a maximum height near 25 centimeters. The stems are hairy and may be branched or unbranched. The hairy leaves are generally linear in shape and are up to 8 centimeters long, paired oppositely on the stem.

The flower is less than a centimeter across and is mostly made up of golden yellow disc florets. If there are ray florets they are less than a millimeter long.

The fruit is a hairy achene a few millimeters long, sometimes with a pappus of tiny scales.
