= Sacramento Waldorf School =

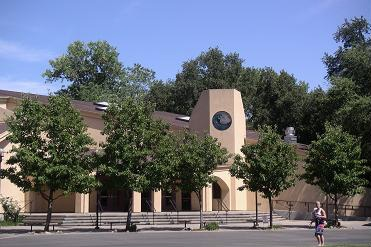
- Sacramento Waldorf School

Location
- Fair Oaks, California; United States
- 38°37′56″N 121°17′11″W

Information
- School type: Private (U.S.)
- Religious affiliation: Nondenominational/Nonsectarian
- Founded: 1959
- Grades: Pre-K to 12
- Enrollment: 473
- Campus type: Rural/Suburban
- Colors: Blue & Gold
- Mascot: Waves

Established in 1959, the Sacramento Waldorf School is an American private school offering programs from pre-kindergarten through twelfth grade. It is fully accredited by the Western Association of Schools and Colleges and the Association of Waldorf Schools of North America.

Sacramento Waldorf School is the largest Waldorf school in North America. The campus, which includes a stream and small working farm, is located on 22 acres (89,000 m^{2}) in Fair Oaks, California, overlooking the American River.

== History ==
The founding school started in 1959 with just a few kindergarten classrooms in a Carmichael home. With enrollment growing, the school moved to a rented church hall, and on to its present site in Fair Oaks a few years later. By the mid-1980s the campus had grown to accommodate approximately 350 students in grades kindergarten through 12, and included a working farm, library and several rustic buildings, including a former bunkhouse, now the Meristem building, which was lifted from its original foundations in Citrus Heights and moved to the Fair Oaks campus.

In 1985 the school completed construction on a geodesic dome building to house administrative offices and new, larger library. Just two days before the start of the new school year, the dome and most of the school's recently installed library collection were destroyed in an arson fire. With classes scheduled to resume in just a few days, the school received an outpouring of support from the neighboring community and other schools, including offers from the local San Juan Unified School District to help the school resupply books lost in the fire. Within eight months of the loss, then estimated to value $350,000, construction was underway on a new $1.4 million administration building and library.

In 1997 the school finished construction on Linden Hall, providing its first gymnasium, music and performing arts center, and movement room as well as several additional classrooms. The school also added new classes for preschool aged children. In 2006 the enrollment was 440, and new construction began on special purpose designed buildings with modern science and computer laboratories for the teaching of high school biology, chemistry, physics, computers and mathematics.

== Curriculum ==
The curriculum for the school follows a fairly typical Waldorf education academic program and also includes music, handwork, drama, and visual arts from kindergarten up through high school.

== Extra curricular activities ==
The high school plays various sports as part of the CIF Division VI Central Valley California League. These include boys and girls soccer and basketball, boys volleyball, and girls volleyball. Other sports offered have included a ski team, cross country, track and field, and mountain biking, all co-ed. The school's other extra curricular activities include student-led clubs, drama productions, and a speech and debate team.
