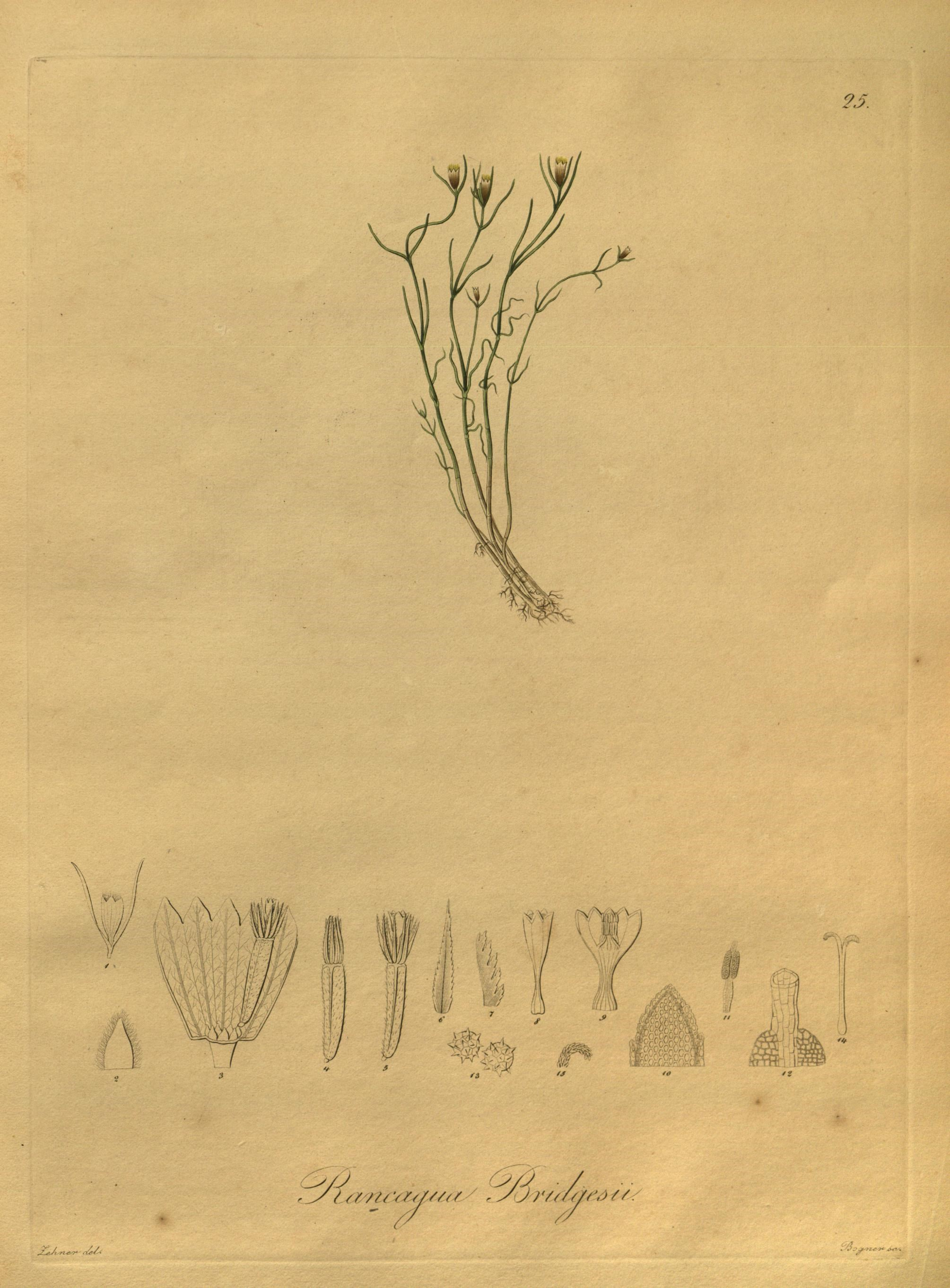

Scientific classification
- Kingdom: Plantae
- Clade: Tracheophytes
- Clade: Angiosperms
- Clade: Eudicots
- Clade: Asterids
- Order: Asterales
- Family: Asteraceae
- Genus: Lasthenia
- Species: L. kunthii

Binomial name
- Lasthenia kunthii Hook. & Arn.

= Lasthenia kunthii =

Species of plant

Lasthenia kunthii (vernacular name ranca)) is a herb endemic to central Chile. It was first gathered in Rancagua.

This herb grows in inundated environments, such as lagoons and grasslands with large amounts of salt. Its range is mostly between Coquimbo and Valdivia, but it has also been observed in Ultima Esperanza (Magallanes Region) and in the provinces of Chubut and Río Negro, Argentina.

== Classification ==
Lasthenia kunthii Hook.et Arn. (syn. L. obtusifolia Cass.,)
