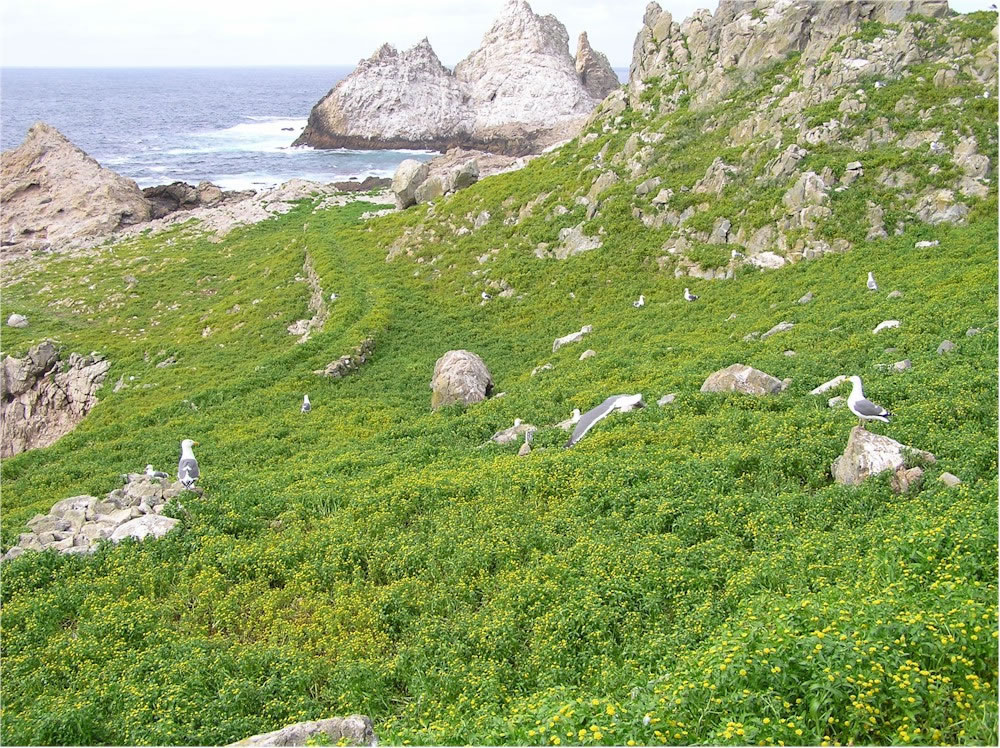
- Farallon Islands, California: a hillside covered in L. maritima

Conservation status
- Apparently Secure (NatureServe)

Scientific classification
- Kingdom: Plantae
- Clade: Tracheophytes
- Clade: Angiosperms
- Clade: Eudicots
- Clade: Asterids
- Order: Asterales
- Family: Asteraceae
- Genus: Lasthenia
- Species: L. maritima

Binomial name
- Lasthenia maritima (A.Gray) M.C.Vasey

Synonyms
- Baeria maritima (A.Gray) A.Gray; Burrielia maritima A.Gray

= Lasthenia maritima =

Plant species in the daisy family

Lasthenia maritima is a species of flowering plant in the family Asteraceae known by the common names maritime goldfields and seaside goldfields.

== Distribution ==
It is native to the coastline of western North America, where it is found almost exclusively on small rocky, coastal islands in the Pacific Ocean between Vancouver Island in British Columbia to the Farallon Islands off the coast of the San Francisco Bay Area in California.

This species probably evolved from Lasthenia minor, and it is adapted to the unique conditions on these maritime islands: high winds, saline sea spray, and thin soils that are often disturbed by the activities of the seabirds that roost and nest on these rocks and made acidic and nitrogen-rich from their droppings.

Though limited in distribution, this is one of the more common plants on the Farallon Islands of California, where it is an important part of the ecology of seabirds and where it is locally known as Farallon weed.

== Description ==
Lasthenia maritima is an annual herb with short, decumbent to prostrate stems lined with fleshy lobed or unlobed leaves up to 9 centimeters long.

The inflorescence bears flower heads lined with hairy phyllaries and ringed with 7 to 12 gold ray florets each about 3 millimeters long.

The fruit is a small, hairy achene often topped with a brownish pappus.

== Taxonomy ==
In 1868 the botanist Asa Gray described a new species in the Burrielia genus, which he named Burrielia maritima. It was then reclassified five times, including as a variety of Lasthenia minor by Robert Ornduff in 1966. The accepted name was published in 1985 by Michael C. Vasey, who moved it to Lasthenia. Together with its genus it is part of the Asteraceae. All of its five synonyms are homotypic.

Table of Synonyms
Name	Year	Rank
Baeria maritima (A.Gray) A.Gray	1874	species
Baeria minor subsp. maritima (A.Gray) J.T.Howell	1955	subspecies
Burrielia maritima A.Gray	1868	species
Lasthenia minor subsp. maritima (A.Gray) Ornduff	1966	subspecies
Lasthenia minor var. maritima (A.Gray) Cronquist	1973	variety
