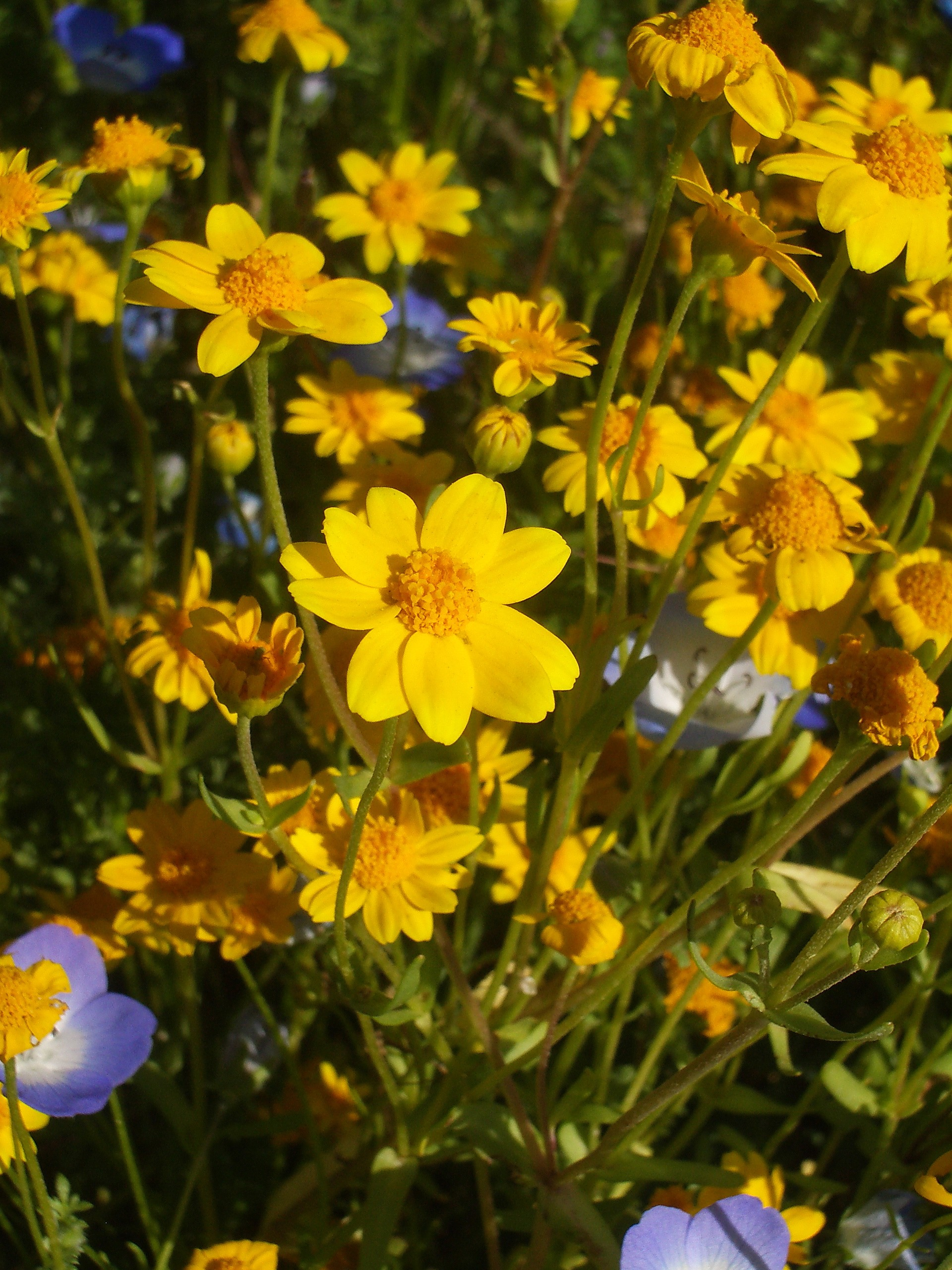
- Lasthenia glabrata

Scientific classification
- Kingdom: Plantae
- Clade: Tracheophytes
- Clade: Angiosperms
- Clade: Eudicots
- Clade: Asterids
- Order: Asterales
- Family: Asteraceae
- Subfamily: Asteroideae
- Tribe: Madieae
- Subtribe: Baeriinae
- Genus: Lasthenia; Cass.

Type species
- Lasthenia californica DC. ex Lindl.

Species
- See text

= Lasthenia =

Goldfields

Genus of flowering plants

Lasthenia, commonly known as goldfields, is a genus of flowering plants in the family Asteraceae. The genus is named after Lasthenia of Mantinea, a cross-dressing female pupil of the ancient Greek philosopher Plato.

== Description ==
The goldfield genus comprises annual (rarely perennial) herbs that are either glabrous or hairy. Stems are typically branched and erect, attaining a height of less than 60 cm (24 in). Their opposite leaves, up to 20 cm (8 in) in length, have entire margins and pinnate venation.

Inflorescences are characterized by solitary heads (sometimes in cymes), with phyllaries free or partly fused. The receptacle may present as naked and narrowly conic to hemispherical. The normally yellow ray florets may number 4 to 16, and the ligules are typically yellow as well. The numerous disk florets typically have yellow, 5-lobed corollae. Anther tips manifest as acuminate to triangular. Style tips may be triangular or round and are typically hair-tufted.

Fruits are less than 5 mm (0.2 in) across, cylindric to obovoid in shape, and black or gray in color. The pappus may present awns or scales, or infrequently neither. The genus is mostly cross-pollinated, with some insects serving as pollinators.

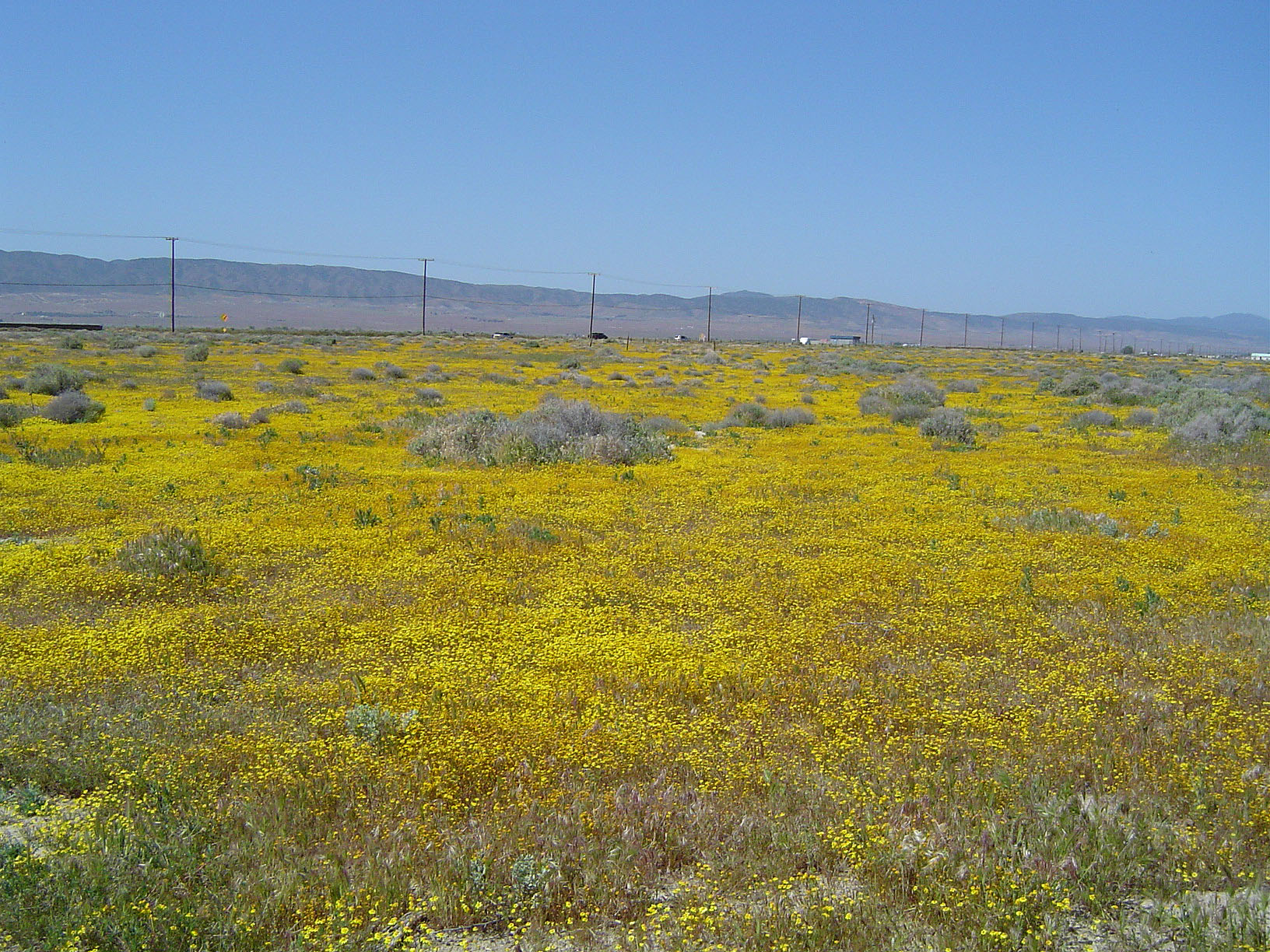
California Goldfields (Lasthenia californica), Antelope Valley

== Ecology and horticulture ==
Goldfield species occur over a range of habitat, such as meadows, shrubland and open forest, but tend towards semiarid conditions. They are commonly found at ephemeral pools and are important plants in coastal regions. They are visited by Sciaridae fungus gnats for nectar, and it is possible that these animals are key pollinators at least for Contra Costa Goldfields (L. conjugens).

In horticulture, most make hardy ornamental plants, suitable for flower-beds or borders. Autumn is the best time for sowing the seed, but it may also be sown early in the spring.

== Species ==
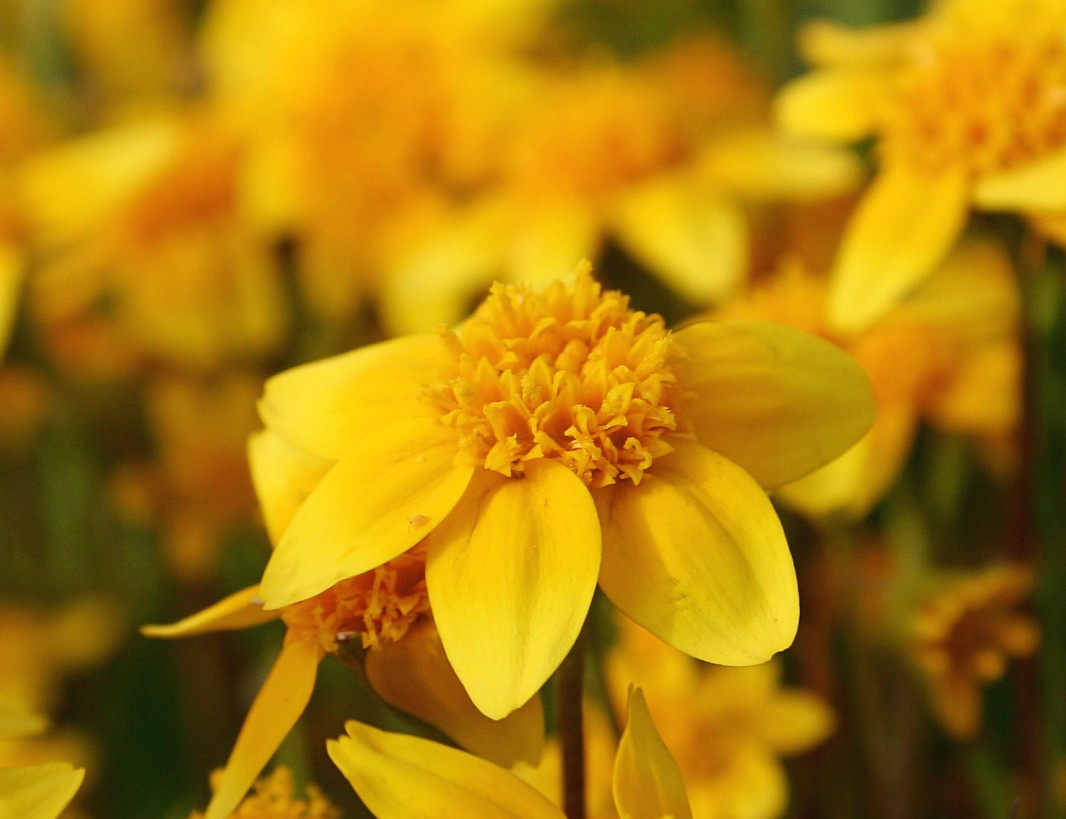
L. californica

There are a total of eighteen species, seventeen are endemic to North America and one species is only found in Chile. Of the seventeen species found in North America, most are endemic to California.

- Lasthenia burkei – Burke's goldfields (endemic to California, endangered)
- Lasthenia californica

Lasthenia californica subsp. californica – California goldfields (found in northern California and Oregon)
Lasthenia californica subsp. bakeri – Baker's goldfields (endemic to California)
Lasthenia californica subsp. macrantha – perennial goldfields (endemic to California)

- Lasthenia chrysantha – alkali sink goldfields (endemic to California)
- Lasthenia conjugens – Contra Costa goldfields (endemic to California, endangered)
- Lasthenia coronaria – crowned goldfields, royal goldfields (found in California and northern Mexico)
- Lasthenia debilis – Greene's goldfields (endemic to California)
- Lasthenia ferrisiae – Ferris's goldfields (endemic to California)
- Lasthenia fremontii – Fremont's goldfields (endemic to California)
- Lasthenia glaberrima – smooth goldfields (found in California, Oregon, Washington, and British Columbia)
- Lasthenia glabrata

Lasthenia glabrata subsp. glabrata – yellow-ray goldfields (endemic to California)
Lasthenia glabrata subsp. coulteri – Coulter's goldfields (endemic to California)

- Lasthenia gracilis – common goldfields (found in California, Arizona, the Channel Islands of California, and northern Mexico)
- Lasthenia kunthii – Chilean goldfields (found in vernal pools in Chile)
- Lasthenia leptalea – Salinas Valley goldfields (endemic to California)
- Lasthenia maritima – maritime goldfields, seaside goldfields (found along the coast and offshore islands and islets from California to British Columbia)
- Lasthenia microglossa – small-ray goldfields (endemic to California)
- Lasthenia minor – coastal goldfields (endemic to coastal and inland California)
- Lasthenia ornduffii – Ornduff's goldfields (endemic to Oregon)
- Lasthenia platycarpha – alkali goldfields (endemic to California)
