= Lasthenia platycarpha =

Scientific classification
- Kingdom: Plantae
- Clade: Tracheophytes
- Clade: Angiosperms
- Clade: Eudicots
- Clade: Asterids
- Order: Asterales
- Family: Asteraceae
- Genus: Lasthenia
- Species: L. platycarpha

Binomial name
- Lasthenia platycarpha (A.Gray) Greene

Species of flowering plant

Lasthenia platycarpha is a species of flowering plant in the family Asteraceae known by the common name alkali goldfields. It is endemic to California, where it is known mainly from the Central Valley.

It grows in alkali flats and other areas with alkaline soils.

== Description ==
Lasthenia platycarpha is an annual herb producing an erect stem approaching 30 centimeters in maximum height. The oppositely arranged leaves are up to 6 centimeters long, sometimes lobed, and sometimes coated in hairs.

The inflorescence bears small flower heads with centers of gold disc florets and 6 to 13 golden yellow ray florets each just under a centimeter long.

The fruit is a hairy achene with a pappus at the top.
