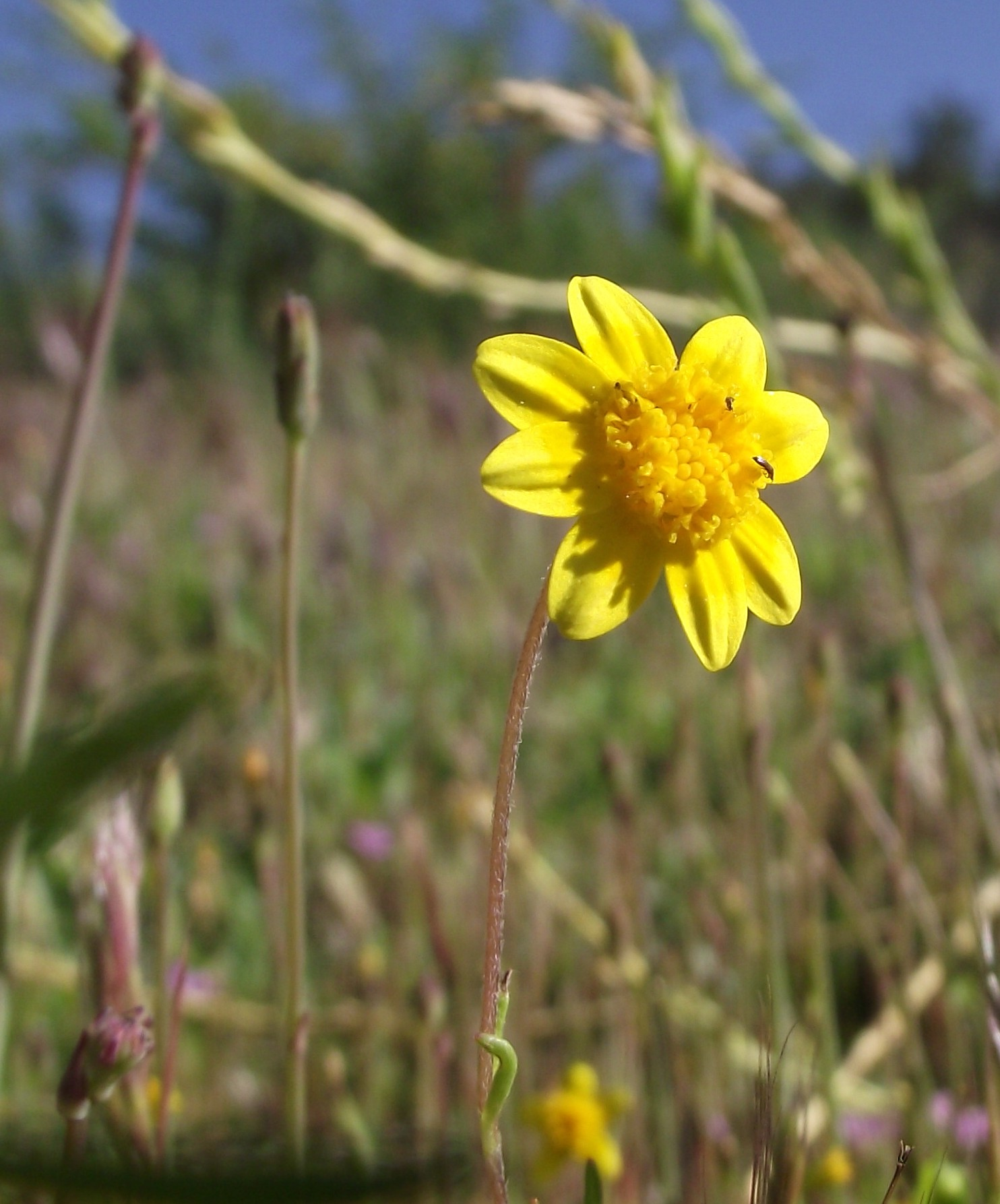

Scientific classification
- Kingdom: Plantae
- Clade: Tracheophytes
- Clade: Angiosperms
- Clade: Eudicots
- Clade: Asterids
- Order: Asterales
- Family: Asteraceae
- Genus: Lasthenia
- Species: L. coronaria

Binomial name
- Lasthenia coronaria (Nutt.) Ornduff

Synonyms
- Baeria californica

= Lasthenia coronaria =

Species of flowering plant

Lasthenia coronaria is a species of flowering plant in the family Asteraceae known by the common name royal goldfields. It is native to California and Baja California, including Guadalupe Island.

== Description ==
Lasthenia coronaria is an annual herb approaching a maximum height near 40 centimeters. The stem may be branched or not and it bears linear or deeply divided, pointed leaves up to about 6 centimeters long. The leaves, and sometimes the stems, have a coat of glandular hairs. The foliage has a sweet scent.

Atop the stems are inflorescences of flower heads with hairy, glandular phyllaries. The head contains many yellow disc florets with a fringe of small yellow ray florets.

The fruit is a hairy achene up to about 2 millimeters long.
