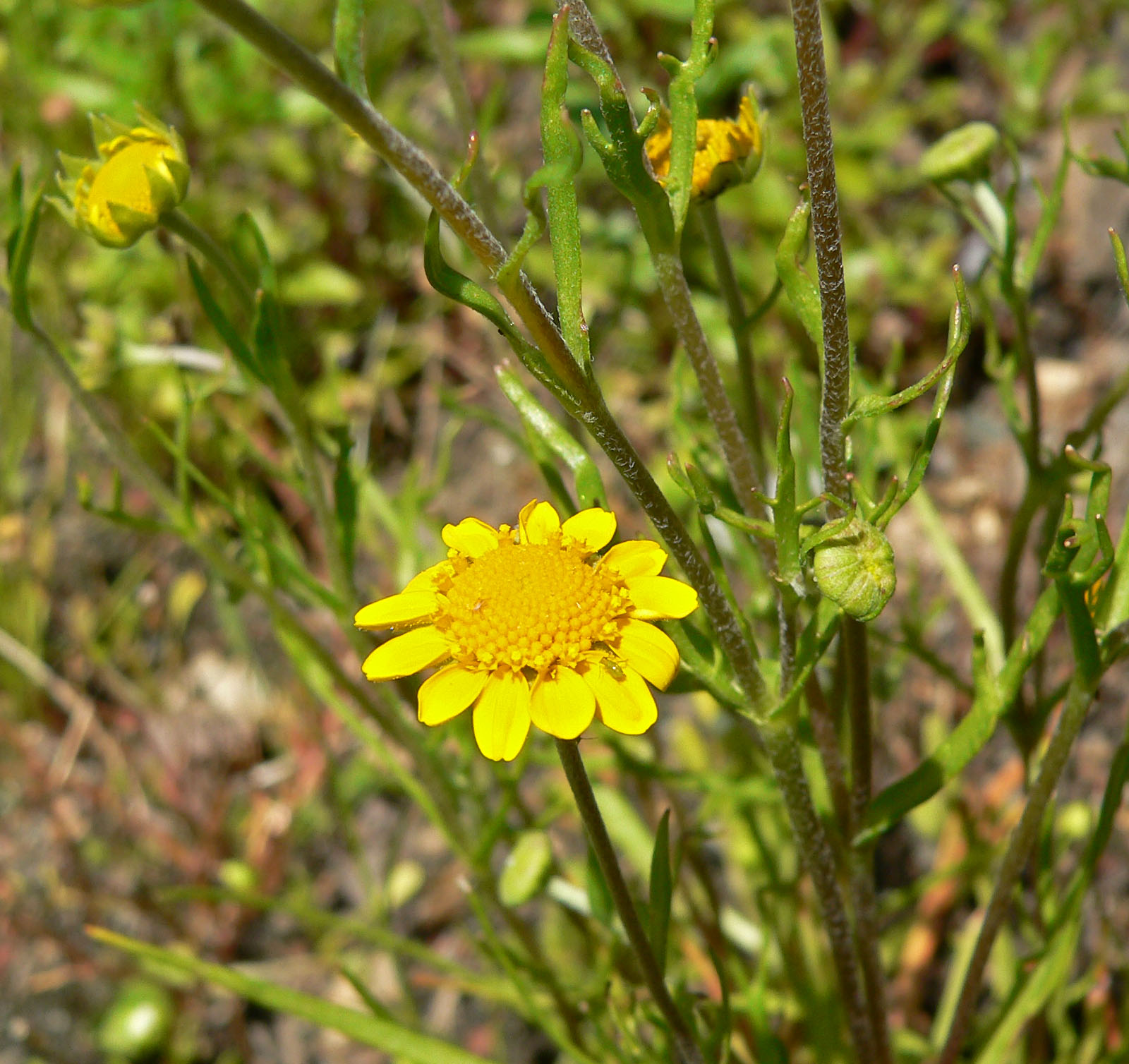

Conservation status
- Critically Imperiled (NatureServe)

Scientific classification
- Kingdom: Plantae
- Clade: Tracheophytes
- Clade: Angiosperms
- Clade: Eudicots
- Clade: Asterids
- Order: Asterales
- Family: Asteraceae
- Genus: Lasthenia
- Species: L. burkei

Binomial name
- Lasthenia burkei Greene

= Lasthenia burkei =

Species of flowering plant

Lasthenia burkei is a rare species of flowering plant in the family Asteraceae known by the common names Burke's goldfields and Burke's baeria.

== Distribution ==
The plant is endemic to California, where it is known from three counties north of the San Francisco Bay Area. It grows in moist spring meadows and vernal pools.

=== Critically endangered plant ===
This is a listed endangered species on the federal level in the United States and the state level in California. It is listed as Critically Imperiled—Critically endangered by NatureServe.

There are probably fewer than ten occurrences in Lake, Mendocino, and Sonoma Counties. It is threatened by the destruction and degradation of its rare wetland habitat, and it may be extinct by 2025.

== Description ==
Lasthenia burkei is an erect annual herb producing hairy stems with sparse linear or deeply divided, narrow, pointed leaves a few centimeters long.

Atop the stem is an inflorescence, which is a flower head with a base of hairy phyllaries. The head contains many yellow disc florets surrounded by a fringe of several short ray florets, which are usually also yellow.

The fruit is a hairy, club-shaped achene less than 2 millimeters long.
