= Fair Oaks, California =

- Unincorporated community Census designated place
- Interactive map of Fair Oaks, California
- Location in California Location in the United States
- Coordinates: 38°39′5″N 121°15′33″W
- Country: United States
- State: California
- County: Sacramento

Area
  - Total: 11.24 sq mi (29.1 km^{2})
  - Land: 10.88 sq mi (28.2 km^{2})
  - Water: 0.36 sq mi (0.93 km^{2}) 3.20%
- Elevation: 174 ft (53 m)

Population (April 1, 2020)
  - Total: 32,514
  - Density: 2,989.5/sq mi (1,154.3/km^{2})
- Time zone: UTC−8 (Pacific)
  - Summer (DST): UTC−7 (PDT)
- ZIP code: 95628
- Area code: 916, 279
- FIPS code: 06-23294
- GNIS feature IDs: 277510, 2408100

Fair Oaks is an unincorporated community in Sacramento County, California, United States. It is part of the Sacramento metropolitan area. For statistical purposes, the United States Census Bureau has defined Fair Oaks as a census-designated place (CDP). The population was 32,514 at the 2020 census, up from 30,912 at the 2010 census. The Fair Oaks zip code is 95628 and its area codes are 916 and 279. It is bordered to the west by Carmichael, north by the city of Citrus Heights, to the east by Orangevale, and to the south by the American River.

== Geography and climate ==
=== Geography ===
Fair Oaks is a natural, lush foliage town with rolling streets, canopies of trees, located at 38°39′5″N 121°15′33″W (38.651254, -121.259279), between Sacramento and Folsom.

Fair Oaks is bounded on the south side by the American River, and Gold River, on the north side by the city of Citrus Heights, on the west side by Carmichael, and the east side by Orangevale and Folsom. Fair Oaks has a mix of upscale, custom home pocket areas, few apartments, and is a semi-rural neighborhood with easy access to Highway 50.

According to the United States Census Bureau, the CDP has a total area of 11.2 square miles (29 km^{2}), of which 10.9 square miles (28 km^{2}) is land and 0.4 square miles (1.0 km^{2}) (3.20%) is water.

=== Climate ===
Fair Oaks has a hot-summer Mediterranean climate (Köppen Csa), characterized by damp to wet, mild winters and hot, dry summers.

==== Temperature ====
The normal annual mean temperature is 61.0 °F (16.1 °C), with the monthly daily average temperature ranging from 46.4 °F (8.0 °C) in December to 75.5 °F (24.2 °C) in July. Summer heat is often moderated by a sea breeze known as the "delta breeze" which comes through the Sacramento–San Joaquin River Delta from the San Francisco Bay, and temperatures cool down sharply at night. On average, there are 73 days where the high exceeds 90 °F (32 °C), and 14 days where the high exceeds 100 °F (38 °C); On the other extreme, there are 15 days where the temperature does not exceed 50 °F (10 °C), and 15 freezing nights per year. The foggiest months are December and January. Tule fog can be extremely dense, lowering visibility to less than 100 feet (30 m) and making driving conditions extremely hazardous. Chilling tule fog events have been known to last for several consecutive days or weeks. During Tule fog events, temperatures do not exceed 50 degrees.

==== Precipitation ====
The average annual precipitation is 18.52 inches (470 mm). The wet season is generally October through April, though there may be a day or two of light rainfall in June or September. On average, precipitation falls on 60 days each year in Fair Oaks, and nearly all of this falls during the winter months. Average January rainfall is 3.67 in (93 mm), and measurable precipitation is rare during the summer months. On rare occasions, monsoonal moisture surges from the Desert Southwest can bring upper-level moisture to the Sacramento region, leading to increased summer cloudiness, humidity, and even light showers and thunderstorms. Monsoon clouds do occur, usually during late July through early September. This climate is suited to the endangered Sacramento Orcutt Grass, which has a protected reserve at the Phoenix Vernal Pools.

Snowfall is rare in Fair Oaks, which is only 174 ft (53 m) above sea level. During especially cold winter and spring storms, intense showers can produce a significant amount of hail, which can create hazardous driving conditions. Snowfall usually melts upon ground contact, with traceable amounts of snow occurring in some years.

== Town center ==
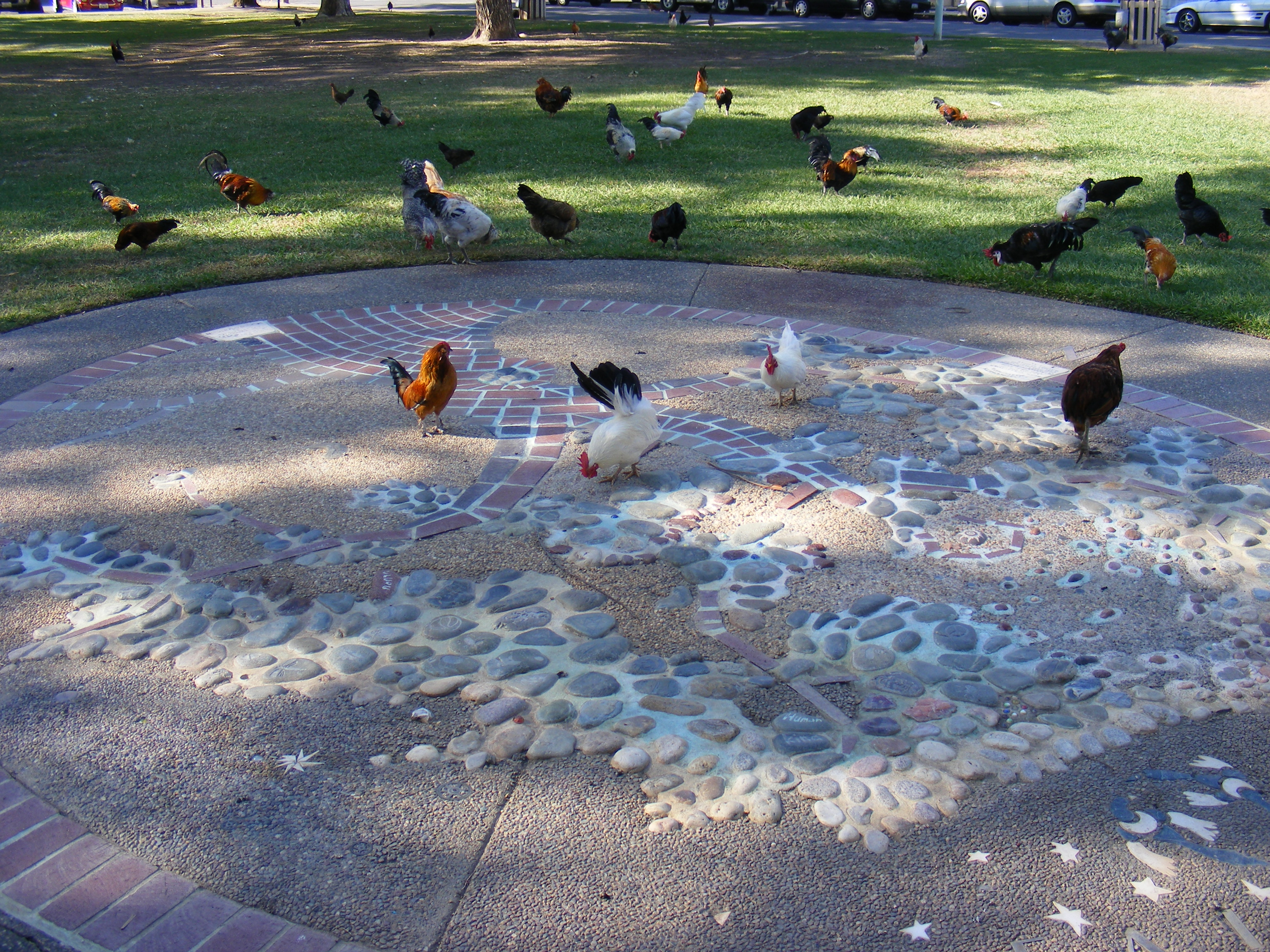
Chickens running free in Fair Oaks village.

The town center of Fair Oaks is called Old Fair Oaks Village, which is located approximately a half-mile away from the American River Parkway. The Veterans Memorial Amphitheatre is located in this part of town. Events that take place here include the Fair Oaks Theater Festival, the Fair Oaks Fiesta and Car Show, and the annual Fair Oaks Chicken Festival each September. The town also has a population of about 200 chickens.

The town center also houses the Fair Oaks History Center, which contains the history of the founding and development of Fair Oaks including displays featuring pictures and artifacts dating from the early 1900s, as well as a small collection of early Maidu Indian artifacts.

Fair Oaks Recreation & Parks District received a $27 million bond towards the revitalization of the Community Club House, Theatre, and Village Park. Construction is underway and all Village events have been postponed until Summer 2022.

== Demographics ==
Historical population
Census	Pop.	Note	%±
1980	23,294		—
1990	26,867		15.3%
2000	28,008		4.2%
2010	30,912		10.4%
2020	32,514		5.2%
U.S. Decennial Census; 1850–1870 1880-1890; 1900 1910 1920; 1930 1940 1950; 1960 1970 1980; 1990 2000 2010

=== 2020 census ===
As of the 2020 census, Fair Oaks had a population of 32,514 and a population density of 2,989.5 inhabitants per square mile (1,154.3/km^{2}).

The age distribution was 17.7% under the age of 18, 6.7% aged 18 to 24, 22.8% aged 25 to 44, 27.7% aged 45 to 64, and 25.1% who were 65 years of age or older. The median age was 47.6 years. For every 100 females there were 93.4 males, and for every 100 females age 18 and over there were 91.4 males age 18 and over.

The census reported that 98.8% of the population lived in households, 0.6% lived in non-institutionalized group quarters, and 0.5% were institutionalized.

There were 13,434 households in Fair Oaks, of which 24.7% had children under the age of 18 living in them. Of all households, 51.5% were married-couple households, 6.4% were cohabiting couple households, 15.6% were households with a male householder and no spouse or partner present, and 26.5% were households with a female householder and no spouse or partner present. About 26.7% of all households were made up of individuals and 13.6% had someone living alone who was 65 years of age or older. The average household size was 2.39. There were 8,974 families (66.8% of all households).

There were 13,958 housing units at an average density of 1,283.4 per square mile (495.5/km^{2}), of which 3.8% were vacant. The homeowner vacancy rate was 1.1% and the rental vacancy rate was 3.5%. Of the 13,434 occupied units, 67.2% were owner-occupied and 32.8% were occupied by renters.

99.9% of residents lived in urban areas, while 0.1% lived in rural areas.

Racial composition as of the 2020 census
Race	Number	Percent
White	24,704	76.0%
Black or African American	779	2.4%
American Indian and Alaska Native	212	0.7%
Asian	1,735	5.3%
Native Hawaiian and Other Pacific Islander	53	0.2%
Some other race	1,221	3.8%
Two or more races	3,810	11.7%
Hispanic or Latino (of any race)	4,128	12.7%

=== 2023 American Community Survey ===
In 2023, the US Census Bureau estimated that 10.1% of the population were foreign-born. Of all people aged 5 or older, 86.1% spoke only English at home, 5.2% spoke Spanish, 6.6% spoke other Indo-European languages, 1.5% spoke Asian or Pacific Islander languages, and 0.6% spoke other languages. Of those aged 25 or older, 96.4% were high school graduates and 46.4% had a bachelor's degree.

The median household income was $111,332, and the per capita income was $58,911. About 4.8% of families and 8.3% of the population were below the poverty line.

=== 2010 census ===
The 2010 United States census reported that Fair Oaks had a population of 30,912. The population density was 2,748.8 inhabitants per square mile (1,061.3/km^{2}). The racial makeup of Fair Oaks was 26,479 (85.7%) White, 729 (2.4%) African American, 255 (0.8%) Native American, 1,289 (4.2%) Asian, 57 (0.2%) Pacific Islander, 738 (2.4%) from other races, and 1,365 (4.4%) from two or more races. Hispanic or Latino of any race were 2,954 persons (9.6%).

The Census reported that 30,482 people (98.6% of the population) lived in households, 261 (0.8%) lived in non-institutionalized group quarters, and 169 (0.5%) were institutionalized.

There were 12,838 households, out of which 3,469 (27.0%) had children under the age of 18 living in them, 6,655 (51.8%) were opposite-sex married couples living together, 1,298 (10.1%) had a female householder with no husband present, 611 (4.8%) had a male householder with no wife present. There were 761 (5.9%) unmarried opposite-sex partnerships, and 109 (0.8%) same-sex married couples or partnerships. 3,304 households (25.7%) were made up of individuals, and 1,304 (10.2%) had someone living alone who was 65 years of age or older. The average household size was 2.37. There were 8,564 families (66.7% of all households); the average family size was 2.84.

The population was spread out, with 6,050 people (19.6%) under the age of 18, 2,380 people (7.7%) aged 18 to 24, 6,677 people (21.6%) aged 25 to 44, 10,078 people (32.6%) aged 45 to 64, and 5,727 people (18.5%) who were 65 years of age or older. The median age was 45.8 years. For every 100 females, there were 95.3 males. For every 100 females age 18 and over, there were 92.2 males.

There were 13,558 housing units at an average density of 1,205.6 per square mile (465.5/km^{2}), of which 8,605 (67.0%) were owner-occupied, and 4,233 (33.0%) were occupied by renters. The homeowner vacancy rate was 1.4%; the rental vacancy rate was 6.7%. 21,038 people (68.1% of the population) lived in owner-occupied housing units and 9,444 people (30.6%) lived in rental housing units.

== History ==
=== 19th century ===
The community began as part of the 1844 Rancho San Juan Mexican land grant. In 1895, Brevet Brigadier General Charles Henry Howard and James W. Wilson of the Howard-Wilson Publishing Company of Chicago acquired rights to present Fair Oaks community, then primarily covered by citrus farms, from California Senator Frederick K. Cox and businessman Crawford W. Clarke. The Howard-Wilson company surveyed and mapped the land and began to promote Fair Oaks as one of their “Sunset Colonies.” The Howard-Wilson company advertised Fair Oaks as an innovative and growing citrus colony after destructive freezes in Southern California and Florida and a national depression hitting in 1893. Many of the purchasers were professionals and other friends of the investors and the Fair Oaks community was initially composed primarily of businessmen and other professionals, including bankers and engineers.

In 1897, 300 permanent settlers lived in Fair Oaks, and purchased land in 5 to 20-acre tracts. Few farmers came to Fair Oaks, causing investment to diminish. This led to the Howard-Wilson Company withdrawing from the area. A club of businessmen in Chicago and Sacramento who had an investment (land or fruit) in the newborn colony and Orangevale formed the Chicago-Fair Oaks Club in 1899. They lobbied the government and other investors. They also helped in the construction of a bridge in Fair Oaks in 1901. Then a group of local businessmen, including Valentine S. McClatchy (the co-owner of the Sacramento Bee), incorporated the Fair Oaks Development Company in 1900. The boosters proclaimed Fair Oaks to be the “crown of the [Sacramento] valley,” in the “heart of California.”

Together these groups were able to succeed in constructing an efficient water supply. They convinced the Sacramento Chamber of Commerce, which McClatchy's business partners from Orangevale created and chaired, to build a bridge across the American River at Fair Oaks in 1901. At the same time, the community leaders were also able to persuade the Southern Pacific Rail Road Company to build a railroad line to the bridge. Today, the bridge is known to locals as "The Red Bridge." There is now a trail on the Northeast side of the bridge that people climb to sit on the cliffs high above the river and watch the sunset

=== 20th century and growth ===
Fair Oaks grew rapidly with the completion of the Fair Oaks Bridge and the railroad line. The Fair Oaks Fruit Company incorporated in 1902 and built a warehouse in Fair Oaks to export not only citrus, but also almonds and olives. Also, in 1902, Dr. R. N. Bramhall became the first medical doctor to reside and set up office in Fair Oaks. The agricultural productivity attracted the development of other community services. Fair Oaks had become a typical small town by 1906 with a post office, hotel, blacksmith shop, lumber yard, pharmacy, bank, cemetery, newspaper, and a number of small dry-goods and grocery stores located along Main Street.

Two churches (Methodist and Presbyterian) were built and two schools (The Four Gables School and the Fair Oaks School—the current Community Clubhouse) appeared by 1910. The Fair Oaks Library Association formed in 1908 and constructed a permanent building in 1912. The Fair Oaks Civic Club purchased and developed the Plaza in 1918 for recreational and leisure activities. This plaza is still in use today.

=== Loss of the citrus crops ===
A big freeze hit in 1932 at the height of the Great Depression and many or most citrus groves were lost. After this and a similar freeze in 1934, Fair Oaks was no longer a major producer of citrus fruit in California. For the decades following and until the end of WWII, the Fair Oaks economy struggled to recover. In 1955, Aerojet, a rocket engine producing company, helped the Fair Oaks economy recover by bringing one of its new facilities nearby in what is now present-day Rancho Cordova. Some temporary dislocations occurred when employment at Aerojet dropped over 90% in the late 1960s and early 1970s. The growth rate still continued, however, because of the increased access to Sacramento by Highway 50 and the construction of the Sunrise Boulevard Bridge in 1954. This allowed both for residents of Fair Oaks to find greater employment in the connecting area and for Sacramentans to relocate to Fair Oaks more easily. The former citrus colony transformed into a bedroom community of greater Sacramento.

== Government ==
Republican Roger Niello represents the community in the State Senate, while Republican Josh Hoover represents the community in the State Assembly.

In the United States House of Representatives, Fair Oaks is in California's 6th congressional district, represented by Democrat Ami Bera. Fair Oaks is an unincorporated community represented by No Party Preference Rich Desmond on the Sacramento County Board of Supervisors. A Local Planning Council, made up of seven community members, is appointed by the Board of Supervisors to recommend land-use decisions for Fair Oaks. These recommendations are then sent to the Planning Commission of Sacramento County. The Sacramento County Sheriff provides law enforcement for Fair Oaks.

=== Education ===
Public schools in Fair Oaks are part of the San Juan Unified School District and include Earl LeGette Elementary School, Northridge Elementary School, Orangevale Open K-8 School, Will Rogers Middle School, Bella Vista High School and Del Campo High School. Major private schools in Fair Oaks include Summit Christian School, Sacramento Waldorf School, and St. Mel Catholic School.

== Transportation ==
=== Public transportation ===
Fair Oaks is served by the Sacramento Regional Transit District. Hazel station near Hazel Avenue is the closest SacRT light rail stop.

Many bike trails are in the area, the largest of which is the American River Parkway Bike Trail.

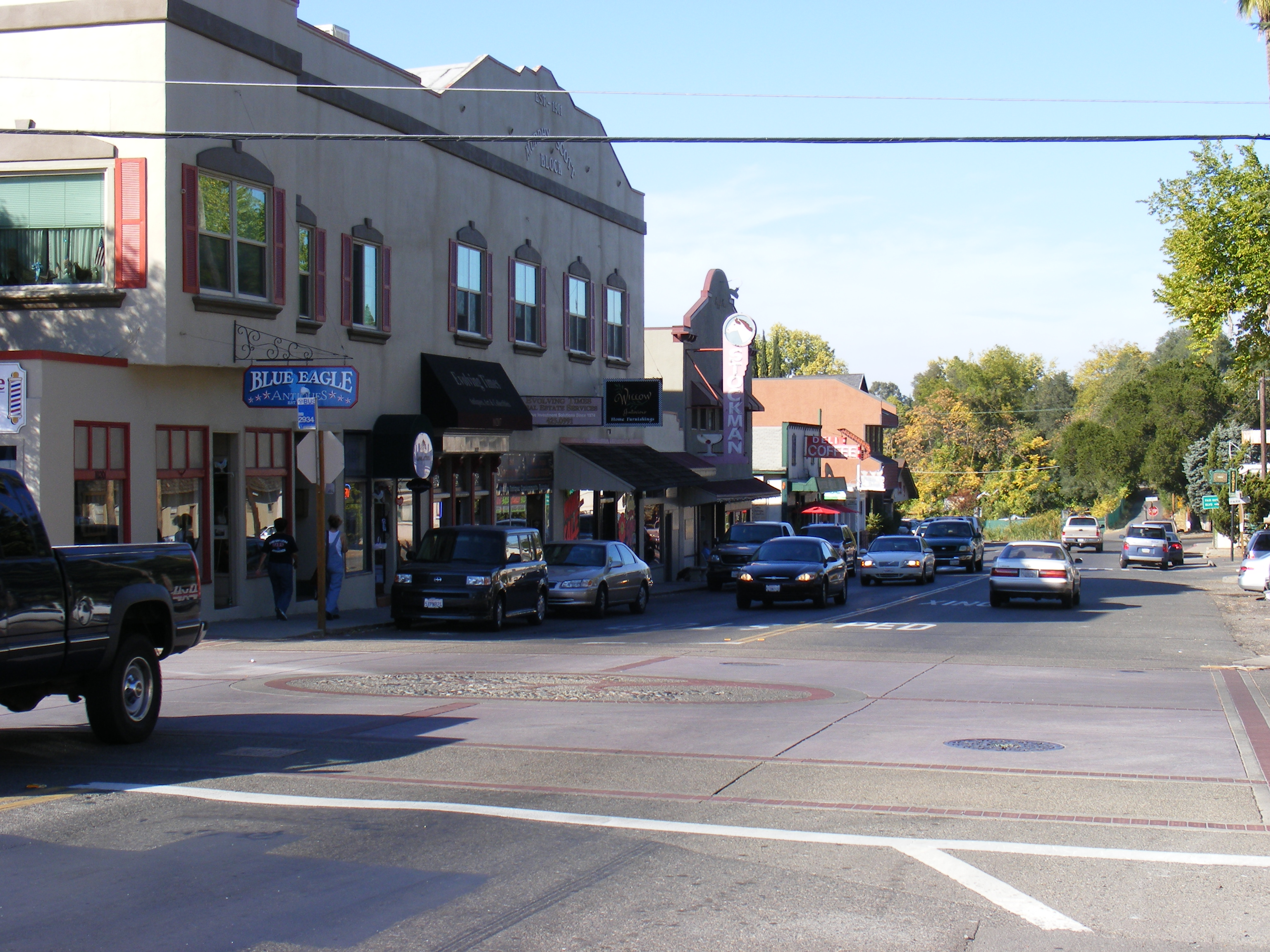
Fair Oaks Blvd as it passes through Fair Oaks Village

=== Highways ===
The main freeways used to access Fair Oaks are:

Interstate 80 (West-San Francisco, East-Reno)- Fair Oaks can be accessed through the Auburn Blvd and Madison Ave Exit traveling through Carmichael.

Interstate 80 Business (West-Sacramento) - Splits off of I-80 and be accessed by Auburn Blvd through SR-244.

Highway 50 (West-Sacramento, East-South Lake Tahoe) - Fair Oaks can be accessed through exits of Sunrise and Hazel Ave, passing through the community of Gold River and passing the Sunrise Ave and Hazel Ave Bridges.

State Route 244 - Unmarked portion of Highway accessible from Auburn Blvd (Winding Way from Fair Oaks) which provides access to I-80 and I-80 Business.

=== Major roads ===
The main boulevards and other major roads are:

- Madison Avenue (east–west)

- Sunrise Boulevard (County Highway E2) (north–south)

- Hazel Avenue (County Highway E3) (north–south)

- Sunset Avenue (east–west)

- Fair Oaks Boulevard (east–west)

Other significant roads:

- Sunset Avenue (east-west)

- Winding Way (east-west)

=== Traffic ===
The Sunrise Ave Bridge is heavily congested in the morning southbound, and in the afternoon northbound from Highway 50.

== Public library ==
Fair Oaks' public library, which is part of the Sacramento Public Library system, is located at 11601 Fair Oaks Boulevard, near the corner of Madison Avenue, and adjacent to Fair Oaks Park. Fair Oaks Library is open seven days a week:

Monday, Tuesday, Wednesday, and Thursday 10am - 7pm

Friday and Saturday 10am - 5pm

Sunday 12pm - 5pm

== Notable people ==
- Lynn Anderson, singer, best known for (I Never Promised You a) Rose Garden
- Barbara Alby, former California State Assemblywoman, 5th district
- Matt Barnes, professional basketball player
- Joe Carnahan, Smokin' Aces director and worked briefly on Mission: Impossible III before quitting the project
- Geoffrey Carter, Australian-American composer, musician, producer, physicist, and engineer
- Delvin Countess, professional soccer player
- Dave Cox, California state senator, 1st district
- Carl Cranke, professional motorcycle enduro racer and member of the AMA Motorcycle Hall of Fame
- Steve Cronin, professional soccer player
- Andy Fox, former shortstop for Arizona Diamondbacks, coach for Florida Marlins; lives in Fair Oaks
- Beth Gaines, California State Assemblywoman from Roseville; grew up in Fair Oaks, attended the former La Sierra High School
- Taylor Graham, professional soccer player
- Christianne Klein, actor and TV personality, former ABC News correspondent and entrepreneur
- Gabriela Knutson, American-born Czech tennis player
- Sam Long (born 1995), San Francisco Giants baseball player
- Joan Lunden, former host of Good Morning America
- Gavin Newsom, governor of California (maintains his private residency in the town)
- Roger Niello, California State Assemblyman, 5th district; Niello Motors
- Tyler Robertson, professional baseball player
- Rick Schu, former professional baseball player
- Nicholas Sparks, author of The Notebook, A Walk to Remember, and Dear John, others
- Matt Walbeck, former catcher for Chicago Cubs, former coach for Texas Rangers; lives in Fair Oaks
