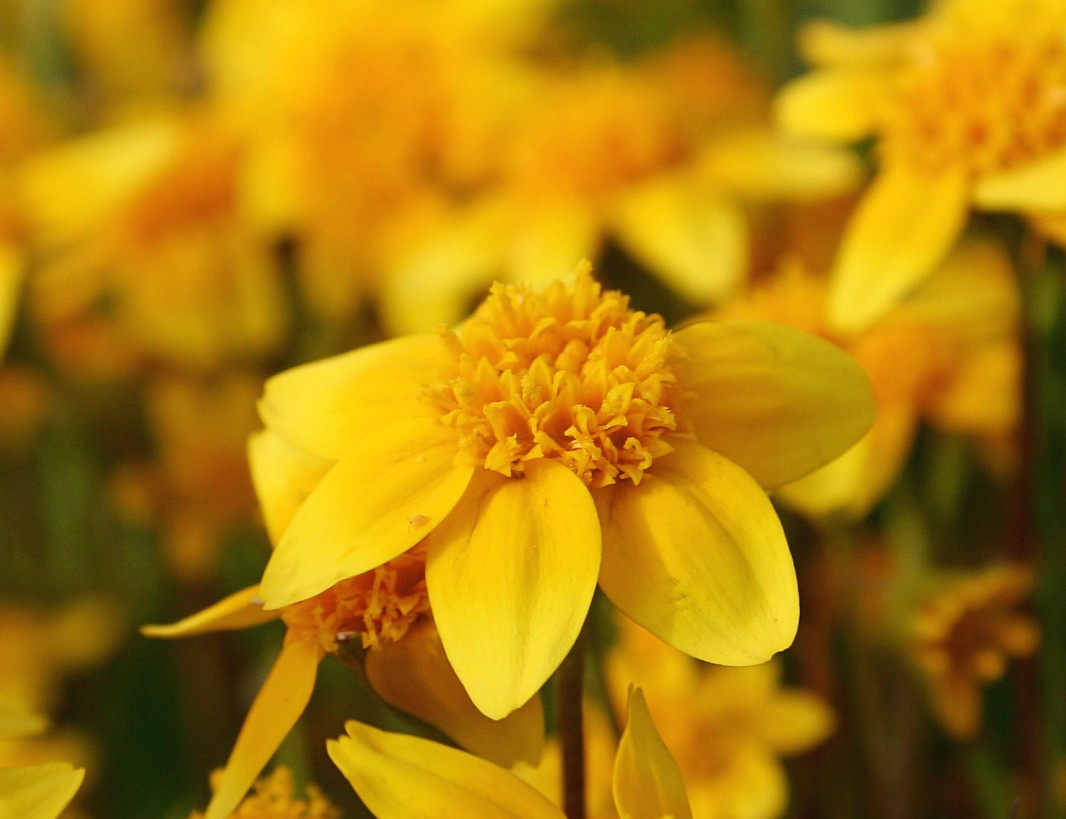

Scientific classification
- Kingdom: Plantae
- Clade: Tracheophytes
- Clade: Angiosperms
- Clade: Eudicots
- Clade: Asterids
- Order: Asterales
- Family: Asteraceae
- Genus: Lasthenia
- Species: L. californica

Binomial name
- Lasthenia californica DC. ex Lindl.

= Lasthenia californica =

Species of flowering plant

Lasthenia californica is a species of flowering plant in the family Asteraceae known by the common name California goldfields. It is native to western North America.

== Description ==
L. californica is an annual herb approaching a maximum height near 40 centimetres (16 inches), but generally staying much smaller. The plant is quite variable in appearance across subspecies and climates. The leaves are hairy, somewhat linear in shape, and about 1–7 cm (3/8–2 3/4 in) long. Individuals growing along the coast may have fleshy leaves.

Between March and May, the hairy stems are topped by inflorescences of flower heads, 2–2.5 cm (3/4–1 in) across, with hairy phyllaries. The head contains many yellow disc florets with a fringe of about 10 small ray florets. Large populations of this species bloom at once in the spring to produce the carpets of yellow on hillsides and in meadows that give the plant its common name. The seed sometimes has brownish scales at the tip.

Crocidium multicaule is similar in appearance, but most of its leaves are in a basal rosette, with alternate leaves on the stem.

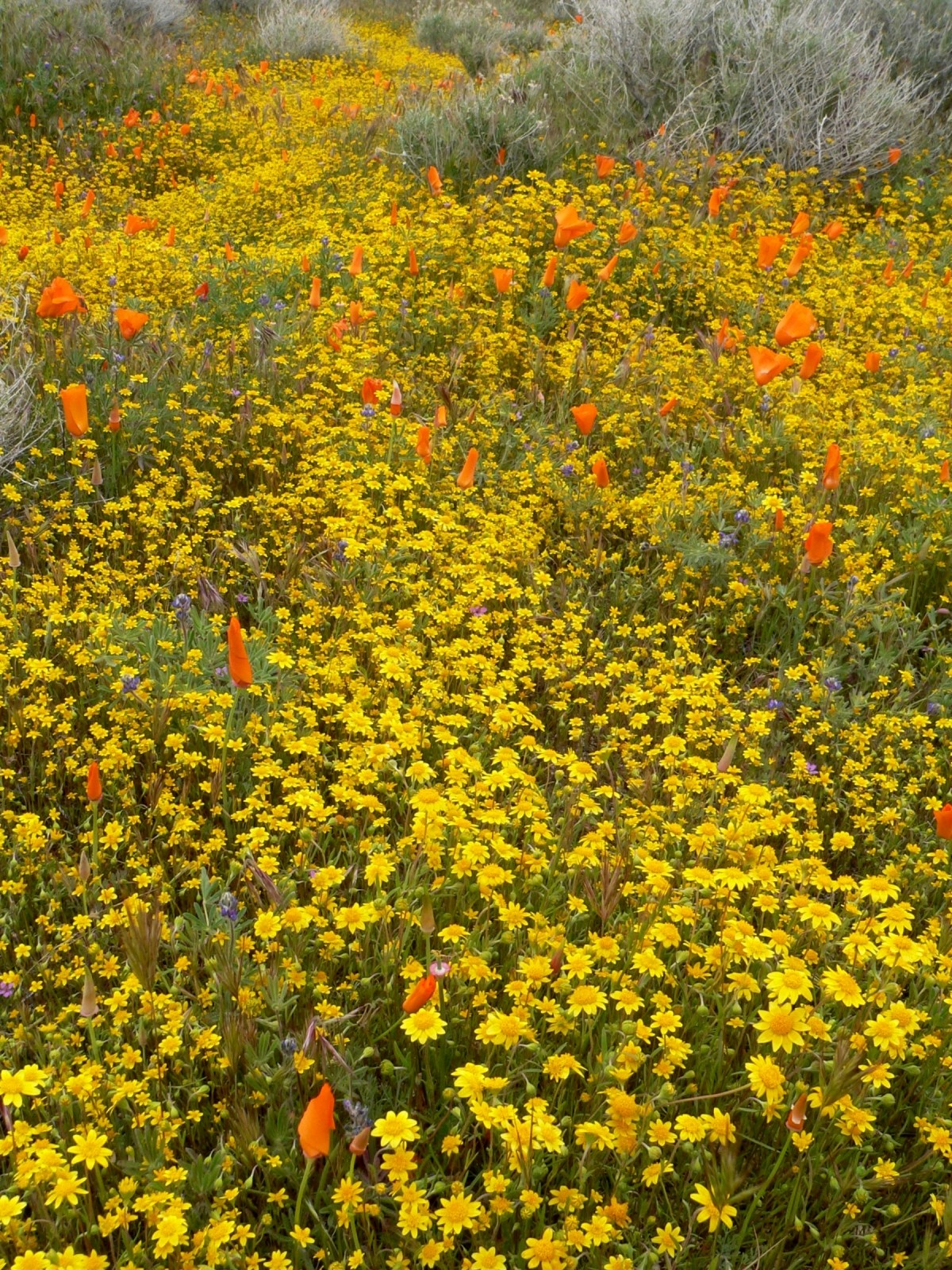
Goldfields (with a few California poppies)

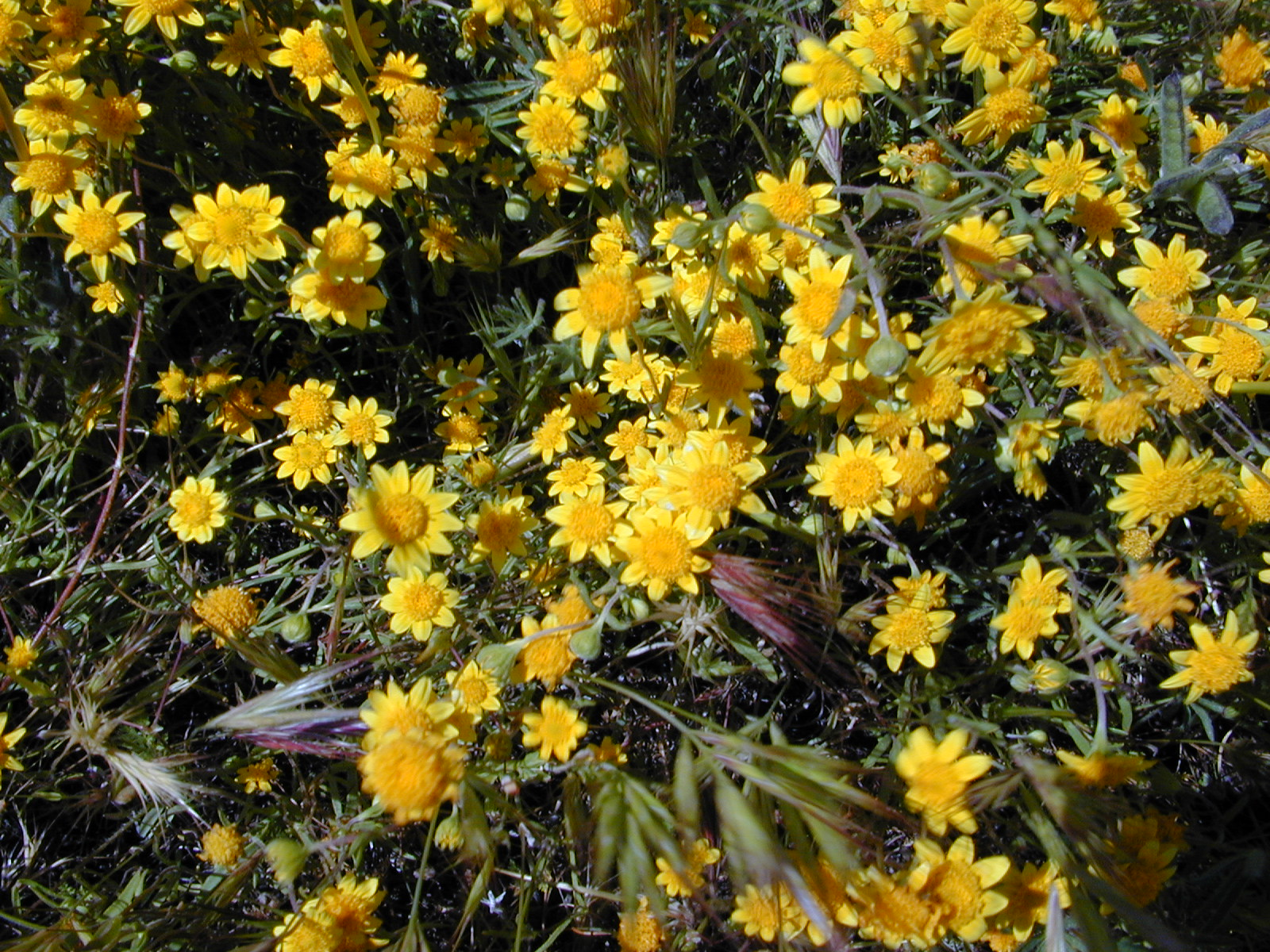
Antelope Valley California Poppy Reserve

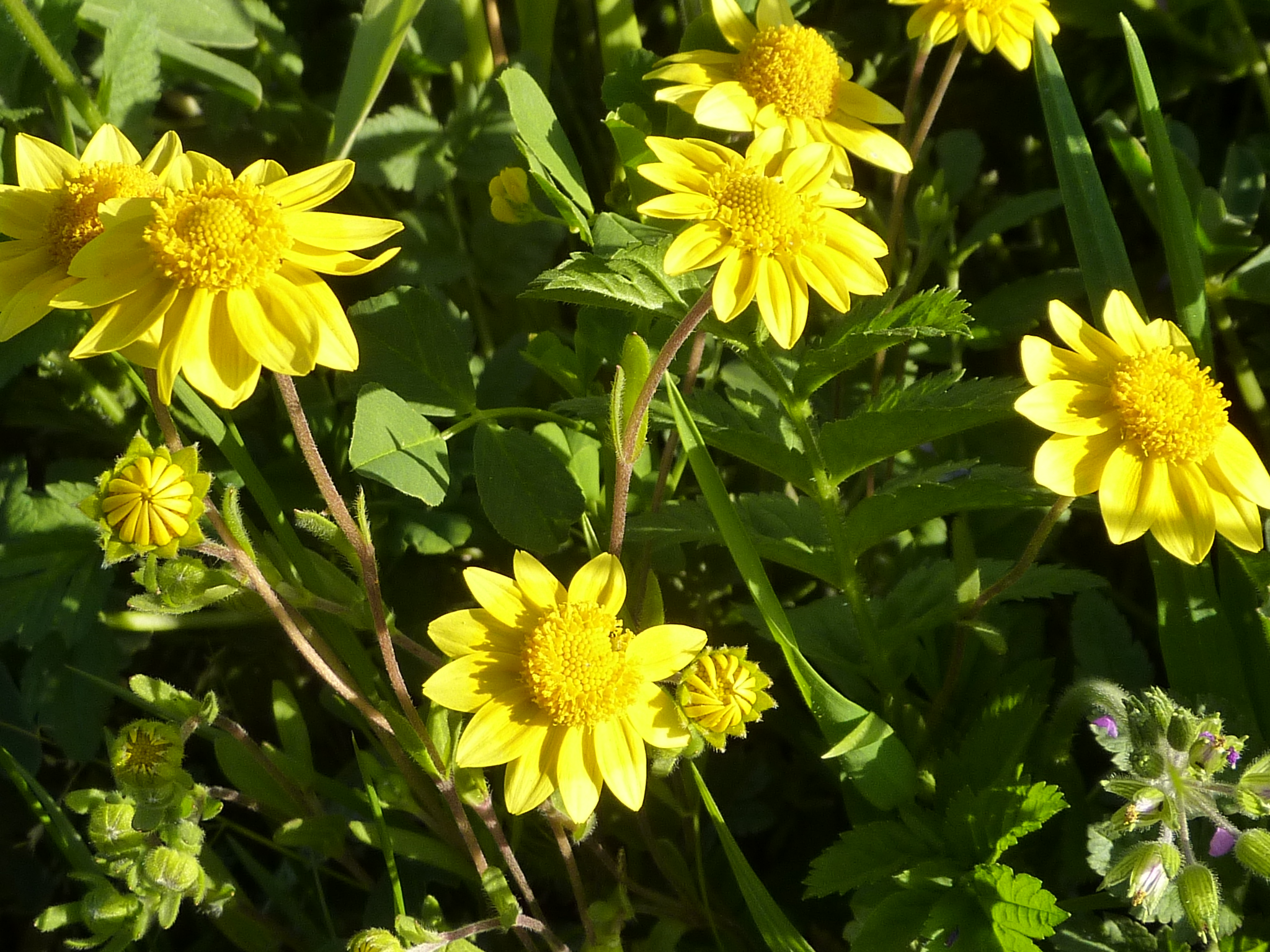
Close-up of flowers in Fremont, California

== Taxonomy ==
The species is placed by some in the genus Baeria.

== Distribution and habitat ==
The plant can be found in California, Oregon, Arizona and Baja California. It thrives in open fields and slopes at low elevations, especially in poor grassless soils with adequate moisture.
