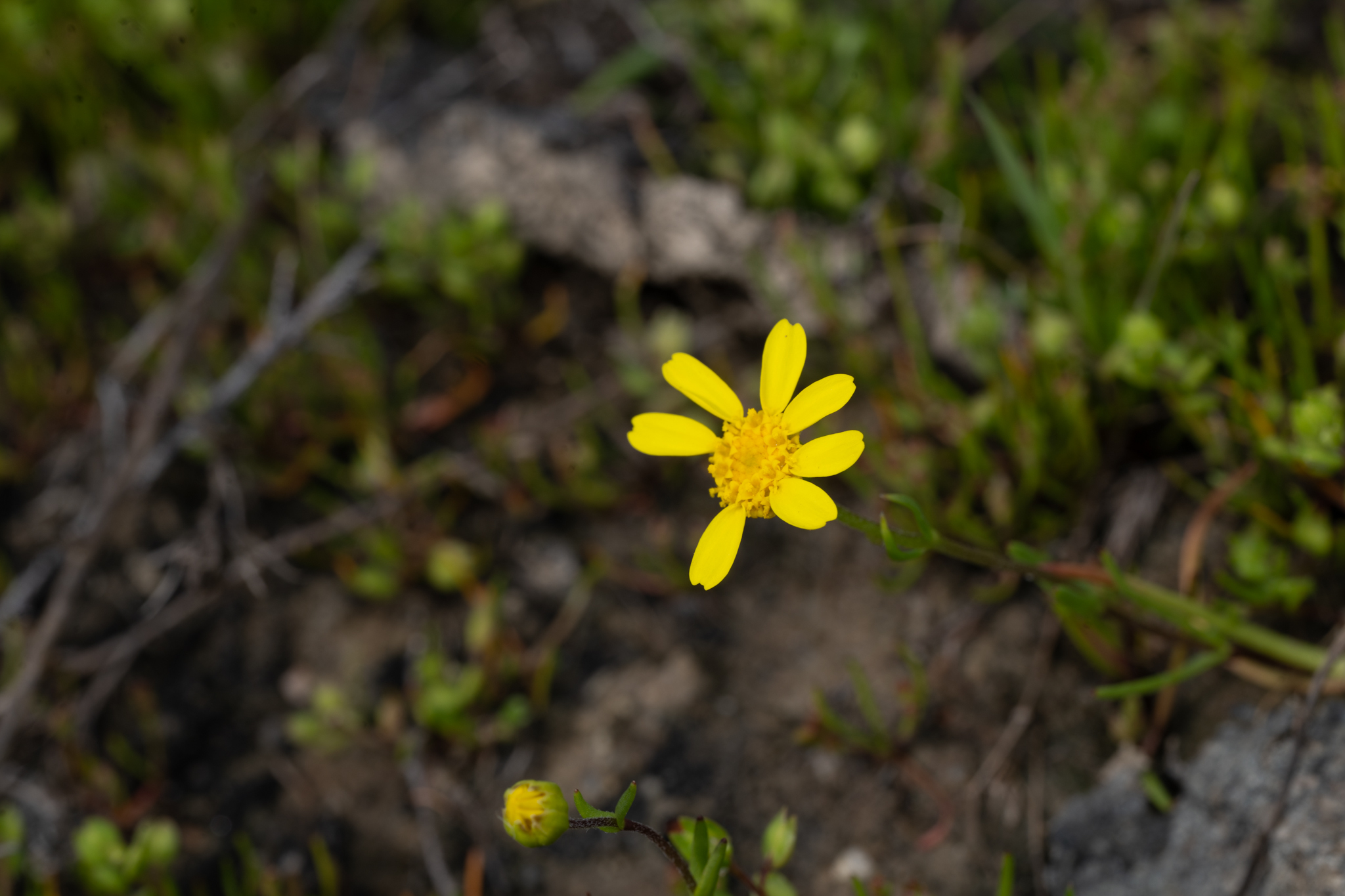

Scientific classification
- Kingdom: Plantae
- Clade: Tracheophytes
- Clade: Angiosperms
- Clade: Eudicots
- Clade: Asterids
- Order: Asterales
- Family: Asteraceae
- Genus: Lasthenia
- Species: L. chrysantha

Binomial name
- Lasthenia chrysantha (Greene ex Gray) Greene

Synonyms
- Crockeria chrysantha

= Lasthenia chrysantha =

Species of flowering plant

Lasthenia chrysantha is a species of flowering plant in the family Asteraceae known by the common name alkalisink goldfields. It is endemic to the California Central Valley, where it grows in vernal pools and alkali flats.

== Description ==
Lasthenia chrysantha is an annual herb approaching a maximum height near 28 centimeters. The stem may be branched or not and it bears mostly hairless, linear leaves up to 7 or 8 centimeters long.

Atop the hairy to hairless stems are inflorescences of flower heads with hairless phyllaries. The head contains many yellow disc florets with a fringe of small yellow ray florets. The fruit is a black oval-shaped achene a few millimeters long with a fringe of tiny dull hairs around the edge. Like other goldfields, populations of this species bloom in the spring to produce a carpet of yellow in its habitat.
