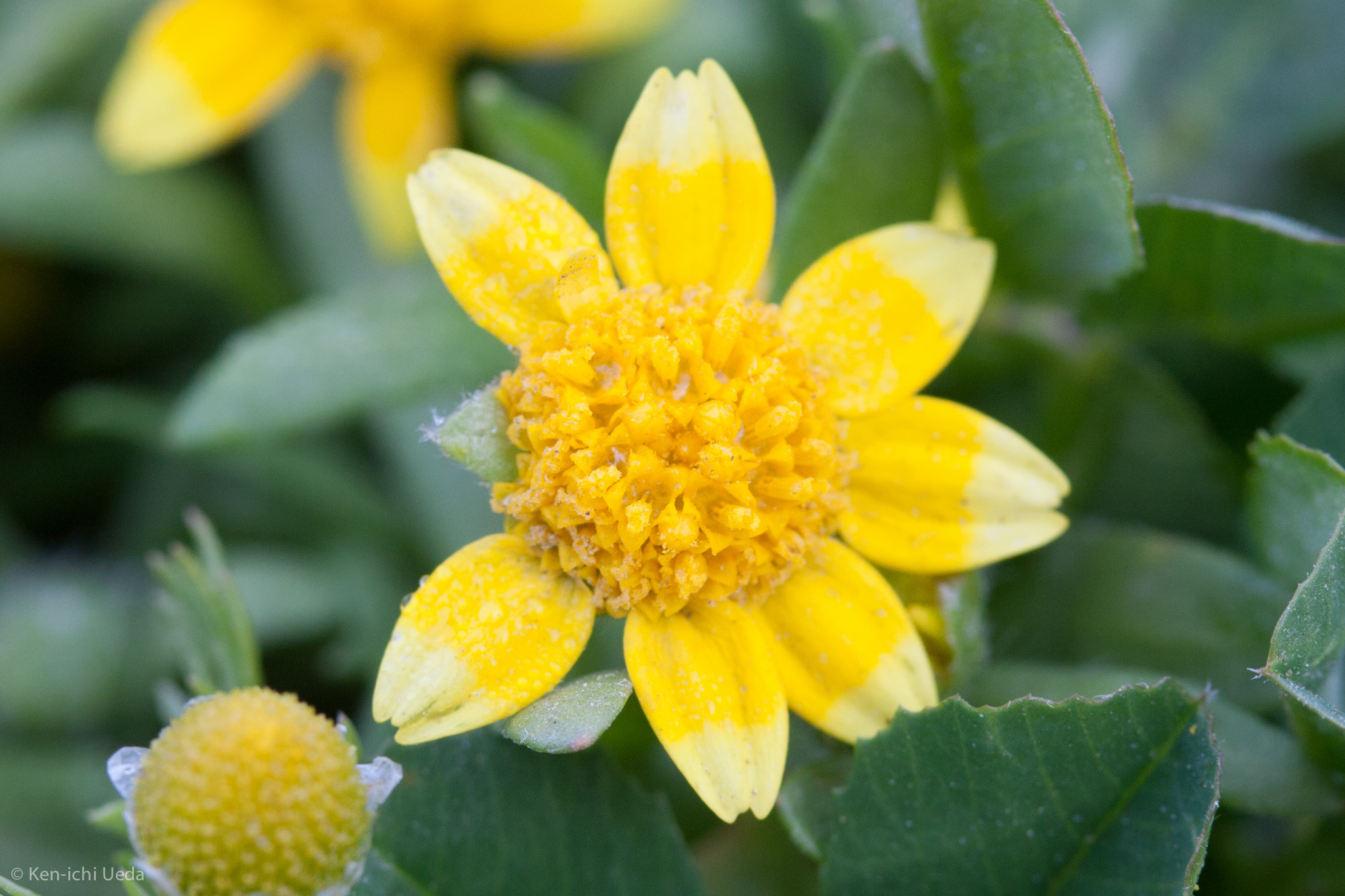

Scientific classification
- Kingdom: Plantae
- Clade: Tracheophytes
- Clade: Angiosperms
- Clade: Eudicots
- Clade: Asterids
- Order: Asterales
- Family: Asteraceae
- Genus: Lasthenia
- Species: L. minor

Binomial name
- Lasthenia minor (DC.) Ornduff

= Lasthenia minor =

Species of flowering plant

Lasthenia minor is a species of flowering plant in the family Asteraceae known by the common name coastal goldfields. It is endemic to California, where it is a resident of coastal and inland grassland habitat.

== Description ==
Lasthenia minor is an annual herb growing erect to a maximum height near 35 centimeters. The woolly stem may be branched or not and has oppositely-arranged pairs of linear leaves.

The flower heads are under a centimeter wide and have hairy phyllaries and golden yellow ray and disc florets.

The fruit is an achene up to about two millimeters long with a pappus of scales.
