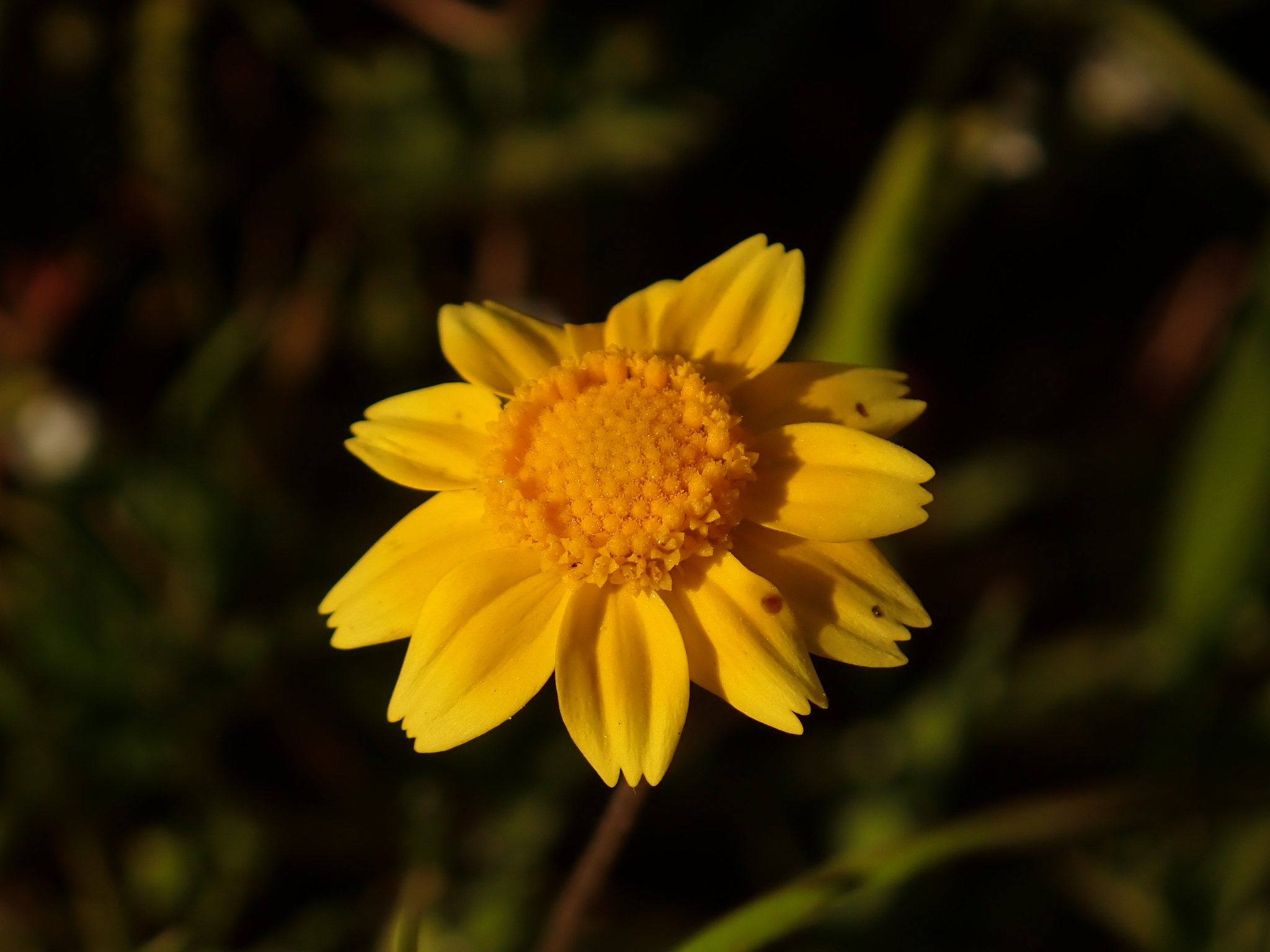

Scientific classification
- Kingdom: Plantae
- Clade: Tracheophytes
- Clade: Angiosperms
- Clade: Eudicots
- Clade: Asterids
- Order: Asterales
- Family: Asteraceae
- Genus: Lasthenia
- Species: L. fremontii

Binomial name
- Lasthenia fremontii (Torr. ex Gray) Greene

Synonyms
- Baeria fremontii

= Lasthenia fremontii =

Species of flowering plant

Lasthenia fremontii is a species of flowering plant in the family Asteraceae known by the common name Frémont's goldfields (after John C. Frémont). It is endemic to the California Central Valley, where it grows in vernal pools and meadows.

== Description ==
Lasthenia fremontii is an annual herb approaching a maximum height near 35 centimeters. The hairy stem may be branched or not and it bears linear or few-lobed leaves up to about 6 centimeters long.

Atop the stems are inflorescences of flower heads with hairy phyllaries. The head contains many tufted yellow disc florets with a fringe of small yellow or occasionally white ray florets.

The fruit is a hairy club-shaped achene less than 2 millimeters long.
