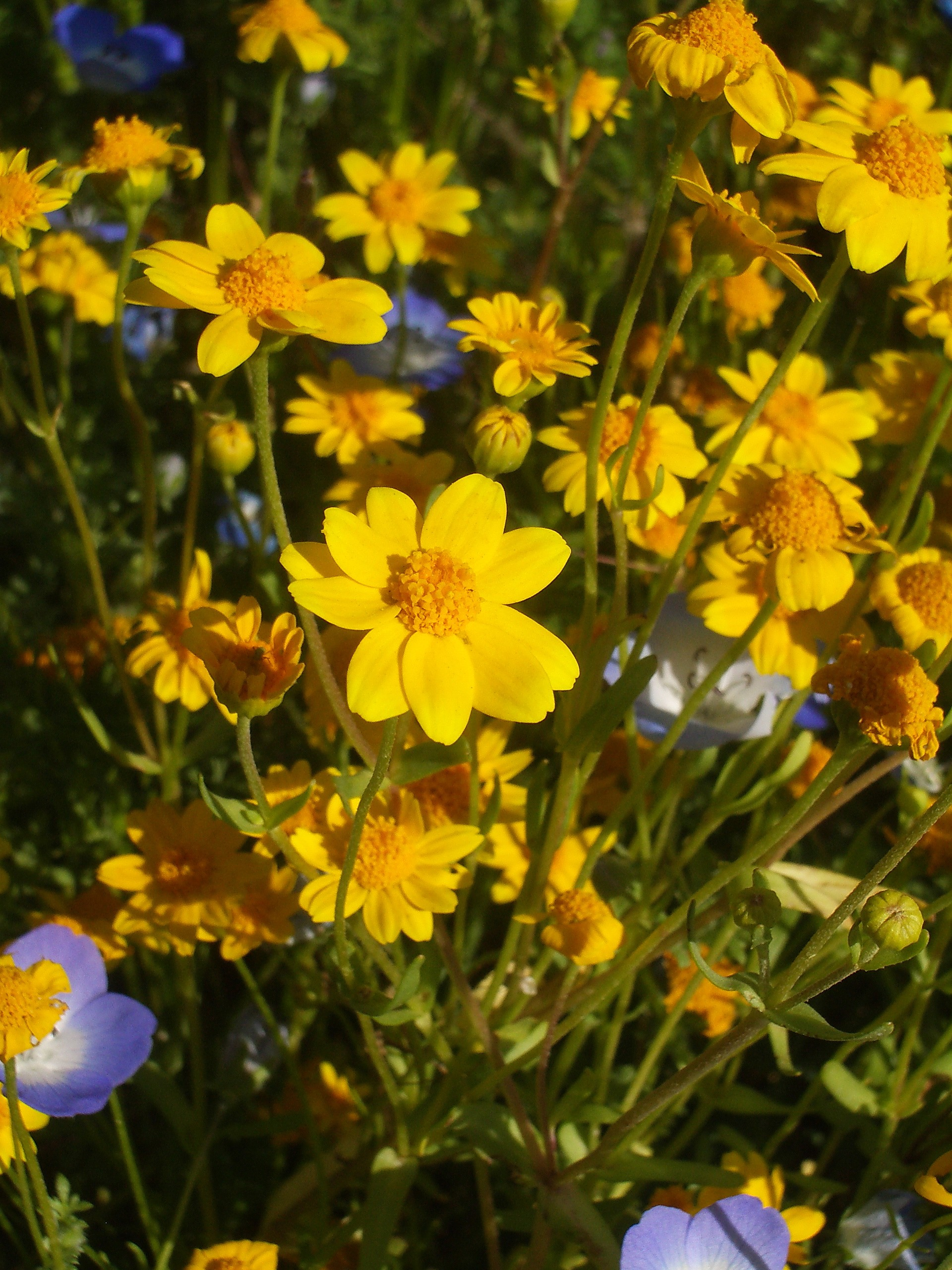

Scientific classification
- Kingdom: Plantae
- Clade: Tracheophytes
- Clade: Angiosperms
- Clade: Eudicots
- Clade: Asterids
- Order: Asterales
- Family: Asteraceae
- Genus: Lasthenia
- Species: L. glabrata

Binomial name
- Lasthenia glabrata Lindl.

Synonyms
- Baeria leptalea (A.Gray) A.Gray; Burrielia leptalea A.Gray; Lasthenia leptalea (A.Gray) Ornduff; Lasthenia coulteri (A.Gray) Greene, syn of subsp. coulteri

= Lasthenia glabrata =

Species of flowering plant

Lasthenia glabrata is a North American species of flowering plant in the family Asteraceae known by the common names yellowray goldfields and yellow-rayed lasthenia. It is endemic to California, where it is a resident of vernal pools and other moist areas in a number of habitat types. It is widespread across much of the state, from San Diego County to Tehama County.

== Description ==
Lasthenia glabrata is an annual herb growing up to 50 cm (19.5 in) tall. The thin stem has a few pairs of oppositely-arranged, smooth-edged linear leaves each up to 15 centimeters (5.9 inches) long.

The plant flowers in solitary or loosely clustered flower heads with 7-15 yellow ray florets surrounding numerous disc florets.

The fruit is an achene a few millimeters long with no pappus.

Subspecies

- Lasthenia glabrata subsp. glabrata - San Francisco Bay area, Orange County, mid part of Central Valley
- Lasthenia glabrata subsp. coulteri (A.Gray) Ornduff - southern California, northern Central Valley
