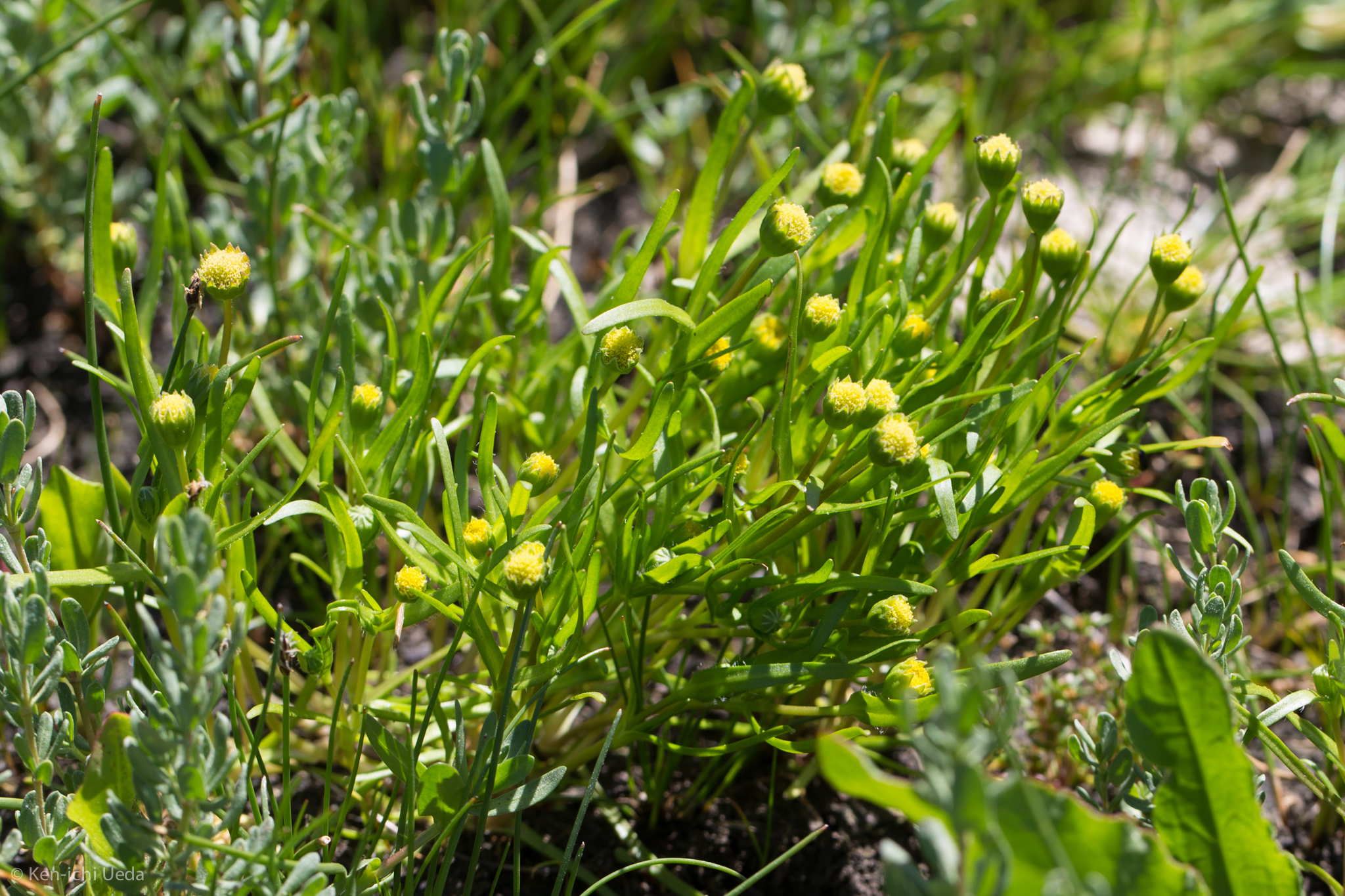

Scientific classification
- Kingdom: Plantae
- Clade: Tracheophytes
- Clade: Angiosperms
- Clade: Eudicots
- Clade: Asterids
- Order: Asterales
- Family: Asteraceae
- Genus: Lasthenia
- Species: L. glaberrima

Binomial name
- Lasthenia glaberrima DC.

= Lasthenia glaberrima =

Species of flowering plant

Lasthenia glaberrima is a species of flowering plant in the family Asteraceae known by the common names smooth goldfields and rayless goldfields. It is native to western North America from British Columbia to California, where it grows in wet meadows and vernal pools.

== Description ==
Lasthenia glaberrima is an annual herb producing a mostly erect, hairless stem to maximum heights near 35 centimeters. The stem may branch or not, and it bears hairless linear leaves up to about 10 centimeters long.

Atop the stem is an inflorescence of flower heads with fused, pointed phyllaries. The head contains many yellowish or greenish disc florets. There are also yellow ray florets, but they are so short they may be nearly invisible inside the involucre of phyllaries.

The fruit is a hairy achene a few millimeters long which is linear in shape with a pappus of scales.
