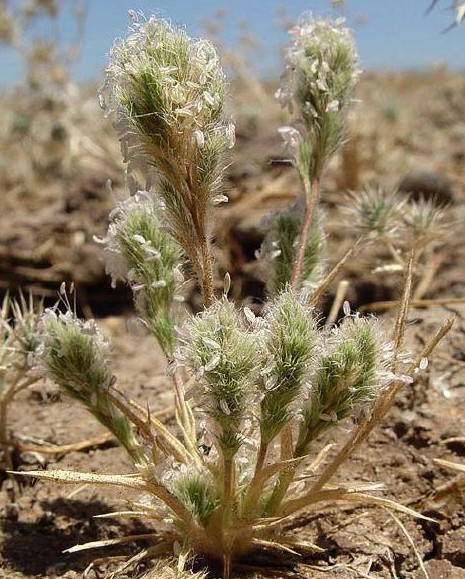

Conservation status
- Endangered (ESA)

Scientific classification
- Kingdom: Plantae
- Clade: Tracheophytes
- Clade: Angiosperms
- Clade: Monocots
- Clade: Commelinids
- Order: Poales
- Family: Poaceae
- Subfamily: Chloridoideae
- Genus: Orcuttia
- Species: O. viscida

Binomial name
- Orcuttia viscida (Hoover) J.Reeder

= Orcuttia viscida =

Species of flowering plant

Orcuttia viscida is a rare species of grass known by the common name Sacramento Orcutt grass.

== Distribution ==
It is endemic to Sacramento County, California, where it grows only in vernal pools, a rare and declining type of habitat. As of 1997, two of the nine known populations had been extirpated as habitat has been consumed for urban development, and it was federally listed as an endangered species.

Since its listing, one additional occurrence of the plant has been discovered, for a total of eight extant populations.

== Description ==
Orcuttia viscida is a small, hairy, aromatic annual grass forming sticky, glandular tufts up to 10 or 15 centimeters in maximum height. The inflorescence is a small, crowded cluster of spikelets with awned tips that curve outward at maturity, giving the spikes a bristly appearance.
