= Mount Huntington =

Mount Huntington may refer to one of three peaks in the United States:

- Mount Huntington (Alaska)
- Mount Huntington (California)
- Mount Huntington (New Hampshire), see List of mountains of New Hampshire
