= Caltech Peak =

Mountain in the state of California

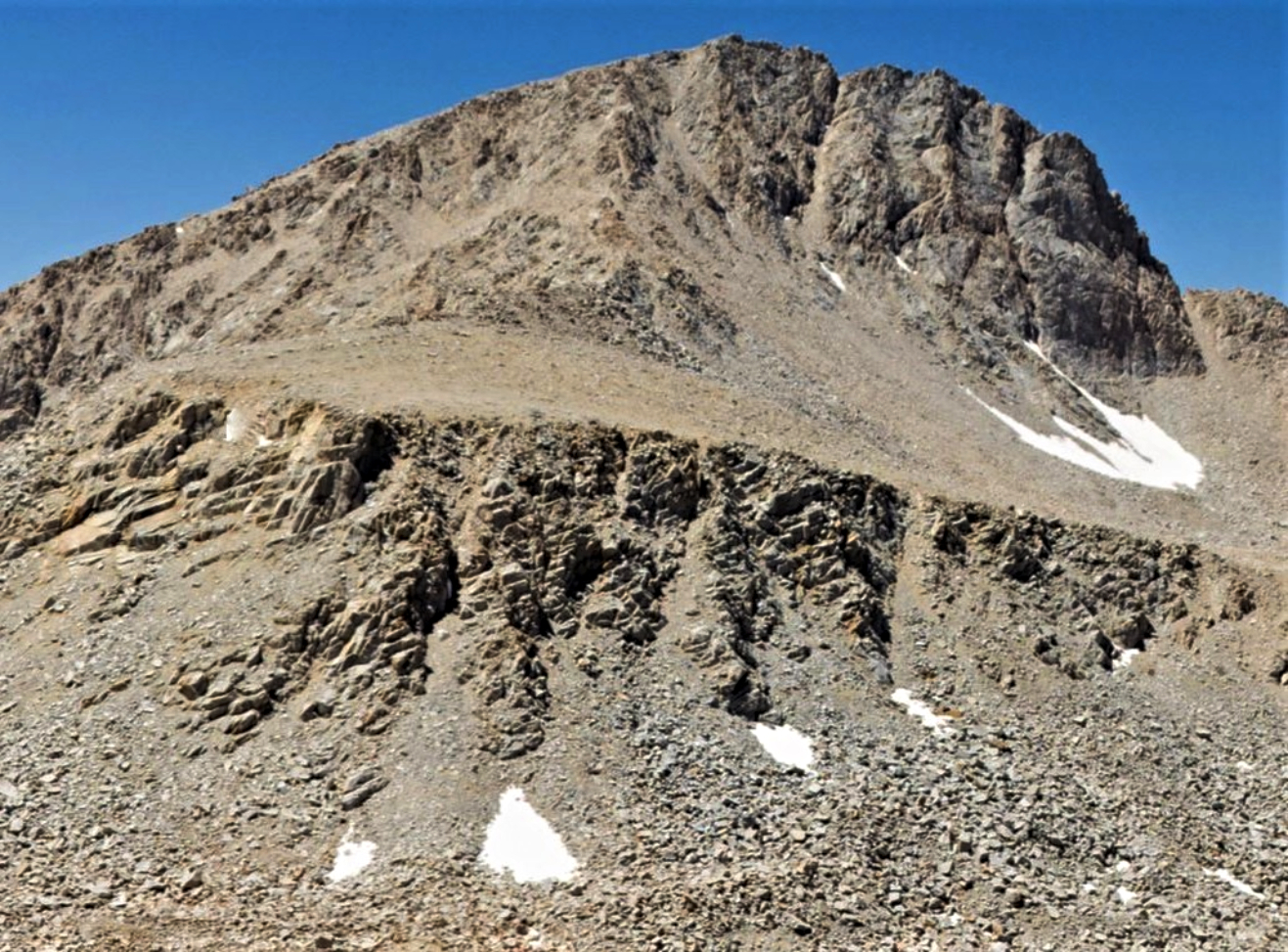
- Northeast aspect

Highest point
- Elevation: 13,832 ft (4,216 m)
- Prominence: 512 ft (156 m)
- Parent peak: Mount Stanford (13,979 ft)
- Isolation: 1.08 mi (1.74 km)
- Listing: Sierra Peaks Section
- Coordinates: 36°41′18″N 118°23′26″W

Naming
- Etymology: California Institute of Technology

Geography
- Location within California Location within the United States
- Country: United States
- State: California
- County: Tulare
- Protected area: Sequoia National Park
- Parent range: Sierra Nevada
- Topo map: USGS Mount Brewer

Geology
- Rock age: Cretaceous
- Mountain type: Fault block
- Rock type: granitic

Climbing
- Easiest route: class 2 Southeast slope

Caltech Peak is a 13,832-foot-elevation (4,216-meter) mountain summit located in Sequoia National Park in Tulare County, California. It is situated one mile west of the crest of the Sierra Nevada mountain range, just one-half mile south of the Kings–Kern Divide, one mile south of line parent Mount Stanford, and 9.3 miles northwest of Mount Whitney. Caltech Peak ranks as the 24th-highest summit in California. Topographic relief is significant as the southwest aspect rises nearly 1,900 feet (580 meters) above Lake South America in 0.7 miles (1.1 km). The John Muir Trail traverses below the east aspect of the mountain, providing an approach option for climbers.

== History ==
The first ascent of the summit was made June 22, 1926, by Norman Clyde, who is credited with 130 first ascents, most of which were in the Sierra Nevada.

This mountain's toponym was officially adopted in 1961 by the U.S. Board on Geographic Names to commemorate California Institute of Technology (Caltech).

== Climate ==
Caltech Peak is located in an alpine climate zone. Most weather fronts originate in the Pacific Ocean, and travel east toward the Sierra Nevada mountains. As fronts approach, they are forced upward by the peaks (orographic lift), causing them to drop their moisture in the form of rain or snowfall onto the range. Precipitation runoff from this mountain drains into headwaters of the Kern River.

== Gallery ==
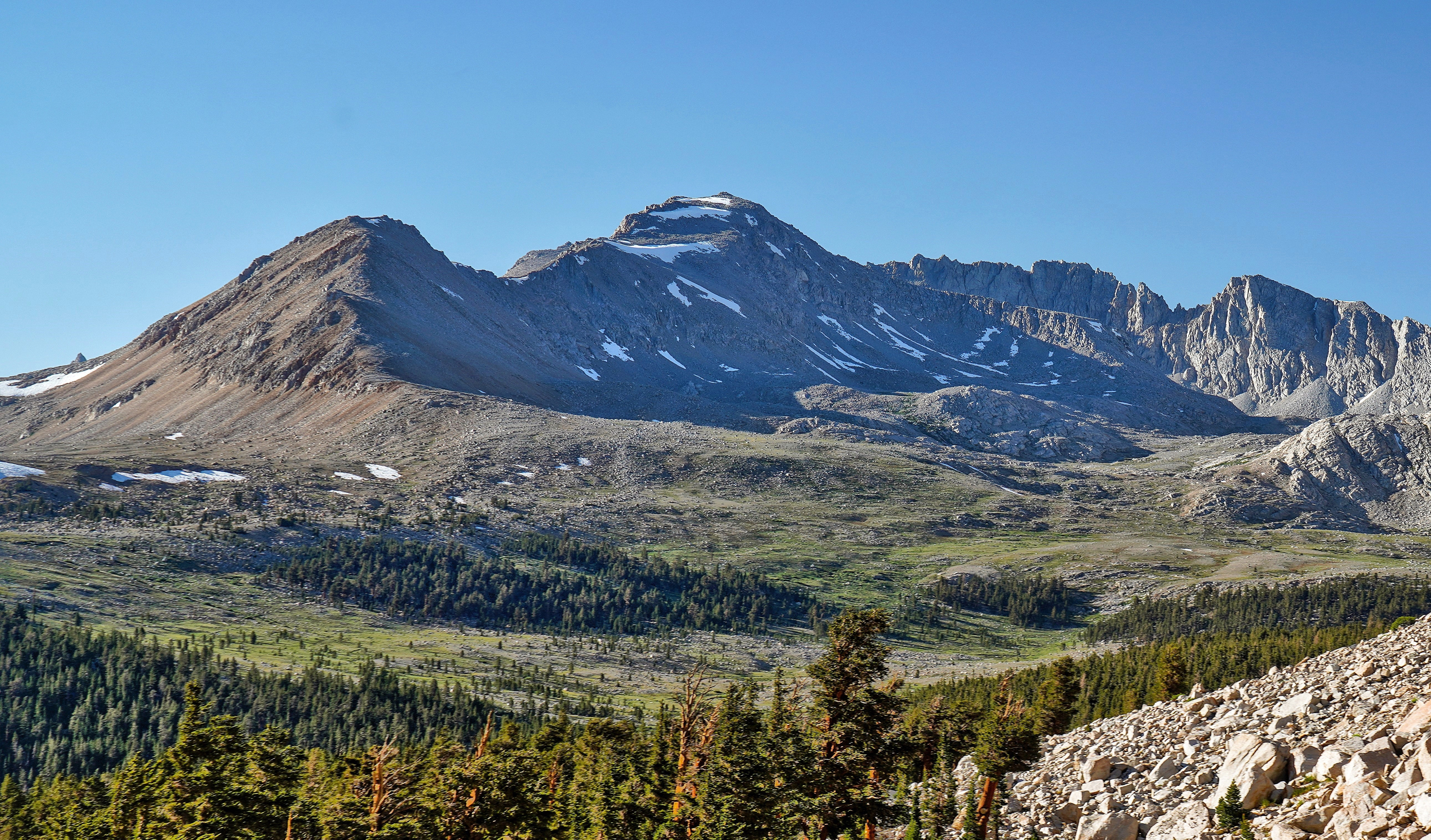
South aspect

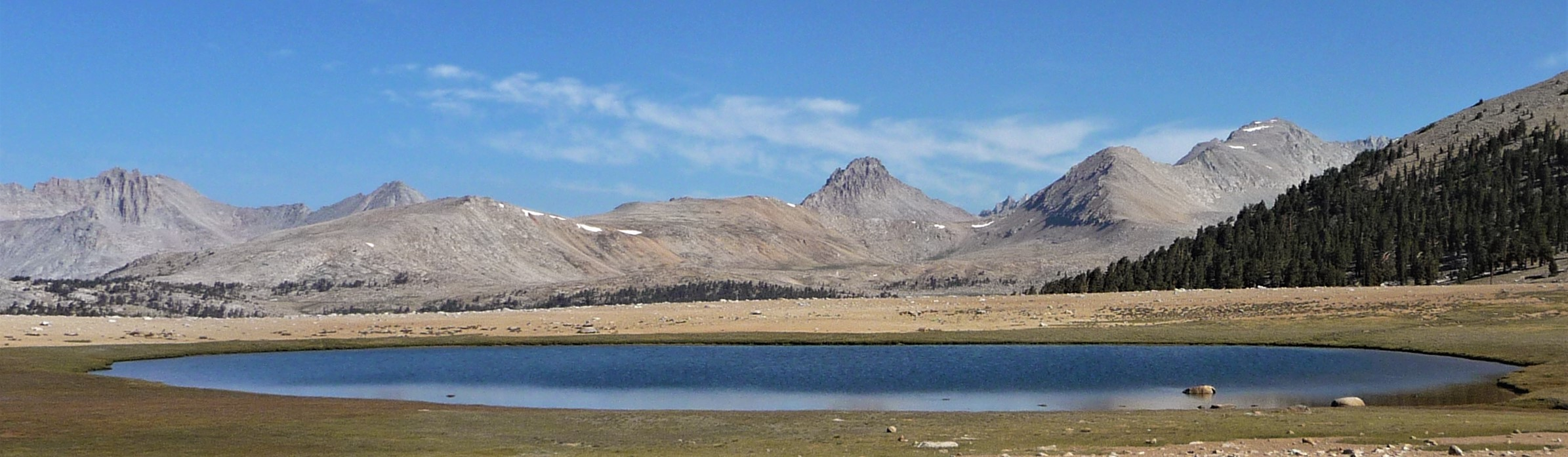
Caltech Peak to far right seen from Bighorn Plateau. (Mt. Ericsson right of center). Camera pointed NNW.

== See also ==
- List of the major 4000-meter summits of California
