= Rancho Agua Caliente (Alameda County) =

Mexican land grant in California

Coordinates: 37.510°N 121.910°W

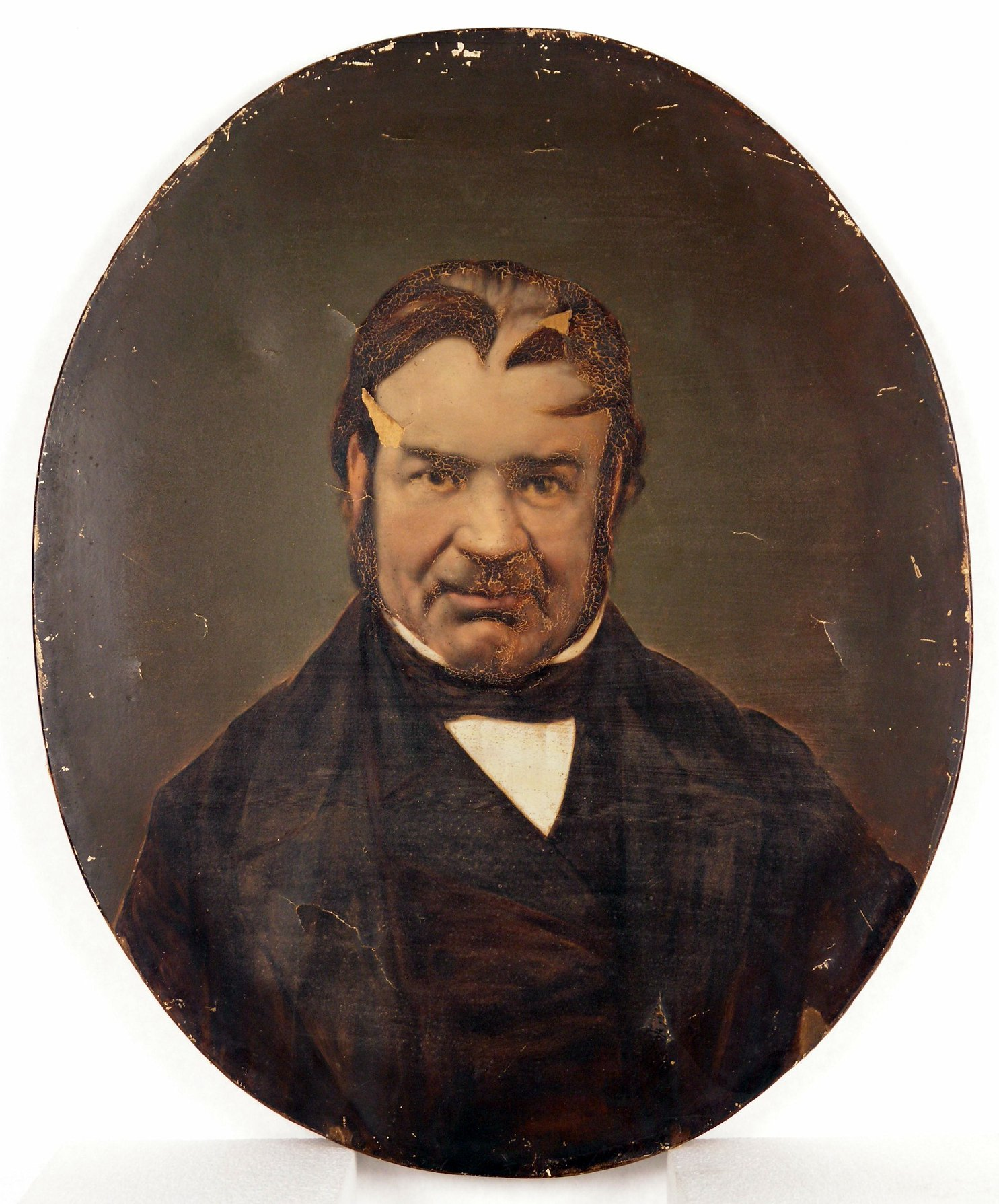
Don Antonio Suñol was granted Rancho Agua Caliente in 1836. He sold it to Fulgencio Higuera in 1839

Rancho Agua Caliente was a 9,564-acre (38.70 km^{2}) Mexican land grant in present-day Alameda County, California granted in 1836 by Governor Nicolás Gutiérrez to Antonio Suñol and confirmed in 1839 by Governor Juan Alvarado to Fulgencio Higuera. The name means "warm water" and refers to the warm springs located in the foothills a short distance south of Mission San José. The grant is just south of present-day Fremont.

== History ==
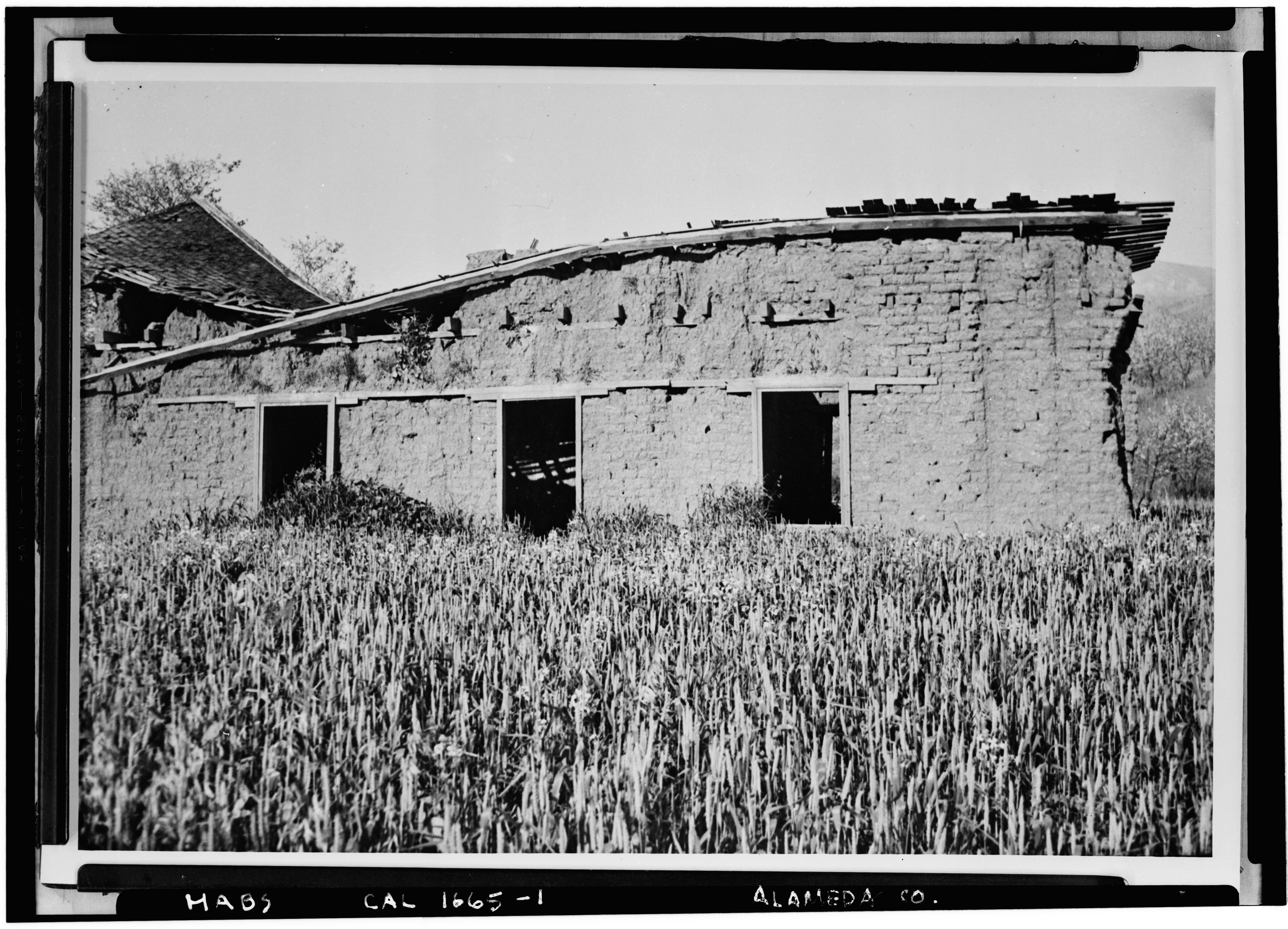
Fulgencio Higuera Adobe, Rancho Agua Caliente. 1940 Historic American Buildings Survey.

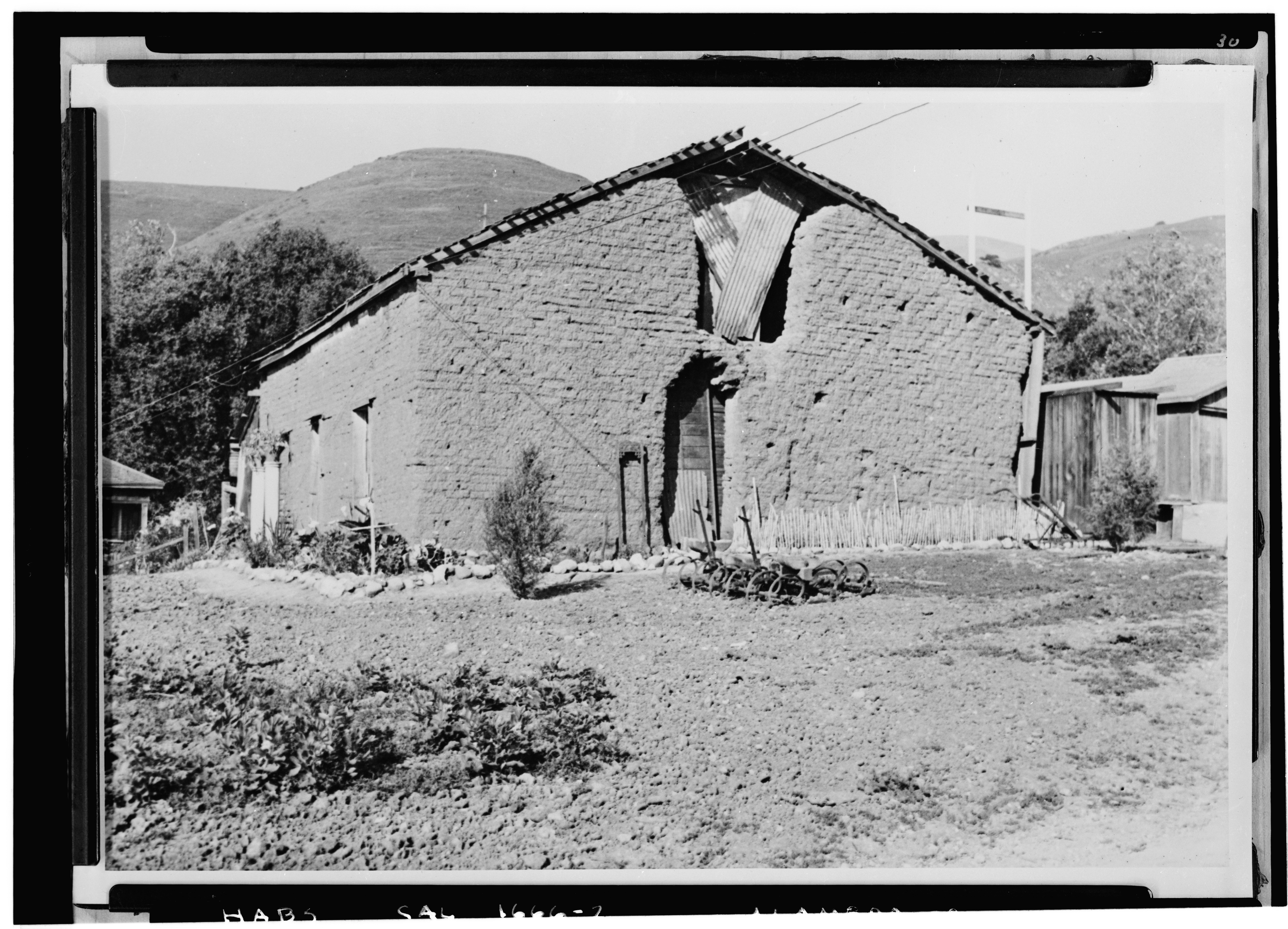
Abelardo Higuera Adobe, Rancho Agua Caliente.

Fulgencio Higuera (1799–1878), was the son of Jose Loreto Higuera (1778–1845), grantee of Rancho Los Tularcitos, and grandson of Ygnacio Anastacio Higuera, who came to California with the De Anza Expedition. His brother Valentin Higuera was the grantee of Rancho Pescadero. In 1820, Fulgencio Higuera married Maria Clara Saturnina Pacheco. In 1836 Fulgencio Higuera was granted the two square league Rancho Agua Caliente, formerly Mission San José land. In 1845, Higuera married Maria Celia Feliz.

With the cession of California to the United States following the Mexican–American War, the 1848 Treaty of Guadalupe Hidalgo provided that the land grants would be honored. As required by the Land Act of 1851, a claim for Rancho Agua Caliente was filed with the Public Land Commission in 1852, and the grant was patented to Fulgencio Higuera in 1858.

Higuera gradually sold off his holdings in the 1850s. An attorney, Abram Harris, purchased the southern portion of this land in 1858 and established what briefly became known as Harrisburg. In 1850, Clement Columbet bought 640 acres (2.6 km^{2}), and developed a resort and one of the state’s first wineries. However, the resort did not survive the 1868 Hayward earthquake. Leland Stanford bought the property in 1869 and founded Leland Stanford Winery at the corner of Stanford Ave and Vinyard Ave, in what is now Fremont. Thomas W. Millard, who had come from New York to California in 1853, bought a large portion of the Rancho in 1855.

== Historic sites of the Rancho ==
- Galindo Higuera Adobe.
- Leland Stanford Winery. This winery was founded in 1869 by Leland Stanford, and operated by his brother Josiah Stanford. The restored buildings and winery are now occupied and operated by Weibel Champagne Vineyards.
