= Rancho Pescadero (Grimes) =

Mexican land grant in California

Coordinates: 37.650°N 121.240°W

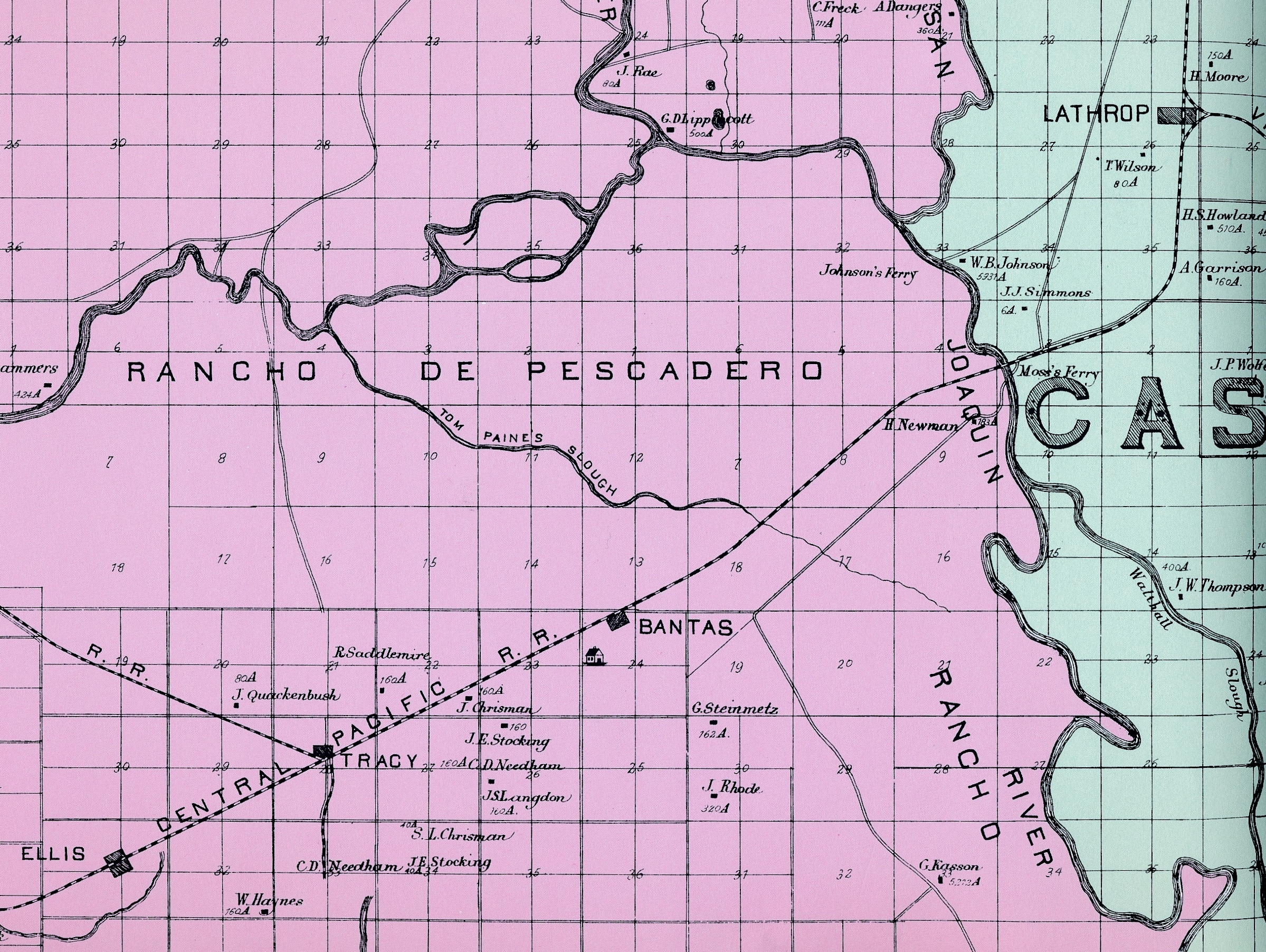
The site of Moss's Ferry (above the big C), or Mossdale, was a popular fishing spot (pescadero) for the indigenous Yokuts; 1879 Thompson & West map of part of San Joaquin County, California

Rancho Pescadero was a 35,446-acre (143.44 km^{2}) Mexican land grant in present-day Stanislaus County and San Joaquin County, California given in 1843 by Governor Manuel Micheltorena to Valentin Higuera and Rafael Feliz. The grant extended along the west bank of the San Joaquin River from north of Tracy and Banta in San Joaquin County to Del Puerto Creek and Rancho Del Puerto in Stanislaus County on the south, and encompassed present-day Grayson. The name pescadero, which means "fishing place" in Spanish, originated from a popular San Joaquin River fishing spot of the indigenous Yokuts near present-day Mossdale.

== History ==
Valentin Higuera and Rafael Feliz were granted the eight square league Rancho Pescadero in 1843. Valentin Higuera (1809–?) was the son of José Loreto Higuera, grantee of Rancho Los Tularcitos. In 1829, Valentin Higuera married Maria Margarita Sais (also spelled Saens, or Saez) (1811–1850). Valentin's brother, Fulgencio Higuera, was the grantee of Rancho Agua Caliente. In 1845, Fulgencio Higuera married Maria Celia Feliz. Antonio Rafael Feliz (1789–1850) was born in Los Angeles and died in San Jose.

Higuera sold the rancho to Hiram Grimes, Francis W. Grimes and William H. McKee in 1849. Hiram Grimes was nephew of Captain Eliab Grimes, grantee of Rancho Del Paso. Hiram Grimes also owned Rancho San Juan.

With the cession of California to the United States following the Mexican-American War, the 1848 Treaty of Guadalupe Hidalgo provided that the land grants would be honored. As required by the Land Act of 1851, a claim for Rancho Pescadero was filed with the Public Land Commission in 1852, and the grant was patented to Hiram Grimes, Francis W. Grimes and William H. McKee in 1858.

== Historic sites of the Rancho ==
- Site of San Joaquin City. A river-streamer stopping town was established in 1849, which was replaced by Vernalis in 1888 with the coming of the Southern Pacific Railroad.
- Site of the Mossdale Bridge, which was completed September 6, 1869, by Western Pacific Railroad (1862-1870). It was the first bridge across the San Joaquin River and the last link in the first transcontinental railroad from the Missouri River to the Pacific Ocean as authorized in the 1862 Pacific Railroad Acts.
