= Rancho San Juan =

Mexican land grant in California

Coordinates: 38.660°N 121.240°W

Rancho San Juan was a 19,983-acre (80.87 km^{2}) Mexican land grant in present-day Sacramento County, California given in 1844 by Governor Manuel Micheltorena to Joel P. Dedmond. The grant extended east of Captain Eliab Grimes Rancho Del Paso along the north bank of the American River, across from William Leidesdorff's Rancho Rio de los Americanos, and encompassed present-day Orangevale, Fair Oaks and most of Carmichael.

== History ==
Joel P. Dedmond, an American carpenter, returned from Honolulu on the Fama, and claimed he had been in California since 1838. He obtained Mexican citizenship, a lot in San Francisco, and the four and a half square league Rancho San Juan.

In 1847 Dedmond sold out his land to Hiram Grimes. Hiram Grimes was nephew of Captain Eliab Grimes. Hiram Grimes later owned Rancho Del Paso and Rancho Pescadero

With the cession of California to the United States following the Mexican–American War, the 1848 Treaty of Guadalupe Hidalgo provided that the land grants would be honored. As required by the Land Act of 1851, a claim for Rancho San Juan was filed with the Public Land Commission in 1852, and the grant was patented to Hiram Grimes in 1860.

Lawyers James Ben Ali Haggin (1822–1914) and Lloyd Tevis (1824–1899) acquired Rancho San Juan. In 1868, California Senator and President of California National Bank, Frederick K. Cox bought part of Rancho San Juan.
