= Mount Crocker =

Mountain in the state of California

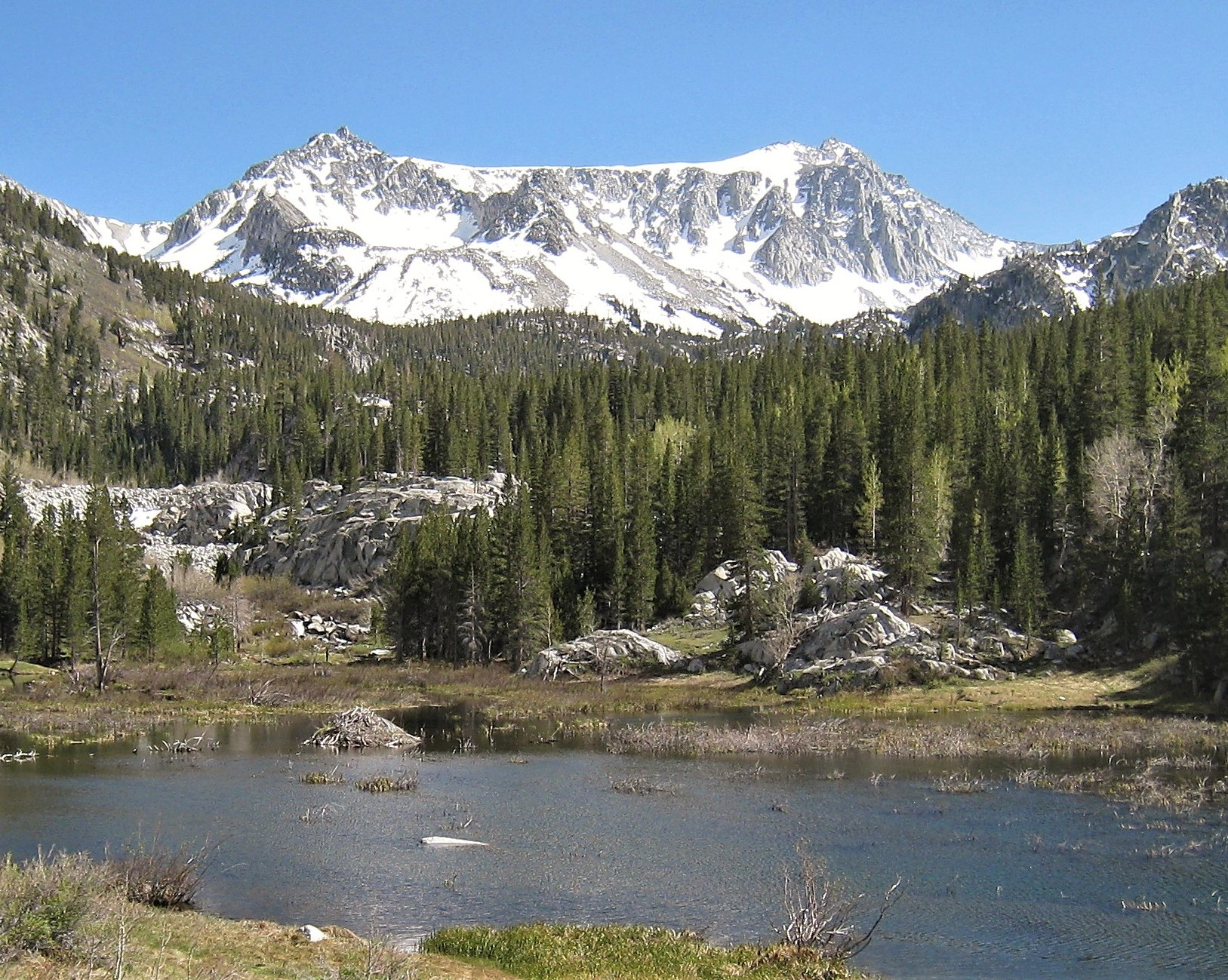
- North aspect, summit to right

Highest point
- Elevation: 12,458 ft (3,797 m)
- Prominence: 858 ft (262 m)
- Parent peak: Red and White Mountain
- Isolation: 1.77 mi (2.85 km)
- Listing: Vagmarken Club Sierra Crest List
- Coordinates: 37°28′59″N 118°49′31″W

Naming
- Etymology: Charles Crocker

Geography
- Location within California Location within the United States
- Country: United States
- State: California
- County: Fresno / Mono
- Protected area: John Muir Wilderness
- Parent range: Sierra Nevada
- Topo map: USGS Mount Abbot

Geology
- Rock age: Cretaceous
- Mountain type: Fault block
- Rock type: Granodiorite

Climbing
- First ascent: 1929
- Easiest route: class 3

Mount Crocker is a remote 12,458-foot-elevation (3,797-meter) mountain summit located on the crest of the Sierra Nevada mountain range in northern California, United States. It is situated in the John Muir Wilderness, on the boundary shared by Sierra National Forest with Inyo National Forest, and along the common border of Fresno County with Mono County. Crocker ranks as the 291st-highest summit in California. Topographic relief is significant as the north aspect rises 2,500 feet (760 meters) above McGee Creek in approximately one mile. It is nine miles northeast of Lake Thomas A Edison, and approximately 15 miles (24 km) southeast of the community of Mammoth Lakes.

== History ==
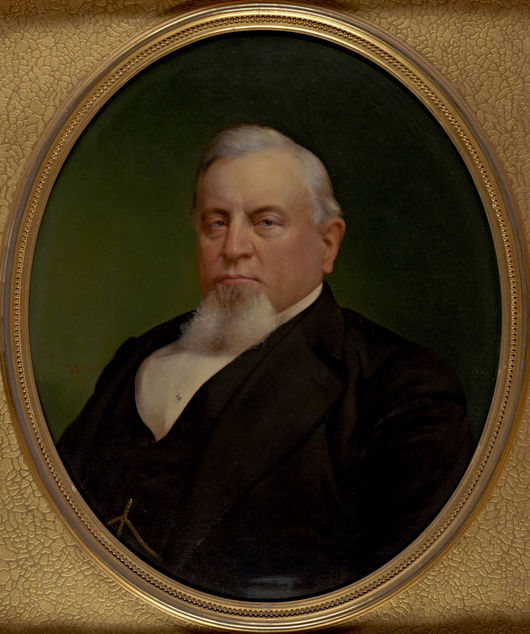
Charles Crocker

This mountain's toponym was officially adopted in 1911 by the U.S. Board on Geographic Names. The name was applied during a 1907–09 survey by Robert Bradford Marshall of the USGS to honor Charles Crocker (1822–1888), an American railroad executive who was one of the founders of the Central Pacific Railroad, which constructed the westernmost portion of the First transcontinental railroad. He was one of the four robber barons, along with Mark Hopkins, Collis Huntington and Leland Stanford (also known as The Big Four), who formed the Central Pacific Railroad. Mount Crocker is one of four peaks named after the Big Four that surrounds Pioneer Basin, the others being Mount Hopkins, Mount Huntington, and Mount Stanford.

The first ascent of the summit was made August 25, 1929, by Nazario Sparrea, a Basque shepherd.

== Climate ==
According to the Köppen climate classification system, Mount Crocker is located in an alpine climate zone. Most weather fronts originate in the Pacific Ocean, and travel east toward the Sierra Nevada mountains. As fronts approach, they are forced upward by the peaks (orographic lift), causing them to drop their moisture in the form of rain or snowfall onto the range. Precipitation runoff from the north side of this mountain drains into McGee Creek which empties at Crowley Lake, and from the south aspect to Lake Thomas A Edison via Mono Creek, thence South Fork San Joaquin River.

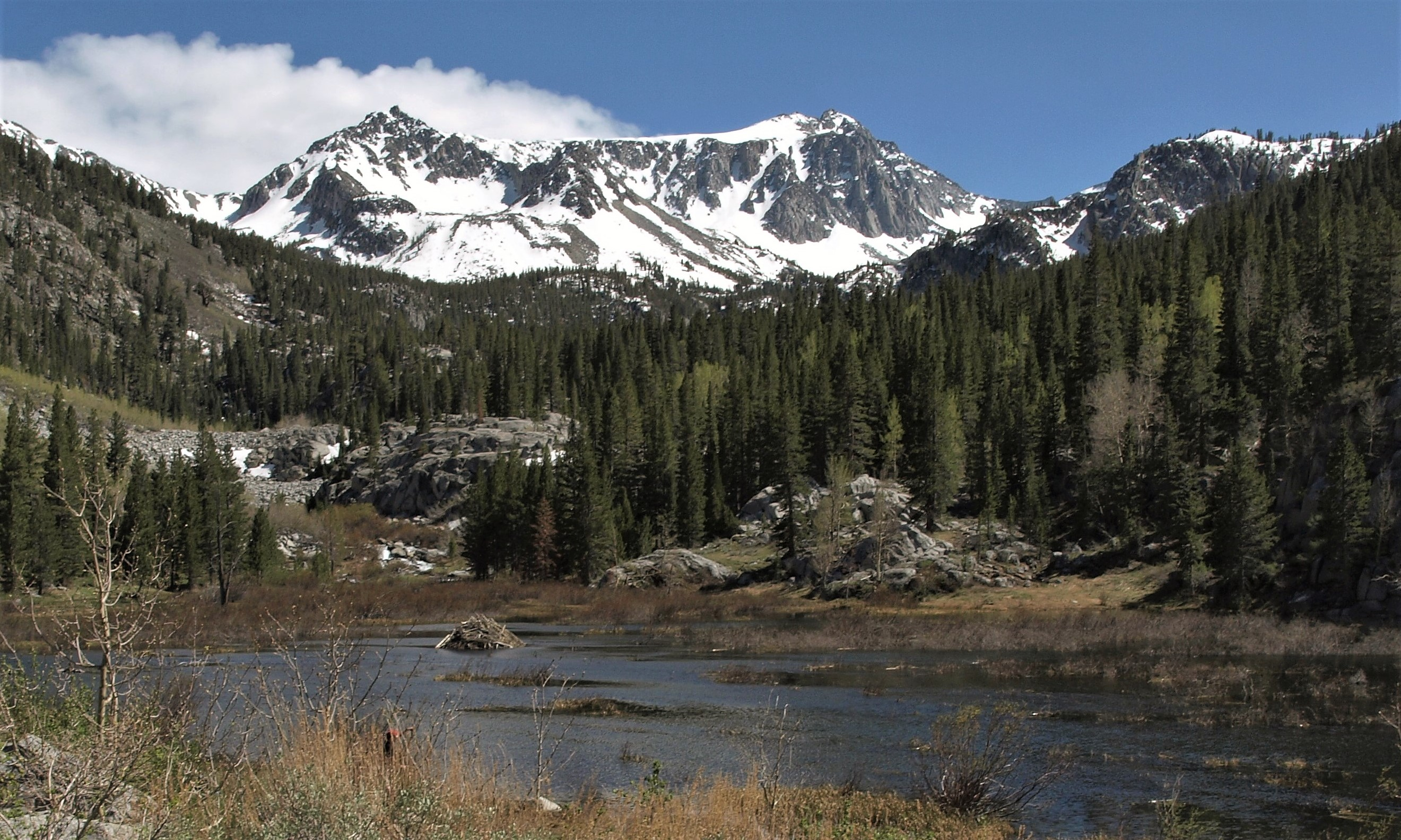
Mt. Crocker from north, McGee Creek drainage

== See also ==
- Sierra Nevada
