= Mount Stanford (Fresno and Mono counties, California) =

Mountain in California, United States

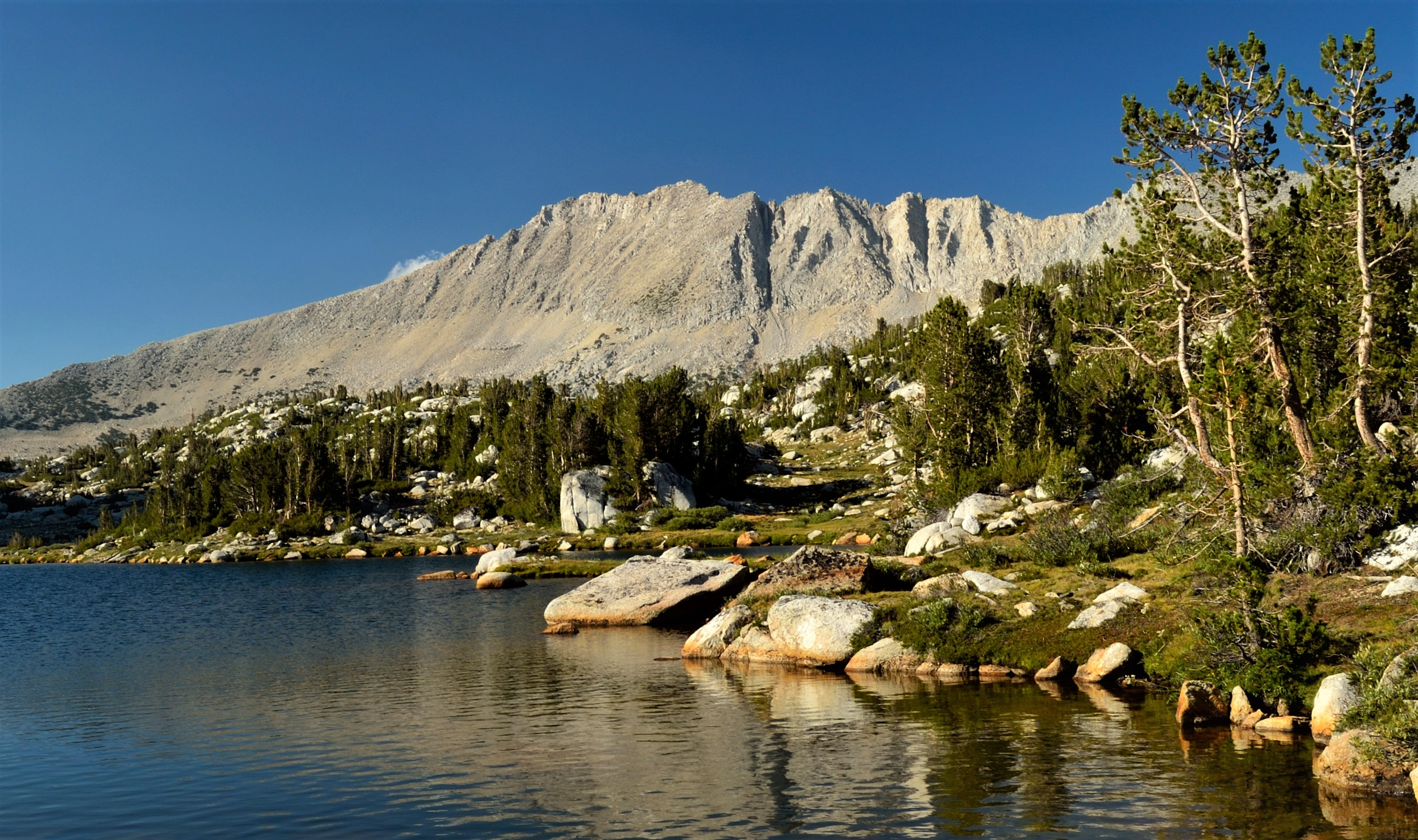
- Southwest aspect

Highest point
- Elevation: 12,838 ft (3,913 m)
- Prominence: 158 ft (48 m)
- Isolation: 1.45 mi (2.33 km)
- Listing: Sierra Peaks Section; Vagmarken Club Sierra Crest List
- Coordinates: 37°29′22″N 118°47′47″W

Naming
- Etymology: Leland Stanford

Geography
- Location within California Location within the United States
- Location: Fresno County / Mono County; California, U.S.
- Parent range: Sierra Nevada
- Topo map: USGS Mount Abbot

Geology
- Rock age: Cretaceous
- Mountain type: Fault block
- Rock type: Granodiorite

Climbing
- First ascent: 1929
- Easiest route: class 2 via Pioneer Basin

Mount Stanford is a 12,838-foot-elevation (3,913-meter) mountain summit located on the crest of the Sierra Nevada mountain range in northern California, United States. It is situated in the John Muir Wilderness, on the boundary shared by Sierra National Forest with Inyo National Forest, and along the common border of Fresno County with Mono County. It is 10 miles northeast of Lake Thomas A Edison, and approximately 15 miles (24 km) southeast of the community of Mammoth Lakes. Topographic relief is significant as the north aspect rises 3,200 feet (980 meters) above McGee Creek in approximately 1.75 miles. There is another Mount Stanford (elevation 13,979 ft) in the Sierra Nevada, which is named for Stanford University.

== History ==
This mountain's toponym was adopted as "Stanford Peak" in 1911 and officially revised to Mount Stanford in 1982 by the U.S. Board on Geographic Names. The name was applied during a 1907–09 survey by Robert Bradford Marshall of the USGS to honor Leland Stanford (1824–1893), the 8th governor of California. Later, he was one of the founders of the Central Pacific Railroad, which constructed the westernmost portion of the First transcontinental railroad. Stanford was one of four principal investors, along with Mark Hopkins, Collis Huntington and Charles Crocker (also known as The Big Four), who formed the Central Pacific Railroad. Mount Stanford is one of four peaks named after the Big Four that surround Pioneer Basin, the others being Mount Hopkins, Mount Huntington, and Mount Crocker.

The first ascent of the summit was made by Robert B. Marshall, George R. Davis, C. F. Urquhart and L. F. Biggs during the 1907–1909 Goddard Quadrangle survey for the USGS.

== Climate ==
According to the Köppen climate classification system, Mount Stanford is located in an alpine climate zone. Most weather fronts originate in the Pacific Ocean and travel east toward the Sierra Nevada mountains. As fronts approach, they are forced upward by the peaks (orographic lift), causing them to drop their moisture in the form of rain or snowfall onto the range. Precipitation runoff from the north side of this mountain drains to Crowley Lake via McGee and Hilton creeks, and from the south aspect to Pioneer Basin Lakes, thence the South Fork San Joaquin River via Mono Creek.

== Gallery ==
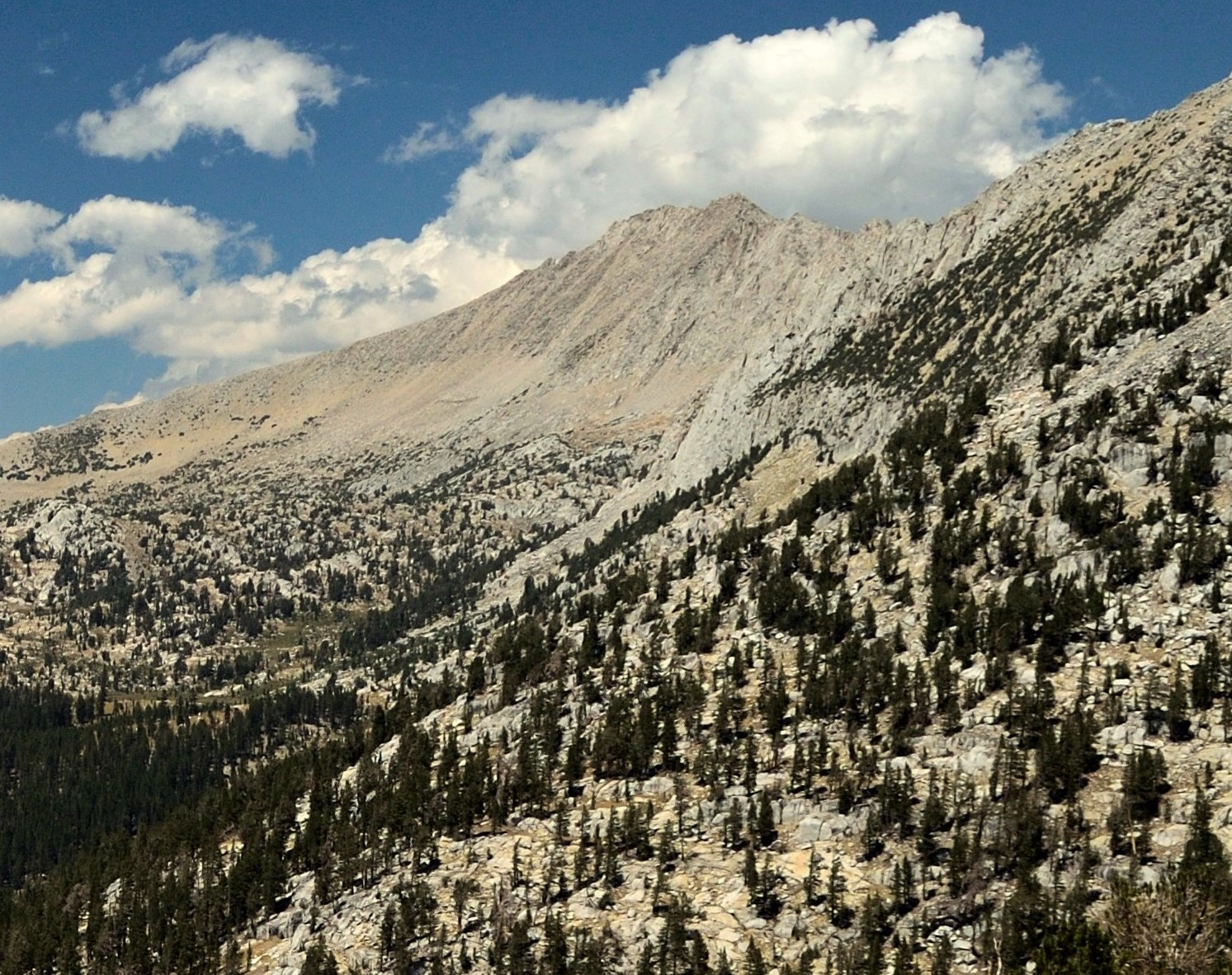
South aspect

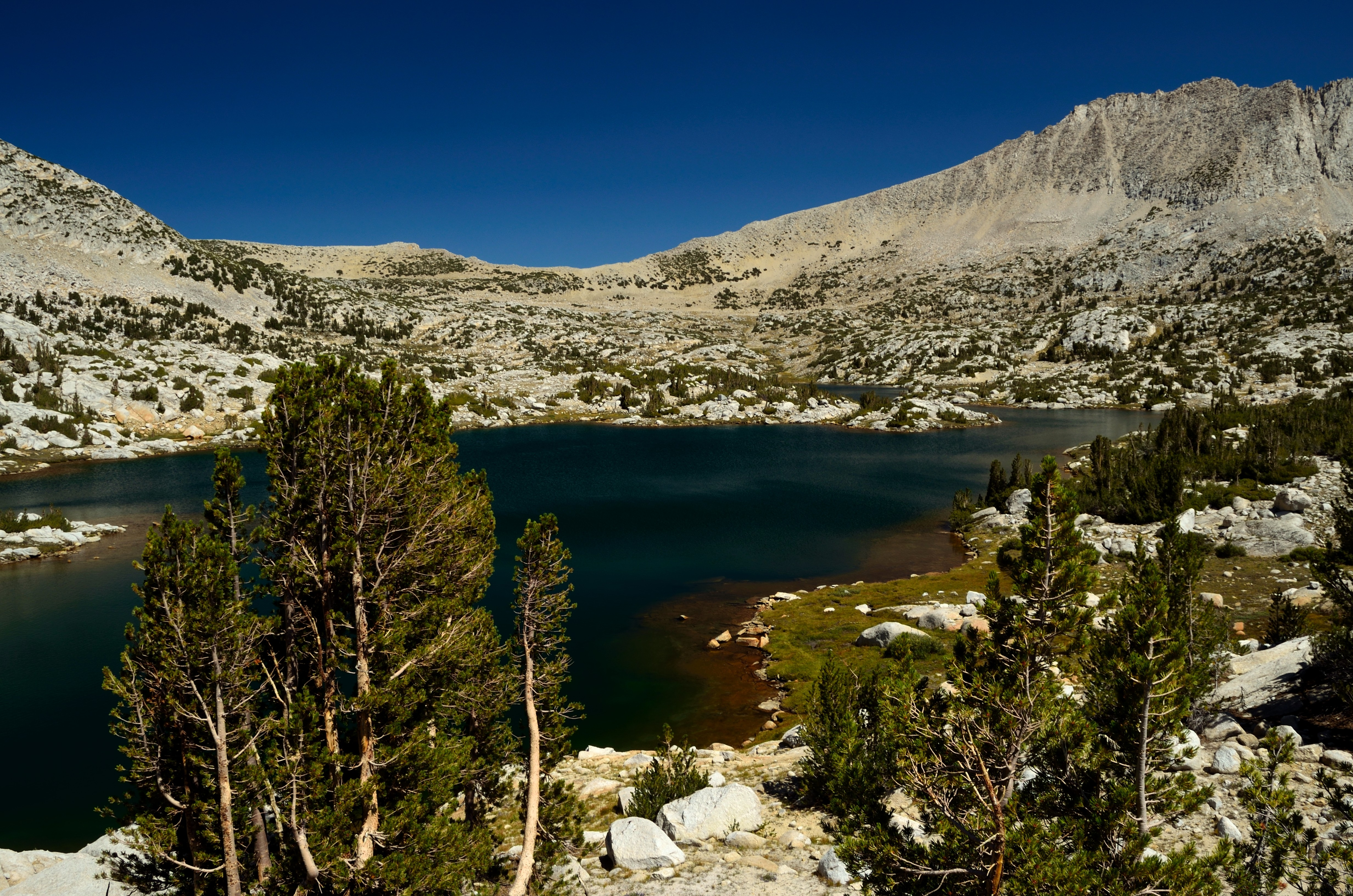
Mt. Stanford (right) seen from Pioneer Basin

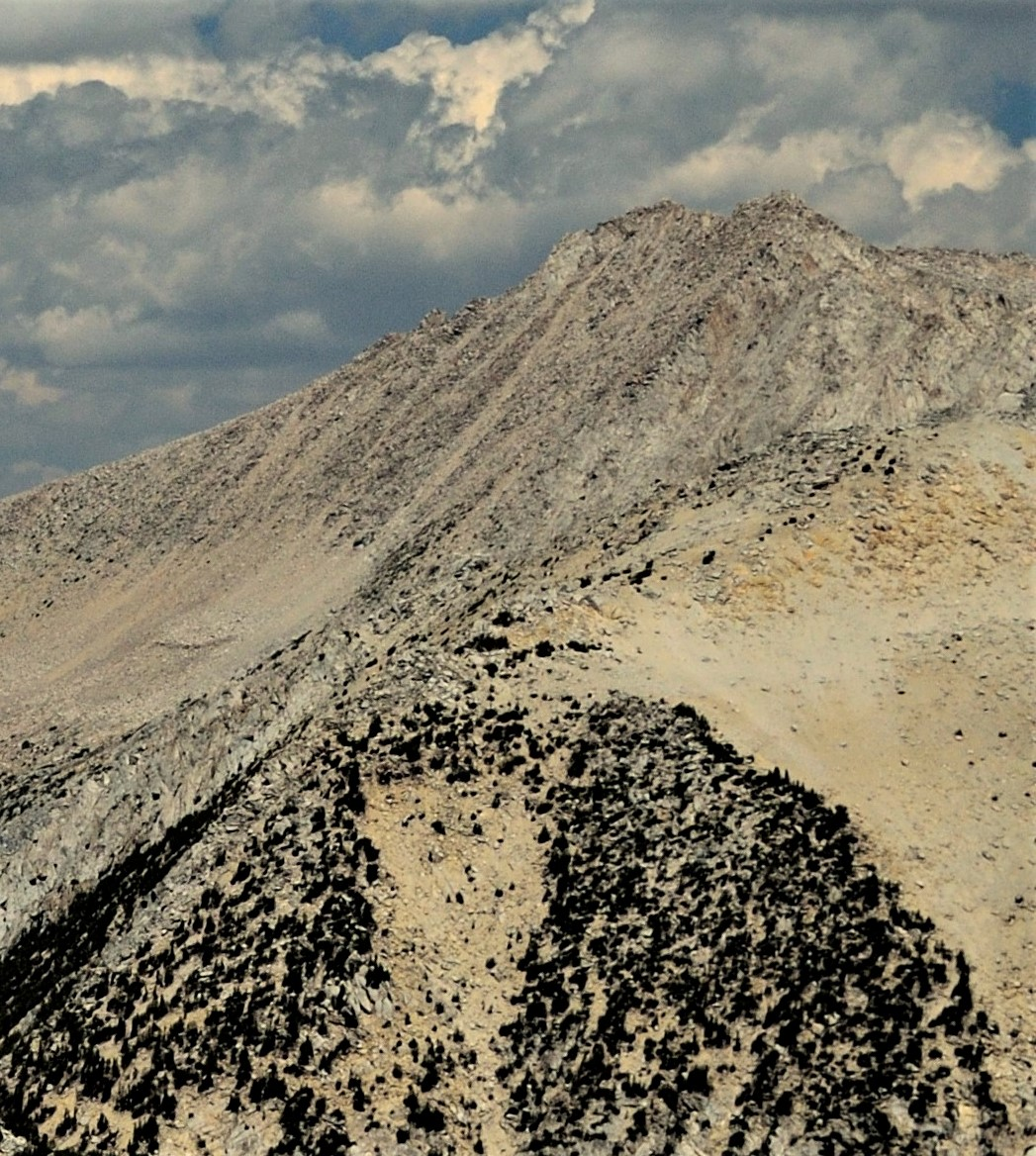
South aspect above Pioneer Basin

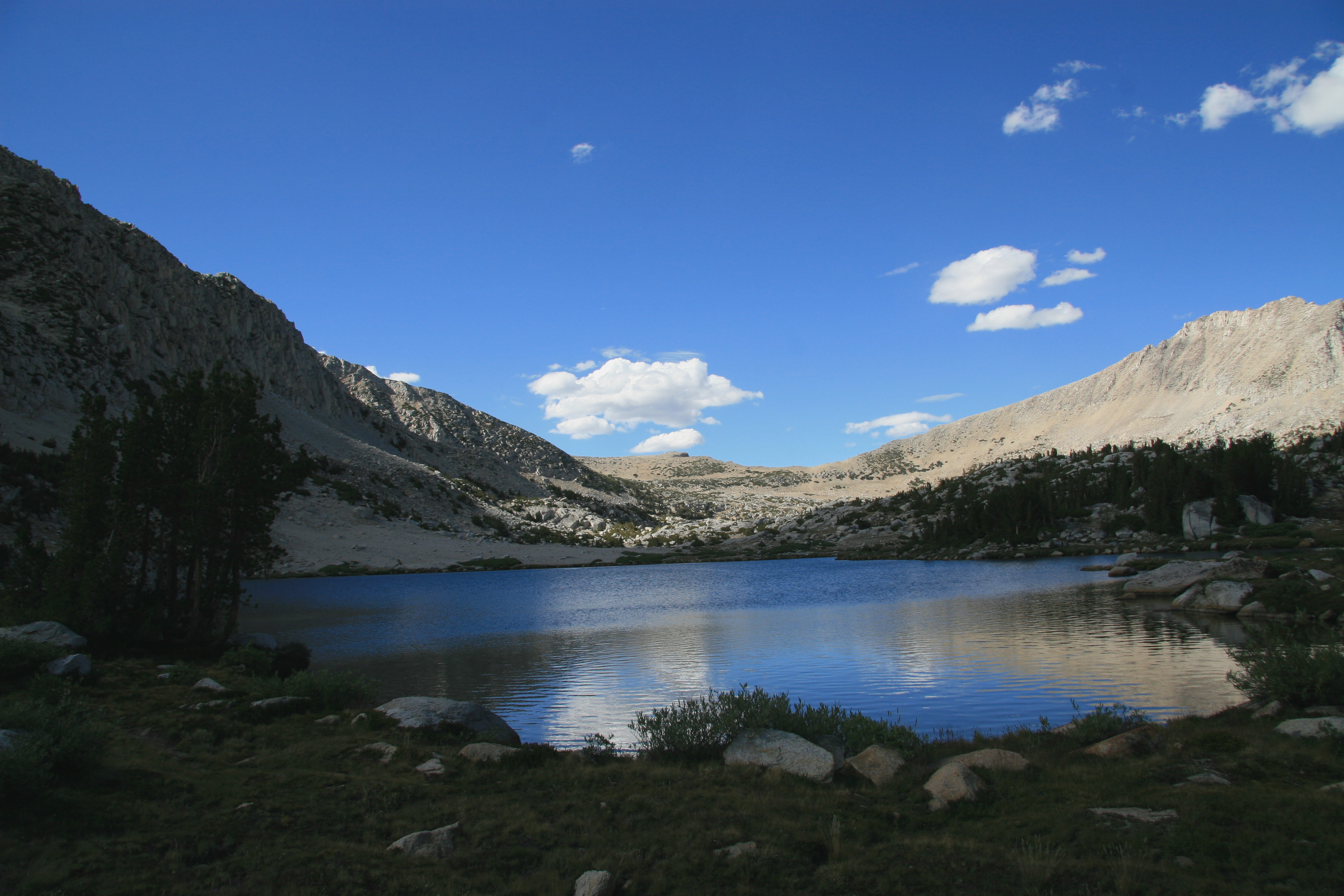
Mt. Stanford (right) seen from Pioneer Basin

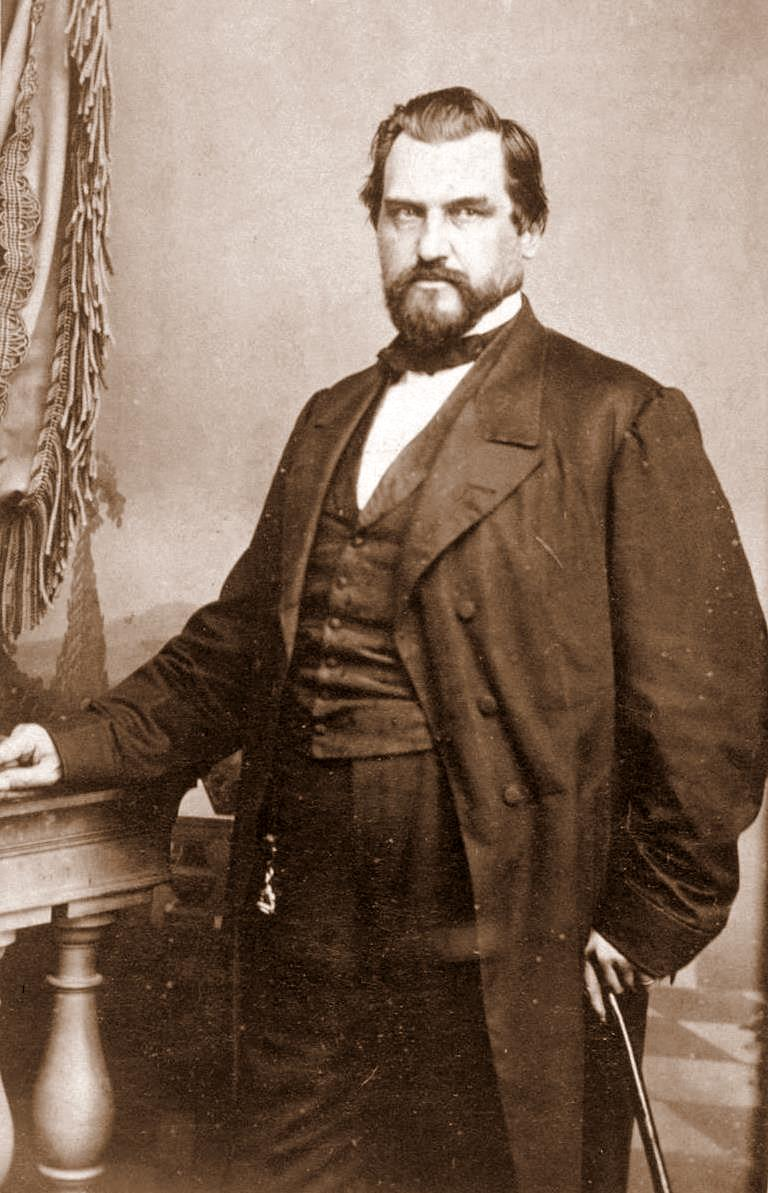
Leland Stanford circa 1870s

== See also ==
- Sierra Nevada
