= Leland Stanford =

Governor of California from 1862 to 1863

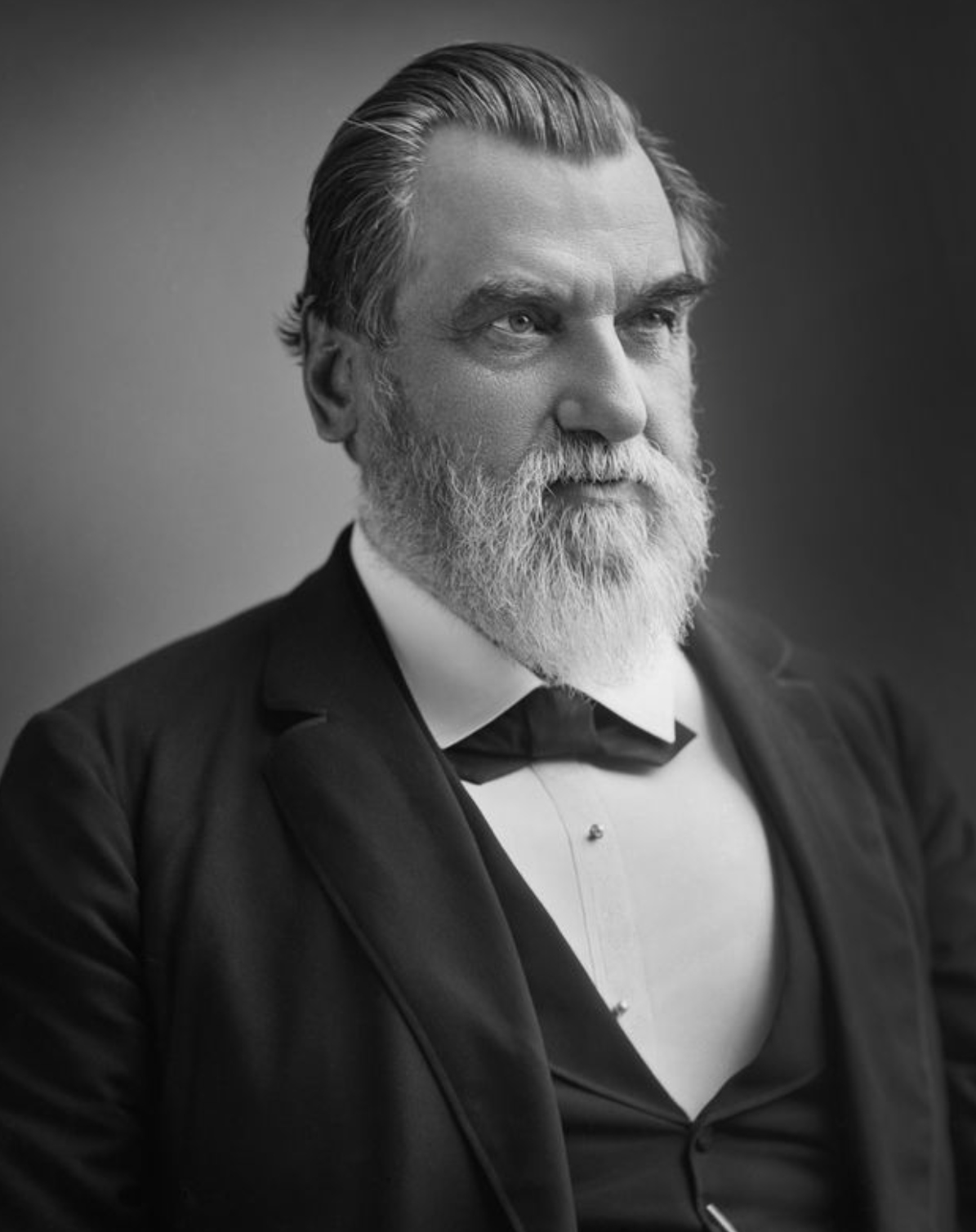
- Stanford in 1890

United States Senator from California
- In office March 4, 1885 – June 21, 1893
- Preceded by: James T. Farley
- Succeeded by: George Clement Perkins

8th Governor of California
- In office January 10, 1862 – December 10, 1863
- Lieutenant: John F. Chellis
- Preceded by: John Gately Downey
- Succeeded by: Frederick Ferdinand Low

Personal details
- Born: Amasa Leland Stanford; March 9, 1824 Watervliet, New York, U.S.
- Died: June 21, 1893 (aged 69) Palo Alto, California, U.S.
- Party: Republican (from 1856)
- Other political affiliations: Whig (until 1856)
- Spouse: Jane Elizabeth Lathrop (m. 1850)
- Children: Leland Jr.
- Education: Cazenovia Seminary
- Occupation: Politician; Businessman

Amasa Leland Stanford (March 9, 1824 – June 21, 1893) was an American attorney, industrialist, philanthropist, and Republican Party politician from Watervliet, New York. He served as the eighth governor of California from 1862 to 1863 and represented the state in the United States Senate from 1885 until his death in 1893. Stanford and his wife Jane founded Stanford University, named after their late son.

Stanford became a successful merchant and wholesaler after migrating to California in 1852 during the gold rush; he built a business empire. Stanford was an influential executive of the Central Pacific Railroad and later of the Southern Pacific railroads from 1861 to 1890; these positions gave him tremendous power in the Western United States which left a lasting impact on California. Stanford also played a significant role as a shareholder and executive in the early history of Pacific Life and Wells Fargo. He was the first Republican governor of California. Stanford is widely considered a robber baron.

== Early life and career ==
Leland Stanford was born on March 9, 1824, in what was then Watervliet, New York (later the Town of Colonie). He was one of eight children of Josiah and Elizabeth Phillips Stanford. Among his siblings were New York State Senator Charles Stanford (1819–1885) and Australian businessman and spiritualist Thomas Welton Stanford (1832–1918). His ancestor, Thomas Stanford, settled in Charlestown, Massachusetts, in the 17th century. Later ancestors settled in the eastern Mohawk Valley of central New York about 1720.

Stanford's father was a farmer of some means. Stanford was raised on family farms in the Lisha Kill and Roessleville (after 1836) areas of Watervliet. The family home in Roessleville was called Elm Grove. The Elm Grove home was razed in the 1940s. Stanford attended the common school until 1836 and was tutored at home until 1839. He attended Clinton Liberal Institute, in Clinton, New York, and studied law at Cazenovia Seminary in Cazenovia, New York, in 1841 to 1845. In 1845, Stanford entered the law office of Wheaton, Doolittle, and Hadley in Albany.

After being admitted to the bar in 1848, Stanford moved with many other settlers to Port Washington, Wisconsin, where he began a law practice with Wesley Pierce. His father presented him with a law library said to be the finest north of Milwaukee. In 1850, Stanford was nominated by the Whig Party as Washington County, Wisconsin, district attorney.

== Businesses ==
In 1852, having lost his law library and other property to a fire, Stanford followed his five brothers to California during the California gold rush. His wife, Jane, returned (temporarily) to Albany and her family. Stanford went into business with his brothers and became the keeper of a general store for miners in Michigan City, California, later the name changed to Michigan Bluff in Placer County; later, he had a wholesale house. Stanford served as a justice of the peace and helped organize the Sacramento Library Association, which later became the Sacramento Public Library. In 1855, he returned to Albany to join his wife, but found the pace too slow after the excitement of developing California.

=== Central Pacific and Southern Pacific railroads ===
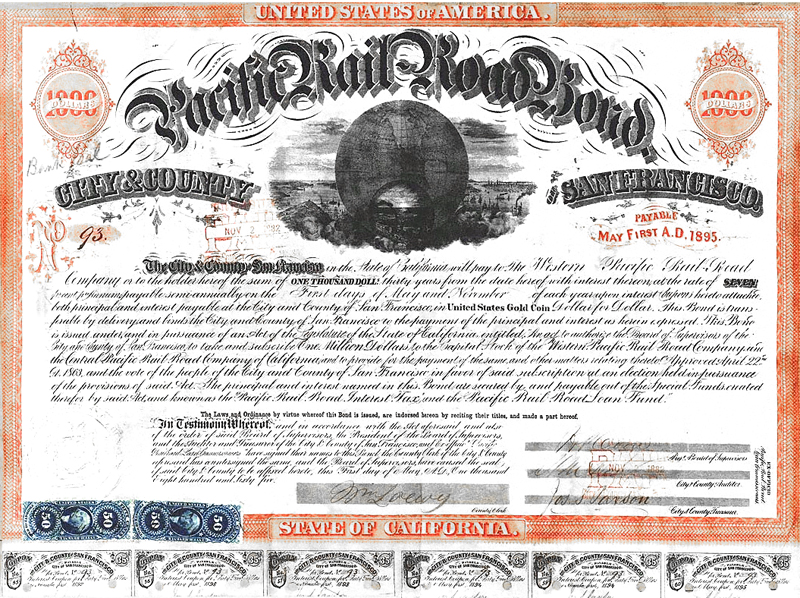
Pacific Railroad Bond, City, and County of San Francisco, 1865

In 1856, Stanford and his wife moved to Sacramento, where he engaged in mercantile pursuits on a large scale. Stanford was one of the four merchants known popularly as "The Big Four" (or among themselves as "the Associates"), who were the key investors in Chief Engineer Theodore Dehone Judah's plan for the Central Pacific Railroad. The five of them incorporated it on June 28, 1861, and Stanford was elected as its president. The other three associates were Charles Crocker, Mark Hopkins, and Collis P. Huntington.

The Central Pacific's first locomotive, named Gov. Stanford in his honor, is preserved on static display at the California State Railroad Museum, in Sacramento.

Stanford ran unsuccessfully for governor of California in 1859. He was nominated again in 1861 and won the election. Due to the Great Flood of 1862, Stanford had to row to his inauguration in a rowboat. He served one term, then limited to two years.

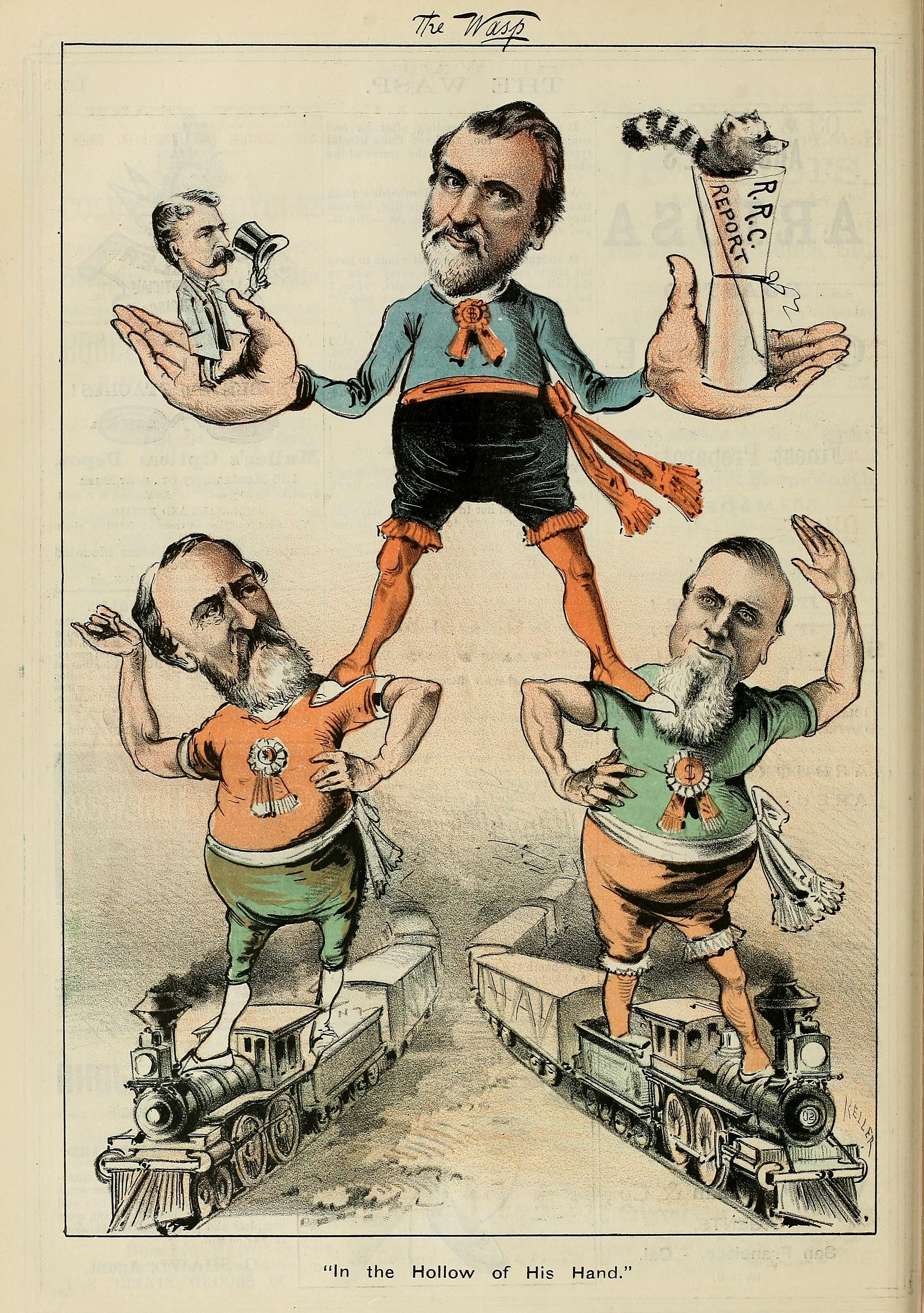
"In the Hollow of His Hand," a political cartoon by George Frederick Keller published in The Wasp depicting California Railroad Commissioners Charles J. Beerstecher and J. S. Cone as puppets of Stanford, February 19, 1881

While the Central Pacific was under construction, Stanford and his associates in 1868 acquired control of the Southern Pacific Railroad. Stanford was elected president of the Southern Pacific, a post he held until 1890 (except for a brief period in 1869–1870 when Tevis was acting president) when Stanford was ousted by Collis Huntington.

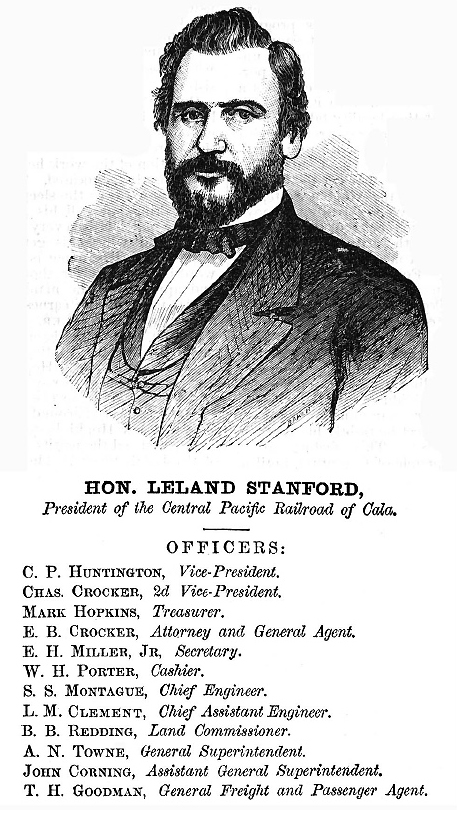
Leland Stanford and the officers of the CPRR in 1870

As head of the railroad company that built the western portion of the "First Transcontinental Railroad" from Sacramento eastward over the Sierra Nevada mountains in California to Nevada and Utah, Stanford presided at the ceremonial driving of "Last Spike" in Promontory, Utah, on May 10, 1869. The grade of the CPRR met that of the Union Pacific Railroad, which had been built westward from its eastern terminus at Council Bluffs, Iowa/Omaha, Nebraska. He was even given the honor of driving the final spike.

Stanford moved with his family from Sacramento to San Francisco in 1874, where he assumed presidency of the Occidental and Oriental Steamship Company, the steamship line to Japan and China associated with the Central Pacific.

The Southern Pacific Company was organized in 1884 as a holding company for the Central Pacific-Southern Pacific system. Stanford was president of the Southern Pacific Company from 1885 until 1890 when he was forced out of that post (as well as the presidency of the Southern Pacific Railroad) by Collis Huntington, the company's ranking vice president and the corporate directorate. That was thought to be retaliation for Stanford's election to the US Senate in 1885 over Huntington's friend, Aaron A. Sargent.

Stanford was elected chairman of the Southern Pacific Railroad's executive committee in 1890, and he held this post and the presidency of the Central Pacific Railroad until his death.

=== Other interests ===
Portrait by Carleton E. Watkins, 1874

In May 1868, Stanford joined Lloyd Tevis, Darius Ogden Mills, H.D. Bacon, Hopkins, and Crocker in forming the Pacific Union Express Company. It merged in 1870 with Wells Fargo and Company. Stanford was a director of Wells Fargo and Company from 1870 to January 1884. After a brief retirement from the board, he served again from February 1884 to his death in June 1893. Also in May 1868, Stanford started the Pacific Mutual Life Insurance Company (now Pacific Life) and served as its first president from 1868 to 1876.

Stanford owned two wineries, the Leland Stanford Winery in Alameda County founded in 1869, and run and later inherited by his brother Josiah, and the 55,000 acres (223 km^{2}) Great Vina Ranch in Tehama County, containing what was then the largest vineyard in the world at 3,575 acres (14 km^{2}) and given to Stanford University.

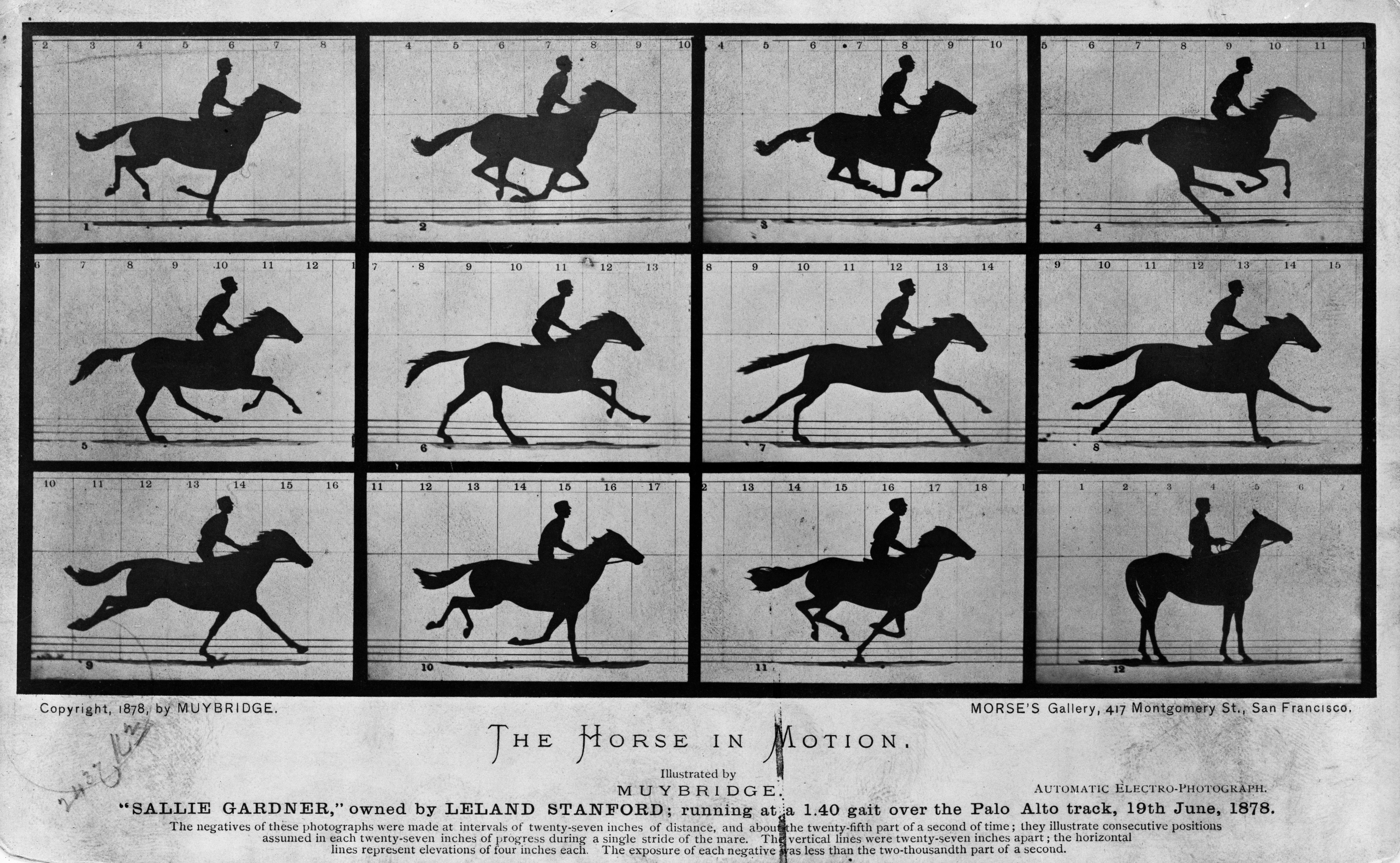
Muybridge's The Horse in Motion, 1878

Stanford was also interested in horses and owned the Gridley tract of 17,800 acres (72 km^{2}) in Butte County. In Santa Clara County, he founded his Palo Alto Stock Farm. Stanford bred Standardbred horses to be raced as trotters, including his chief sire, Electioneer (sired by Hambletonian) and his winning offspring: Arion, Sunol, Palo Alto, and Chimes (out of Stanford's best known dam Beautiful Bells); and Thoroughbreds for flat racing. In 1872, Stanford commissioned the photographer Eadweard Muybridge to undertake scientific studies of the gaits of horses at a trot and gallop at the Agricultural Park racetrack in Sacramento. Images of the horses' movements were captured there, later moving to his Palo Alto Stock Farm. Stanford wanted to determine if the horses ever had all four hooves off the ground at the same time. The result was the proto-film Sallie Gardner at a Gallop (1878). As the Palo Alto breeding farm was later developed into the Stanford University, the university was nicknamed "The Farm."

== Politics ==
Stanford was politically active and became a leading member of the Republican Party. In 1856, he met with other Whig politicians in Sacramento on April 30 to organize the California Republican Party at its first state convention. Stanford was chosen as a delegate to the Republican Party convention that selected US presidential electors in both 1856 and 1860. He was defeated in his 1857 bid for California state treasurer, and his 1859 bid for the office of governor of California. In 1860, Stanford was named a delegate to the Republican National Convention in Chicago, but did not attend. He was elected governor in a second campaign in 1861.

=== Governor of California ===
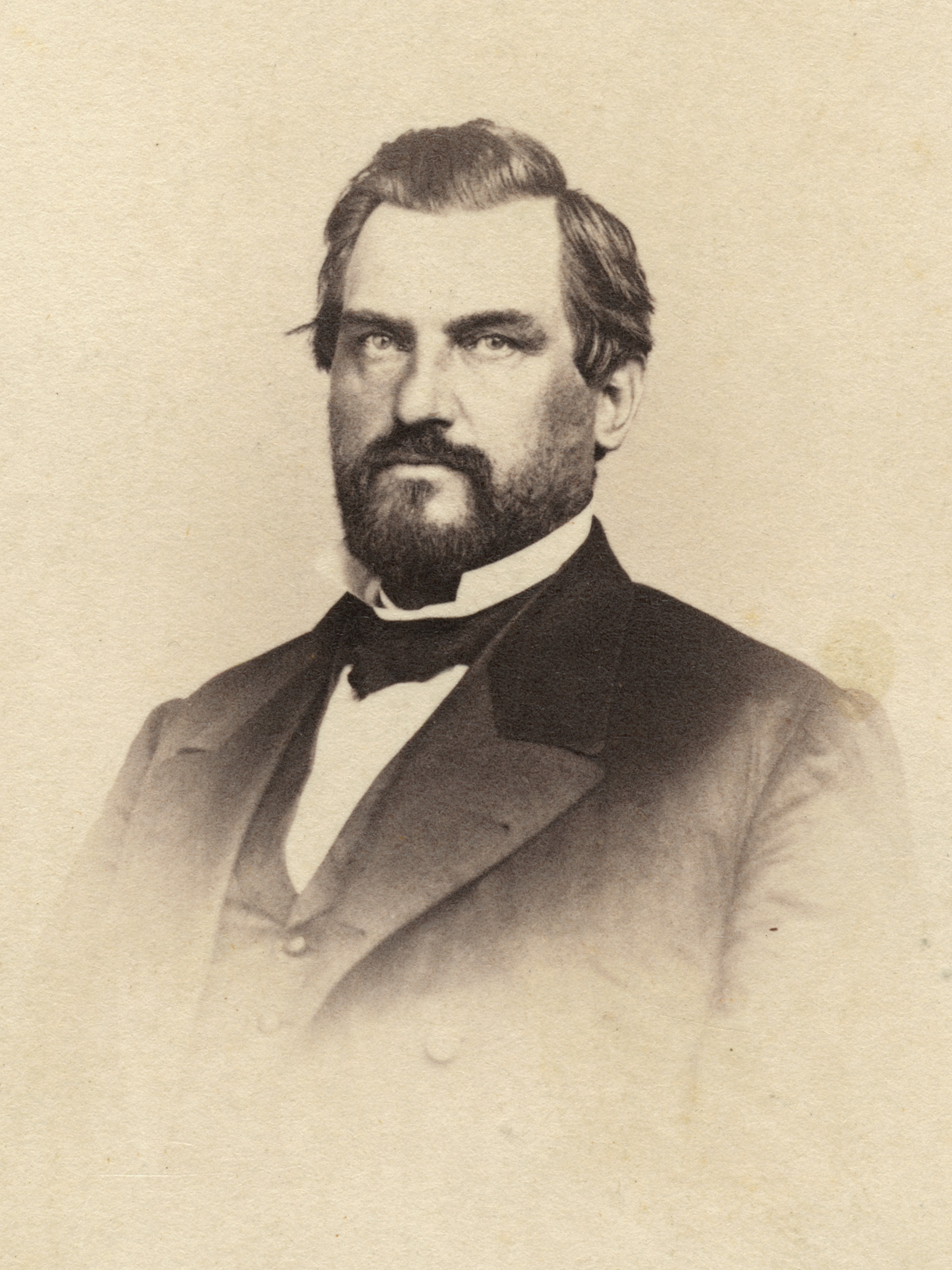
Stanford c. 1860s

Stanford was elected the eighth governor of California, serving from January 1862 to December 1863, and the first Republican governor. Due to the Great Flood of 1862, the governor was said to have needed to row in a boat to his own inauguration. A large, slow-speaking man who always read from a prepared text, he impressed his listeners as being more sincere than a glib, extemporaneous speaker.

During his gubernatorial tenure, Stanford cut the state's debt in half and advocated for the conservation of forests. He also oversaw the establishment of California's first state normal school in San Jose, later to become San Jose State University. Following Stanford's governorship, the term of office changed from two years to four years, in line with legislation passed during his time in office.

==== Native Americans ====
The ongoing eradication of the Native Americans living in California continued under Stanford's administration. He did sign into law an act reversing part of the 1850 Act for the Government and Protection of Indians that allowed the enslavement of Native Americans. However, Stanford also continued the prosecution of the Bald Hills War in Northern California.

==== Chinese immigrants ====
The gold strike in California had brought a large influx of newcomers into the territory, including Chinese immigrants, who faced persecution. Anti-Chinese sentiment became a political issue over time. In a message to the legislature in January 1862, Governor Stanford said:

To my mind it is clear, that the settlement among us of an inferior race is to be discouraged by every legitimate means. Asia, with her numberless millions, sends to our shores the dregs of her population. Large numbers of this class are already here; and, unless we do something early to check their immigration, the question, which of the two tides of immigration, meeting upon the shores of the Pacific, shall be turned back, will be forced upon our consideration, when far more difficult than now of disposal. There can be no doubt but that the presence among us of numbers of degraded and distinct people must exercise a deleterious influence upon the superior race, and to a certain extent, repel desirable immigration.

Stanford was initially acclaimed for such statements, but lost support when it was revealed that his Central Pacific Railroad was also importing Chinese workers to construct the railroad.

=== United States Senator ===
"His Little Game," a caricature of Stanford published in The Wasp following his election to the U.S. Senate, February 7, 1885

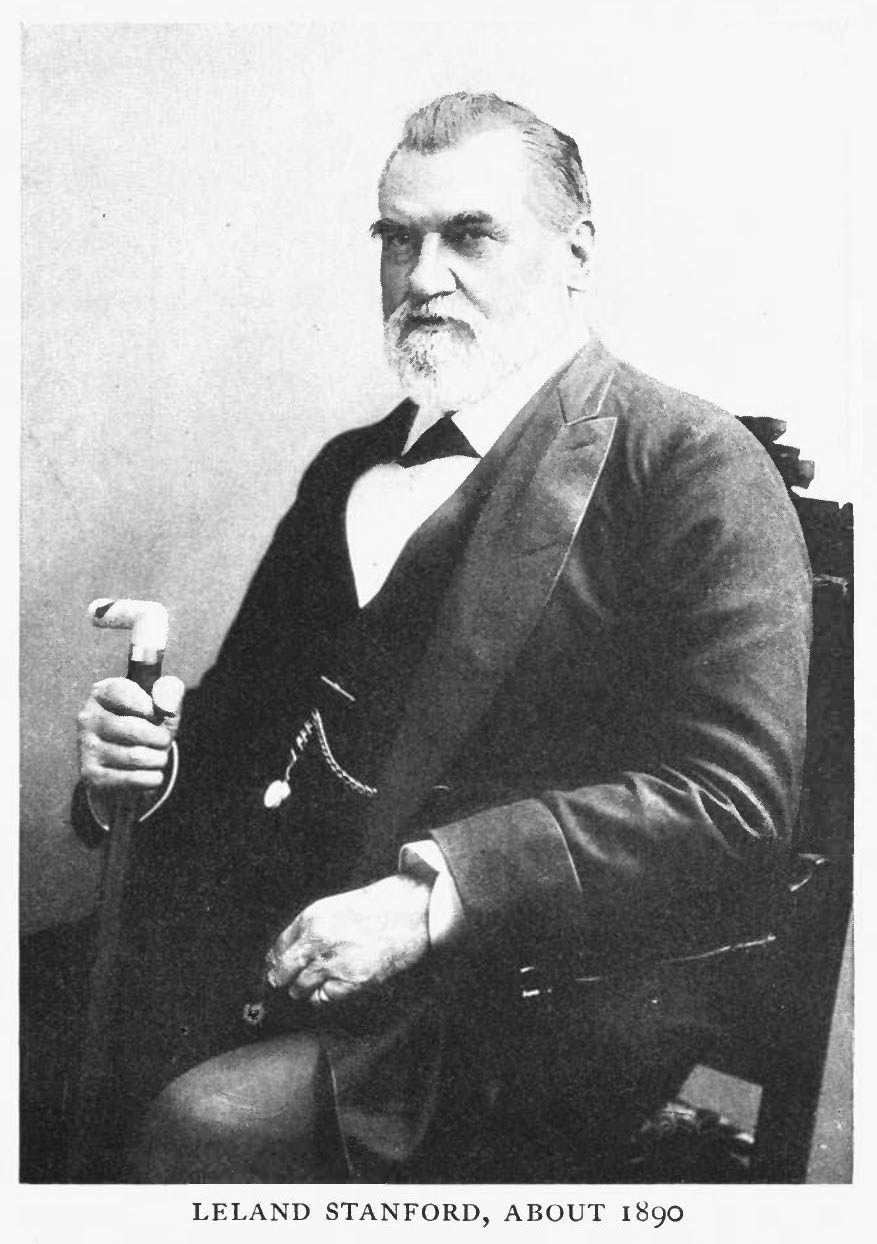
Stanford in 1890

Later, Stanford served in the United States Senate from 1885 until his death in 1893. Stanford served for four years as chairman of the U.S. Senate Committee on Public Buildings and Grounds and on the Naval Committee. He was president and director of the Central Pacific Railroad the entire time he sat in the Senate. Stanford authored several Senate bills that advanced ideas advocated by the People's Party: a bill to foster the creation of worker-owned cooperatives, and a bill to allow the issuance of currency backed by land value instead of only the gold standard. Neither bill made it out of committee. In Washington, D.C., he had a residence on Farragut Square near the home of Baron Karl von Struve, Russian minister to the United States.

== Stanford University ==
With his wife Jane, Stanford founded Leland Stanford Junior University as a memorial for their only child, Leland Stanford Jr., who died at age 15 of typhoid fever in Florence, Italy, in 1884 while on a trip to Europe. The university was established by the Endowment Act of the California Assembly and Senate of March 9, 1885, and the Grant of Endowment from Leland and Jane Stanford signed at the first meeting of the board of trustees on November 14, 1885.

The Stanfords donated approximately $40 million (equivalent to approximately $1,433,000,000 today) to develop the university, which held its opening exercises on October 1, 1891, and was intended for agricultural studies. Its first student, admitted to Encina Hall that day, was Herbert Hoover, who went on to become the 31st US president. The wealth of the Stanford family during the late 19th century is estimated at $50 million (equivalent to approximately $1,935,000,000 today).

Stanford had ideas of Stanford University employee ownership for more than 30 years before giving them expression in his plans for the university, proposals as a senator, and in interviews with the news media.

== Personal life and death ==
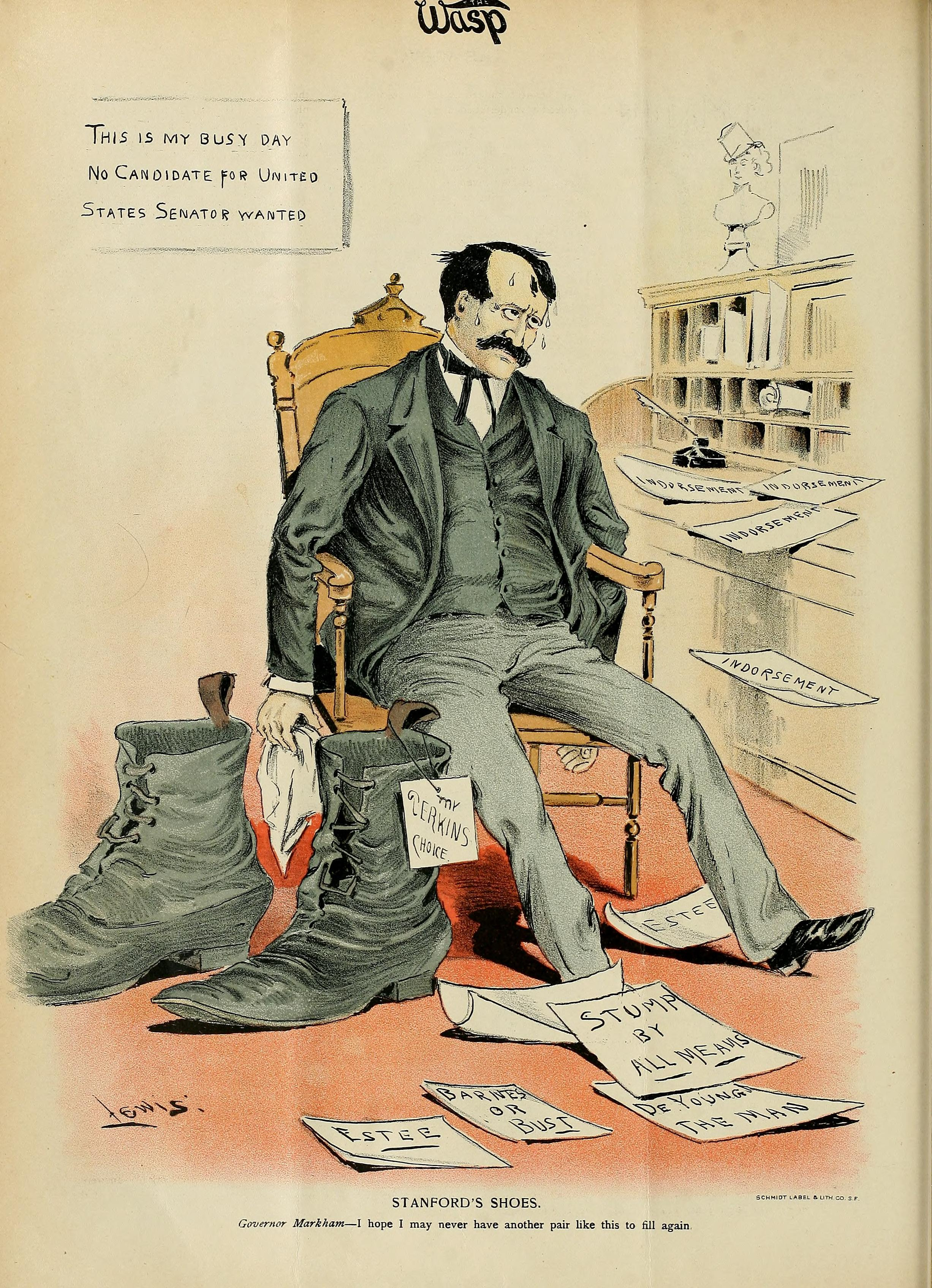
Stanford left big shoes to fill according to this caricature of Governor Henry Markham (charged with appointing his successor) published in The Wasp, July 29, 1893.

On September 30, 1850, Stanford married Jane Elizabeth Lathrop in Albany, New York. She was the daughter of Dyer Lathrop, a merchant of that city, and Jane Anne (Shields) Lathrop. The couple did not have any children for 18 years, until their only child, a son, Leland DeWitt Stanford, was born in 1868 when his father was 44.

Stanford was an active Freemason from 1850 to 1855, joining the Prometheus Lodge No. 17 in Port Washington, Wisconsin. After moving west, he became a member of the Michigan City Lodge No. 47 in Michigan Bluff, California. Stanford was also a member of the Independent Order of Odd Fellows in California.

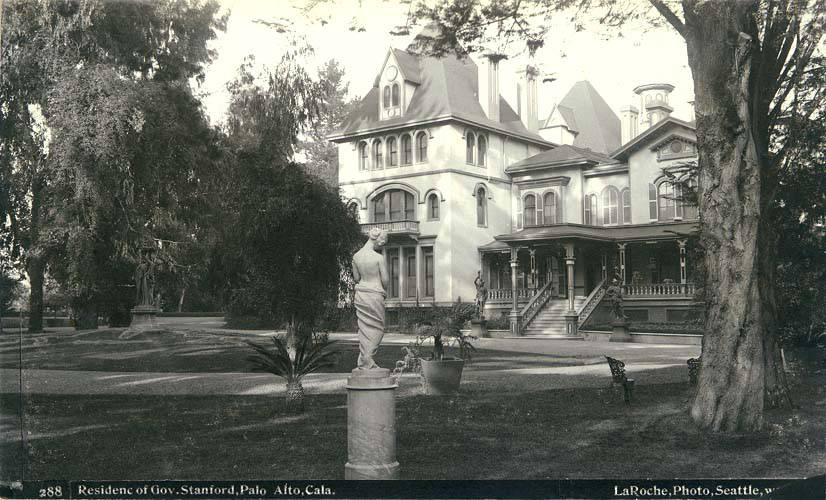
The Stanford residence in Palo Alto, 1888

The Stanfords retained ownership of their mansion in Sacramento, where their only son was born in 1868. Now the Leland Stanford Mansion State Historic Park, the house museum is also used for California state social occasions. The Stanfords' home in San Francisco's Nob Hill district was destroyed in the 1906 San Francisco earthquake; the site is now occupied by the Stanford Court Hotel. The Stanford residence at the Palo Alto Stock Farm became a convalescent home for children in 1919 (the forerunner of the Lucille Packard Children's Hospital) and was torn down in 1965.

Long-suffering from locomotor ataxia, Stanford died of heart failure at home in Palo Alto, California, on June 21, 1893; he was 69 years old. Stanford was buried in the family mausoleum on the Stanford campus. Jane Stanford died in 1905 after being poisoned with strychnine.

== Legacy and honors ==
In 1862, California volunteer troops re-building a military post at the confluence of the San Pedro River and Aravaipa Creek in Arizona Territory named the post Fort Stanford after the governor. However, the post later reverted to its former name, Fort Breckenridge, and in 1866 became Camp Grant. In 2008, Stanford was inducted into The California Museum for History, Women and the Arts, California Hall of Fame. A relative, Tom Stanford, accepted the honors on his behalf.

The Stanford Memorial Church on the university campus is dedicated to Stanford's memory. Mount Stanford in California's John Muir Wilderness is named for Stanford. This mountain, found in Pioneer Basin, is located near other mountains named for "Big Four", including Mount Huntington, Mount Hopkins, and Mount Crocker. Central Pacific locomotives named for Stanford were:

- Gov. Stanford, a 4-4-0 locomotive built in 1863 by the Norris Locomotive Works in Philadelphia and brought to San Francisco by sailing vessel. This engine is preserved at the California State Railroad Museum in Sacramento
- El Gobernador, a 4-10-0 locomotive built in the Central Pacific shops in Sacramento in 1884. Found to be disappointing in its performance as a freight hauler, it was scrapped in July 1894.

== See also ==
- List of members of the United States Congress who died in office (1790–1899)
- List of governors of California

== Sources ==
- Wilson, J. G.; Fiske, J., eds. (1900). "Stanford, Leland" . Appletons' Cyclopædia of American Biography. New York: D. Appleton.
- White, Richard (2011). Railroaded: The Transcontinentals and the Making of Modern America. W. W. Norton & Company. ISBN 978-0-393-06126-0.

Party political offices
Preceded by Edward Stanly	Republican nominee for Governor of California; 1859, 1861	Succeeded by Frederick Low
Political offices
Preceded by John G. Downey	Governor of California; January 10, 1862 – December 10, 1863	Succeeded by Frederick Low
U.S. Senate
Preceded by James T. Farley	U.S. senator (Class 3) from California; March 4, 1885 – June 21, 1893; Served alongside: John F. Miller, George Hearst, Charles N. Felton, Stephen M. White	Succeeded by George C. Perkins
Business positions
Preceded by None	Executive Committee Chairmen; Southern Pacific Railroad; 1890–1893	Succeeded by Robert S. Lovett
