= Leland Stanford Winery =

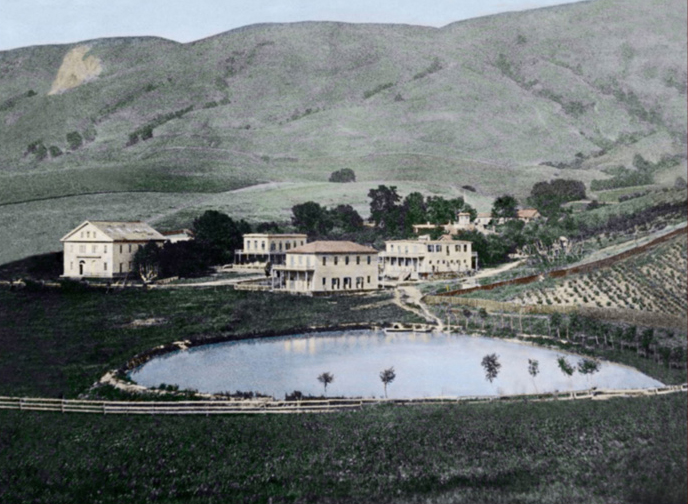
- Leland Stanford Winery circa 1893
- Location: 330 Stanford Ave., Fremont, California
- Coordinates: 37.503411°N 121.912311°W
- Built: 1869

California Historical Landmark
- Designated: 1958
- Reference no.: 642

Leland Stanford Winery was a winery located in the Santa Clara Valley AVA, in Fremont, California, United States. The winery was founded by Leland Stanford in 1869. The vineyard was planted by Stanford's brother, Josiah Stanford. The winery was owned by Weibel Champagne Vineyards until 1996. The area has since been developed into housing, and now consists of a single unused brick building. It was the third vineyard owned by Leland Stanford. It is a California Historical Landmark.

== History ==
The location of the Leland Stanford Winery was on the former Rancho Agua Caliente, an 1836 Mexican land grant in Alta California. The name means "warm water" and refers to the warm springs located in the foothills.

In 1850, Clement Columbet bought a large parcel, and opened the Warm Springs Hotel, a resort for wealthy San Francisco Bay Area residents during the 1850s through 1860s. It was destroyed in the 1868 Hayward earthquake.

In 1869 Leland Stanford purchased its site and 100 acres, and founded a winery. Stanford's brother, Josiah Stanford, served as vineyard manager. He planted the vines and managed the winery. In 1893, Josiah Stanford inherited the winery from his brother. By 1898 the property was 1,225 acres.

Despite success, the vineyard was victim to phylloxera. It also experienced two major earthquakes, including the 1906 San Francisco earthquake.

The winery was purchased and renamed Weibel Champagne Vineyards in 1945.

== Wine production ==
By 1893, Leland Stanford Winery was producing 320,000 gallons of wine. They were the first winery in California to make sparkling wine.

== Other products ==
The property also had an orchard and produced hay and beef. They also had lemon trees.
