= Rancho Los Tularcitos =

Mexican land grant in California

- Mexican land grant
- Location of Santa Clara County, Californiay
- Coordinates: 37°27′36″N 121°54′0″W
- Country: United States
- State: California
- Settled: 1821

Area
  - Total: 4,394 acres (1,778 ha)

Rancho Los Tularcitos was a 4,394-acre (17.78 km^{2}) Spanish land concession in present day Santa Clara County, California given in 1821 to José Loreto Higuera by the last Spanish governor of Alta California, Pablo Vicente de Solá. The land grant was confirmed by Mexican Governor Juan Alvarado in 1839. The name means "place of the little Tule thickets". The rancho, in what is today central and northern Milpitas, extended from the confluence of Calera and Penitencia Creeks in the northwest to a large live oak tree that marked its southeastern corner. South of Rancho Los Tularcitos was the land of the Pueblo of San José.

== History ==
Ygnacio Anastacio Higuera (1753–1805) came to California with the De Anza Expedition of 1776. Along the way, Ygnacio Higuera married Maria Micaela Bojorquez (1762–1794). Ygnacio Higuera was a soldier at the Presidio of San Francisco. He moved to the Pueblo of San José, and was killed in 1805. Ygnacio's son, Jose Loreto Higuera (1778–1845), married Maria Pilar Sanchez (1778–1811) in 1794. After she died, José Higuera married Ramona Bernal (1794–1831) in 1813.

Between 1817 and 1822, Spanish Governor Sola made several land grants, and José Loreto Higuera was awarded Rancho Los Tularcitos in 1821. José Higuera married Ramona Garcia (1812 - ) in 1832. In 1836 José Loreto Higuera's son, Fulgencio Higuera, was the grantee of Rancho Agua Caliente. In 1843, his son Valentin Higuera was the grantee of Rancho Pescadero. The Rancho Los Tularcitos land grant to Jose Higuera was confirmed by Mexican Governor Alvarado in 1839.

With the cession of California to the United States following the Mexican-American War, the 1848 Treaty of Guadalupe Hidalgo provided that the land grants would be honored. As required by the Land Act of 1851, a claim for Rancho Los Tularcitos was filed with the Public Land Commission in 1852, and the grant patented to Antonia Higuera et al., the heirs of Jose Higuera in 1870.

The beginning of the break-up of the rancho is said to have begun with the land given to José Loreto Higuera's grand daughter, daughter of Valentin Higuera, Maria Margarita Higuera, when she married Nicolas Chavarria. Henry Curtner purchased Rancho Tularcitos in 1868.

== Historic sites of the Rancho ==
- José Higuera Adobe. Soon after being given the land, José Higuera built a one story adobe for what would be, his fourteen children from three marriages.
