= Rancho Del Paso =

Mexican land grant in California

Coordinates: 38.650°N 121.410°W

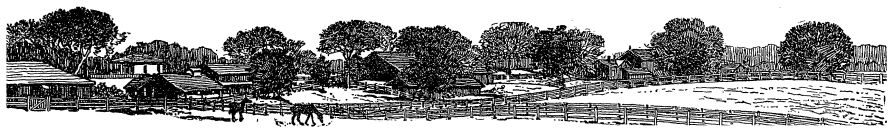
Rancho Del Paso, c. 1905

Rancho Del Paso was a 44,371-acre (179.56 km^{2}) Mexican land grant in present-day Sacramento County, California, In 1844 by Governor Manuel Micheltorena, Captain John Sutter’s old friend, gave 44,000 acres to Eliab Grimes. Grimes called it the Rancho del Paso because it was on the road to the pass of the American River through the Sierra. . The grant extended along the north bank of the American River and was bounded roughly by today’s Northgate Boulevard, Manzanita Avenue, and Elkhorn Boulevard. The grant encompassed present-day North Sacramento, Del Paso Heights, Rio Linda, Arden-Arcade, and a portion of Carmichael.

== History ==
John Sutter gave the land north of the American River to Eliab Grimes, Hiram Grimes, and John Sinclair. Captain Eliab Grimes (1780–1848), a native of Massachusetts, was a Honolulu merchant of many years and operated with his nephew, Hiram, as the firm E & H Grimes. Hiram Grimes would later own Rancho San Juan and Rancho Pescadero. Eliab Grimes persuaded Sinclair to occupy the Rancho Del Paso, until such time as he (Grimes) could take legal title to it. In 1843, John Sinclair, who had gone to work for Sutter in 1840, and his wife Mary Sinclair occupied the Rancho. In 1844, Eliab Grimes received the official ten square league land grant. Over the next four years, Grimes and Sinclair raised cattle and harvested wheat on the property.

Grimes, who subsequently became an important trader and political figure in San Francisco, died in 1848, leaving his share of the rancho to his nephew, Hiram Grimes. Three months later, in 1849, John Sinclair sold his share of the property to Hiram Grimes. Hiram Grimes later owned Rancho San Juan and Rancho Pescadero. In 1852, Grimes sold the entire Rancho Del Paso to San Francisco trader Samuel Norris. Originally named Gotthilf Wilhelm Becher Christensen, Norris was an immigrant from Denmark who came to California in 1839 and renamed himself.

With the cession of California to the United States following the Mexican-American War, the 1848 Treaty of Guadalupe Hidalgo provided that the land grants would be honored. As required by the Land Act of 1851, a claim for Rancho Del Paso was filed with the Public Land Commission in 1852, and the grant was patented to Samuel Norris in 1858.

During the 1850s, Norris remained embroiled in a legal battle with the descendants of Eliab Grimes, who contested Eliab Grimes' will, and hence Norris' claim to the rancho. In 1860, the United States Supreme Court sided with Norris.

Norris emerged deep in debt to his lawyers James Ben Ali Haggin (1822–1914) and Lloyd Tevis (1824–1899); and in 1862, Norris sold Rancho del Paso to them. Norris later unsuccessfully sued Haggin and Tevis, claiming fraud.

== The Haggin Years ==
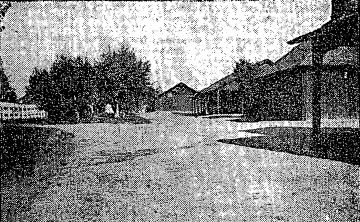
Rancho Del Paso stallion barn, c. 1905

Rancho Del Paso became nationally prominent during the 1880s for its extensive horse breeding facilities. Haggin stopped using the ranch as a horse breeding operation in 1905, and concentrated his breeding efforts at his Elmendorf Farm in Lexington, Kentucky.

With the rapid growth of the Sacramento Valley, the Rancho Del Paso Land Company was incorporated in 1891, and sold to the Sacramento Valley Colonization Company in 1910.
