= Mount Stanford =

Mountain in the American state of California

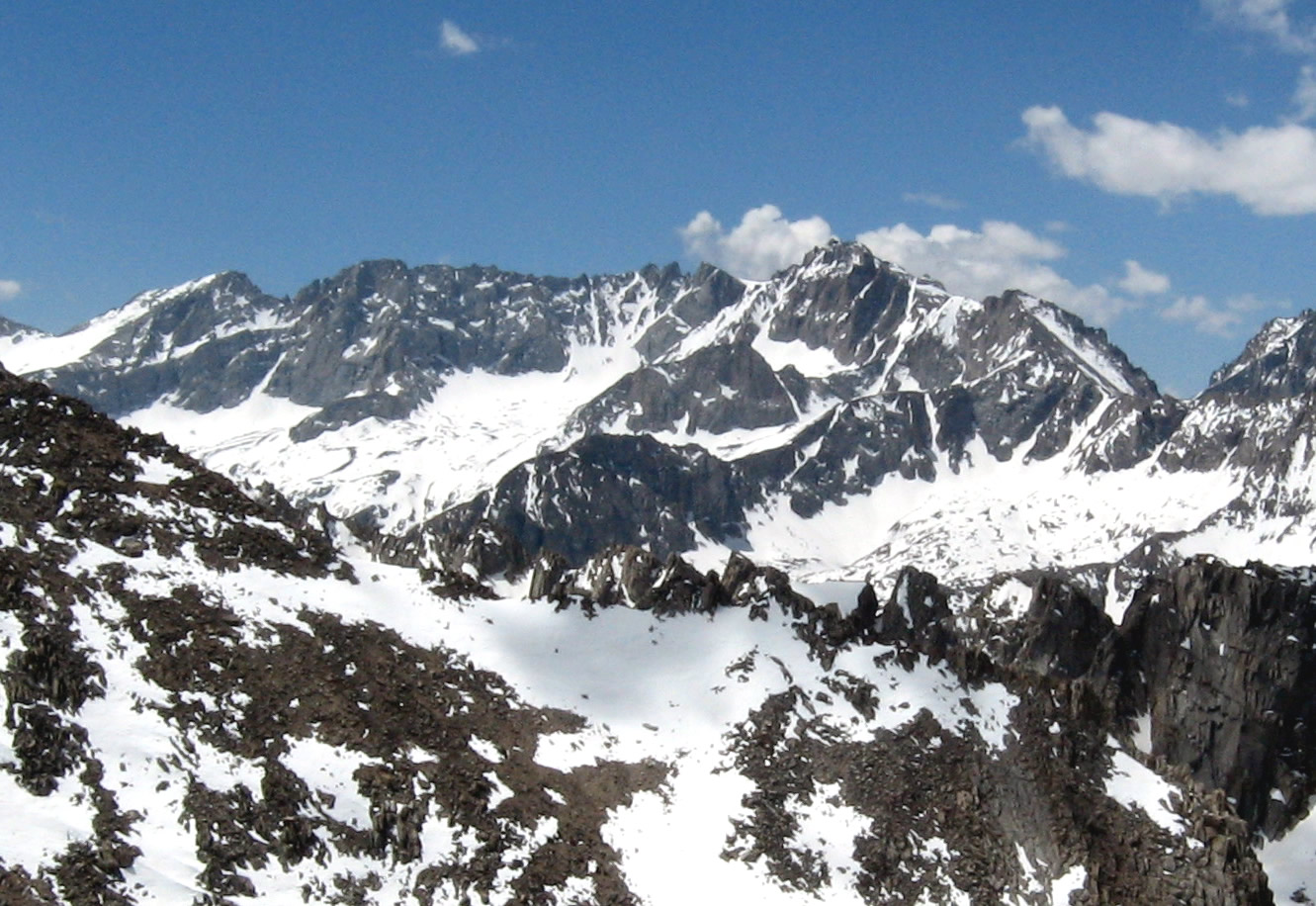
- Mount Stanford's profile from Mount Gould to the north, May 2009.

Highest point
- Elevation: 13,979 ft (4,261 m) NAVD 88
- Prominence: 981 ft (299 m)
- Parent peak: Mount Keith
- Listing: Sierra Peaks Section; Western States Climbers Emblem Peak
- Coordinates: 36°42′14″N 118°23′45″W

Geography
- Location: Kings Canyon National Park, Tulare County, California, U.S.
- Parent range: Sierra Nevada
- Topo map: USGS Mount Brewer

Climbing
- First ascent: 1896 by Bolton Brown
- Easiest route: Exposed scramble, class 3

Mount Stanford, at an elevation of 13,979 feet (4,261 m), is on the Kings-Kern Divide in Kings Canyon National Park. It is named for Stanford University. It is the fifteenth tallest mountain in California and is located about 3.6 miles (5.8 km) from University Peak which was named for the University of California.

== History ==
On August 1, 1896 Professor Bolton Coit Brown of Stanford made the first recorded ascent and requested that it be named Mount Stanford. Since there was another peak with the same name in Placer County, he suggested the peak he climbed be named Stanford University peak if his first choice was rejected. The decision was made to give the name Castle Peak to the summit in Placer County and Brown's first choice was accepted. Three years later, on August 16, 1899, Stanford University's President, David Starr Jordan, also make the ascent with his wife and a party from Stanford. He had previously climbed in the Alps. In 1911, the U. S. Geological Survey (USGS) named a peak in honor of Leland Stanford, an American tycoon, politician and founder of Stanford University. The name originally given this summit was Stanford Peak but in 1982 the USGS changed its name to Mount Stanford. This other peak, with an elevation of 12,838 feet (3,913 m), is located 59 miles (95 km) to the north-northeast overlooking Pioneer Basin in the John Muir Wilderness.

== Getting There ==
Mount Stanford is described as an exposed scramble (class 3). It can be ascended by experienced mountaineers without ropes or special equipment during the late summer months. It can be most easily be reached from the Onion Valley trailhead, west of Independence and off U. S. Route 395.
