= Mount Hopkins (California) =

Mountain in United States of America

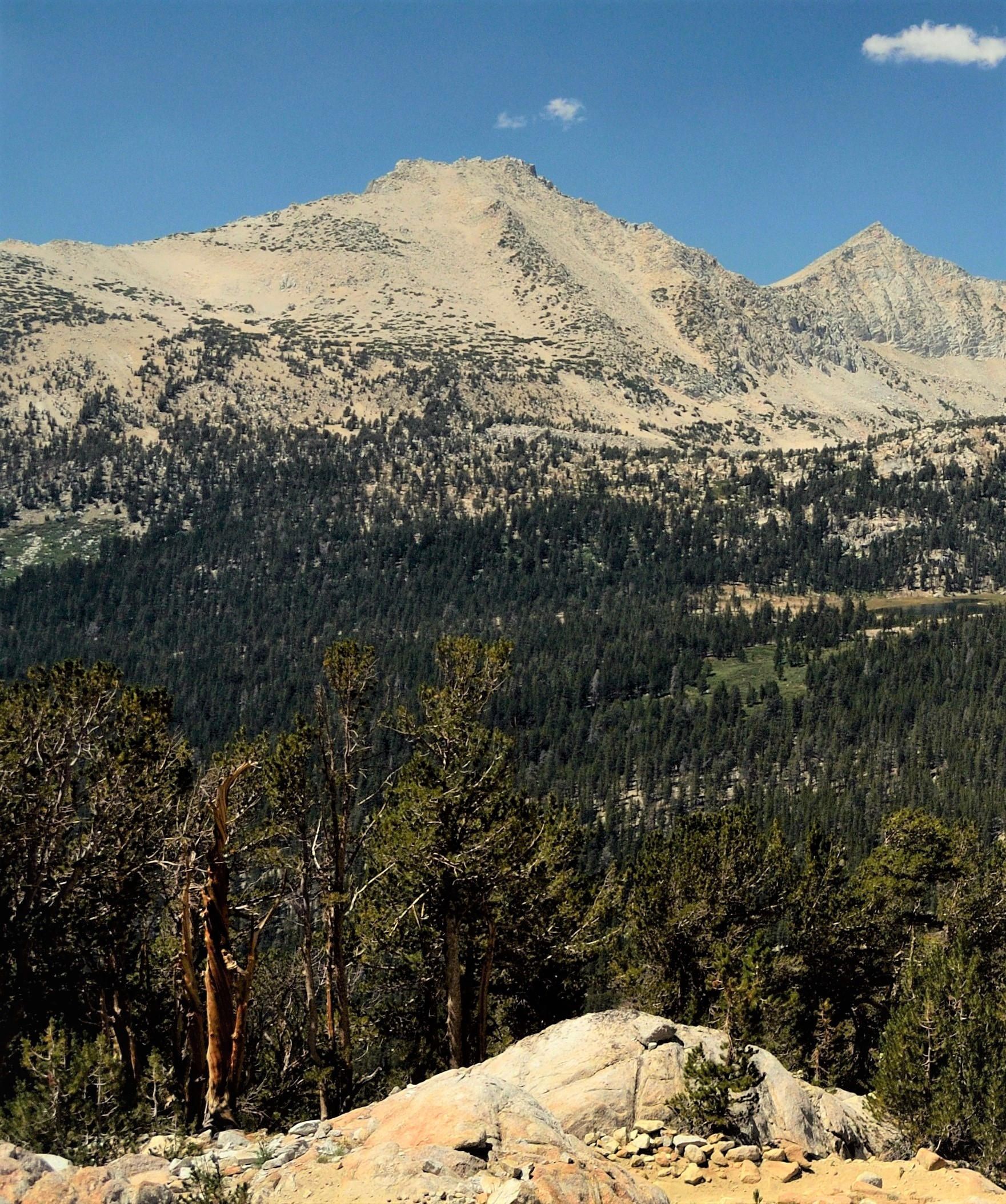
- Mount Hopkins southeast aspect

Highest point
- Elevation: 12,304 ft (3,750 m) NGVD 29
- Prominence: 424 ft (129 m)
- Coordinates: 37°27′50″N 118°48′46″W

Geography
- Location within California Location within the United States
- Location: Fresno County, California, U.S.
- Parent range: Sierra Nevada
- Topo map: USGS Mount Abbot

Climbing
- First ascent: 1934 by David Brower, Norman Clyde, and Hervey Voge
- Easiest route: Hike from the east

Mount Hopkins is a mountain in the John Muir Wilderness north of Kings Canyon National Park. It is one of four peaks that surround Pioneer Basin, 1.4 miles (2.3 km) south-southeast of Mount Crocker, 2 miles (3.2 km) west-southwest of Mount Huntington, and 2 miles (3.2 km) southwest of Mount Stanford. The mountain was named for Mark Hopkins, one of the builders of the Central Pacific Railroad.

== Climate ==
According to the Köppen climate classification system, Mount Hopkins is located in an alpine climate zone. Most weather fronts originate in the Pacific Ocean, and travel east toward the Sierra Nevada mountains. As fronts approach, they are forced upward by the peaks (orographic lift), causing them to drop their moisture in the form of rain or snowfall onto the range.
