= Mount Huntington (California) =

Mountain in California, United States

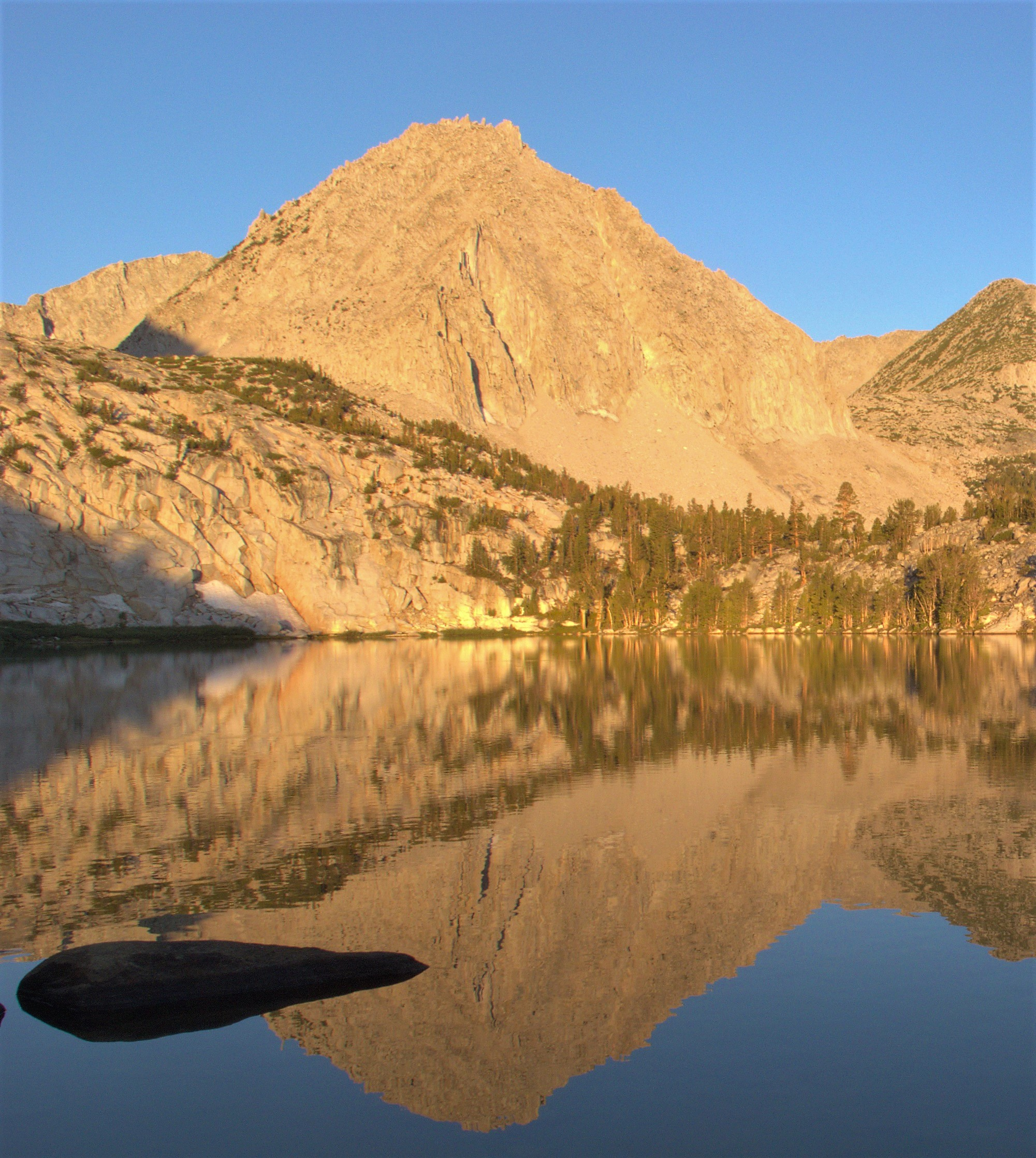
- Northeast aspect

Highest point
- Elevation: 12,355 ft (3,766 m) NGVD 29
- Prominence: 514 ft (157 m)
- Listing: Mountains of California
- Coordinates: 37°28′11″N 118°46′39″W

Geography
- Location within California Location within the United States
- Country: United States
- State: California
- County: Mono
- Protected area: John Muir Wilderness
- Parent range: Sierra Nevada
- Topo map: USGS Mount Abbot

Climbing
- First ascent: 1934 by David Brower, Norman Clyde, and Hervey Voge

Mount Huntington is a mountain in the John Muir Wilderness north of Kings Canyon National Park. It is one of four peaks that surround Pioneer Basin, 5 miles (8.0 km) northwest of Mount Crocker, 2 miles (3.2 km) northeast of Mount Hopkins, and 1.8 miles (2.9 km) south-southwest of Mount Stanford. The mountain was named for Collis Potter Huntington, one of the builders of the Central Pacific Railroad.

== Climate ==
According to the Köppen climate classification system, Mount Huntington is located in an alpine climate zone. Most weather fronts originate in the Pacific Ocean, and travel east toward the Sierra Nevada mountains. As fronts approach, they are forced upward by the peaks (orographic lift), causing them to drop their moisture in the form of rain or snowfall onto the range.
