= Richard Chase =

American serial killer and cannibal (1950–1980)

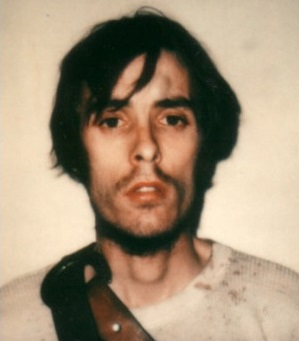
- Mug shot of Chase, 1978
- Born: Richard Trenton Chase; May 23, 1950; Santa Clara County, California, U.S.
- Died: December 26, 1980 (aged 30); San Quentin State Prison, California, U.S
- Other names: The Dracula Killer; The Vampire of Sacramento; The Vampire Killer
- Motive: Delusional commands (severe schizophrenia); Rape; Necrophilia
- Conviction: First-degree murder with special circumstances (6 counts)
- Penalty: Death (June 8, 1979)

Details
- Victims: 6 (Note: Chase's second victim, Teresa Wallin, was approximately three months pregnant at the time of her murder; if her unborn child is included, his victim total is seven.)
- Span of crimes: December 29, 1977 – January 27, 1978
- Country: United States
- State: California
- Date apprehended: January 28, 1978

Richard Trenton Chase (May 23, 1950 – December 26, 1980) was an American serial killer, cannibal, and necrophile known as the Vampire of Sacramento, the Dracula Killer, and the Vampire Killer, who killed six people between December 1977 and January 1978 in Sacramento, California.

All of Chase's victims were chosen at random. His first victim was killed in a drive-by shooting; his subsequent victims were murdered inside their own homes, with the primary motive behind these murders being the mutilation of their bodies and the consumption of their blood and organs. Tried and convicted of six counts of first-degree murder, Chase was sentenced to death on May 8, 1979, with the jury ruling he was legally sane at the time of the commission of the crimes. He died of an overdose of Sinequan on December 26, 1980, in an apparent suicide.

Chase became known by such titles as the "Vampire of Sacramento" because the majority of his murders were committed with the intention to consume his victims' blood in his delusional belief he needed to consume the blood of other beings to replenish his own supply. The murders themselves have been described by a senior investigator within the Sacramento Police Department as the "most grotesque slayings" he had ever investigated in the 28 years he served with law enforcement.

== Early life ==
Richard Chase was born in Sacramento, California, on May 23, 1950, the first of two children born to Richard Edgar and Beatrice Lorene (née Neese) Chase; his only sibling was a younger sister.

The Chase household was middle class, and the family followed the Presbyterian faith. His parents were disciplinarians, and both siblings were frequently beaten by their father throughout their childhood. Both parents were prone to arguing with each other during Chase's childhood, and his mother—tormented by suspicions her husband was unfaithful to her and trying to poison her—sought psychiatric treatment on at least two occasions in the early 1960s. (Note: Psychiatric interviews conducted prior to Chase's sentencing concluded Chase's mother was schizophrenic and emotionally unstable to concentrate on socializing her son.) The couple separated in 1964, with their children briefly residing with relatives in Los Angeles, but later reconciled.

By the age of ten, Chase had begun exhibiting the traits of the Macdonald triad: cruelty to animals, fire-setting, and bedwetting, three behaviors frequently associated with violent behavior in adulthood. He is also known to have developed a rich fantasy life dominated by thoughts of power in addition to a selfish and inconsiderate personality. These internal issues did not greatly affect Chase's early school or social life, with over sixty children attending one of his birthday parties.

=== Adolescence ===
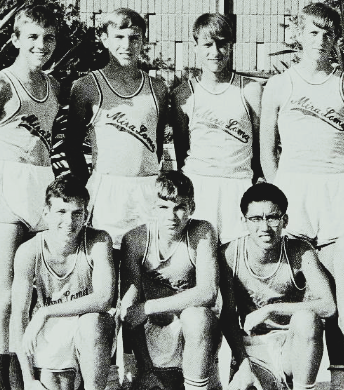
Chase (back row, third left), pictured at age 16 in 1966

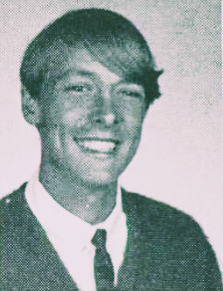
Chase, pictured in the 1967 Mira Loma High School yearbook, Recuerdos

From 1964 to 1968, Chase attended Mira Loma High School. While enrolled at high school, he developed a reputation among his peers as something of a loner, although he did have a small circle of friends—many of whom were known throughout the school as "acid-heads". By his mid-teens, he had become a heavy user of drugs such as marijuana and LSD in addition to frequently drinking heavily. He would accrue a minor criminal record throughout the 1960s for both possession and theft, for which he was ordered to perform community service. Although Chase possessed an average IQ of 95, he was a largely unmotivated student—typically achieving C, D and F grades. Nonetheless, Chase did graduate from high school on June 6, 1968. He received a Volkswagen from his parents as a graduation present.

Although Chase generally had difficulty interacting with women, he did begin dating girls in 1965; however, he soon discovered that he was impotent, which greatly affected his self-esteem. According to one former girlfriend, she and Chase were unable to have sex the first time they attempted to do so due to his inability to maintain an erection. The relationship continued nonetheless, although his continual failure to achieve or maintain an erection contributed to their eventual split in 1966. Shortly thereafter, at a friend's party, Chase—intoxicated—broke down in tears and confided his frustrations regarding his impotence to his friends.

Seven months after Chase's eighteenth birthday, he visited a psychiatrist who specialized in adolescent issues to discuss his impotence and tensions within his family; he was informed his inability to maintain an erection may source from extreme suppressed anger, possibly directed at women in general.

== Early adulthood ==
=== College ===
Shortly after graduating from high school, Chase enrolled at American River College. Beginning in 1969, while still enrolled at American River College, Chase began working as an administrative assistant for Retailers Credit Association. This employment lasted several months, but would prove to be the only job Chase held for any significant duration of time. Chase would alternate between various roles of employment over the following two years, although due to his poor work ethic and drug use, none of these jobs lasted more than a few weeks.

In 1970, Chase moved out of his parents' home and into an apartment on Annadale Lane. He shared this apartment with two young women named Cyd Evans DeMarchi and Rachel Statum, both of whom he knew and whom he had convinced to let him become their roommate. His parents gave him $50 each month to help him pay his share of the rent. Three months later, DeMarchi and Statum moved out of the apartment due to Chase's behavior and his neglecting of household responsibilities. He was usually high on drugs, suspected of dealing marijuana, and frequently walked around naked in front of female visitors. Increasingly isolated, he also barricaded himself in his room, explaining that he did this so no one would be able to "sneak up" on him. Shortly thereafter, Statum's brothers and their friends moved into the apartment. These roommates had a rock band, and Chase often interrupted their rehearsals, insisting on playing the conga with them; however, they resisted these requests due to his poor musical ability. This resistance frequently caused arguments, but Chase joined in anyway.

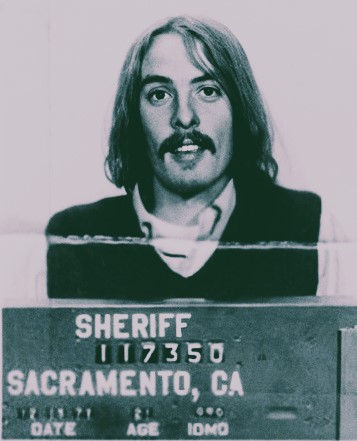
December 1971 mug shot of Chase, taken following his arrest for possession of marijuana

Within months, Statum's brothers and their friends had also moved out of the apartment due to Chase's erratic behavior, extreme drug use, and poor hygiene. As Chase was unable to afford the rent, he soon moved back into his parents' home.

Typically achieving C grades and again developing a reputation among his peers as a loner, a lackadaisical student and a heavy user of drugs and alcohol, Chase eventually dropped out of college in 1971. In December of the same year, he was arrested by the Sacramento Police Department for the possession of marijuana.

=== Mental deterioration ===
Chase's parents separated in June 1972; they divorced six months later, and his father later remarried. Thereafter, Chase divided his time between his parents, although both parents found it difficult to deal with his increasingly erratic behavior in addition to an increasingly slovenly lifestyle. His father continued to believe that the troubles in his son's life sourced not from mental illness, but a poor work ethic and misguided values. As such, the two frequently argued, with Richard Sr. frequently instructing his son to "straighten up" and "get a job". During one heated argument with his mother in late 1972, Beatrice attempted to call the police. In response, Chase grabbed the phone and struck his mother across the head with it before running out of the house and jumping over a fence. Chase's mother did call the police; she was informed she could press charges against her son if she wished, but decided not to.

During one lone trip to Utah in 1972, Chase was arrested for driving under the influence. Two weeks later, having returned to California, he claimed to his parents that he was "quite ill" due to being gassed by officers in a Utah jail, and that he intended to sue the police. His father—who had bailed him out of jail—convinced him against suing the police.

By early 1973, Chase had begun obsessively worrying about his physical health. That summer, he began cutting out photos of human organs from a Gray's Anatomy medical book and pasting the images on his bedroom walls in an effort to understand what he believed was wrong with him. He also began seeking medical help for his perceived ailments; on one occasion in approximately 1973, Chase called an ambulance to his house, which arrived with a stretcher that he had requested. However, the paramedics refused to take him to the hospital when they determined that he was not suffering from a medical emergency and suggested he undergo a psychiatric evaluation. By this stage, Chase's sister had become markedly afraid of him and made efforts to avoid being alone in his company; his mother—having noted he had begun hearing voices and regularly made comments to the effect of "Stop bothering me!" to himself—made arrangements for him to see two separate doctors. Chase was dissatisfied with the prognosis these doctors gave him, so he went to see a doctor named Donald Ansel. Ansel discovered no physical ailments, and concluded that Chase had a "psychiatric disturbance of major proportion".

In part due to increasing tensions between himself and his parents, Chase relocated to Los Angeles to live with his paternal grandmother in May 1973. His grandmother and uncle both worked for a school for mentally disabled children, and his uncle was able to obtain employment for Chase as a school bus driver. He was fired from this job for failing to perform the necessary maintenance work on the vehicle and allowing it to run low on oil.

After being fired from his job, Chase spent most of the day in his bed, roaming the house at night. His grandmother also noted his odd behavior and evident hypochondria, with Chase constantly complaining of heart and stomach pains. He refused to eat any meals his grandmother cooked for him, and insisted on cooking his own meals. His grandmother also heard him talking to himself when alone in his bedroom—most frequently asking himself the question, "Richard, are you a good boy?" before replying to himself, "Yes, you're a good boy." On other occasions, Chase's grandmother observed him standing on his head; his explanation was that his head hurt and he was attempting to increase the circulation of blood to his head. Chase's grandmother later bought him a plane ticket to return to Sacramento.

=== Institutionalization ===
On December 1, 1973, Chase walked into the emergency room of the American River Hospital in a manic state, alleging to have suffered a cardiac arrest and shouting that the blood had ceased flowing through his body, that he was unable to breathe and claiming both that his head was changing shape and that his pulmonary artery had been stolen. Physicians discovered no ailments, and Chase was admitted to the hospital's psychiatric unit.

Doctor Irwin Lyons noted in his report that Chase was "tense, nervous and wild eyed", describing him as a "filthy, disheveled, deteriorated and foul-smelling white male". Hospital staff diagnosed Chase as a chronic paranoid schizophrenic, though conceded the possibility the condition sourced from his extreme drug abuse. Two days after his admission to the psychiatric unit, Chase was discharged from the facility against the doctors' advice when his mother confronted the psychiatric ward staff. In his discharge report, Lyons noted Beatrice Chase was "highly aggressive, hostile [and] provocative", adding that she was "the so-called schizophrenogenic mother".

== Release ==
Following his discharge from the psychiatric unit, Chase's mental health allegedly improved. According to Beatrice Chase, her son had been distressed by the experience of his institutionalization and she was able to "work with him" for approximately two years—ensuring he took his medication, refraining from drug and alcohol abuse, eating healthier, and improving his personal hygiene. (Richard Chase Sr. would later dispute these claims.)

=== Relapse ===
By late 1975, Chase had relapsed into frequent drug abuse, and from early 1976, his mental health began to deteriorate considerably. He became markedly paranoid and intemperate, and his hypochondria led to behavior such as his holding oranges onto or alongside his head, believing vitamin C would be absorbed by his brain via diffusion. Convinced his body was not producing sufficient blood, his fixation with blood increased greatly. Chase additionally believed that his cranial bones had become separated and were slowly moving around his skull; on one occasion, he shaved his head to be able to monitor this activity.

As her son's mental state deteriorated, Beatrice Chase again began hearing him talking to himself. According to his mother, he began to struggle to effectively sign his own name, and on two occasions, he also ordered her to stop controlling his mind; he later also accused his sister of controlling his mind. On several occasions, Chase and his mother engaged in heated arguments, occasionally resulting in either Chase striking his mother, or she and her daughter fleeing the household and summoning Richard Sr. to calm his son. On one occasion in approximately February 1976, as Chase spoke with his father on the telephone following another heated argument, Chase tore his mother's phone from the wall, terminating the call. This incident prompted both of Chase's parents—but particularly his father—to resolve to find an apartment for their son. Thereafter, he briefly resided with his father, who soon found an apartment for his son on Cannon Street. He moved into this apartment in March 1976, surviving on welfare and financial assistance from his parents, and with his father paying his rent and visiting him on a weekly basis.

== Cannon Street ==
Shortly after moving into his Cannon Street apartment, Chase began to frequently consume animal blood and plasma in a delusional belief that his doing so was a survival necessity to replenish his own insufficient and contaminated blood supply. Initially, Chase primarily killed rabbits he bought at a nearby rabbit farm; after purchasing the rabbits, he consumed their raw entrails and flesh at his apartment—frequently liquefying the animal intestines and blood, mixed with cola, in his blender in the belief his doing so would prevent his heart from shrinking. Initially, Chase kept his apartment relatively clean, and his father would frequently visit to play games of chess. When Chase's father asked why he had begun keeping live rabbits, Chase responded by saying that he was eating them; his father never looked into this claim further, having long grown accustomed to his son's fanciful statements.

=== Involuntary committal ===
==== American River Hospital ====
On April 26, 1976, Chase was involuntarily committed to a mental institution for a second time. This occurred when he was taken to the emergency room of American River Hospital, having injected rabbit's blood into his veins. His father had found him lying on the floor of his apartment vomiting, shaking, barely able to move, and complaining of having eaten a "bad rabbit". Chase initially explained to staff he had been poisoned by a rabbit he had eaten, before claiming the rabbit had battery acid in its stomach, which had begun burning through his own stomach. Staff concluded that he was mentally ill, and he was sent to American River Hospital's psychiatric unit. He was again diagnosed as a paranoid schizophrenic, with staff recommending he be detained for seventy-two hours to undergo further assessment. He refused to participate in any group activities and insisted he was only suffering from food poisoning, but did confide to staff that he needed to drink blood because his body was weak and "falling apart" because his circulatory system failed to function normally. (Note: While detained at this psychiatric unit, Chase was subjected to several neurological examinations—all of which revealed no physical ailments.)

==== Beverly Manor Psychiatric Hospital ====
On May 19, Chase was involuntarily transferred to the Beverly Manor Psychiatric Hospital in the Sacramento suburb of Carmichael. The staff at this institution also diagnosed Chase with severe schizophrenia; staff also noted he failed to react to prescribed anti-psychotic medication, leading doctors to conclude his mental issues stemmed from his heavy and prolonged drug use. On several occasions, staff discovered Chase concealed in bushes on the grounds of the property with blood around his mouth and the decapitated remains of a sparrow or other small bird upon the ground. When asked why he had killed the bird, Chase invariably refused to answer. On another occasion, staff discovered two birds with broken necks outside Chase's window; Chase—again with blood around his mouth—denied any responsibility for the birds' deaths, insisting the blood around his mouth came from cutting himself while shaving.

=== Second release ===
Despite several setbacks, by the summer of 1976, Chase's condition had markedly improved, with the battery of treatments involving psychotropic drugs producing positive results. Staff notes indicate that by mid-September, he had not mutilated any birds, or requested blood to drink for "some time now". In addition, he had actively participated in group activities for over two months. Doctors believed they could not help him improve further and released him to his mother's custody on September 29, his parents having been granted a conservatorship to be subject to annual review and staff strongly emphasizing Chase continue to take his medication. (Note: Some staff members disagreed with the decision to release Chase. One of these staff members would later state to reporters: "It was his turn to be released, and anything we had to say or do about it was irrelevant." Another staff member stated: "When we learned [Chase] was going to be released, we all raised hell about it, but it didn't do any good.")

== Watt Avenue ==
Shortly after his release from the Beverly Manor Psychiatric Hospital, Chase moved into an apartment on Watt Avenue, with his mother paying his rent on the first day of each month and both parents shopping for his groceries and monitoring his condition. Initially, Beatrice Chase ensured her son took his medications, but increasingly believed the medications simply made him "easier to handle". Uncomfortable with her son's docile and submissive drugged status and believing he no longer needed to be medicated, Chase's mother weaned him off his medication, without consulting doctors, and by January 1977, Chase was no longer taking any prescribed medication. Shortly thereafter, Chase's delusions returned, and he began accusing his mother of attempting to poison him with dish soap.

Chase's preoccupation with his own health soon developed into extreme somatic delusions. Again convinced his heart was shrinking and that he needed to drink animal blood and eat their viscera to survive, Chase progressed from eating birds and rabbits to eating dogs. He both stole and purchased dogs and hanged them in his apartment before proceeding to drink their blood and consume their innards. He frequently responded to newspaper advertisements offering free dogs to good homes, offering to provide a stable home for unwanted pets and one occasion in the autumn of 1977, Chase responded to a local advertisement offering Labrador puppies for sale and persuaded the seller to allow him to purchase two dogs for the price of one. His mother also suspected him of stealing and killing both of her own dogs, although when she confronted her son, he denied her accusations.

As Chase's mental deterioration continued, both his personal hygiene and the living conditions within his apartment worsened. Initially, Chase permitted his parents to enter his apartment, though by the spring of 1977, his mother had begun complaining about the shambolic and unhygienic condition of his apartment, and Chase began refusing either parent access to his home. Thereafter, he solely permitted communication with his parents either via telephone or partially opening his front door.

Neighbors frequently heard shouting and banging noises emanating from his apartment and Chase was occasionally seen exiting his apartment with his mouth hanging open and carrying large boxes. On rare occasions when Chase encountered former high school and college acquaintances, he would focus his conversation solely on events which had occurred long in the past—avoiding subjects pertaining to intervening years.

=== Expiry of conservatorship ===
Although Chase's parents had been granted a conservatorship status of his estate and person, Chase gradually grew tired of the arrangement and insisted on becoming independent and taking a vacation. As such, his parents allowed the conservatorship to expire automatically in the summer of 1977, although his mother continued to pay his rent and bills. Shortly thereafter, she gave him $1,450 she had saved from his benefits (equivalent to $7,704 in 2025), and bought him a bus ticket to Washington, D.C. Three weeks later, Chase returned home, having purchased a 1966 Ford Ranchero in Colorado for $800 (equivalent to $4,250 in 2025).

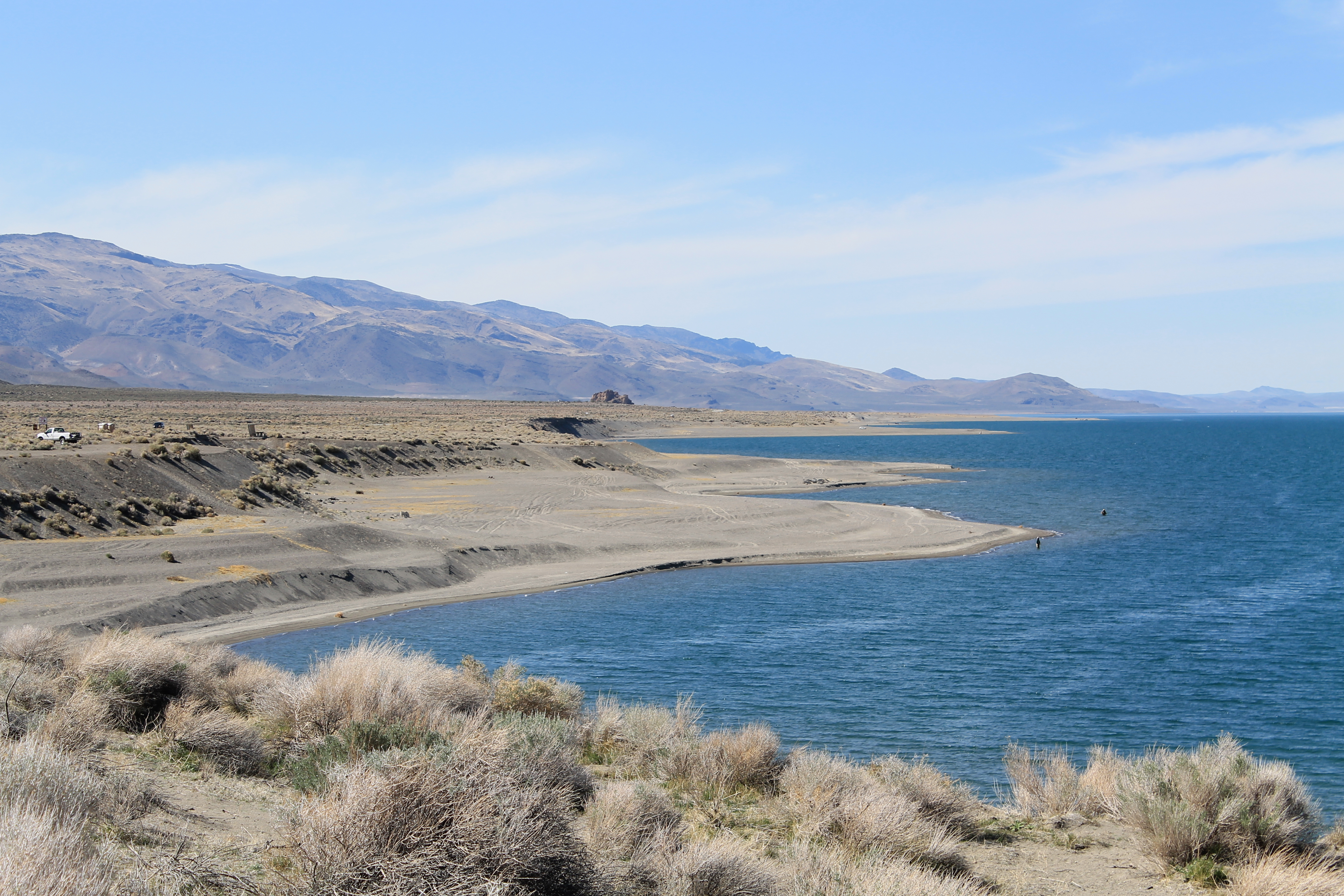
Pyramid Lake, Nevada. Chase was arrested at this location in 1977, having smeared his body and the interior of his vehicle in animal blood.

==== Pyramid Lake incident ====
On August 3, 1977, officers of the Bureau of Indian Affairs arrested Chase on a Native American reservation in Pyramid Lake, Nevada. The seats and inner panels of his Ford Ranchero were smeared with blood and a .22-caliber rifle, a .30-30 Marlin Model 336, a plastic bucket containing a raw liver and a bloodstained pile of men's clothing were discovered inside the vehicle.

Chase was discovered squatting naked on a rock ledge approximately half a mile (0.8 km) from his vehicle, his body smeared with blood. Suspecting that a homicide had occurred, Chase was arrested despite protesting the blood on his body and within his vehicle had seeped through his own skin. He later amended his story to claim he had shot a deer in Colorado "sometime in May" and had simply undressed to wash the blood from his body in the lake when arrested.

Four days later, laboratory tests confirmed the liver to source from a cow and the blood to be of bovine origin. As such, no charges were filed. Shortly thereafter, Chase returned to Sacramento, having been able to retrieve his vehicle but not his rifles.

== December 1977 ==
On December 2, 1977, Chase purchased a .22-caliber Stoeger Luger semi-automatic pistol for $69.99, having lied about his history of mental illness to do so. He was allowed to collect the gun on December 18. Thereafter, neighbors heard him shooting within his apartment. As the first box of bullets Chase purchased with the pistol contained fifty rounds of ammunition and he is known to have purchased a second box of ammunition on December 26, Chase is believed to have fired the gun on at least fifty occasions between December 18 and December 26.

In the early evening of December 27, Chase fired his pistol at the wall of a home as he drove by the household. Nobody was injured in this incident. Shortly thereafter, at approximately 6:30 p.m., he fired into the kitchen window of a nearby household. Nobody was injured in this second incident, although one bullet did tear through the hair of a woman named Dorothy Polenske, narrowly missing her head.

== Murders ==
=== Ambrose Griffin ===
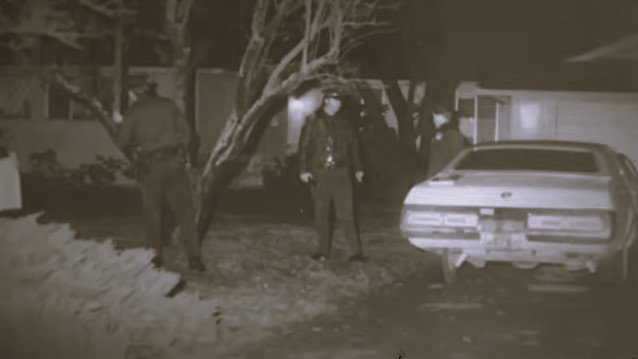
Detectives search for evidence at the home of Ambrose Griffin following his fatal shooting, December 29, 1977

On December 29, 1977, Chase killed his first known human victim. The victim, Ambrose Edward Griffin, was a 51-year-old engineer and father of two whom Chase targeted in a drive-by shooting. Griffin had just returned from a shopping trip with his wife, Carol, and was returning from the kitchen of his home to his vehicle to continue carrying bags of groceries into his house when his wife heard two "popping noises" before hearing her husband scream, turn to face her, then crumple to the ground. One of the rounds fired missed and struck a tree, but the other struck Griffin in the chest. Griffin's wife—initially believing that he had suffered a heart attack—ran to his side, screaming for help.

Griffin died of his wounds in a hospital emergency room. The shooting baffled police, who viewed the murder as a random and motiveless crime—possibly a thrill killing. (Note: Chase would later state that in the days prior to murdering Ambrose Griffin, he had been angered by his mother's refusal to allow him to visit her house over the Christmas season due to his sister having become acutely afraid of him following a recent incident in which he had appeared at her front door, offering her a dead cat, before tearing the animal apart in his mother's presence, then smearing its blood over his body. This incident was never reported to police.)

==== January 1978 ====
Two weeks after the murder of Ambrose Griffin, Chase attempted to enter the home of a lone woman; as her doors were locked, he walked away from the premises. On January 10, 1978, he purchased three further boxes of ammunition. One week later, he set two fires in apartments close to his own, believing the occupants had been spying on him and in an effort to force the occupants to leave, and on the weekend of January 21–22, Chase went rock-hunting with his father, then visited his mother's house. Both parents later stated Chase seemed calm and pleasant.

On the morning of January 23, Chase entered an unlocked and unoccupied household; he escaped from a window when the owners returned home at 10:40 a.m. The owners discovered $16, binoculars, a knife, a cassette player, and a stethoscope had been stolen, and that Chase had also urinated and defecated on their infant child's bed and clothing. Chase then returned home, retrieved his gun and changed from a blue jacket into an orange ski parka.

=== Teresa Wallin ===
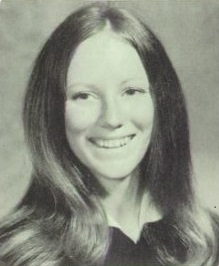
Teresa Wallin, pictured in 1973

On January 23, 1978, Chase broke into a house on Tioga Way and shot 22-year-old Teresa Lyn Wallin to death before extensively mutilating her body. Wallin was three months pregnant at the time of her death. She had been taking a bag of trash from the kitchen to the garbage when she encountered Chase, who entered her home through an unlocked door.

Chase first shot Wallin in the right hand as she dropped the bag of garbage and raised her hands to protect herself. This bullet passed through her palm and into the left side of her scalp. Chase then shot her through her right forearm, with the bullet entering her cheek, breaking her jaw and causing her to collapse to the floor, before approaching her body and fatally shooting her in her left temple from a distance of less than six inches. He then dragged her body into the master bedroom before retrieving a butcher's knife from the kitchen silverware drawer and an empty yogurt cup from the trash bag Wallin had dropped to the living room floor.

Wallin was extensively mutilated while lying on her back. Her turtleneck sweater was pulled up to expose her breasts before Chase severed her left nipple, repeatedly stabbed her breast through the wound, then cut open her torso from her sternum to her left hipbone, exposing her internal organs and causing sections of her intestines to protrude through the wounds and fall to the floor. The knife had penetrated her torso to a depth of a minimum of six inches, and multiple organs were removed, including the spleen, which was completely severed from her body. Both of Wallin's kidneys were severed and placed on the left side of her abdominal cavity beneath her liver. Her liver was stabbed, her diaphragm incised, and her pancreas sliced in two. Chase smeared Wallin's blood over his face and hands and licked the blood from his gloved fingers before smearing blood over Wallin's inner thighs. He then repeatedly dipped the yogurt container into her abdominal cavity to collect and drink her blood before washing the blood from his hands, gloves and face in the bathroom. He left the Wallin residence via the back door.

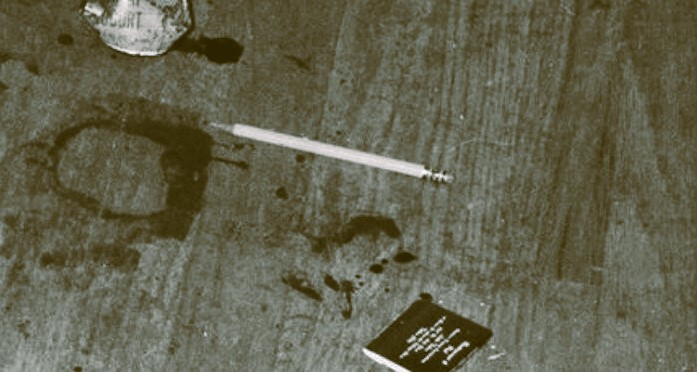
Crime scene image of blood rings at the scene of Teresa Wallin's murder created by containers used by Chase to collect and drink her blood

Before leaving the crime scene, Chase stuffed dog feces from Wallin's yard down her throat. Wallin's eyes were open and her tongue protruded from her mouth. Her facial features indicated she had died in a state of fear. A lead pencil, book of matches and a crumpled and crushed, bloodstained yogurt container were discovered on the hardwood floor beside her body. Also discovered on the hardwood floor were several ringlet-shaped bloodstains created as Chase consumed Wallin's blood through the yogurt cup.

Wallin's body was discovered by her husband, David, shortly after 6 p.m. Upon discovering his wife's body, David Wallin ran screaming from the house. Nothing had been stolen from the household, although some body parts were missing.

==== FBI profile ====
Shortly after the murder of Teresa Wallin, a Sacramento-based FBI special agent named Russell Vorpagel obtained the assistance of Virginia-based FBI profiler Robert Ressler. The two created their own psychological profile of the killer. They believed that the killer was a white male, aged 25 to 27, single, unemployed and a classic loner. He would be undernourished, with an extensive history of drug use, and suffering from one or more forms of paranoid psychosis. The murderer was a markedly disorganized offender, with evident mental health issues which had most likely begun to develop at around the age of fifteen, with the depth of the offender's psychosis increasing in severity over the previous eight to ten years, to the point of committing a murder of this nature and evidently consuming his victim's blood and retaining sections of her body.

The FBI profile also said that as a result of this mental illness, the killer likely didn't take care of himself, and would have a dirty, disheveled appearance. Furthermore, evidence of the crime would be found at the offender's residence, and the perpetrator would most likely repeatedly strike until he was caught.

=== Miroth family ===
On the morning of January 27, Chase parked his car in a shopping center, then entered the nearby Merrywood Drive home of Evelyn Elizabeth Miroth, a 36-year-old divorced mother of three. All four occupants in the household were shot to death, with Evelyn Miroth's body mutilated in a manner similar to that of Teresa Wallin. Their bodies were discovered by a neighbor at approximately 12:30 p.m. The crime scene was less than a mile from the home of David and Teresa Wallin.

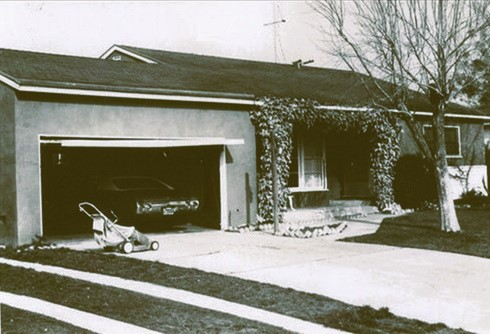
Sacramento Police Department crime scene image of the Miroth family home, January 27, 1978

Chase claimed to have been in a semi-conscious state when committing these particular murders. As such, the exact sequence of events that unfolded is unclear. Evidence indicates that in the hallway to the household, he encountered Miroth's 52-year-old friend Daniel James Meredith. Chase shot Meredith twice in the head—including once between the eyes—at close range, with both wounds exiting the back of his skull. Six-year-old Jason Bradford Miroth may have been shot prior to Meredith, as forensic evidence indicates Meredith had stepped in Miroth's blood before he fell. Evelyn Miroth and her 22-month-old nephew David Michael Ferreira were also shot to death, with evidence upon an extensively blood-soaked pillow within Ferreira's crib indicating Chase had shot the toddler while he was in his crib. (Note: Chase would claim to a prison trustee in February 1978 that he had shot Ferreira as the toddler was "screaming and crying" following the first three murders at the Miroth residence.)

Chase then dragged the bodies of Evelyn and Jason Miroth into the master bedroom, where he first undressed both himself and Evelyn Miroth, then extensively mutilated her abdomen with knives from her own kitchen in addition to engaging in necrophilia and cannibalism with her body. He also repeatedly stabbed Miroth in the anus, incised her neck, and attempted to enucleate one of her eyes. Chase then drained Evelyn Miroth's blood from her wounds into a green plastic bucket before finding a coffee cup which he used to drink her blood from the bucket.

Semen was discovered in Evelyn's mutilated anus, suggesting that, in spite of his impotence, Chase was able to obtain an erection and perform anal sex with her corpse. The bathtub was filled with bloodied water in addition to sections of brain and fecal matter, suggesting that Evelyn's corpse had been dragged from within or close to the bathroom to the bedroom where she was mutilated and sodomized. Aside from Meredith's wallet and car keys, nothing had been stolen from the crime scene.

While Chase was committing the mutilations upon Evelyn's body, a six-year-old neighbor, Tracy Grangaard, began knocking on the family door by prearrangement to inquire whether Jason Miroth was ready to accompany her and her mother upon a scheduled family day trip into the Sierra Nevada. Chase later informed police that this development startled him, and so he "took the baby and split". He fled the Miroth household with Ferreira's body in Meredith's Ford station wagon, which he parked in the lot of an apartment building on Marconi Avenue before taking the toddler's body into his own nearby apartment. He then retrieved his own vehicle.

Minutes later, the mother of Tracy Grangaard, having noted Meredith's station wagon was now missing from the Miroth household, alerted a neighbor named Catherine Belli as to Evelyn's uncharacteristic absence. She then drove with her daughter to the Sierra Nevada, deciding Evelyn had simply changed her plans. Belli informed a friend named Nancy Turner of these developments; Turner then attempted to knock on the back door, only to discover the door open. She entered the property and discovered the body of Daniel Meredith. Turner fled from the house, alerting neighbors. Two men driving a Salvation Army truck nearby contacted the Sacramento County Sheriff's Office. Officers began arriving at the Miroth household at 12:43 p.m.

The first officer dispatched to the scene, Ivan Clark, discovered Daniel Meredith lying face down on the floor near the hallway with two live and one spent .22-caliber cartridges near his body; they also discovered a nude woman lying on the bed in the master bedroom with extensive mutilations from her sternum to lower stomach and several internal organs protruding from the gaping wounds. She had been shot above her right eye. Two bloodstained knives lay on the bed near her head and left hand, and her hair was still wet, as if she had recently bathed. Jason Miroth's fully-clothed body lay beside the same bed, having been shot once in the head and once in the back of the neck. A large circular bloodstain was upon the floor by her bed. (Note: Sacramento detective Ray Biondi later said it had been difficult for him to look at the body of six-year-old Jason Miroth, since he also had a six-year-old son at the time. Jason Miroth had been dressed in clothing suitable for his expected day trip to the Sierra Nevada with the Grangaard family.) The bathroom tub was full of bloodstained water, feces, and brain matter, (Note: Pathologists would later determine the brain tissue within the bathtub sourced from David Ferreira, suggesting he had begun to mutilate the toddler's body in the bathroom at the time Tracy Grangaard had knocked on the door to the premises.) and an empty coffee cup lay on the floor near the door. A single, spent .22-caliber casing was discovered in a bloodstained, empty crib.

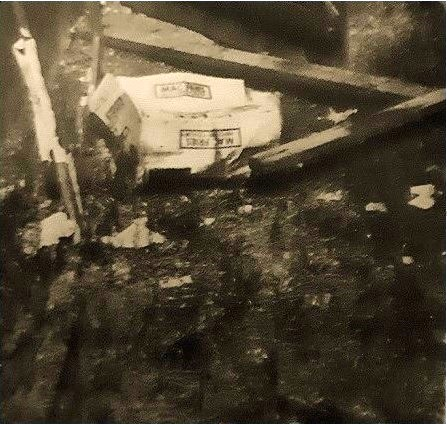
The cardboard box containing the body of David Ferreira, as discovered on March 24, 1978

At his apartment, Chase decapitated Ferreira's body before mutilating his chest, removing several organs and collecting and drinking his blood. He also stabbed Ferreira in the anus and cut open sections of the back of his skull, consuming sections of his brain. Ferreira's partially mummified body was discovered concealed in a cardboard box in an alleyway between a church and a supermarket on March 24. The location was approximately three-quarters of a mile (1.21 km) from Chase's apartment.

=== Police investigation ===
Due to the nature of the mutilations upon the female victim, the evident consumption of the victim's blood, and the close proximity of the crime scenes, investigators almost immediately connected the murders to the Wallin slaying. Investigators also discovered that the murderer had left complete handprints and shoe imprints in Evelyn Miroth's blood, thus providing further physical evidence as to his identity. Furthermore, Meredith's station wagon was discovered close to the crime scene with the door ajar and keys still in the ignition, supporting investigators' contentions the perpetrator lived locally—most likely less than 1 mile (1.6 km) from where the vehicle had been abandoned.

Armed with an updated psychological profile of the murderer and a composite drawing of the suspect, over sixty police officers conducted extensive door-to-door inquiries in the neighborhood of the Wallin and Miroth households, primarily focusing on properties within a half-mile radius of the abandoned station wagon. Residents were asked if they had seen either the red Ford station wagon or a young, disheveled and undernourished white male on January 27. Two eyewitnesses had seen the station wagon being driven in the neighborhood on January 27, but were unable to provide a clear description of the driver; however, shortly before midday on January 28, a former high school acquaintance of Chase named Nancy Holden contacted the police to inform them that, shortly before midday on the date of the Wallin murder, she had been approached by a man in an orange ski parka while she was in a shopping center close to the Wallin household. (Note: Chase had been wearing an orange ski parka his father had purchased for him on December 15 as a Christmas gift at the time of the commission of the murders at the Wallin and Miroth households.) Initially, Holden had failed to recognize the individual, but when the man asked her if she had been "on the motorcycle when Curt was killed", she replied "No", and asked who he was. (Note: Curtis Silva was an ex-boyfriend of Holden's who had died in a motorcycle accident while the pair were in high school.) He introduced himself as "Rick" and she realized the man was Richard Chase.

Holden was shocked by his disheveled and emaciated appearance, also noticing that he had bloodstains on him, that his eyes seemed sunken into their sockets, and that a thick yellow crust encircled around his mouth. She had been so unsettled that when Chase followed her from the supermarket to the parking lot and asked her for a ride, she stated she was now married, then locked her car and drove off as Chase attempted to unlock her passenger-side door. Furthermore, Holden was adamant Chase bore a strong likeness to the composite drawing of the suspect.

The Wallin household was located beyond a small park adjacent to this parking lot. Chase is believed to have encountered Teresa Wallin several minutes after his conversation with Holden.

== Arrest ==
A police search of DMV records revealed that a Richard Trenton Chase resided in an apartment on Watt Avenue, less than a block from Meredith's abandoned station wagon. A criminal record check further revealed this individual had been arrested in 1973 for carrying a handgun, and that he had been briefly listed as missing from the American River Hospital in 1976. Shortly after 5:40 p.m., three detectives drove to Chase's apartment to formally question him with regards to the murders.

Initially, Chase refused to either open his door or let police into his apartment. He also terminated a phone call from one of the detectives. Police then attempted a ruse to lure Chase out of his apartment by deceiving him into believing they were leaving, with one officer ostensibly leaving the scene as two others strategically positioned themselves at either side of his front door. Shortly thereafter, Chase left his apartment, carrying a box of bloodstained rags beneath his arm. He was subdued, arrested, and his pistol confiscated following a brief chase and scuffle during which he shouted to the officers that he had "done nothing".

As Chase was driven to the police station, he remarked to officers: "My apartment's a lot cleaner, isn't it? I didn't do anything in my apartment except kill a few dogs." A search of the box of bloodstained rags Chase had been carrying at the time of his arrest—which he had thrown at one of the officers immediately prior to being subdued—revealed the contents to also include a bloodstained green plastic bucket, a diaper pin, and pieces of a toddler's brain. That evening, officers obtained a warrant to search Chase's apartment and vehicle.

A search of Chase's vehicle revealed a twelve-inch butcher's knife and a pair of bloodstained rubber boots in the trunk. The walls, floors and ceiling of his apartment were extensively bloodstained, with investigators also discovering several bone fragments and an extensively bloodstained electric food blender in the kitchen. Several dishes in the refrigerator contained human body parts, and a container held human brain tissue. Several knives also discovered in the kitchen had been stolen from the Wallin residence, and a bloodstained hatchet lay in a kitchen drawer. An amber cup caked with blood was discovered in the bathroom, and numerous dog leashes and collars were also found upon a wall. A bloodstained half loaf of French bread lay upon his couch, and an unwashed dinner plate containing a piece of brain tissue lay upon Chase's bed.

A calendar on the wall of Chase's apartment had the word 'Today' written on the dates of the Wallin and Miroth murders; Chase had written the same word upon this calendar on forty-four further dates throughout 1978.

I had to do it. I have blood poisoning and I need blood. I thought about it for several weeks and decided I was tired of hunting and killing animals so I could drink their blood. I decided I would kill humans for their blood ... I saw a lady out in front of one of the houses. I walked by and watched her. She went into the house and I followed her ... The door was left unlocked. I pulled my gun and went in.

— Richard Chase, recounting the murder of Teresa Wallin (1978).

=== Murder charges ===
Chase was repeatedly interrogated throughout the late afternoon and evening of January 28. He freely admitted to having killed numerous animals and to drinking their blood and consuming their viscera, but denied any culpability in the recent murders. He remained steadfast in this assertion when confronted with the physical evidence upon his person at the time of his arrest and the discoveries within his apartment, on one occasion stating to detectives: "My parents didn't bring me up that way. I wouldn't do anything like that" before alleging police were attempting to frame him for the crimes.

On the evening of January 28, Chase was formally charged with the murders of Teresa Wallin, Daniel Meredith, and Evelyn and Jason Miroth, plus the kidnapping and murder of David Ferreira, with Sacramento County Sheriff Duane Lowe informing the media investigators had obtained sufficient physical evidence to conclude Ferreira was also deceased. Shortly thereafter, ballistic testing revealed Chase's pistol had also been used to kill Ambrose Griffin, and he was additionally charged with his murder. He was formally indicted by a grand jury to stand trial for all six murders on February 28, with the 11-count indictment also accusing Chase of one count of robbery, and several counts of mayhem in relation to the mutilation of three of his victims' bodies.

=== Psychological assessments ===
Prior to his indictment, Chase was assessed by two psychiatrists at the request of the district attorney's office. Initially, he refused to speak with them, but later consented to be interviewed and evaluated. He gradually recounted his crimes in a detached manner—insisting his motive for the murders had been to replenish his own contaminated blood supply. Chase also claimed that his mother had been poisoning him with "doses of dish soap" for some time and that his father, while "easy to get along with", did not care about his being poisoned. He denied suffering from any form of paranoid delusions, replying to this particular question with the statement: "There seems to be enough evidence that proves that I don't think I'm suffering from any delusions or persecution, but that I am really persecuted."

In June 1978, Chase formally complained to the assistant district attorney that he had discovered "volatile acid" and "venereal diseases" in his food—all of which, he contended, resulted from a coordinated campaign against him by prison officials. He insisted on being provided with an angiogram to determine the extent of his body's deterioration. Although this request was denied, a judge did later rule Chase undergo a physical examination to determine whether he suffered from brain or stomach tumors. This ruling resulted in Chase's trial being postponed from November 1978 to January 1979.

Chase was later assessed by two court-appointed psychiatrists named Martin Bremer and Leland Silva to determine whether he was competent to stand trial. Both independently concluded Chase understood the criminality of his actions, was thus sane via the definitions of the law of California, and was able to testify in his own defense, with Bremer concluding Chase's actions sourced from a desire to seek relief from an "intolerable distress" resulting from delusions of his being poisoned, but that he appreciated the criminality of his actions; Silva concluded Chase suffered from a paranoid, antisocial personality disorder, but not schizophrenia, and that he had observed a "distinct shift in [Chase's] manner" when discussing legally sensitive topics, thus leading him to conclude Chase exhibited "no involuntary and uncontrollable disruption of the normal flow of thought processes". (Note: Psychologists and psychiatrists who had examined Chase prior to the court-appointed psychiatrists' assessments had been unable to agree as to whether Chase had been legally sane at the time of the commission of his crimes.) Furthermore, both Bremer and Silva concluded Chase's mental deterioration most likely began at approximately age fifteen.

== Trial ==
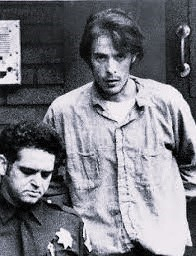
Chase, pictured at his trial in 1979

Chase was brought to trial in Palo Alto, California, on January 2, 1979. He was tried before Superior Court Judge John Schatz, charged with six counts of first degree murder. The chief prosecutor was Ronald Tochterman; he was assisted by Albert Locher. Chase was defended by Farris Salamy, (Note: Due to his delusions of being a persecuted Jew, Chase had initially requested he be defended by a lawyer from either the American Civil Liberties Union or the Jewish Defense League. His request was denied.) who entered a plea of not guilty by reason of insanity on his behalf.

=== Opening statements ===
In his opening statement on behalf of the prosecution, Ronald Tochterman outlined his intention to seek the death penalty, adding he intended to prove the murders had been "purposeful and calculated" and that Chase had demonstrated sufficient malice aforethought at the time of the crimes to conform his conduct to the requirement of the law. Tochterman further referenced the conclusions of a court-appointed psychiatrist who had extensively evaluated Chase prior to trial and who had determined Chase "was capable of not killing people. He had that choice."

Farris Salamy—who had previously unsuccessfully argued his client was incompetent to stand trial—declared in his opening speech his intention to prove that Chase's murders were not premeditated but a result of his client's "delusional thought process" resulting from his extensive and demonstrable mental illness and that as such, he should be found guilty of second degree murder, which would result in a sentence of life imprisonment. Salamy also outlined his client's delusional belief that his own blood was poisoned and that the motive behind five of the six murders was to replenish and purify his own blood, stating: "He suffers from an insidious psychosis that keeps a man from thinking. I think he did want blood, and whatever he had to do to get it—he did!"

=== Testimony ===
The prosecution called almost 100 witnesses to testify on their behalf and introduced 250 exhibits into evidence. The individuals to testify included family members of the victims, eyewitnesses, psychiatrists, police officers, and pathologists; the exhibits introduced into evidence included Chase's firearm which had been proven via ballistic testing to have murdered all six victims, Meredith's wallet and credit cards which Chase had in his possession at the time of his arrest, the knives stolen from the Wallin residence discovered within his apartment, and numerous other artifacts recovered from his car or apartment forensically linking him to the Wallin and Miroth crime scenes.

Referencing the progression in Chase's behavior between December 1977 and January 1978, Tochterman outlined his first purchasing a firearm, then practicing his marksmanship before fatally shooting Ambrose Griffin from a distance. Chase then progressed to entering occupied homes with a loaded firearm and rubber gloves, where he killed every occupant before precisely mutilating his female victims' bodies in a sadistic and sexual manner to obtain their blood. Tochterman therefore argued that Chase had demonstrated an intentional and premeditated thought process in the commission of his crimes.

In reference to the defense contention that Chase had been insane at the time of the commission of the crimes and his demonstrable history of psychological deterioration prior to December 1977, as attested by several defense witnesses, Tochterman stated: "The mere fact there is a pat psychological explanation does not mean [these] were not crimes in law."

On March 29, Richard Chase testified in his own defense. He freely admitted his murders, but claimed to be unable to recall all the details. Chase claimed to have not seen Ambrose Griffin when he fatally shot him, and to have been aimlessly wandering in a "semiconscious" state on the date of Teresa Wallin's murder, although he did recall drinking some of her blood. In reference to the Miroth murders, Chase claimed to have originally planned to shoot an old acquaintance he believed had become a political revolutionary, although he had changed his mind and instead entered the Miroth residence. He claimed to be unable to recall mutilating Evelyn Miroth's body, but conceded it was possible; he also claimed to have believed David Ferreira was not a toddler, but refused to elaborate, although he admitted taking the child's body from the Miroth residence in a "green bucket" and later decapitating him to obtain his blood.

In discussing his motive in five of the six murders, Chase emphasized the murders had been committed to obtain the victims' blood due to his own waning and contaminated blood supply, which had been the source of his physical ailments, thus preventing him from living a normal life in addition to normal sexual relations with women. Alluding to Chase's delusions and paranoia pertaining to his perceived blood poisoning, Salamy elicited testimony from Chase regarding his refusal to consume prison food, with Chase stating he refused to do so as he may "catch a worse case of cancer than [he already had]".

Psychiatrists also testified that Chase suffered from a persecution complex, adding that his desire to consume the blood of several of his victims sourced from his delusionary belief that his doing so would sustain his own lifespan.

=== Closing arguments and conviction ===
The trial of Richard Chase lasted four months. On May 3 and 4, 1979, both counsels presented their closing arguments before the jury retired to consider their verdict.

The defense repeatedly referenced Chase's documented mental illness and behavior attesting to insanity, with Salamy referencing the testimony of the psychiatrists who had testified on their behalf as to Chase's suffering from an extreme persecution complex and their conclusions as to his being legally insane—thus meaning he should not face the death penalty. Salamy also outlined the numerous, documented instances of his client's mental deterioration over the previous decade for which he had seldom received adequate treatment. He concluded his closing argument by urging the jury to find Chase guilty of second degree murder.

Ronald Tochterman presented the prosecution's closing argument before the jury. Tochterman described Chase's murders as being driven by a "sheer sexual sadism motivated by a literal blood lust". Though conceding that Chase "had and has" mental problems, Tochterman emphasized the premeditation of the murders, and how Chase's efforts to avoid detection demonstrated his legal sanity under the definitions of California law. Tochterman concluded his closing argument by urging the jury to disregard the testimony of the two defense psychiatrists who had stated Chase was legally insane before urging the jury to convict Chase of six counts of first degree murder.

Following six hours of deliberations over the course of two days, the jury found Chase guilty of six counts of first degree murder. The sanity phase was deferred until Monday, May 14. On this date, psychiatrists for both prosecution and defense again testified as to Chase's mental state at the time of the commission of the crimes before the jury began deliberations as to Chase's sanity. They would deliberate for sixty-five minutes before ruling Chase to have been sane under California law at the time of the commission of the murders, with the lead prosecutor convincing the jurors that Chase, while mentally disturbed, still appreciated the criminality of his actions. Three days later, the jury rendered a death verdict.

One month later, on June 8, Judge Schatz upheld the jury's death verdict and formally sentenced Chase to death, ruling the aggravating circumstances of Chase's crimes outweighed the mitigating circumstances and stating he would be transferred to San Quentin prison within ten days. Upon hearing the judge affirm the jury's recommendation that he be sentenced to death, Chase shouted that he remained the victim of poisoning conspiracies, blurting: "But they brainwashed me! There's a conspiracy and I'm still being poisoned here." Chase was transferred to San Quentin prison to await execution. His death sentence was automatically appealed to the Supreme Court of California.

== Imprisonment ==
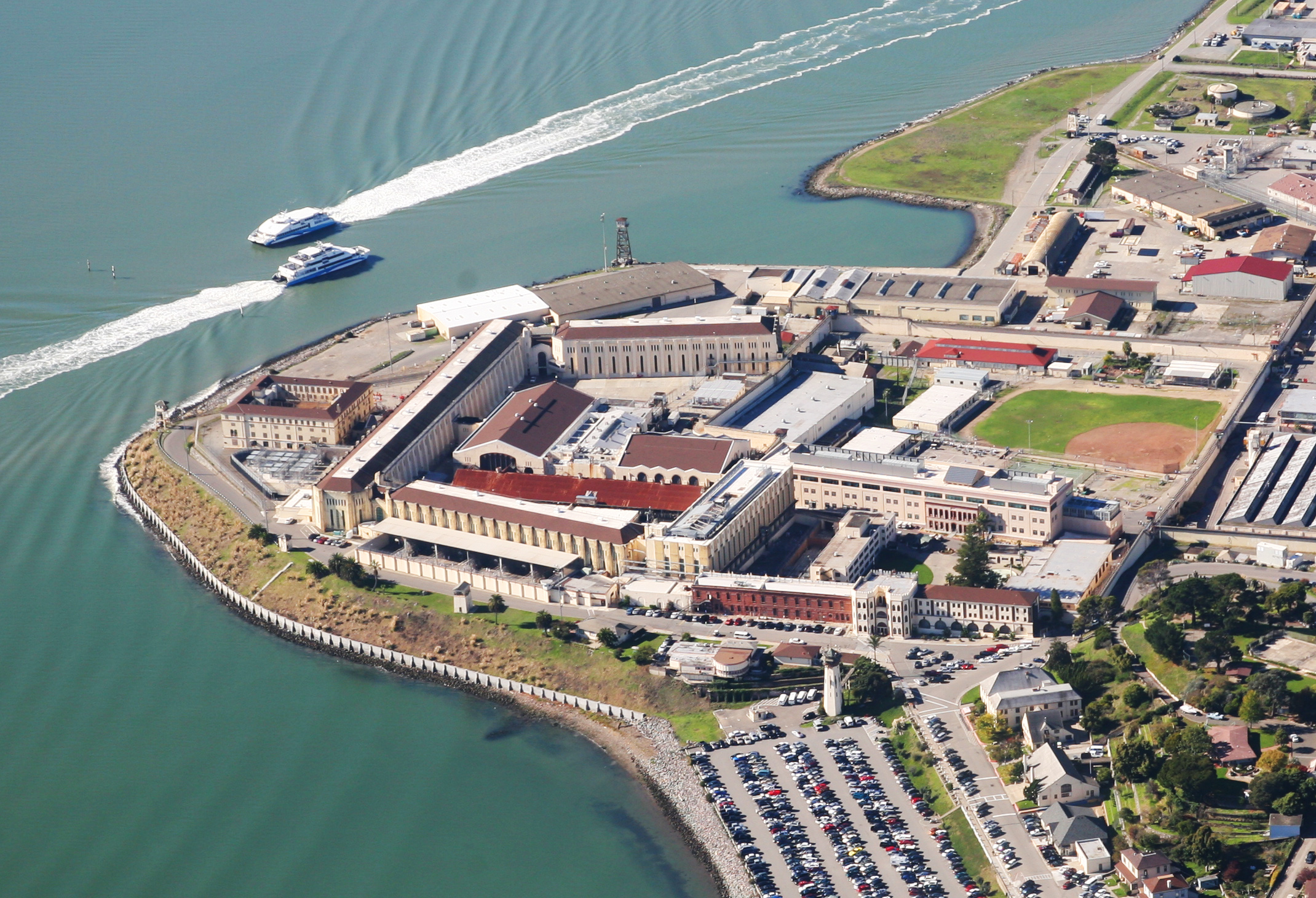
San Quentin prison. Chase was held on death row at this facility until his death in 1980.

While incarcerated on death row, Chase repeatedly requested staff provide him with fresh blood—human or otherwise—to consume for sustenance. His requests were denied. He was frequently taunted and threatened by several of the eighteen other death row inmates within the facility who, aware of the extremely violent and carnal nature of his crimes, vowed to kill him if an opportunity arose. According to prison officials, inmates also frequently tried to persuade Chase to commit suicide.

Shortly after his incarceration at San Quentin prison, Chase agreed to a face-to-face interview with FBI profiler Robert Ressler. In this meeting, Chase freely admitted to murdering his victims, but insisted the motive behind his crimes had been to preserve his own life via consuming their blood and organs, that his doing so had temporarily alleviated but not cured his "condition", and that he intended to appeal his conviction and sentencing on the grounds that he had been dying and had taken the lives of others to replenish his blood and thus prevent his own death. Furthermore, he contended the threat to his life resulted from soap-dish poisoning, and that he knew he had been contaminated because the bottom of the bar of soap in his soap-dish had been "gooey" as opposed to dry—thus meaning he had been contaminated.

When questioned as to the effects of this form of poisoning, Chase explained his blood had been gradually turning into powder, and the powder had been increasingly consuming his body and reducing his functioning capacities. He further claimed to have been instructed by telepathy to kill and replenish his blood, stating: "So you see, Mr. Ressler, you see very clearly that the killings were in self-defense." He further stated that all his victims had been chosen at random on dates he had preselected to murder, and that he had formed the belief that if a home he attempted to enter was locked, this was a sign that he was not welcome in the household, but that unlocked doors were an invitation to enter the premises.

Prior to concluding the interview, Chase handed Ressler a plastic cup containing sections of a packaged macaroni and cheese dinner, contending this was proof prison staff were attempting to poison him and requesting "the FBI lab in Quantico" analyze the contents to prove his claims. Ressler agreed to his request.

Shortly after this interview, at the request of prison psychologists, Chase was temporarily transferred to the California Medical Facility in Vacaville, California, which housed the criminally insane. He remained at this facility for four months. Ressler was supportive of this decision, having opposed the initial decision to send Chase to San Quentin following his conviction and believing that he should have instead been permanently institutionalized. (Note: Ressler would also opine that Chase embodied the pattern of a disorganized offender more than any other individual he had encountered throughout his entire career.) He was eventually transferred back to San Quentin in April 1980, having been deemed to be stabilized.

By late 1979, Chase had begun frequently writing letters to both Robert Ressler and FBI agent John Conway, emphasizing he needed to travel to Washington, D.C. to perfect his appeals and offering to share his knowledge with the FBI that the UFOs he claimed had communicated with him via telepathy were now causing airplane crashes and connected to antiaircraft weapons used against the United States. In his final letter to Ressler, Chase suggested that the FBI could easily detect the UFOs by radar and thereby conclude they followed his movements, adding "they follow me and are stars in the sky at night that light up through some type of controlled fusion reaction machines".

== Death ==
At 11:05 a.m. on December 26, 1980, Chase was found dead in his death row cell at San Quentin. He was lying on his stomach, with both legs extended off his bunk and his feet touching the floor. His head was turned into his mattress and his arms extended upwards into his pillow. He had last been seen alive when served breakfast at 7:45 a.m., when a guard observed him.

An autopsy revealed Chase had died from an overdose of fifty-milligram Sinequan tablets, a drug prescribed to treat depression and hallucinations, and that he had died approximately one hour prior to the discovery of his body. He had taken thirty-six times the recommended dosage, and unbeknownst to officers, had been secretly hoarding the pills in his cell for between two and three weeks. His autopsy also revealed no abnormalities with his heart.

San Quentin prison staff discovered four sheets of A4 paper covered in handwriting and illustrations within a cardboard box beside Chase's bunk. Two of the sheets contained an illustration approximating a graph, with the marking squares filled with an unknown cryptographic code; the other two pages contained a message in which Chase indicated that he may consume some pills which could cause his heart to stop beating.

In 1992, Sacramento detective Ray Biondi would reflect on the manner of Chase's death by writing: "I did note the irony in the way in which he died: Richard Chase ended up being poisoned to death all right—by his own hand" before adding, "Now, frankly, I was just relieved he was gone."

== Media ==
=== Film ===
- Rampage (1987). Directed by William Friedkin and starring Michael Biehn. The script of Rampage is inspired by a novel directly based on the life of Richard Chase.

=== Bibliography ===
- Biondi, Ray; Hecox, Walt (1992). The Dracula Killer. London: Mondo. ISBN 978-1-852-86455-2.
- Biondi, Ray; Hecox, Walt (2017). A Thirst for Blood: The True Story of California's Vampire Killer. New York: Open Road Media. ISBN 978-1-504-04904-7.
- Sullivan, Kevin (2012). Vampire: The Richard Chase Murders. Colorado: WildBlue Press. ISBN 978-1-942-26611-2.

=== Television ===
- Born to Kill? S02E03 "Richard Trenton Chase" (2010). A 45-minute documentary commissioned by Twofour Productions. Forensic psychiatrist Helen Morrison is among those interviewed for this documentary.
- World's Most Evil Killers S04E05 "Richard Chase" (2020). Narrated by Fred Dinenage. This 45-minute documentary was first broadcast in 2020.

== See also ==
- Crime in California
- Disorganized offender – Classification of serial killer
- Hypochondria – Excessive fear of developing illness
- Incidents of necrophilia
- Insanity defense
- List of incidents of cannibalism
- List of serial killers by number of victims
- Mental health – Level of psychological well-being
- Paranoia – Psychotic disorder
- Persecution complex – Delusion involving perception of persecution
- Schizophrenia – Mental disorder with psychotic symptoms

== Cited works and further reading ==
- Bartol, Curt R.; Bartol, Anne M. (2012). Criminal & Behavioral Profiling. California: SAGE Publications. ISBN 978-1-452-28908-3.
- Cimino, Al (2024). The World's Worst Serial Killers: Shocking Crimes and Unspeakable Murders. London: Arcturus Publishing. ISBN 978-1-398-84823-8.
- Clark, Doug (2002). Dark Paths, Cold Trails: How a Mountie Led the Quest to Link Serial Killers to Their Victims. London: Harper Collins Publishing. ISBN 978-0-002-00078-9.
- DeNevi, Don; Campbell, John Henry (2004). Into the Minds of Madmen: How the FBI's Behavioral Science Unit Revolutionized Crime Investigation. Connecticut: Globe Pequot Publishing. ISBN 978-1-591-02135-3.
- Egger, Steven A. (2024). The Killers Among Us: An Examination of Serial Murder and Its Investigation. New Jersey: Prentice Hall. ISBN 978-0-130-17915-9.
- Evans, Colin (1996). The Casebook of Forensic Detection: How Science Solved 100 of the World's Most Baffling Crimes. New York: John Wiley & Sons, Inc. pp. 160–163. ISBN 978-0-471-07650-6.
- Frasier, David K. (1996). Murder Cases of the Twentieth Century: Biographies and Bibliographies of 280 Convicted or Accused Killers. North Carolina: McFarland & Company. ISBN 978-0-7864-0184-0.
- Haines, Max (1994). Multiple Murderers. Toronto: Toronto Sun. ISBN 978-1-895-73506-2.
- Hickey, Eric W. (2006). Sex Crimes and Paraphilia. London: Pearson Education. ISBN 978-0-131-70350-6.
- Holmes, Ronald M.; Holmes, Stephen T. (2008). Profiling Violent Crimes: An Investigative Tool. Los Angeles: Sage Publishing. ISBN 978-1-412-95998-8.
- Howard, Amanda; Smith, Martin (2004). River of Blood: Serial Killers and Their Victims. California: Universal Publishers. ISBN 978-1-58112-518-4.
- Jackson, Janet L.; Bekerian, Debra A. (1997). Offender Profiling: Theory, Research and Practice. New Jersey: Wiley. ISBN 978-0-471-97565-6.
- Keppel, Robert D.; Birnes, William J. (2003). The Psychology of Serial Killer Investigations: The Grisly Business Unit. Massachusetts: Academic Press. ISBN 978-0-124-04260-5.
- Lane, Brian; Gregg, Wilfred (1992). The Encyclopedia of Serial Killers. London: Headline Publishing. ISBN 978-0-747-23731-0.
- Markman, Ronald; Bosco, Dominick (1989). Alone with The Devil: Psychopathic Killings that Shocked the World. London: Piatkus Publishing. pp. 159–193. ISBN 0-7499-1002-X.
- Newton, Michael (2008). Criminal Investigations: Serial Killers. New York: Facts On File, Incorporated. ISBN 978-1-438-11725-6.
- Ressler, Robert; Shachtman, Tom (1992). Whoever Fights Monsters: My Twenty Years Hunting Serial Killers for the FBI. New York: Simon & Schuster. ISBN 978-0-671-71561-8.
- Schechter, Harold; Everitt, David (2000). For Reel: The Real-life Stories that Inspired Some of the Most Popular Movies of All Time. New York City: Berkley Boulevard Books. ISBN 978-0-425-17271-1.
- Sullivan, Kevin M. (2018). Through an Unlocked Door: In Walks Murder. North Carolina: McFarland, Incorporated, Publishers. ISBN 978-1-476-63149-3.
- Thomas, Barry T. (2016). In the Company of Evil: Thirty Years of California Crime, 1950–1980. Pennsylvania: Schiffer Publishing. ISBN 978-1-507-30019-0.
- Vickers, Marques (2020). Famous West Coast Suicides and Shocking Celebrity Deaths. New Jersey: Marquis Publishing. ISBN 979-8-620-32065-3.
- Vronsky, Peter (2004). Serial Killers: The Method and Madness of Monsters. London: Penguin Publishing Group. ISBN 978-1-101-20462-7.
