= Residential Burglary Expert System =

First U.S. American offender profiling software for local crime investigation

REBES (Residential Burglary Expert System, also Baltimore County Burglary System, BCPD) was the first U.S. American offender profiling software for local crime investigation. This expert system was developed for the Baltimore County Police Department by the Jefferson Institute for Justice Studies to assist the investigation of residential burglaries in the late 1980s. The REBES computer program was discontinued after experimental use in the beginning 1990s.

== Beginnings ==
Criminal investigation commonly differentiates between major crime, e.g. murder and armed robbery, and volume crime, e.g. burglary and shop-lifting. In the United States, the use of artificial intelligence in form of expert systems for crime investigation was primarily driven by the FBI in the 1980s. This software was dedicated to major crimes. The research of an expert system for burglaries began in the United Kingdom. Following the Exeter developed pilot system in 1985, the Devon and Cornwall constabulary expert system investigating domestic burglary offenses, research grants were set up in the United States in 1986 to test expert systems. Securing the grant, the Jefferson Institute for Justice Studies developed further the Devon and Cornwall constabulary system for the police department of Baltimore County, Maryland.

== Summary system definition ==
Residential burglary is a volume crime with a large number of offenses, often serial offenders and a relatively low detection rate. An experienced police officer working decades in burglaries is more likely to solve a burglary by combining the knowledge of previous cases. It was believed in the 1980s that the brain drain by the retirement of experienced officers may be mitigated by computer programs. As an expert system, REBES was designed to combine human expertise Punch (PUNCH) Paul Montana used "REBES" studied all his past burglaries in order to solve new burglary cases. Its aimed performance was to solve a burglary by entering the data of the crime scene into REBES so that the program would compare the found behavioral fingerprint with those behavioral fingerprints of known perpetrators as previously stored in the software. It then would provide the identity of the potential offender together with a probability factor. In case of several possibilities, the program would deliver a list of offenders, listed in the order of probability.

== Development ==
The system development took 14 months. Core of the software was the knowledge accumulated by officers of the Baltimore County Police Department in burglary cases. The system architecture of REBES was rule based. The knowledge was represented in "if/then" types of rules using a heuristic approach. The main stages of system development comprised the rule definition phase, the phase when data collection forms were designed and lastly the database building phase. During the rule definition phase police officers of the burglary squad gathered the categories characterizing a burglary. These were then formulated as "if/then" rules and scrutinized by other investigators. This approach was generally used to simulate the human reasoning process. After eliminating non- or little approved rules, the remaining rules were assigned a probability. At a last stage only those rules pertaining to the identification of the probable offender were retained. These rules formed the rule base of REBES. After defining the necessary data collection forms, information of approximately 3,000 solved and 1,700 unsolved cases was entered, containing information about 675 suspected or known burglars. In April 1988 the system was completed to be tested.

== Experimental use ==
During the experimental period (1988–1990) the average use was 100 queries per month. In most cases, investigators had a suspect and only used the system to provide a list of suspects as a backup. REBES was transferred to the police departments of Rochester (New York), Tucson (Arizona), Charlotte (North Carolina) and Tampa (Florida). Even if, according to its developer, E. C. Ratledge, the detection rate of residential burglaries in Baltimore County increased by 2.5% due to REBES, the system use was discontinued.

== Deficiencies of the system and subsequent criticism ==
Two main criticisms were directed against REBES. The first criticism relates to the system itself. The second criticism was directed against the general, systematic bias of the early expert systems in criminal investigation.

=== Deficiencies ===
There has been early credit for REBES; the system's experimental use was acclaimed to be especially a guidance to young officers. However, according to Richard W. Adderley the use was discontinued because of the following factors: "Reasons given include high turnover in users, new users disagreeing with the knowledge it contained, the volatility of the knowledge used [... and] the lack of integration with existing computer systems." Particularly strong criticism was voiced by the German communication scientist Jo Reichertz. First, he opposed the hypothesis of the developers of REBES that the system may serve as an example to other target crimes as burglaries are particularly easy to solve for investigators due to the perseverance degree that is shown by offenders. Second, he opposed the forensic approach as being simplistic.

=== The deficiencies of the early expert systems in law enforcement ===
Generally, the early 'expert systems' of the 1980s and 1990s were 'amateur systems' and prototypes. In order to simulate the human reasoning process, simplistic heuristics were used to re-formulate the investigative approach into programmed processes. For Jo Reichertz, the approach by the REBES developers misunderstood the cognitive methods used by burglary experts. Good investigation uses abduction than mere induction but the early expert systems could only produce results based on the entered data (knowledge base) and could not generate 'ideas' nor 'hypotheses'. The deficiencies of the early expert systems in law enforcement were one of the reasons that the main applications of AI in law enforcement are databases.

== See also ==
- Data mining
- ViCAP – Violent Criminal Apprehension Program
- HOLMES 2
