= Patrick Mullany =

FBI profiler and instructor (1935–2016)

Patrick Joseph Mullany
- Born: March 18, 1935; New York City, U.S.
- Died: September 7, 2016 (aged 81); Indian Wells, California, U.S.
- Occupation: FBI special agent

Academic work
- Institutions: Federal Bureau of Investigation (FBI)
- Notable works: Criminal profiling

Patrick Joseph Mullany (March 18, 1935 – September 7, 2016) was an American Federal Bureau of Investigation special agent and instructor at the FBI Academy. He is best known for pioneering the FBI's offender profiling in the 1970s and 1980s with fellow FBI instructor Howard Teten. Mullany received a master's degree in psychology and counseling from Manhattan College. He began working for the FBI in the mid-1960s. His primary position in the FBI was in the Behavioral Analysis Unit, where he embarked on his work in offender profiling. Mullany applied methods to analyze possible patterns of behavior and traits common in certain types of criminals. In doing this, the FBI can attempt to narrow down suspects and predict future likelihood of offending.

== Early life and education ==
Patrick was born March 18, 1935, in New York City. He started and completed a bachelor's degree in American history with a minor in British history, from Catholic University in Washington D.C. During this time he was also involved in an organization called the Christian Brothers. After receiving a bachelor's degree, he went on to complete a master's degree in counseling and psychology from Manhattan College in New York. Shortly after graduating, Mullany worked various jobs. During this time he started to become interested in the FBI through his sister. His sister had worked as a clerk for the FBI and her husband was an FBI agent. Persuasion by them and other acquaintances led him to apply for the FBI.

== Career in the FBI ==
After being accepted into the FBI, he went through 16 months of training to become a special agent. He ended up in Los Angeles after training and it is here that the FBI saw potential for him to teach. With an advanced degree in psychology, the training division offered him a position to become a faculty member. Mullany was then transferred back to New York and was part of the Behavioral Science Unit. It is here that Mullany along with Teten spearheaded much of the work done on the psychological aspects of criminal behavior. On top of the work done for the Behavioral Science Unit, he also co-initiated two other major police programs, the Hostage Negotiations and Criminal Psychological Profiling. His FBI career lasted in total from 1966 until 1986.

== Criminal profiling ==
In the early to late 1970s, Mullany and Teten spearheaded the behavioral science unit in Quantico, Virginia, using criminal psychology to create profiling techniques still used by the FBI today. Teten, being a criminologist, would present the facts of the case, and Mullany, having a master's degree in psychology, would connect the serial killer's personality to certain aspects of the crime scene. In the early stages of their work, there was some uncertainty with their methodology and how well their techniques worked. As they began to gain more confidence and momentum in what they were doing, and after a very significant case, their profiling techniques began to gain favor and become a more accepted practice within the FBI. While their original aim for these practices was to assist local law enforcement in serial killer and rape cases by narrowing leads and identifying suspects, through its eventual widespread use in such investigations, criminal profilers also began assisting in the prosecutions of said cases.

While success has emerged from the use of Mullany and Teten's methods, there has been many questions raised about their validity. The profiling methods used by the FBI are considered to be non-scientific and are usually compared to their scientific counterparts. Some noted limitations of non-scientific methods are the agents reliance on their personal intuition and professional knowledge and lack of clear, organized procedures. Criminal profiling and its admissibility in the courtroom for high-profile rape and murder cases has been also been disputed with varying opinions. While studies have been conducted on the use of criminal profiling and its effectiveness, there is insufficient empirical evidence to either confirm or deny the validity of the techniques and methodology created by Mullany and Teten.

== Later life ==
Late in his life, Mullany lived in Indian Wells, California, where he served on the city council between 2006 and 2014. He died of complications from a stroke on September 7, 2016.
