= Offender profiling =

Law enforcement investigative technique

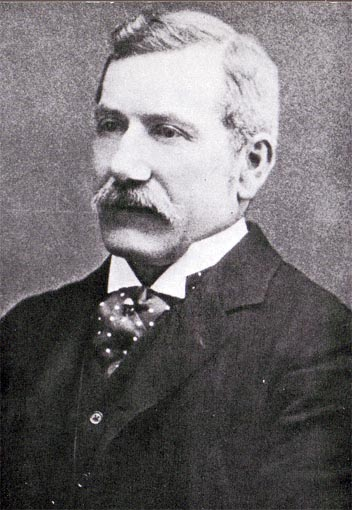
Thomas Bond (1841–1901), one of the precursors of offender profiling

Offender profiling, also known as criminal profiling, is an investigative strategy used by law enforcement agencies to identify likely suspects and has been used by investigators to link cases that may have been committed by the same perpetrator.

There are multiple approaches to offender profiling, including the FBI's typological method, geographic profiling, and investigative psychology, each utilizing different techniques to analyze offender behavior. Profiling is primarily applied in cases involving violent crimes such as serial murder, sexual offenses, and arson, where behavioral patterns may provide investigative leads.

Despite its use in law enforcement, offender profiling remains controversial, with critics arguing that it often lacks empirical validation, relies heavily on subjective interpretation, and may contribute to cognitive biases in criminal investigations. Advances in forensic psychology and data-driven methodologies continue to shape the field, integrating psychological theories with statistical analysis to improve reliability and accuracy.

The originator of modern profiling was FBI agent Robert Ressler. He defined profiling as the process of identifying all psychological characteristics of an individual and forming a general description of their personality based on an analysis of crimes they have committed.

== History ==
The earliest reference to the use of profiling, according to R.S. Feldman, is Quintilian's essay "Instruction to the Speaker", written in the 1st century AD. It included information about gestures used by people at that time. M. Woodworth and S. Porter believe that the first development on the topic of profiling that should be considered is the notorious Malleus Maleficarum ("Hammer of Witches"), written in the 15th century, since it contains psychological profiles of alleged witches.

There is also an opinion that the first "professional profiler", albeit a fictional one, was C. August Dupin, the protagonist of Edgar Allan Poe's short story The Murders in the Rue Morgue (1841), who constructed a psychological portrait of the killer. A factual work related to profiling with a scientific approach was Charles Darwin's book, The Expression of Emotions in humans and animals (1872). It contained only a description of external manifestations, but it was a systemization, and thus the beginning of a scientific study of the subject.

An Italian psychologist Cesare Lombroso (1835–1909) was a criminologist who attempted to formally classify criminals based on age, gender, physical characteristics, education, and geographic region. When comparing these similar characteristics, he better understood the origin of motivation of criminal behavior, and in 1876, he published the book The Criminal Man. Lombroso studied 383 Italian inmates. Based on his studies, he suggested that there were three types of criminals: born criminals, degenerate criminals and insane criminals who suffered from mental illness. Also, he studied and found specific physical characteristics; some examples included asymmetry of the face, eye defects and peculiarities, ears of unusual size, etc.

One of the first offender profiles was assembled by detectives of the Metropolitan Police on the personality of Jack the Ripper, a serial killer who had murdered a series of prostitutes in the 1880s. Police surgeon Thomas Bond was asked to give his opinion on the extent of the murderer's surgical skill and knowledge. Bond's assessment was based on his own examination of the most extensively mutilated victim and the post mortem notes from the four previous canonical murders. In his notes, dated November 10, 1888, Bond mentioned the sexual nature of the murders coupled with elements of apparent misogyny and rage. Bond also tried to reconstruct the murder and interpret the behavior pattern of the offender. Bond's basic profile included that "The murderer must have been a man of physical strength and great coolness and daring... subject to periodic attacks of homicidal and erotic mania. The characters of the mutilations indicate that the man may be in a condition sexually, that may be called Satyriasis."

In 1912, a psychologist in Lackawanna, New York delivered a lecture in which he analyzed the unknown murderer of a local boy named Joey Joseph, dubbed "The Postcard Killer" in the press.

In 1932, Dr. Dudley Schoenfeld gave the authorities his predictions about the personality of the kidnapper of the Lindbergh baby.

In 1943, at the request of the US Office of Strategic Services, psychiatrist Walter C. Langer developed a profile of Adolf Hitler that hypothesized the Nazi dictator's response to various scenarios, including losing World War II. After the war, British psychologist Lionel Haward, while working for the Royal Air Force police, drew up a list of characteristics that high-ranking war criminals might display. These characteristics were used to identify high-ranking war criminals amongst captured soldiers and airmen.

James Brussel was a psychiatrist who rose to fame after his profile of New York City's "Mad Bomber" George Metesky was published in the New York Times in 1956. The media dubbed him "The Sherlock Holmes of the Couch." In his 1968 book, Casebook of a Crime Psychiatrist, Brussel relates how he predicted that the bomber would wear a buttoned-up double-breasted suit, but removed the many incorrect predictions he had made in his profile, claiming he had successfully predicted that the bomber would be a Slav who lived in Connecticut, when in fact, he had actually predicted he would be "born and educated in Germany," and live in White Plains, New York. In 1964, Brussel profiled the Boston Strangler for the Boston Police Department.

=== Modern developments ===
Offender profiling was first introduced to the FBI in the 1960s, when several classes were taught to the American Society of Crime Laboratory Directors.

In 1972, after the death of J. Edgar Hoover, who was skeptical of psychiatry, the Behavioral Science Unit (BSU) of the FBI was formed by Patrick Mullany and Howard Teten in 1972, leading to the rapid development of the field. At the BSU, Robert Ressler and John Douglas began an informal series of ad hoc interviews with 36 convicts starting in early 1978.

The BSU later became the Behavioral Analysis Unit. It led to the establishment of the National Center for the Analysis of Violent Crime in 1984, of which the BAU is now a part, after Douglas and Ressler created a typology of sexually motivated violent offenders. The Violent Criminal Apprehension Program was launched in 1985.

The March 1980 issue of the FBI Law Enforcement Bulletin invited local police to request profiles from the FBI. An article in the April 1980 issue, "The Lust Murderer," introduced the dichotomy of "organized" and "disorganized" offenders. The August 1985 issue described a third, "mixed" category.

Investigations of serial killers Ted Bundy and Gary Ridgway were performed in 1984 by Robert Keppel and psychologist Richard Walter. They went on to develop the four subtypes of violent crime and the Hunter Integrated Telemetry System (HITS) database, which compiled characteristics of violent crime for research.

In 1985, Dr. David Canter in the United Kingdom profiled "Railway Rapists" John Duffy and David Mulcahy. David Canter assisted police detectives from the mid-1980s with an offender who had carried out a series of serious attacks, but Canter saw the limitations of offender profiling – in particular, the subjective, personal opinion of a psychologist. He and a colleague coined the term investigative psychology and began trying to approach the subject from what they saw as a more scientific point of view.

The Crime Classification Manual was published in 1992, and introduced the term "criminal investigative analysis."

There was little public knowledge of offender profiling until it was publicized on TV. Later, films based on the fictional works of author Thomas Harris caught the public eye as a profession, in particular Manhunter (1986) and Silence of the Lambs (1991).

== Theory ==
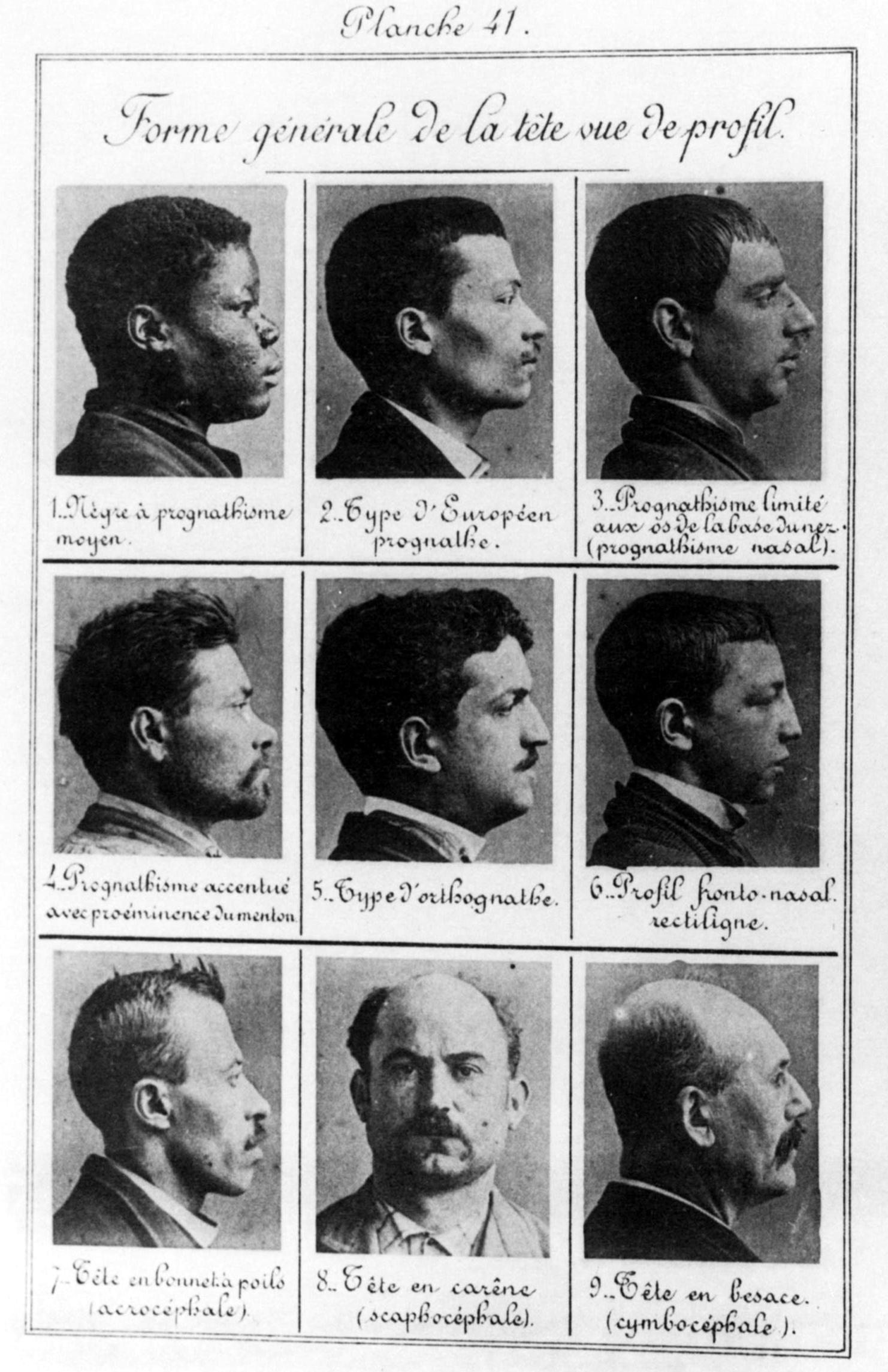
Criminal profiles from Alphonse Bertillon's (d. 1914) Identification anthropométrique (1893), showing "criminal types"

Psychological profiling is described as a method of suspect identification that seeks to identify a person's mental, emotional, and personality characteristics based on things done or left at the crime scene. There are two major assumptions made when it comes to offender profiling: behavioral consistency and homology. Behavior consistency is the idea that an offender's crimes will tend to be similar to one another. Homology is the idea that similar crimes are committed by similar offenders.

Fundamental assumptions that offender profiling relies upon, such as the homology assumption, have been proven outdated by advances in psychology and behavioral science. The majority of profiling approaches assume that behavior is primarily determined by personality, not situational factors, an assumption that psychological research has recognized as a mistake since the 1960s. Profilers have been noted to be very reluctant to participate in studies of profiling's accuracy. In a 2021 article it was noted that out of 243 cases, around 188 were solved with the help of criminal profiling.

A widely cited study by Mokros and Alison (2002) tested the homology assumption using a sample of convicted rapists and found no significant correlation between similarities in crime scene behavior and similarities in offender characteristics such as age, occupation, or criminal history. This research provided strong evidence that offenders with comparable behavioral patterns do not necessarily resemble one another in terms of psychological or demographic profiles. These findings increased doubt on the reliability of using crime scene behaviors to infer specific traits about an unknown offender, calling into question the scientific basis of many profiling practices.

== Criticism ==
As of 2021, although the practice of offender profiling is widely used, publicized and researched globally, there is a significant lack of empirical research or evidence to support the validity of psychological profiling in criminal investigations. Critics question the reliability, validity, and utility of criminal profiles generally provided in police investigations. Even over the years common criminal profiling methods have changed and been looked down upon due to weak definitions that differentiate the criminal's behaviors, assumptions and their psychodynamic process of the offender actions and characteristics that occur. In other words, this leads to poor and misleading profiles on offenders because they are based on opinions and decisions made up from one profiler conducting research on the offender. Research in 2007-2008 into profiling's effectiveness have prompted some researchers to label the practice as pseudoscientific. At the time, Canadian journalist Malcolm Gladwell, writing in The New Yorker, compared profiling to astrology and cold reading. Other critics described criminal profiling as an investigative tool hiding behind a lack of scientific evidence and support.

=== Lack of regulation ===
The profession of criminal profiling is unregulated. There is no governing body which determines who is and who is not qualified to be a criminal profiler, and therefore those who identify themselves as criminal profilers may range from someone with minimal experience to someone with extensive experience in the realm of criminal investigation. In addition to the lack of criteria as to what makes an expert in the field of criminal profiling, there is little empirical evidence supporting the accuracy of criminal profiling. There is an abundance of anecdotal support for criminal profiling, much of which originates from reports made by police officers and investigators regarding the performance of criminal profilers.

Law enforcement agents have been found to greatly support the use of criminal profiling, but studies have shown that detectives are poor profilers themselves. One study presented police officers with two different profiles for the same perpetrator, each of which varied greatly from the officers' own description. It was found that the officers were unable to determine whether one profile was more accurate than the other, and felt that all profiles accurately described the perpetrator. Officers were able to find truth in whichever profile they viewed, believing it accurately described the perpetrator, demonstrating the presence of the Barnum effect.

In addition, an investigator's judgement of the accuracy of a profile is impacted by the perceived source of the information; if the officer believes that the profile was written by an "expert" or "professional", they are likely to perceive it as more accurate than a profile written by someone who is identified as a consultant. This poses a genuine problem when considering that there are no true criteria which determine who may be considered a "professional" criminal profiler, and when considering that support for criminal profiling is largely based on the opinion of police officers.

== Typologies ==
The most routinely used typology in profiling is categorizing crime scenes, and by extension offender's personalities, as either "organized" or "disorganized". The idea of classifying crime scenes according to organized/disorganized dichotomy is credited to the FBI profiler Roy Hazelwood.

A typology of serial sexual homicides advocated by Robert Keppel and Richard Walter categorizes them as either power–assertive, power–reassurance, anger–retaliatory, or anger–excitation.

Criminal profiling can also be ex-ante or ex-post. Descriptive profiling of a perpetrator is a type of ex-post profiling, and can be used to prevent a serial killer from striking again.

Other profiling typologies have been developed over time, including distinctions based on motivation, method of attack, or psychological state. While typologies can provide investigators with a framework for understanding offender behavior, they are often based on clinical judgment and are not always supported by empirical research. Alternative approaches, such as Behavioral Evidence Analysis (BEA), focus on reconstructing the offender's actions and decision-making based on physical evidence, victimology, and crime scene dynamics, rather than relying on general typologies.

== Approaches ==
There are three leading approaches in the area of offender profiling: the criminal investigative approach, the clinical practitioner approach, and the scientific statistical approach. The criminal investigative approach is what is used by law enforcement and more specifically by the Behavioral Analysis Unit (BAU) within the FBI. The BAU "assists law enforcement agencies by their review and assessment of a criminal act, by interpreting the offender's behavior during the crime and the interactions between the offender and the victim during the commission of the crime and as expressed in the crime scene." The clinical practitioner approach focuses on looking at each case as unique, making the approach very individualistic.

One practitioner, Turco, believed that all violent crimes were a result of the mother-child struggle where female victims represent the offender's mother. This is also recognized as the psychodynamic approach. Another practitioner, Copson, outlined some principles for profiling that include being custom made, interactive and reflexive. By following these principles, the profile should include advice that is unique and not from a stereotype, should be easy to understand for all levels of intelligence, and all elements in the profile should influence one another. The Scientific approach relies heavily on the multivariate analysis of behaviors and any other information from the crime scene that could lead to the offender's characteristics or psychological processes. According to this approach, elements of the profile are developed by comparing the results of the analysis to those of previously caught offenders.

Wilson, Lincon and Kocsis list three main paradigms of profiling: diagnostic evaluation, crime scene analysis, and investigative psychology. Ainsworth identified four: clinical profiling (synonymous with diagnostic evaluation), typological profiling (synonymous with crime scene analysis), investigative psychology, and geographical profiling.

Five steps in profiling include:

1. Analyzing the criminal act and comparing it to similar crimes in the past.
2. An in-depth analysis of the actual crime scene.
3. Considering the victim's background and activities for possible motives and connections.
4. Considering other possible motives.
5. Developing a description of the possible offender that can be compared with previous cases.

One type of criminal profiling is referred to as linkage analysis. Gerard N. Labuschagne defines linkage analysis as "a form of behavioral analysis that is used to determine the possibility of a series of crimes as having been committed by one offender." Gathering many aspects of the offender's crime pattern such as modus operandi (MO), ritual or fantasy-based behaviors exhibited, and the signature of the offender, help to establish a basis for a linkage analysis. An offender's modus operandi is the habits or tendencies during the killing of the victim. An offender's signature is the unique similarities in each of the kills. Mainly, linkage analysis is used when physical evidence, such as DNA, cannot be collected.

Labuschagne states that in gathering and incorporating these aspects of the offender's crime pattern, investigators must engage in five assessment procedures:

1. Obtaining data from multiple sources.
2. Reviewing the data and identifying significant features of each crime across the series.
3. Classifying the significant features as either modus operandi or ritualistic.
4. Comparing the combination of modus operandi and ritual or fantasy-based features across the series to determine if a signature exists.
5. Compiling a written report highlighting the findings.

=== FBI method ===
There are six stages to developing a criminal profile: profiling inputs, decision process models, crime assessment, criminal profiling, investigation, and apprehension. The FBI and BAU tend to study specific categories of crimes such as white collar and serial murder.

== Popularity ==
Profiling has continuously gotten more accurate throughout the years. In 2008, only 42% of cases were solved using criminal profiling. In 2019 the FBI was able to solve 56% of the cases that were not solved back in the year 2008.

Profiling as an investigative tool has a high level of acceptance among both the general public and police.

In the United States, between 1971 and 1981, the FBI had only profiled cases on 192 occasions. By 1986, FBI profilers were requested in 600 investigations in a single year. By 1996, 12 FBI profilers were applying profiling to approximately 1,000 cases per year.

In the United Kingdom, 29 profilers provided 242 instances of profiling advice between 1981 and 1994; its usage increasing steadily over that period.

The usage of profiling has been documented in Sweden, Finland, New Zealand, South Africa, Germany, Canada, Ireland, Malaysia, Russia, Zimbabwe, and the Netherlands.

Surveys of police officers in the United States, the United Kingdom, and Canada have found that an overwhelming majority consider profiling to be useful. A 2007 meta-analysis of existing research into offender profiling noted that there was "a notable incongruity between [profiling's] lack of empirical foundation and the degree of support for the field."

Profiling's continued popularity has been speculatively attributed to broad use of anecdotes and testimonials, a focus on correct predictions over the number of incorrect ones, ambiguous profiles benefiting from the Barnum effect, and the popular appeal of the fantasy of a sleuth with deductive powers like Hercule Poirot and Sherlock Holmes.

According to the BAU, the probability of a profiler being used as "expert testimony" in court and leading to a guilty verdict is 85%. There is a difference between the hard sciences and the social sciences related to testimony and evidence in the courtroom. Some experts contend that offender profiling should not be used in court until such processes can be reliably validated, but as seen, it is still used successfully to this day.

== Notable profilers ==
Notable profilers include Roy Hazelwood, who profiled sexual predators; Ernst Gennat, a German criminologist, who developed an early profiling scheme for the police of Berlin; Walter Charles Langer, who predicted Hitler's behavior and eventual suicide, Howard Teten, who worked on the case of Martin Luther King Jr.'s assassination, and John E. Douglas, who worked on a wave of child murders in Atlanta in the 1980s.

One of the earliest documented cases of offender profiling was used during the investigation of the "Mad Bomber" in 1950s New York. Psychiatrist Dr. James A. Brussel created a detailed psychological profile of the unknown suspect, accurately predicting traits such as his age, mental health history, social isolation, and even his habit of wearing a double-breasted suit. Brussel's work helped to narrow the investigation and eventually led to the arrest of George Metesky in 1957, marking a pivotal moment in the development of modern criminal profiling.

== Research ==
In a review of the literature by Eastwood et al. (2006), one of the studies according to, Pinizzotto and Finkel (1990), showed that trained criminal profilers did not do any better than non-profilers in producing an accurate profile. A 2000 study also showed that profilers were not significantly better at creating a profile than any other participating groups.

A survey of statements made in offender profiles done for major cases from 1992 to 2001 found that "72% included repetition of the details of what occurred in the offence (factual statements already known by the police), references to the profiler's competence [...] or caveats about using the material in the investigation." Over 80% of the remaining statements, which made claims about the offender's characteristics, gave no justification for their conclusion.

A 2003 study that asked two different groups of police to rate how accurately a profile matched a description of the apprehended offender, with one group given a description of a completely fabricated offender instead of the real one, found that the profile was rated equally accurate in both cases.

There is a lack of clear, quantifiable evidence of a link between crime scene actions (A) and offender characteristics (C), a necessary supposition of the A to C paradigm proposed by Canter (1995). A 2002 review by Alison et al. concluded, "The notion that particular configurations of demographic features can be predicted from an assessment of particular configurations of specific behaviors occurring in short-term, highly traumatic situations seems an overly ambitious and unlikely possibility. Thus, until such inferential processes can be reliably verified, such claims should be treated with great caution in investigations and should be entirely excluded from consideration in court."

== See also ==
- Criminology
- Forensic profiling
- Forensic psychology
- Presumption of guilt
- Racial profiling
- Residential Burglary Expert System
- Statistical correlations of criminal activity
