= Howard Teten =

FBI Agent (1932–2021)

- Born: October 23, 1932; Nebraska City, Nebraska, U.S.
- Died: January 11, 2021 (aged 88)
- Education: University of California: Berkeley
- Occupation(s): FBI agent and instructor
- Years active: 1962–1986

Howard Duane Teten (October 23, 1932 – January 11, 2021) was an American Federal Bureau of Investigation agent and an instructor at the FBI Academy. While in the FBI, he worked in criminal profiling, also known as offender profiling with the help of Patrick Mullany. Teten and Mullany used this tool to attempt to identify unknown perpetrators. From the classes that Teten and Mullany taught at the FBI Academy, they helped form the Behavioral Health Science Unit and developed offender profiling, which is still used today.

== Early life ==
Howard Duane Teten was born on October 23, 1932, in Nebraska City, Nebraska. His father was a construction foreman, and the family moved several times during his childhood. Teten graduated from high school in Crofton, Nebraska, and joined the Marine Corps in 1950. While in the Corps, Teton was a photographer. He was discharged in 1954. After the Marine Corps, Teten started working part-time at a sheriff's department in Orange County, California. He started his college career at a junior college, originally studying biochemistry, but switched his major to criminalistics due to his contacts with the Southern California Criminal Laboratory. He transferred and graduated from the University of California at Berkeley. To help support his wife, who was working as a registered nurse, Teten started working street patrol in 1958 in San Leandro, California, where he was eventually promoted to the Crime Scene Investigations (CSI) unit.

== FBI career ==
In 1962, Teten joined the FBI. His job in the FBI required him to work in a number of locations. While working in the FBI, Teten was also going to school to earn his master's degree in social psychology. In 1969, he was transferred to the FBI headquarters in Washington D.C., where he began to teach. The first class that Teten taught was Applied Criminology where police officers would bring him unsolved cases and he would offer suggestions on those cases. When the teaching began to be too much for just one person to do, they brought in Patrick Mullany to help Teten teach. Together, Teten and Mullany developed criminal profiling to help them solve cases where the perpetrator was not known.

In 1972, the Behavioral Science Unit was formed where Mullany and Teten taught students how offender profiling worked and how to apply it to cases in the work. The first case to use Teten's profiling techniques was when seven-year-old Susan Jaegar had gone missing from her campsite while camping with her parents. Teten and Mullany worked the profile and the FBI was able to narrow down the suspect to David Meirhofer, who fit their profile. The FBI arrested Meierhofer and profiling became popular after this case.

From all of Teten's teaching, he began to have problems with his voice. He lost his voice completely and underwent surgery for a ruptured disc. After his surgery, Teten decided to make a change in his career and was promoted to unit chief of the Research and Development department in 1980 and remained there until 1986 when he decided to retire.

== After FBI ==
Teten retired from the FBI after twenty-four years in 1986. After his retirement, he started his own business of consulting for companies that had contracts for the government. He worked for the International Criminal Investigative Training Aid Program, which was mostly based in Caribbean countries.

Teten died from complications of COVID-19 on January 11, 2021, at the age of 88.
