= Roy Hazelwood =

FBI agent and pioneer of criminal profiling

Robert Roy Hazelwood
- Born: Robert Roy Hazelwood; March 4, 1938; Pocatello, Idaho, U.S.
- Died: April 18, 2016 (aged 78); United States
- Other name: Roy Hazelwood
- Occupations: FBI agent; criminal profiler; author
- Years active: 1971–1990s

Robert Roy Hazelwood (March 4, 1938 – April 18, 2016) was a former FBI profiler of sex crimes. He worked for much of his career for the FBI, retiring in the mid-1990s.

== Early life ==
Roy Hazelwood was born in Pocatello, Idaho. His parents were Elmo Earl (stepfather) and Louella Matilda (Schaible) Hazelwood. He had three siblings: half-brothers James Martin (Jim) and Gene Hazelwood, and half-sister Earlene Daniels. When he was an infant, his biological father, Myrle Reddick, kidnapped him and travelled with him for six months before returning the boy to his paternal grandparents; father and son never saw each other again. He was raised by his mother and stepfather in Spring Branch, Houston, Texas, and attended Sam Houston State University.

He joined the U.S. Army and served a tour in the Vietnam War in the military police, which he completed in 1968. He left the military after 11 years with the rank of Major. He followed his tour with a forensic medicine fellowship with the Armed Forces Institute of Pathology (AFIP) and a stint with the CID as an instructor.

He joined the FBI in 1971.

== Career ==
In 1980, he developed the distinction between "organized" and "disorganized" murderers, a concept that is still used by law enforcement to help apprehend criminals. He also defined the six categories of rapists: power-reassurance, power assertive, anger retaliatory, anger excitation, opportunistic and gang. Of the six, anger excitation is by far the most dangerous and the hardest to capture.

Hazelwood also offered the theory that there is no cure for pedophilia or sexual sadists. He has conducted numerous studies involving sex crimes, including cases of erotic asphyxiation. He did numerous studies involving the willing victims of sexual sadists (wives and girlfriends) and how sexual sadists appear in everyday life. In his career he found equivocal death crime as the most dubious and complex investigation to overcome.

Hazelwood, after he retired from the FBI, was an active member of the Academy Group, an organization of former FBI agents and law enforcement officers. He continued to work closely with the FBI and other government agencies in an effort to track down sexually oriented murderers. Hazelwood also co-authored two books with Stephen Michaud: The Evil That Men Do and Dark Dreams.

Hazelwood gave lectures across North America about sexual sadism and autoerotic fatalities. His presentation was also heavily focused on Dennis Rader, the "B.T.K." serial killer of Wichita, Kansas.

A fully endowed scholarship in memory of Roy Hazelwood is available for the master's degree in Criminal Justice Studies (Applied Criminology Concentration) at California University of Pennsylvania.

== Personal life ==
Hazelwood was a devout Presbyterian. He died peacefully while taking a nap in the sun at his home on April 18, 2016. He was buried with appropriate honors at Quantico National Cemetery. He is survived by a wife and three grown children.
