= Disorganized offender =

Classification of serial killer

Seal of the Federal Bureau of Investigation

In criminology, a disorganized offender is a type of serial killer classified by unorganized and spontaneous acts of violence. The distinction between "organized" and "disorganized" offenders was drawn by the American criminologist John Douglas and Roy Hazelwood. These profiles were also studied and modified in the FBI's Behavioral Science Unit located in Quantico, Virginia. By classifying these offenders into different categories, the FBI is able to track down offenders by studying their behavior and habits.

== Offender background ==
The disorganized offender usually originates from a turbulent family situation and has dealt with assault from family members growing up. They are also typically low-average or below-average intelligence. Their actions demonstrate poor work ethic and they are apt to be regularly fired or reprimanded at work. In the cases where a disorganized offender has a steady work ethic, they work blue collar jobs or jobs which require little or no use of reasoning. They are socially inadequate and possess little to no interpersonal skills. They limit their social interactions with others and tend to isolate themselves. Most disorganized offenders have never been married or in a serious relationship before. It is common that a disorganized offender may claim to be heterosexual, but evidence will usually suggest that their sexual relations align with paraphilia. Some disorganized offenders have exhibited homosexual tendencies, but in such cases, any homosexual contact they may have is usually a symbolic act of dominance or an offshoot of their paraphilia.

Disorganized offenders often have an innate fear or anxiety towards people, especially strangers, and they tend to live in a complex delusion that they have constructed in their mind. This delusion that they have created often leads them to commit acts of violence, both intentionally and unintentionally. Ed Gein, for example, exhumed the corpses of women that reminded him of his mother. He also consumed parts of them because he believed that he could preserve his mother's soul inside of his own body. He then created a "female suit" made of human flesh that he would wear when assuming his mother's identity. These offenders also commonly have obsessive thoughts and behave frantically, hence why the crime scenes for these offenders are messy.

== Habits and crime patterns ==
Disorganized offenders do not venture far from their homes when committing murders, as they often lack consistent traveling methods (such as a car). During the assault, disorganized offenders are usually not aware of their actions or the repercussions; they are caught up in the delusions they have deemed reality instead. They do not plan out who their victims will be, it is merely situational; they are either chosen at random or are people they know personally, and physical characteristics may not play an important role. The disorganized offender's actions are based mainly on spontaneity, which is why physical characteristics may not be as relevant to them in the moment. A common pattern found in disorganized crimes is that the victim is depersonalized as well. These individuals kill for the sole purpose of control and dominance, a trauma response to the abuse they faced at a younger age.

During the crime, the offender may be using drugs or alcohol. The murder is sadistic; the disorganized offender uses overkill. A disorganized offender may stab their victim repeatedly, even after death. They may also dismember or cut the body, including parts of the face. Because the crime is unplanned, the murder weapon is usually found near the scene and there are fingerprints or DNA left on scene as well. A common method used by disorganized offenders is the "blitz" attack, which is where the offender uses extreme force on the victim to gain control over them. They do not attempt to hide or conceal the crime; the body usually remains where the crime occurred.

== Interview techniques ==
The FBI has tracked a plethora of patterns for the disorganized offender, and has also compiled a list of interview techniques that will help the offender open up or confess. One particular strategy is connecting with the offender on a personal level. Creating a bond and having the interviewer highlight that they understand the offender will help them feel more comfortable in the situation. Disorganized offenders are not used to frequent social interactions, and therefore it is crucial to not immediately jump into the crime scene investigation and interrogation. Instead, approaching the situation in a roundabout way by discussing other events and then casually bringing up the main concern is another way to build trust. Taking an aggressive approach is not going to be successful in this scenario; trust is the key in this interaction and interviewers should aim to build a connection with the offender. Finally, it is noted that interviewing disorganized offenders during the nighttime is effective, mainly because most disorganized offenders prefer nighttime and this may open up communication easier than during the day.

== Well-known examples ==
Some examples of well-known disorganized offenders are Jack the Ripper (mentioned above), Richard Chase, and Herbert Mullin. All of these individuals have been studied, and the patterns arising from their actions and their backgrounds highlight that they are disorganized offenders.
