= Castro Valley, California =

Unincorporated community in California, United States

- CDP
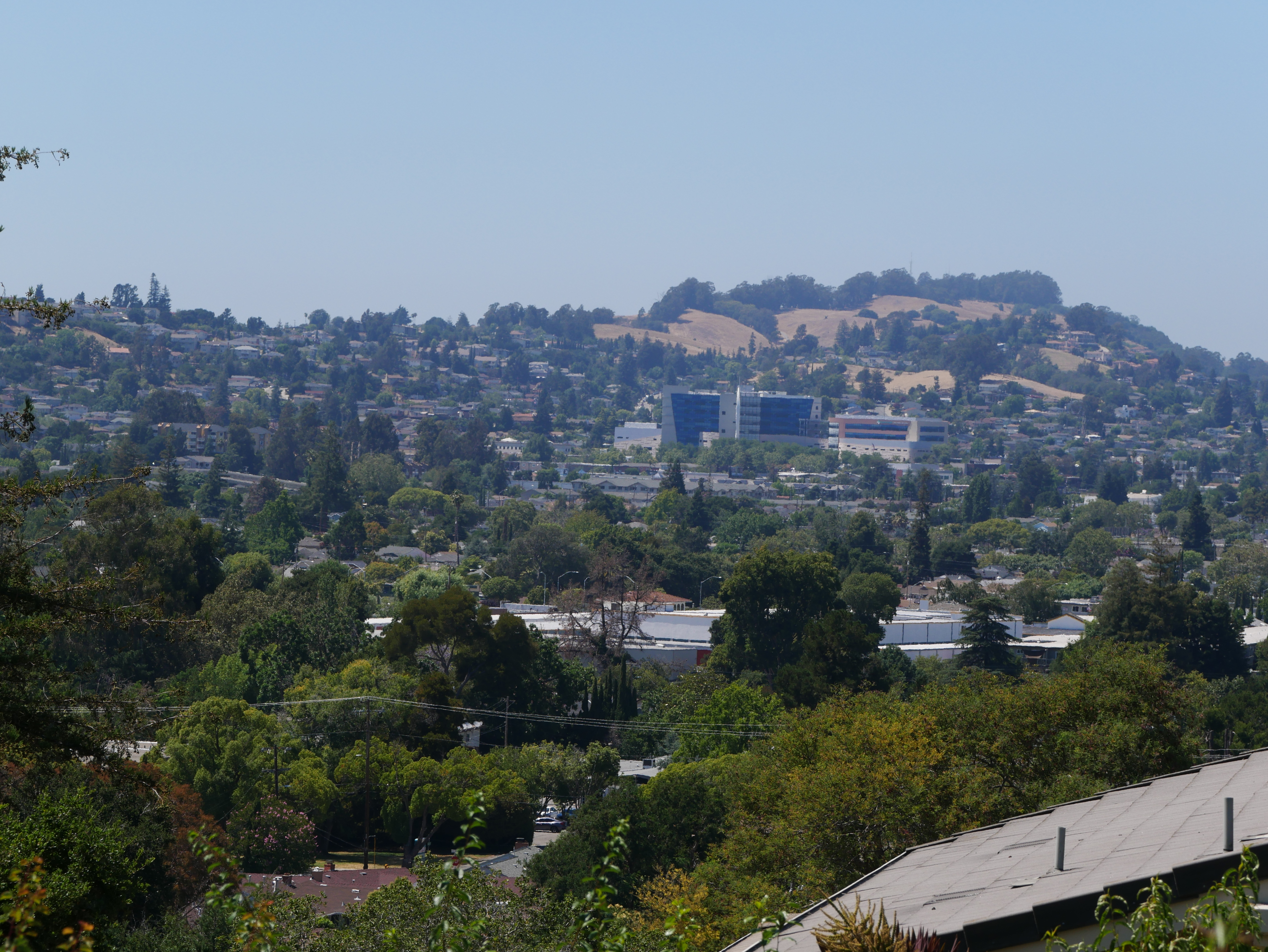
- Castro Valley, 2022
- Interactive map of Castro Valley, California
- Location in the San Francisco Bay Area Location in California Location in the United States
- Coordinates: 37°41′39″N 122°05′11″W
- Country: United States
- State: California
- County: Alameda
- Named for: Don Guillermo Castro

Government
  - State Senate: Tim Grayson (D)
  - State Assembly: Liz Ortega (D)
  - U. S. Congress: Aisha Wahab (D)

Area
  - Total: 17.07 sq mi (44.21 km^{2})
  - Land: 16.85 sq mi (43.64 km^{2})
  - Water: 0.22 sq mi (0.57 km^{2}) 1.68%
- Elevation: 161 ft (49 m)

Population (2020)
  - Total: 66,441
  - Density: 3,943.5/sq mi (1,522.58/km^{2})
- Time zone: UTC-8 (PST)
  - Summer (DST): UTC-7 (PDT)
- ZIP codes: 94546, 94552
- Area codes: 510, 341
- FIPS code: 06-11964
- GNIS feature IDs: 1658237, 2407987

Castro Valley is a census-designated place (CDP) in Alameda County, California, United States. At the 2020 census, it was the fourth most populous unincorporated area in California. The population was 66,441 at the 2020 census.

Castro Valley is named after Guillermo Castro, a noted 19th-century Mexican Californio ranchero who owned the land where the community is located.

== History ==
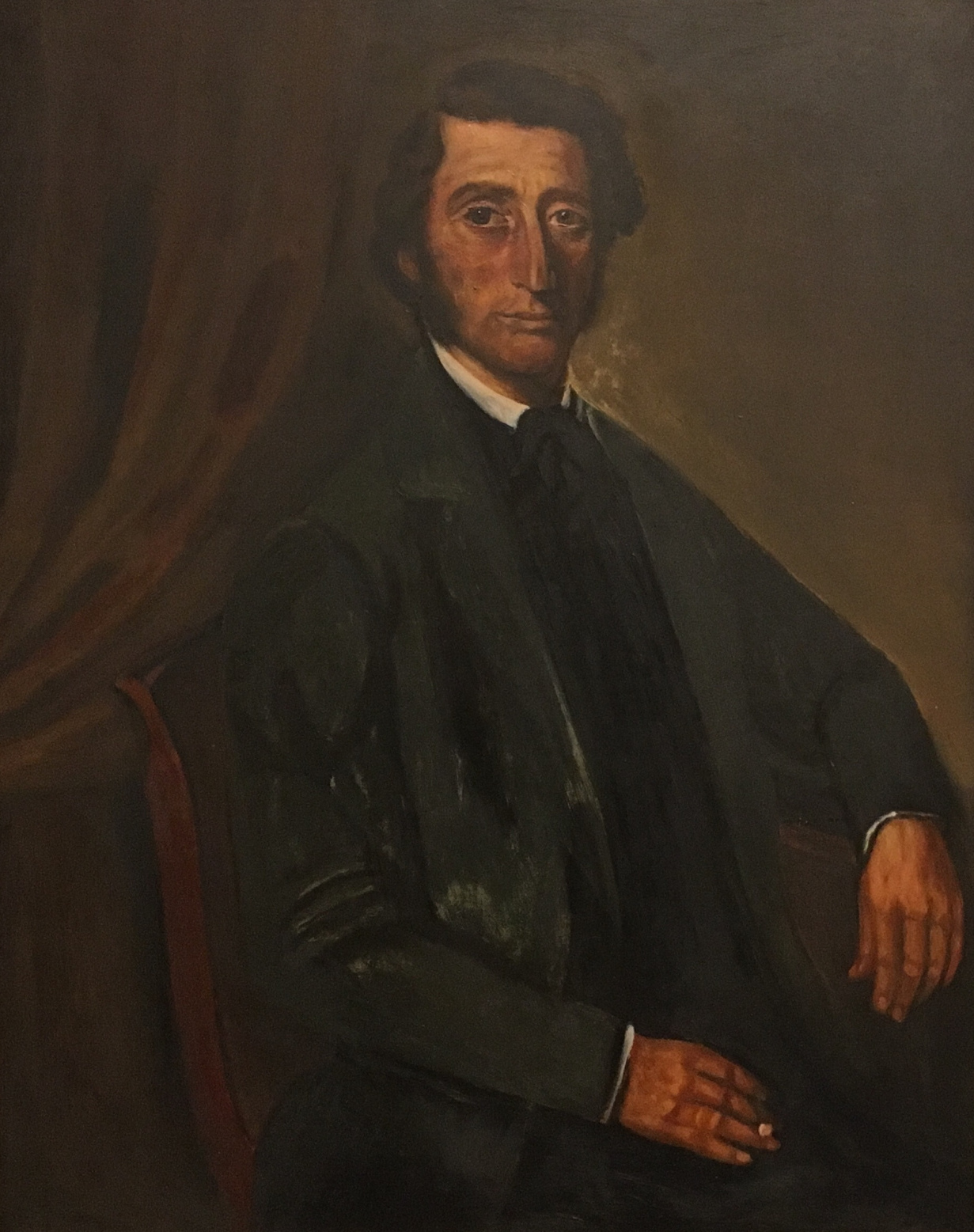
Castro Valley is named after Don Guillermo Castro, a noted Mexican Californio ranchero who owned much of the area.

Before the arrival of European settlers the area was settled by the Chocheño (also spelled Chochenyo or Chocenyo) subdivision of the Ohlone Native Americans.

With the arrival of Europeans, they established Mission San Jose in 1797. The area Castro Valley now occupies was part of the extensive colony of New Spain in what was the province of Alta California.

Castro Valley was part of the original 28,000 acre (110 km^{2}) land grant given to Castro in 1840, called Rancho San Lorenzo. This land grant included Hayward, San Lorenzo, and Castro Valley, including Crow Canyon, Cull Canyon, and Palomares Canyons. Castro had a gambling habit and had to sell off portions of his land to pay gambling debts. The last of his holding was sold in a sheriff's sale in 1864 to Faxon Atherton for $400,000.

Atherton (after whom the town of Atherton is named) in turn began selling off his portion in smaller parcels. Two men named Cull (the namesake of Cull Canyon) and Luce bought some 2,400 acres (10 km^{2}) and began running a steam-operated saw mill in Redwood Canyon. The Jensen brothers also bought land from Atherton in 1867.

In 1866, Redwood school was built, the first public school in the area. Many Portuguese families immigrated to the surrounding canyons (especially Palomares Canyon) and farmed large amounts of land, where their descendants remain today. In the 1870s, Lake Chabot, a reservoir and popular park, was built by Chinese laborers living at Camp Yema-Po. During the 1940s and 1950s, Castro Valley was known for its chicken ranches. Later it developed into a bedroom community, where workers live and commute to their jobs in the surrounding communities.

== Geography ==
Lake Chabot lies in the northwestern section of Castro Valley. Directly to the west is San Leandro. Hayward is to the south. Dublin, Pleasanton, and San Ramon are to the east.

The eastern hills of Castro Valley constitute the headwaters of the San Lorenzo Creek watershed and the origin of several creeks that flow into San Lorenzo Creek: Bolinas, Castro Valley, Chabot, Crow, Cull, Eden, Hollis, Kelly Canyon, Norris, and Palomares Creeks.

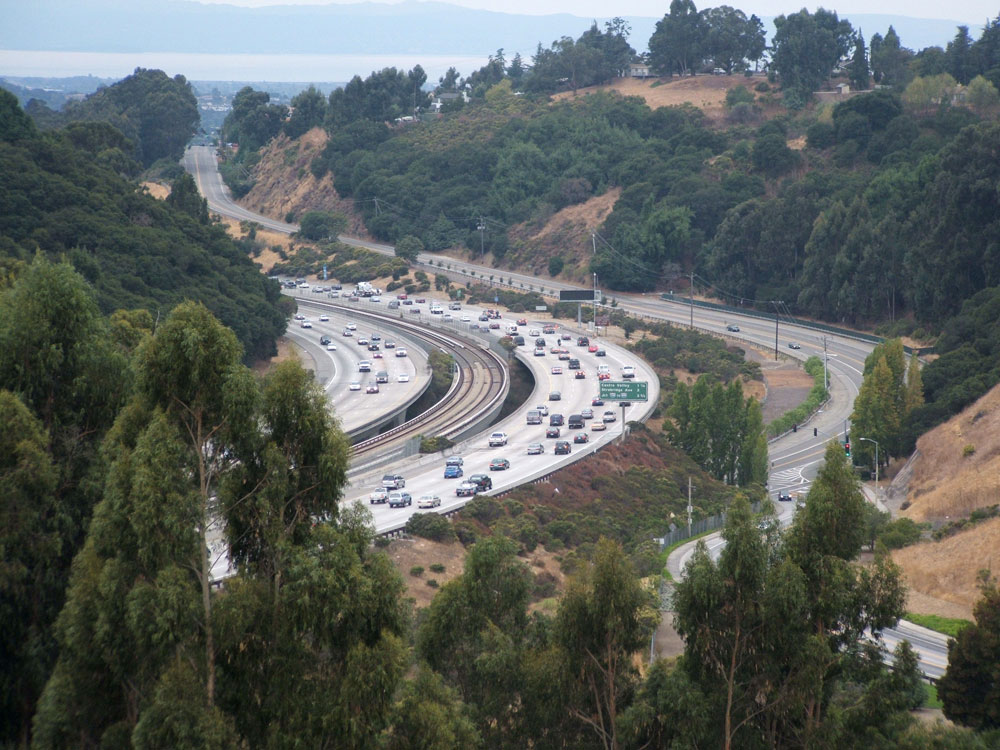
Interstate 580, with BART tracks in the center, near east Castro Valley

== Demographics ==
Historical population
Census	Pop.	Note	%±
1940	4,145		—
1960	37,120		—
1970	44,760		20.6%
1980	44,011		−1.7%
1990	48,619		10.5%
2000	57,292		17.8%
2010	61,388		7.1%
2020	66,441		8.2%
U.S. Decennial Census; 1860–1870 1880-1890; 1900 1910 1920; 1930 1940 1950; 1960 1970 1980; 1990 2000 2010; 2020

Castro Valley first appeared as an unincorporated community in the 1960 U.S. census; and as a census-designated place in the 1980 United States census.

=== Racial and ethnic composition ===
Castro Valley CDP, California – Racial and ethnic composition Note: the US Census treats Hispanic/Latino as an ethnic category. This table excludes Latinos from the racial categories and assigns them to a separate category. Hispanics/Latinos may be of any race.
Race / Ethnicity (NH = Non-Hispanic)	Pop 2000	Pop 2010	Pop 2020	% 2000	% 2010	% 2020
White alone (NH)	36,992	30,398	24,412	64.57%	49.52%	36.74%
Black or African American alone (NH)	2,868	4,064	3,993	5.01%	6.62%	6.01%
Native American or Alaska Native alone (NH)	205	160	141	0.36%	0.26%	0.21%
Asian alone (NH)	7,649	12,975	20,174	13.35%	21.14%	30.36%
Native Hawaiian or Pacific Islander alone (NH)	240	374	278	0.42%	0.61%	0.42%
Other race alone (NH)	154	148	454	0.27%	0.24%	0.68%
Mixed race or Multiracial (NH)	2,200	2,580	4,167	3.84%	4.20%	6.27%
Hispanic or Latino (any race)	6,984	10,689	12,822	12.19%	17.41%	19.30%
Total	57,292	61,388	66,441	100.00%	100.00%	100.00%

=== 2020 census ===
As of the 2020 census, Castro Valley had a population of 66,441 and a population density of 3,943.6 inhabitants per square mile (1,522.6/km^{2}). The census reported that 98.9% of residents lived in households, 0.3% lived in non-institutionalized group quarters, and 0.8% were institutionalized.

There were 23,218 households, of which 35.4% had children under the age of 18 living in them. Of all households, 56.1% were married-couple households, 5.9% were cohabiting couple households, 23.6% had a female householder with no partner present, and 14.4% had a male householder with no partner present. About 19.2% of all households were made up of individuals, and 9.4% had someone living alone who was 65 years of age or older. The average household size was 2.83. There were 17,369 families (74.8% of all households).

The age distribution was 21.5% under the age of 18, 7.5% aged 18 to 24, 26.3% aged 25 to 44, 27.8% aged 45 to 64, and 16.9% who were 65 years of age or older. The median age was 40.9 years. For every 100 females there were 94.5 males, and for every 100 females age 18 and over there were 92.1 males age 18 and over.

There were 23,941 housing units, of which 3.0% were vacant. Of the occupied units, 67.2% were owner-occupied and 32.8% were occupied by renters. The homeowner vacancy rate was 0.5% and the rental vacancy rate was 3.2%.

99.7% of residents lived in urban areas, while 0.3% lived in rural areas.

Racial composition as of the 2020 census
Race	Number	Percent
White	26,776	40.3%
Black or African American	4,233	6.4%
American Indian and Alaska Native	565	0.9%
Asian	20,443	30.8%
Native Hawaiian and Other Pacific Islander	335	0.5%
Some other race	5,316	8.0%
Two or more races	8,773	13.2%
Hispanic or Latino (of any race)	12,822	19.3%

=== 2023 American Community Survey ===
In 2023, the US Census Bureau estimated that 30.8% of the population were foreign-born. Of all people aged 5 or older, 58.5% spoke only English at home, 9.5% spoke Spanish, 5.9% spoke other Indo-European languages, 22.9% spoke Asian or Pacific Islander languages, and 3.2% spoke other languages.

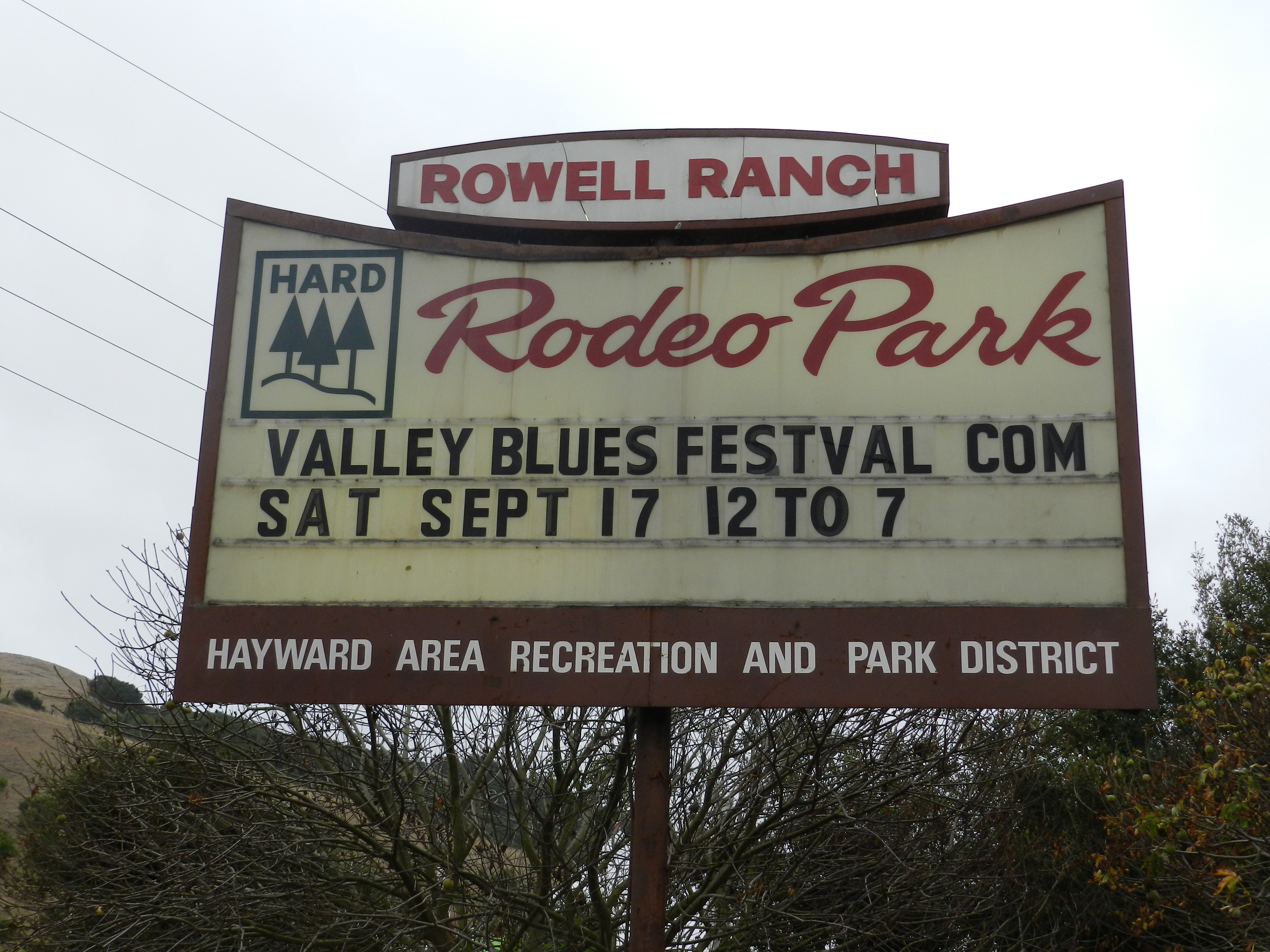
Rowell Rodeo Park

== Economy ==
The economy of Castro Valley consists largely of the provision of goods and services for local residents. Being a primarily residential community, only about 5% of the area has been developed for commercial uses.

The greatest number of people (6,683) are employed by the health care and social assistance industry, followed by the retail trade industry with 1,073 employees and accommodation and food service with 1,044 employees. The health care and social assistance industry provided $1.1 billion in sales, shipments, receipts or revenue in 2012, which is the highest of all industries, and it is followed by the retail trade industry, which had a value of $324.1 million in sales, shipments, receipts or revenue.

The median household income of residents was $138,069 in 2023, compared to a median income of $126,240 for all of Alameda County. The per capita income was $58,843, compared to $63,442 in all of Alameda County. The poverty rate was 7.5%, compared to 9.2% in all of Alameda County.

== Art and culture ==
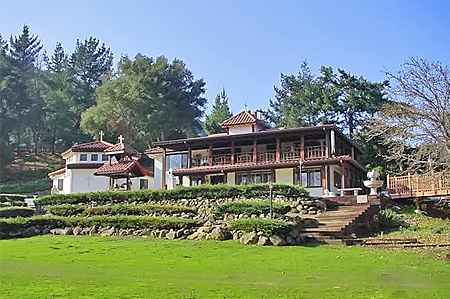
Holy Cross Orthodox Monastery

Castro Valley is one of the sites where Joseph Eichler built some of the 10,000 or so homes he built in the Bay Area. Castro Valley has a one-screen movie theater, the Chabot Cinema. The Castro Village complex on Castro Valley Boulevard is widely considered the commercial center of town. The Harry Rowell Rodeo Ranch is located in Castro Valley and is managed by the Hayward Area Recreation and Park District. Rodeos are held there regularly.

=== Historical landmarks and museums ===
Site of the first public school in Castro Valley
- Interactive map of Site of the first public school in Castro Valley
- 37.7067°N 122.073983°W
- Location: 19200 Redwood Rd., Castro Valley, California

California Historical Landmark
- Reference no.: 776

==== First public school in Castro Valley ====
The first public school in Castro Valley is a designated California Historical Landmark. A plaque is placed at the original site. The one-room schoolhouse was donated for "educational purposes only," by Josiah Grover Brickell in 1866. Brickell provided the salary for the first teacher. During the day the teacher taught children and in the evening they taught farmhands. The school burned down in 1901. It was rebuilt and burned down again in 1920. A new school was built on another property.

==== Adobe Art Gallery ====
The Adobe Art Gallery is a program operated by the Hayward Area Recreation and Park District promoting the visual arts and uses the Adobe building, built as a Works Progress Administration project in 1936.

== Law and government ==
Castro Valley is an unincorporated community and thus is governed directly by the County of Alameda. There is no city police force, with policing provided by the Alameda County Sheriff's Office and the California Highway Patrol. Most of the community has fire protection provided by the Alameda County Fire Department, while the Five Canyons neighborhood has fire protection provided by the Fairview Fire Protection District. Castro Valley Sanitary District provides refuse and sewer collection services for the majority of the community, with wastewater processed at the Oro Loma Wastewater Treatment Plant in San Lorenzo.

Efforts to incorporate Castro Valley have been voted down by its residents at the polls in both 1956 and 2002. In lieu of a city council, Castro Valley is represented by a seven-member Municipal Advisory Council, which is an advisory body appointed to advise the Alameda County Board of Supervisors on local issues.

== Education ==
According to the 2019–2023 American Community Survey, educational attainment for Castro Valley residents at least 25 years old is 90.4% high school graduate and 43.9% bachelor's degree.

=== Public schools ===
Castro Valley is primarily served by the Castro Valley Unified School District, though portions of it are served by the Hayward Unified School District (South of I-580 and West of Grove Way) and the San Lorenzo Unified School District (westernmost part). Overall, the Castro Valley Unified School District serves more than 9,000 students.

The main high school is Castro Valley High School with over 2,700 students. Castro Valley also has Redwood High School, an alternative high school with approximately 118 students in 2023.

- Castro Valley has two public middle schools: Canyon Middle School and Creekside Middle School.
- Castro Valley has nine public elementary schools: Castro Valley, Chabot, Independent, Jensen Ranch, Marshall, Palomares, Proctor, Stanton, and Vannoy.

The school district includes the Castro Valley Adult School.

=== Private schools ===
There is also a Roman Catholic school, called Our Lady of Grace (K–8), which is part of the Roman Catholic Diocese of Oakland. Redwood Christian Schools has one elementary school (K–5) Redwood Christian Elementary.

== Transportation ==
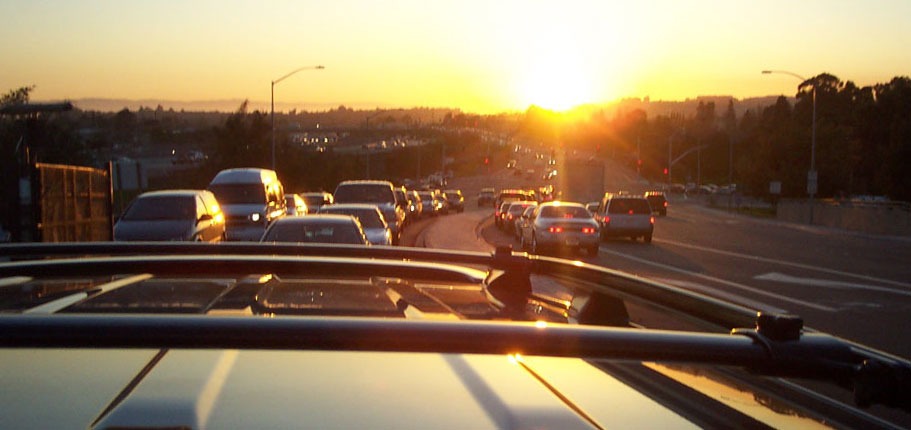
Castro Valley traffic

Interstate 580, which approaches from the east, makes a turn northward at Castro Valley. Interstate 238, which originates in Castro Valley, connects I-580 to Interstate 880. In addition to being served by those two freeways, Castro Valley is served with public transportation by bus system AC Transit, and rapid transit system BART with a station.

The primary local east–west arterial road is Castro Valley Boulevard, while Lake Chabot Road, Redwood Road and Crow Canyon Road are the major north–south arterials.

Historically, Castro Valley Boulevard was part of the first transcontinental highway system, the Lincoln Highway.

Through BART, Castro Valley has links to all three of the San Francisco Bay Area's major commercial airports, though the closest by distance is Oakland International Airport.

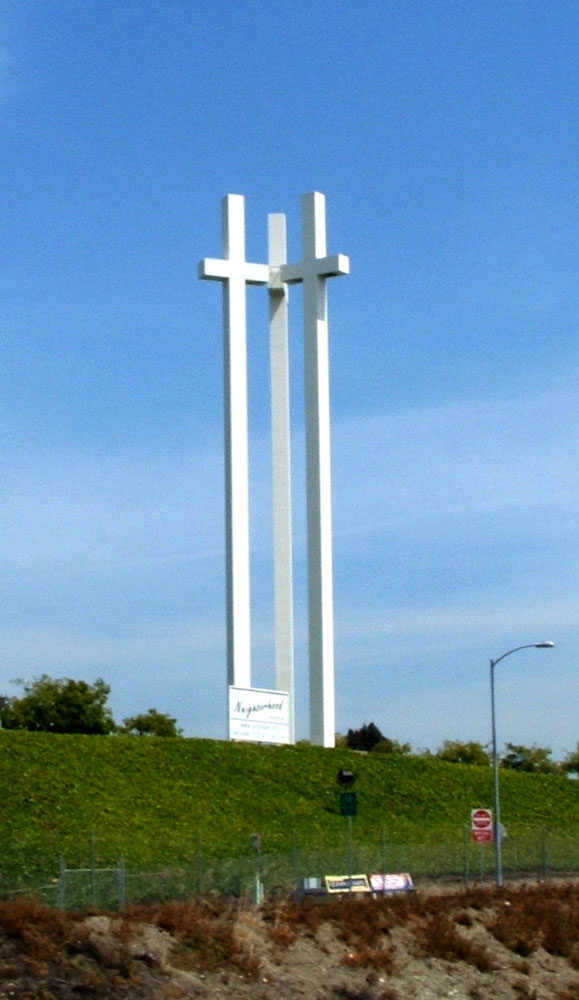
The three crosses of the Neighborhood Church form a prominent local landmark.

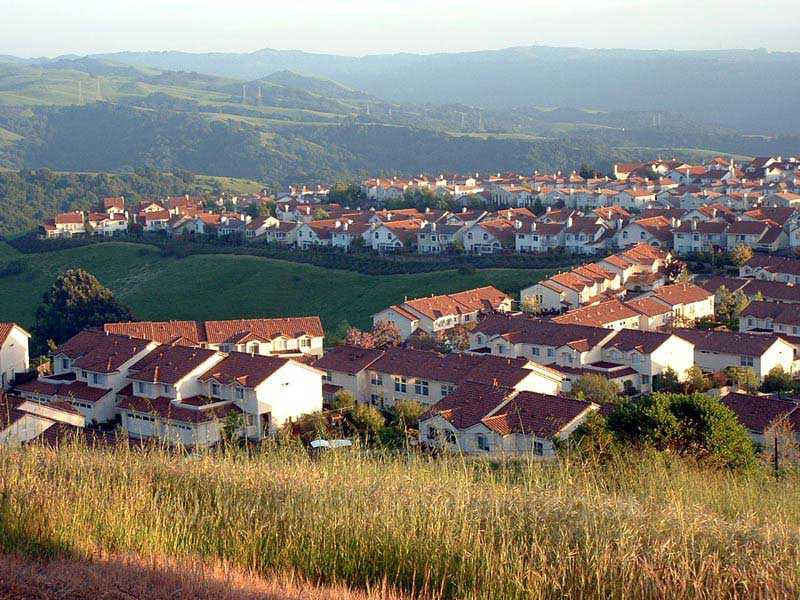
Palomares Hills (on the east side of Castro Valley) looking south toward Palomares Canyon

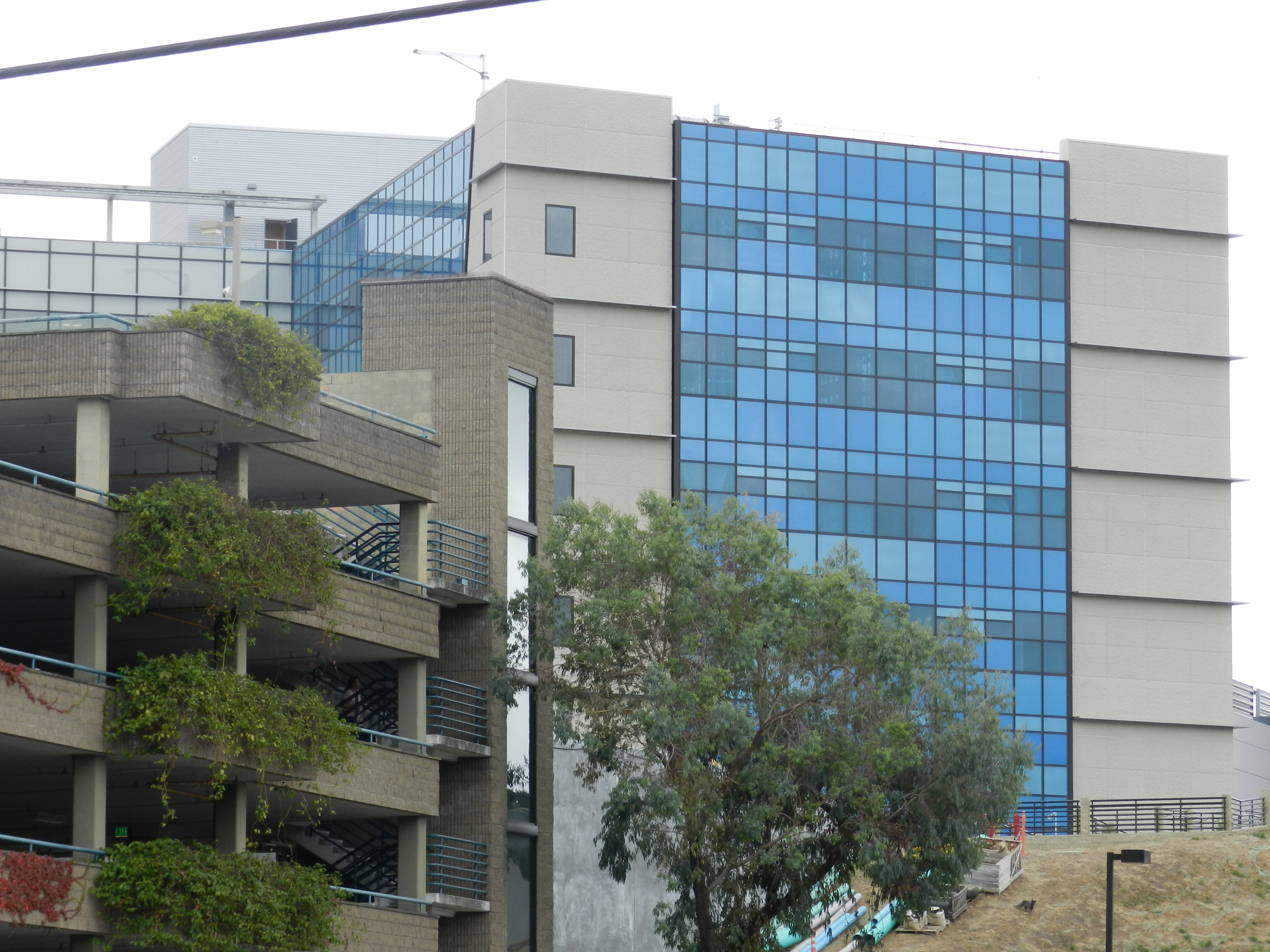
Eden Medical Center

== Services ==
Eden Medical Center operates in Castro Valley. It is a Sutter Health facility, and provides basic emergency medical services for the area. Castro Valley Sanitary District runs wastewater treatment facilities, and was selected as California's best small wastewater system in 2002 and 2018.

== Notable people ==
- Christopher Andersen, journalist, former editor of Time and People magazines, No. 1 New York Times bestselling author
- Mac Barnett, author
- Amy Berg, television writer and producer
- David Bingham, soccer player
- Mike Bordin, co-founder and drummer of Faith No More, as well as drummer for Black Sabbath, Korn and Ozzy Osbourne, attended Castro Valley High School
- Lilan Bowden, actress, comedian, and filmmaker.
- Brodie Brazil, Emmy Award-winning reporter for Comcast SportsNet Bay Area/Comcast SportsNet California and San Jose Sharks sideline reporter
- Darren Brazil, editor for Comcast SportsNet Bay Area
- Cliff Burton (1962 - 1986), former bassist of Metallica, attended Castro Valley High School
- Jason Castro, Major League Baseball catcher for the Los Angeles Angels of Anaheim, born in Castro Valley
- Frank Cepollina, engineer
- Sarah Clatterbuck, computer engineer.
- Tim Davis, football coach
- Jack Del Rio, former head coach of NFL's Oakland Raiders, born in Castro Valley
- Val Diamond of Beach Blanket Babylon
- Garret Dillahunt, actor, No Country For Old Men, born in Castro Valley
- Craig Ferguson, Canadian ice hockey player
- Gregg Field, musician and producer
- Kyle Gass, musician, actor
- Mary Hayashi, Former California State Assembly Member
- Dean Heller, former U.S. Senator
- Sebastian Janikowski, Polish-born football placekicker for Oakland Raiders, current resident
- Brian Keyser, Major League Baseball player
- Kris LaPoint, professional water skier
- Nick Lima, professional soccer player, born in Castro Valley
- Luenell, actress and comedian
- Kevin Maas, Major League Baseball player
- Rachel Maddow, anchor and political analyst on MSNBC's The Rachel Maddow Show and The Rachel Maddow Show on Air America Radio.
- "Big" Jim Martin, former guitar player for Faith No More
- Alec Nevala-Lee, novelist and science-fiction writer
- Miranda Nild, soccer player for Thailand women's national team; born in Castro Valley
- Psyclon Nine, aggrotech and industrial metal group
- Ed Sprague Jr., Major League Baseball player, 2-time World Series champion; born in Castro Valley
- Jim and Jennifer Stolpa, whose story was featured in the film Snowbound: The Jim and Jennifer Stolpa Story
- Greg Tabor, Major League Baseball player
- Christopher Titus, comedian
- Casey Wellman, professional ice hockey player
