= Rancho San Lorenzo (Castro) =

Mexican land grant in California

- Former Land Grant
- Etymology: Good view
- Interactive map of Rancho San Lorenzo
- Coordinates: 37.691°N 122.093°W
- Country: United States
- State: California
- County: Alameda
- Land Grant Established: 1841
- Founder: Guillermo Castro

Area
  - Total: 26,722 acres (10,814 ha)
- Time zone: UTC−08:00 (Pacific)
  - Summer (DST): UTC−07:00 (Pacific Daylight Time)

Rancho San Lorenzo was a 26,722-acre (108.14 km^{2}) Mexican land grant given in 1841 by Governor Juan Alvarado to Guillermo Castro a career soldier posted to the Pueblo of San José. The land grant included present day Hayward, San Lorenzo, and Castro Valley, including Crow Canyon, Cull Canyon, and Palomares Canyons.

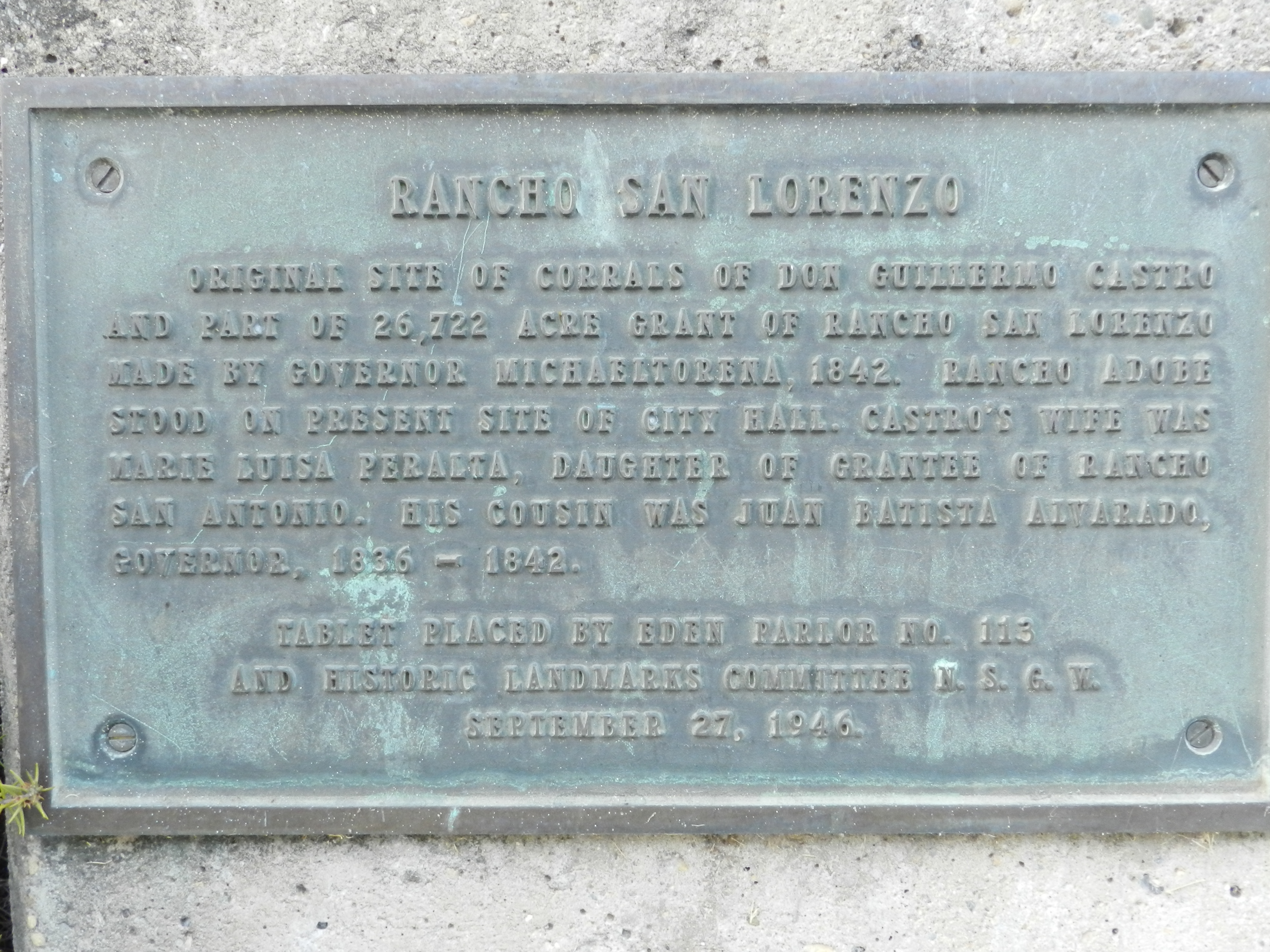
plaque outside the original Hayward City Hall building, at Alex Giualini Plaza

== History ==
The grant was located on the route of El Camino Viejo.

With the cession of California to the United States following the Mexican-American War, the 1848 Treaty of Guadalupe Hidalgo provided that the land grants would be honored. As required by the Land Act of 1851, a claim for Rancho San Lorenzo was filed with the Public Land Commission in 1852, and the grant was patented to Guillermo Castro in 1865.

Soon after, Castro began to sell off his land to pay debts. The last of his holding was sold in a sheriff's sale in 1864 to Faxon Atherton. Atherton in turn began selling off his portion in smaller parcels.

== Rancho San Lorenzo (Sota) ==
Guillermo and Maria Louisa Peralta Castro owned Rancho San Lorenzo Alta. Francisco and Barbara Soto owned an adjacent rancho called Rancho San Lorenzo Baja - sometimes called San Lorenzito, or Little San Lorenzo. Barbara Soto was Guillermo Castro's sister. Soto's grant was patented at 6,686 acres (27 km^{2}) in 1877.

== See also ==
- Ranchos of Alameda County, California
