= Castro Valley High School =

Location
- 19400 Santa Maria Avenue; Castro Valley, Alameda County, California 94546; United States; 37°42′13.22″N 122°4′41.79″W

Information
- Type: Public high school
- Established: 1956
- School district: Castro Valley Unified School District
- Principal: Christopher Fortenberry
- Teaching staff: 121.81 (FTE)
- Enrollment: 2,874 (2024-2025)
- Student to teacher ratio: 23.59
- Colors: Green and gold
- Mascot: Trojan
- Newspaper: The Olympian
- Yearbook: Palladium
- Website: cvhs.cv.k12.ca.us

Castro Valley High School is located in the unincorporated suburban community of Castro Valley, California, United States. It is a high school for grades 9 to 12. Named a National Exemplary School in 1984–85 and 1988–89, it was a California Distinguished School in 1987–88, 2000–01, and 2009.

It is part of the Castro Valley Unified School District.

== Academics ==
CVHS ranks 1901st in high schools in America, 275th in California, and 49th in the San Francisco Metro Area. 49% of students have taken at least one Advanced Placement exam, and 41% of students passed at least one AP exam. The graduation rate is 97%.

As a comprehensive high school, Castro Valley High School provides a wide variety of course offerings, including advanced, honors, and Advanced Placement courses.

== Demographics ==
Student enrollment in the 2023–2024 school year was approximately 2,842 students. Their ethnic makeup was:

- 30.5% Asian
- 25.4% Hispanic/Latino
- 22.8% White
- 9.7% Two or more races
- 4.8% African American
- 4.3% Filipino
- 0.2% Native Hawaiian/Pacific Islander
- 0.1% American Indian or Alaska Native
- 2.1% Not reported

== Notable alumni ==
- Jeff Beal, composer
- Amy Berg, TV writer and producer
- Mike Bordin, drummer for Faith No More
- Lilan Bowden, comedian, actress and filmmaker
- Brodie Brazil, reporter for Comcast SportsNet Bay Area/Comcast SportsNet California; San Jose Sharks sideline reporter
- Darren Brazil, editor, brother of Brodie
- Cliff Burton, bassist for Metallica
- Jason Castro, former MLB catcher
- Randall William Cook, film visual effects artist
- Val Diamond, stage performer; starred in Beach Blanket Babylon in San Francisco, 1979-2009; Class of 1969
- Ryan Fleck, movie director and screenwriter; Class of 1994.
- Dale R. Herspring, political scientist
- Bob LaPoint, professional water skier; Class of 1973
- Kris LaPoint, professional water skier; Class of 1971.
- Luenell, actress in Borat: Cultural Learnings of America for Make Benefit Glorious Nation of Kazakhstan
- Rachel Maddow, political commentator and television journalist; host of MSNBC's The Rachel Maddow Show
- Jim Martin, former guitarist for Faith No More
- Mark Mastrov, founder of 24 Hour Fitness; partial owner of NBA's Sacramento Kings; Class of c. 1980
- Lourdes Pangelinan, first female director-general of the Secretariat of the Pacific Community.
- Jonas Rivera, film producer
- Rick Rodriguez, former professional baseball player
- Marty Schmidt, mountain climber and guide
- Juan Toscano-Anderson, small forward for the Golden State Warriors
- Brad Wellman, MLB player 1982–1989
- Kalin White, Musician from former hip-hop and pop duo Kalin and Myles
