= End of the Rainbow =

2005 musical by Peter Quilter

- Original language: English
- Written by: Peter Quilter
- Characters: Judy Garland; Anthony; Mickey Deans; Concierge; Stage Manager; BBC Announcer
- Subject: The last months of Judy Garland's life
- Genre: Drama / Musical
- Setting: London, December 1968

Premiere
- Date: 2005
- Place: Sydney Opera House; Sydney, Australia

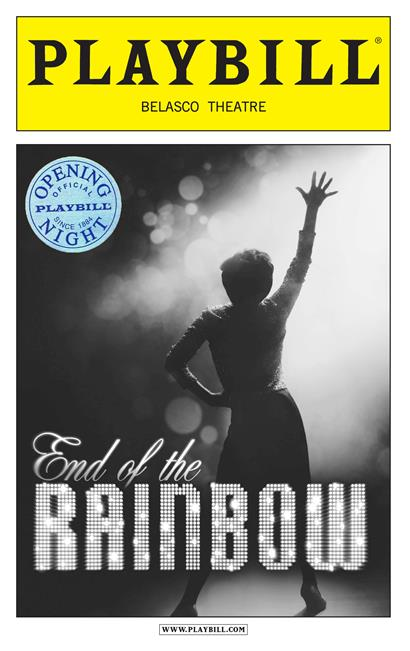
Playbill for End of the Rainbow on Broadway

End of the Rainbow is a musical drama by Peter Quilter, which focuses on Judy Garland in the months leading up to her death in 1969. After a premiere in Sydney, Australia in 2005, the show has played on the West End in London and a Broadway production opened at the Belasco Theatre in 2012. The award-winning 2019 film Judy starring Renée Zellweger is a screen adaptation of the play for which Zellweger won the Academy Award for Best Actress.

== Synopsis ==
Judy Garland is staying in London, along with young new fiancé Mickey Deans and loyal friend and pianist Anthony, preparing for her five-week run of shows at The Talk of the Town. Garland hopes that her act will help her maintain her star profile, especially considering a recent string of bad press against her. However, she still struggles with both her drug addictions and her strained relationships with the men around her.

== Production history ==
End of the Rainbow evolved from an earlier Peter Quilter play entitled Last Song of the Nightingale which had starred Tracie Bennett as a fictitious past-her-prime diva: premièring as a London fringe production in the spring of 2001, Last Song... had encored (with Bennett) in 2003 at the Edinburgh Fringe Festival and also Off West End. Although Quilter would state the play's protagonist was a gender-switch on an alcoholic male cruise ship performer of the playwright's acquaintance, Last Song... would be viewed by theater-goers and critics - and its star Tracie Bennett - as a theatrical Judy Garland roman à clef: Quilter eventually decided to revise his original play to overtly focus on Garland, with the resultant End of the Rainbow premièring in August 2005 at the Sydney Opera House in Australia with Caroline O’Connor as Garland, a role O'Connor reprised first in a May 2006 production at the Theatre Royal, Sydney and then at the Edinburgh Fringe Festival engagement of End of the Rainbow in August 2006. O'Connor won three Best Actress awards for her performances.

End of the Rainbow was then performed from February 5–20, 2010 at Northampton's Royal & Derngate Theatre. This production was directed by Terry Johnson and starred Tracie Bennett as Judy Garland, with Hilton McRae as Anthony and Stephen Hagan as Mickey Deans. End of the Rainbow ran in the West End from 16 November 2010 to 21 May 2011 at Trafalgar Studios, starring Tracie Bennett. The West End production received nominations for four Olivier Awards, including Best Actress for Bennett, Best Actor in a Supporting Role for McRae and Best New Play. The show then toured in the UK from 25 August and ending in December 2011 at Richmond Theatre. .

End of the Rainbow had its American premiere at the Guthrie Theater in Minneapolis, running from January 28 to March 11, 2012. Directed by Terry Johnson, Tracie Bennett repeated her role as Garland. The play opened on Broadway at the Belasco Theatre on March 19, 2012 in previews and officially on April 2. In addition to Bennett, the cast featured Michael Cumpsty as Anthony, Tom Pelphrey as Mickey Deans, and Jay Russell. Bennett and Cumpsty received Tony Award nominations for their performances. Bennett also received the Outer Critics Circle Award and Drama Desk Award for Outstanding Actress in a Play. The show ran 176 performances on Broadway and subsequently played a critically acclaimed season at the Ahmanson Theatre in Los Angeles.

- End of the Rainbow toured the UK for a second time in 2016, with Lisa Maxwell in the role of Judy Garland.

End of the Rainbow (Al final del arcoíris) premiered in Madrid, January 2011, at the Teatro Marquina with Natalia Dicenta as Judy Garland, Miguel Rellán as Anthony and Javier Mora as Mickey Deans.

- End of the Rainbow (O Fim do Arco-Íris) (pt) had its Portuguese première in Lisbon in January 2012 at the Teatro Politeama in Lisbon. The cast was led by Vanessa Silva as Judy Garland with Carlos Quintas as Mickey Deans and Hugo Rendas as Sidney Luft.
- The show was presented in Brazil on 11 November 2012 at the Fashion Mall shopping center's entertainment court in Brasília, DF with Cláudia Netto as Judy and Igor Rickli as Mickey Deans.
- End of the Rainbow (Al final del arcoíris) was premièred in Buenos Aires, Argentina, on 5 February 2014, starring Karina K as Garland, Antonio Grimau and Federico Amador as Mickey Deans.
- The show had its Canadian première in April 2015 at the Compagnie Jean Duceppe Theatre in Montreal. In the same year, the show had a second run in Los Angeles, playing at the International City Theatre.

End of the Rainbow (El final del arcoíris) was premièred in Mexico City on 29 May 2015, at the Foro Cultural Coyoacanense Hugo Argüelles, with Alejandra Desiderio starring as Judy Garland, José Antonio López Tercero as Anthony and Mario Sepúlveda as Mickey Deans directed by Rosa Alicia Delain and is a production of Re-Crea Teatro under the supervision of Alis Ortega and Fernanda Prado. There was a revival at Foro Shakespeare in 2016 and another revival at Teatro Rafael Solana in 2018.

- In 2015, the show had a new production in Tokyo Japan, which was revived in 2016.
- In December 2016, the show had a new production in Moscow, Russia. The show also returned to Rome for a 2nd run, at the Teatro Sistina.
- Ace Productions presented a new Canadian production in Vancouver in April 2017.
- The Berlin production returned to the Schlosspark Theater for a second run in September 2017.
- The play returned to Los Angeles in 2017 for a run at the La Mirada Theatre. In summer 2018 it played its 4th LA run at Laguna Playhouse.
- In 2019 The State Theatre Company of South Australia commemorated the 50th Anniversary of Garland's passing. As part of the Adelaide Cabaret Festival, this production of End Of The Rainbow was directed by Elena Carapetis and starred Helen Dallimore as Judy, Nic English as Micky, Stephen Sheehan as Anthony; it concluded its run on June 22, 2019.
- In December 2025 a production of the play was produced at JCC CenterStage in rochester, New York, with jasmin Singer as the lead.

=== Leading actresses ===
There have been productions of the show in Brisbane, Melbourne, Adelaide, Auckland, Florence, Amsterdam, Berlin, Hamburg, Copenhagen, Kraków, Prague, Sofia, Rotterdam and Helsinki. New productions played in the 2013–14 season in Christchurch, Rome, Klagenfurt, Miami, Atlanta, Denver and Milwaukee.

- The 2014 Milwaukee Repertory Theatre production of End of the Rainbow starred Hollis Resnik as Garland.
- Kathy St. George played Garland in the 2014 Actors' Playhouse production of End of the Rainbow at the Miracle Theatre in Miami.
- Anna Gangai appeared as Garland in End of the Rainbow at the Cellar Theatre at San Antonio's The Playhouse in 2014.
- Jeannie Shubitz played Garland in a production of End of the Rainbow that opened at the Phoenix Theatre in Phoenix, Arizona in May 2015.
- Leisa Way portrayed Garland in a summer stock production in Bobcaygeon, Ontario, Canada in July, 2015.
- Eileen Bowman portrayed Garland in End of the Rainbow in San Diego in November 2015.
- Natasha Drena played Judy Garland in End of the Rainbow in January, 2016 at the Kavinoky Theatre in Buffalo. Drena previously performed the role in Atlanta in 2014, winning a Best Actress at this city's local theatre awards.
- Carolyn Johnson played Garland in End of the Rainbow in March/April, 2016 at Stages Repertory Theatre in Houston, Texas.
- Janelle Lutz played Garland in the Uptown Players' production of End of The Rainbow in Dallas, Texas in April, 2016, .
- In November 2016, Porchlight Music Theatre presented the Chicago premiere of the production with Angela Ingersoll as Judy Garland.
- Melissa Minyard played Garland in the FreeFall theatre production of the play in St. Petersburg, Florida in 2017.
- The role of Judy Garland was performed by Angela Ingersoll in a production at the Grandel Theater in St. Louis.2017.
- Helen Dallimore stars as Judy Garland in the State Theatre Company of South Australia 2019 production.
- In 2019, Judy, a film adaptation of End of the Rainbow, starred Renée Zellweger.
- Jinkx Monsoon played the role of Judy Garland in a new production of the musical in 2026 at Soho Theatre Walthamstow.

== Musical numbers ==
- "I Can't Give You Anything but Love, Baby"
- "Just in Time"
- "For Me and My Gal"
- "You Made Me Love You (I Didn't Want to Do It)"
- "The Trolley Song"
- "The Man That Got Away"
- "When You're Smiling"
- "Come Rain or Come Shine"
- "Over the Rainbow"
- "Get Happy"
- "By Myself"

== Recording ==
End of the Rainbow

Studio album by Tracie Bennett
- Released: January 31, 2011
- Genre: Showtunes

A cast recording of the London production was released on January 31, 2011 by Angel Recording Studios featuring Tracie Bennett's renditions of both the play's songs and other Garland numbers.

=== Track listing ===
All tracks performed by Tracie Bennett, unless noted.

No.	Title	Length
1.	"I Can't Give You Anything but Love / Just in Time" (Medley)
2.	"I Could Go On Singing"
3.	"Smile"
4.	"For Me and My Gal / You Made Me Love You / The Trolley Song" (Medley)
5.	"Zing! Went the Strings of My Heart"
6.	"The Man That Got Away"
7.	"Come Rain or Come Shine"
8.	"When You're Smiling"
9.	"Somewhere Over the Rainbow"
10.	"San Francisco"
11.	"When the Sun Comes Out"
12.	"Get Happy / By Myself" (Medley)
13.	"Somewhere Over the Rainbow" (Piano solo by Simon Lee)

== Awards and nominations ==
4 Olivier Award nominations in London's West End in 2011 - Best New Play, Best Actress, Best Sound, and Best Supporting Actor.

=== Original Broadway production ===
Year	Award ceremony	Category	Nominee	Result
2012	Tony Award	Best Actress in a Play	Tracie Bennett	Nominated
2012	Tony Award	Best Featured Actor in a Play	Michael Cumpsty	Nominated
2012	Tony Award	Best Sound Design of a Play	Gareth Owen	Nominated
2012	Drama Desk Award	Outstanding Actress in a Play	Tracie Bennett	Won
2012	Outer Critics Circle Award	Outstanding Actress in a Play	Tracie Bennett	Won
