= Eden Medical Center =

Coordinates: 37°41′54″N 122°5′24″W

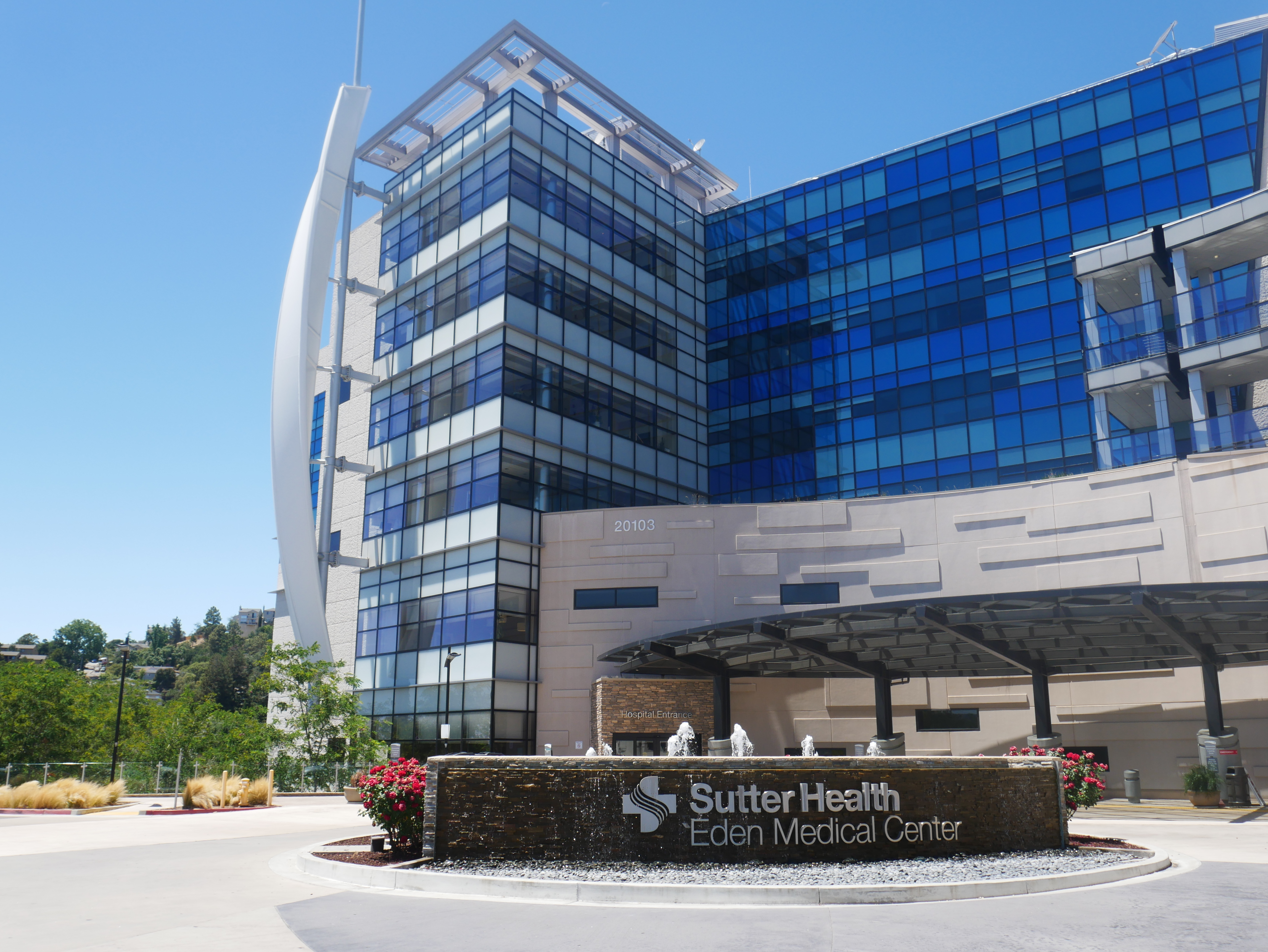
Eden Medical Center in 2022

Eden Medical Center is a hospital and medical center located in Castro Valley, California, United States, providing emergency medical services to Alameda County. It is operated by Sutter Health. It is built on an elevated area, and is visible from a distance.

== History ==
The first hospital was built in 1954. The complex saw a major rebuild in the early 21st century. The new facility has been noted for its innovations in structural engineering and energy efficiency.
