= Castro Valley Unified School District =

School district in California, United States

- 4400 Alma Ave. Castro Valley, California

District information
- Type: Public
- Superintendent: Nia Rashidchi
- Schools: Elementary 9, Middle 2, High 2
- NCES District ID: 0607800

Students and staff
- Students: 9,358
- Teachers: 452
- Staff: 532

The Castro Valley Unified School District (CVUSD) is located in Castro Valley, California, United States. It is a public preschool through adult school district. Overall, the district contains almost 9,000 students. It was created in 1965.

The district serves the majority of Castro Valley and portions of Ashland, Dublin, Fairview, Hayward and Sunol.

The Castro Valley Unified School District consists of the following schools:

== Elementary schools (K-5) ==
- Castro Valley Elementary School
- Chabot Elementary School
- Independent Elementary School
- Jensen Ranch Elementary School
- Marshall Elementary School
- Palomares Elementary School
- Proctor Elementary School
- Stanton Elementary School
- Vannoy Elementary School

== Middle schools (6-8) ==
- Canyon Middle School
- Creekside Middle School

== High schools (9-12) ==
- Castro Valley High School - has over 2,900 students

Redwood High School

Location
- 18400 Clifton Way; Castro Valley, California; United States
- Coordinates: 37°42′48″N 122°05′33″W

Information
- Type: Public high school
- Faculty: 7.46 (on FTE basis)
- Grades: 9 to 12
- Enrollment: 118 (2023-2024)
- Student to teacher ratio: 15.82
- Website: www.cv.k12.ca.us/redwood

- Redwood High School - an alternative/continuation public high school in Castro Valley, California, United States. Redwood High School was remodeled from 2006 to 2008. High school with approximately 193 students in 2005

== Adult school ==
- Castro Valley Adult School
