= Eileen Bowman =

American actress (born 1966)

- Born: Eileen Josephine Bowman; May 8, 1966 (age 60); La Mesa, California, U.S.
- Other names: Eileen Sylwestrzak, Eileen Bowman Sylwestrzak
- Education: St. Martin's Catholic School
- Occupation: Actress
- Known for: Snow White portrayals at 61st Academy Awards and Beach Blanket Babylon
- Notable credits: Guys and Dolls; End of the Rainbow; Looped
- Spouse: Marc Sylwestrzak
- Parent: John Bowman (father)
- Awards: 2012 Craig Noel Award for Outstanding Lead Performance in a Musical, Female

Eileen Josephine Bowman Sylwestrzak (born May 8, 1966) is an American actress who performed as Snow White at the 61st Academy Awards and Beach Blanket Babylon. Bowman starred in productions of End of the Rainbow (2015), Hairspray (2018), Looped (2024) and she won a Craig Noel Award for Outstanding Lead Performance in a Musical, Female for Guys and Dolls (2012).

== Personal life ==
Bowman was born May 8, 1966, in La Mesa, California. She is one of three girls fathered by John Bowman, a former teacher at Ramona High School. Bowman lived in Lakeside, California and attended St. Martin's Catholic grade school. She first portrayed Snow White at San Diego Junior Theatre. Bowman later married actor Marc Sylwestrzak.

== Career ==
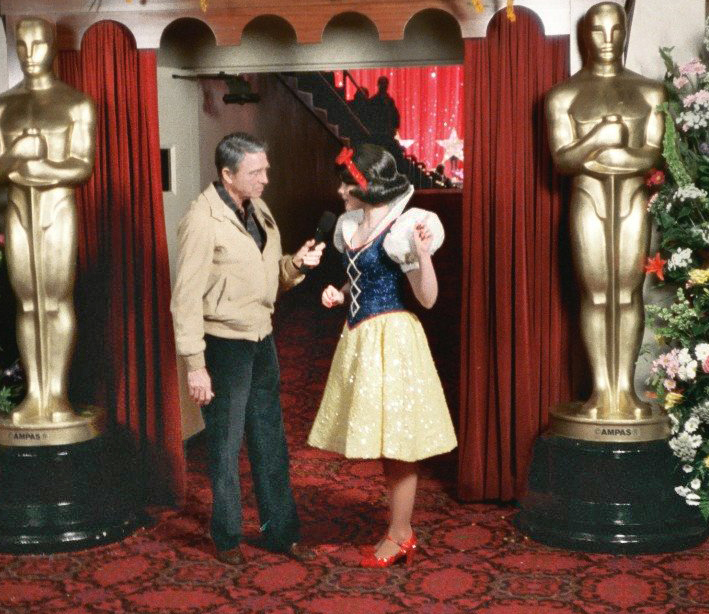
Army Archerd rehearsing with Bowman at Shrine Auditorium before the 61st Academy Awards

Bowman's professional acting debut happened when she was 12 at the Old Globe Theatre.

In 1989, Bowman was cast as Snow White by Steve Silver for the Beach Blanket Babylon in Las Vegas. Silver requested Bowman to audition for the character in the opening performance of the 61st Academy Awards. According to the Los Angeles Times, Bowman won the part against Pia Zadora, Lorna Luft, Ellen Greene, and Lucy Arnaz but the San Francisco Chronicle reported they all declined the role. She went on to perform alongside Rob Lowe at the event. Bowman later stated her professional career suffered following the performance, not discussing details until a 2013 interview with The Hollywood Reporter. Bowman reunited with Lowe in 2018 when Lowe was doing a show at the Balboa Theatre.

In 1991, Bowman was cast in a production of Tales of Tinseltown in San Diego. In the 2010s, she starred in several San Diego productions.

== Filmography ==
Year	Title	Role	Notes
1989	61st Academy Awards	Snow White	
1991	Writer's Block	Young Woman	
1992	Killer Tomatoes Eat France	Tour Guide	
1995	Top Dog	Female Detective	
1996	Silk Stalkings	Valet	Episode: "Family Values"
1996	Renegade	Jenny / Desk Clerk	2 episodes
1997	K9.5: The Howlywood Premiere	Voice	
1998	Pensacola: Wings of Gold	Bank Teller	Episode: "Game, Set and Match"
2017	The Fabulous Allan Carr	Self	
2019	Inside Edition	Self	Episode: "Snow White Oscars' Moment"
2025	San Diego Film Awards	Self	Co-hosted with spouse
2025	Daddy Help! Mommy's in Prison!	Edith Baron	ReelShort series
2025	The Boy I Hate	Mrs. Montgomery	ReelShort series
2025	Pregnant by My Ex's Professor Dad	Dean Hearst	ReelShort series

== Stage credits ==
Year	Title	Role	Location	Notes
1977	Bye Bye Birdie		Parkway Junior High School, La Mesa, California	
1978	The Enchanted	Young girl	Cassius Carter Center Stage, Balboa Park, San Diego	
1984	The Great Pretender	Shana	Old Town Opera House	
1991	Tales of Tinseltown	Ellie Ash	Hahn Cosmopolitan, Downtown San Diego	
1992	Dames at Sea	Ruby	Welk Resorts Theatre, Escondido, California	
1992	Rockn' 50's		Springs Theatre, Palm Springs Convention Center	
1993	Reunion		Hahn Cosmopolitan, Downtown San Diego	
1994	Animal Crackers		Welk Resorts Theatre, Escondido, California	
1995	Singin' in the Rain		Welk Resorts Theatre, Escondido, California	
1996	Mame	Agnes Gooch	Welk Resorts Theatre, Escondido, California	
1997	The Importance of Being Earnest	Cecily	Vantage Theatre, La Jolla, California	
1997	The Music Man	Marian	Starlight Musical Theatre, Balboa Park, San Diego	
1997	Singin' in the Rain	Lina	Starlight Musical Theatre, Balboa Park, San Diego	
1998	Brigadoon	Fiona	Starlight Musical Theatre, Balboa Park, San Diego	
1998	A Little Night Music	Anne	Casa del Prado Theatre, Balboa Park, San Diego	
1999	My Fair Lady	Eliza Doolittle	Starlight Musical Theatre, Balboa Park, San Diego	
1999	How the Grinch Stole Christmas		Old Globe Theatre	
2000	How the Grinch Stole Christmas		Old Globe Theatre	
2003	How the Grinch Stole Christmas	Grandma Who	Old Globe Theatre	
2005	How the Grinch Stole Christmas		Old Globe Theatre	
2007	How the Grinch Stole Christmas	Grandma Who	Old Globe Theatre	
2008	How the Grinch Stole Christmas	Grandma Who	Old Globe Theatre	
2009	Ruthless!	Judy Denmark	Broadway Theatre, Vista, California	
2009	How the Grinch Stole Christmas	Grandma Who	Old Globe Theatre	
2010	Footloose	Ethel	Welk Resorts Theatre, Escondido, California	
2010	How the Grinch Stole Christmas	Grandma Who	Old Globe Theatre	
2011	Spring Awakening		Coronado Performing Arts Center, Coronado, California	
2011	Barbra's Wedding	Molly Schiff	Broadway Theatre, Vista, California	By Daniel Stern
2011	Mame	Agnes Gooch	Stephen and Mary Birch North Park Theatre, North Park, San Diego	
2012	2 Across: A Comedy of Crosswords and Romance	Janet	Broadway Theatre, Vista, California	By Jerry Mayer, co-starred with spouse
2012	Guys and Dolls	Adalaide	Lamb's Players Theatre, Coronado, California	
2012	Joe Versus the Volcano	DeDe	Lamb's Players Theatre, Coronado, California	
2013	Pete 'n' Keely	Keely	Lamb's Players Theatre, Coronado, California	
2013	Company	Amy	Cygnet Theatre Company	
2013	Hairspray	Velma Von Tussle	Welk Resorts Theatre, Escondido, California	
2013	How the Grinch Stole Christmas	Grandma Who	Old Globe Theatre	
2014	The Odd Couple	Cecily Pigeon	Welk Resorts Theatre, Escondido, California	
2014	Ruthless!	Judy Denmark / Ginger Del Marco	The Moss Theatre at New Roads School, Santa Monica, California	
2015	You Can't Take It with You	Gay Wellington / Olga Katrina	Lamb's Players Theatre, Coronado, California	
2015	End of the Rainbow	Judy Garland	Intrepid Theatre, Encinitas, California	
2016	The Addams Family: A New Musical	Alice Beineke	Moonlight Amphitheatre, Vista, California	
2016	The Doyle and Debbie Show	Debbie	Broadway Theatre, Vista, California	
2016	Ruthless!	Judy Denmark	Moxie Theatre, San Diego	
2017	On the 20th Century	Mildred Plotka / Lily Garland	Cygnet Theatre Company	
2018	Hairspray	Velma Von Tussle	Horton Grand Theatre, San Diego	
2019	Menopause The Musical	Soap Star	Welk Resorts Theatre, Escondido, California	
2019	Road Show		Off Broadway Live, Santee, California	
2020	Alice	Red Queen	Lamb's Players Theatre, Coronado, California	
2021	Mrs. Bob Cratchit's Wild Christmas Binge	Mrs. Emily Cratchit	Moxie Theatre, San Diego	
2022	Nunsense	Sister Mary Amnesia	Welk Resorts Theatre, Escondido, California	
2022	Cinderella	Madame	Moonlight Amphitheatre, Vista, California	
2022	A Christmas Carol	Various	Cygnet Theatre Company	
2023	A Christmas Carol	Mrs. Emily Cratchit	Cygnet Theatre Company	
2024	Tootsie	Rita Marshall	Moonlight Amphitheatre, Vista, California	
2024	Looped	Tallulah Bankhead	The Roustabouts at the Legler Benbough Theatre, Alliant International University	
2024	A Christmas Carol	Mrs. Emily Cratchit	Cygnet Theatre Company	
2025	Vanya and Sonia and Masha and Spike	Masha	Cygnet Theatre Company	
2025	A Christmas Carol	Mrs. Emily Cratchit	Joseph Clayes III Theater in The Joan, Liberty Station, San Diego	

== Accolades ==
Festival / Event	Year	Title	Award	Result	Notes	Ref.
San Diego Critics Circle	2012	Guys and Dolls	Craig Noel Award for Outstanding Lead Performance in a Musical, Female	Won		
San Diego Critics Circle	2013	Pete 'n' Keely	Craig Noel Award for Outstanding Lead Performance in a Musical, Female	Nominated		
San Diego Critics Circle	2025	Looped	Craig Noel Award for Outstanding Lead Performance in a Play	Nominated		
National Academy of Television Arts and Sciences	2026	2025 San Diego Film Awards	Pacific Southwest Emmy Award – Program Host / Moderator / Correspondent	Won	Shared with Marc Sylwestrzak	
