= Sarah Clatterbuck =

American engineer

Sarah Clatterbuck is an American engineer who was selected as one of "The World's Top 50 Women in Tech 2018" by the magazine Forbes. She has worked in management positions at a number of technology companies, and is an advocate for disability-friendly product design and global development of the tech economy.

== Early life and education ==
Clatterbuck was born in Castro Valley, California. She studied applied design at the University of San Francisco and later earned a master's degree in information science from San José State University.

== Career ==
Clatterbuck was an engineering manager at Yahoo! before joining LinkedIn in 2012, where she held the role of Director of Engineering, Application Infrastructure, Women in Tech & Accessibility.

In April 2018, she joined YouTube to work on alternative monetization. She advocates for "building products to serve people with physical or cognitive challenges" and to bring more women into technology.

== Awards ==
- 2017: She was selected by Business Insider as part of "The 43 most powerful female engineers of 2017"
- 2018: She was selected as one of The World's Top 50 Women in Tech 2018 and America's Top 50 Women in Tech 2018 by Forbes magazine.
