= Holden Street Theatres =

Theatre in Adelaide, South Australia

- All Saints' Anglican Church
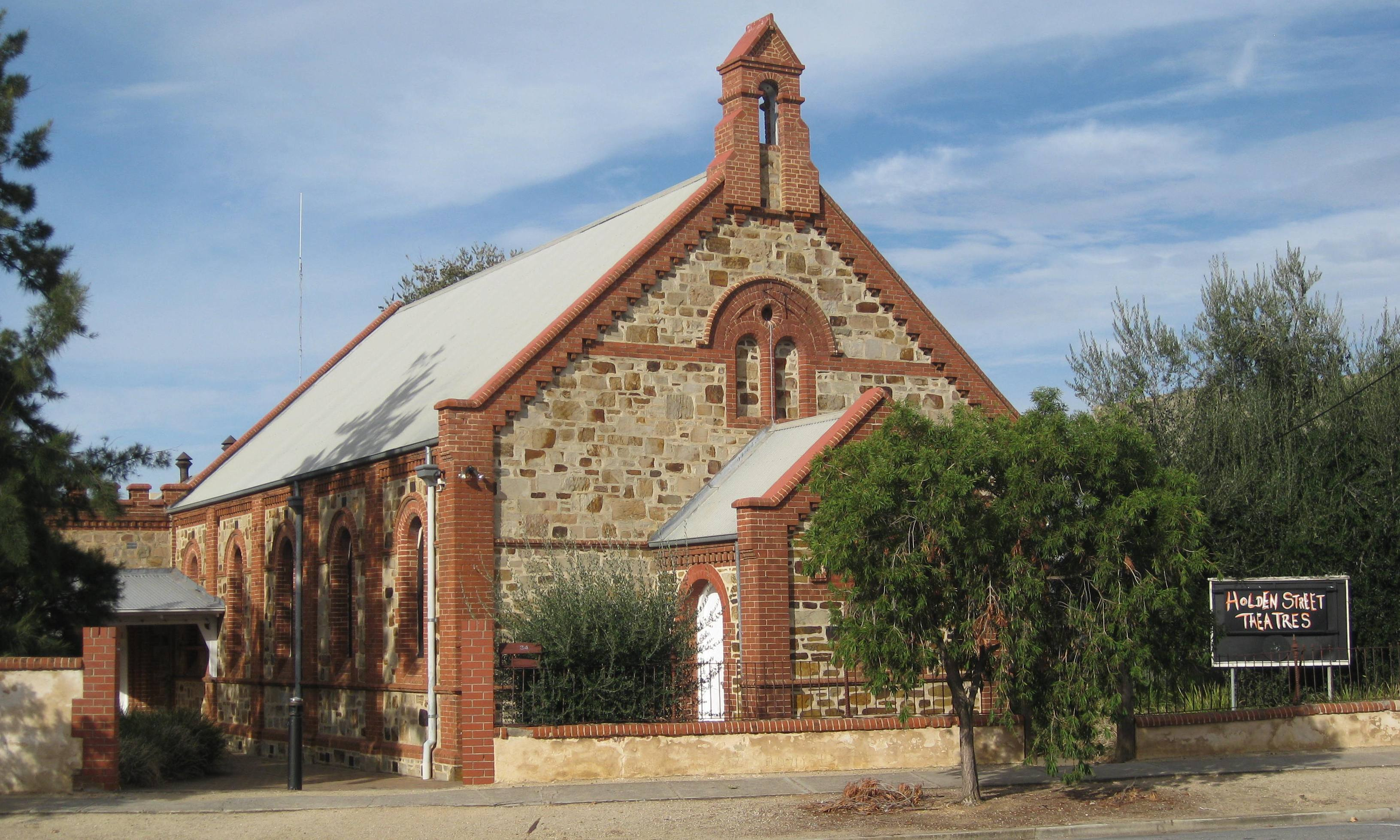
- The Studio as seen from the road at Holden Street Theatres.
- Address: 34 Holden Street; Hindmarsh; Australia
- Type: Theatre

Construction
- Groundbreaking: 1849
- Built: 1850
- Architect: Henry Stuckey

Website
- www.holdenstreettheatres.com

Holden Street Theatres (HST) is a South Australian performing arts theatre complex in Hindmarsh, an inner-western suburb of Adelaide. It is housed in the heritage-listed All Saints' Anglican Church (also known as All Saints' Church) complex. The complex includes three performance spaces: The Studio, The Arch and The Bar, and is home to the Holden Street Theatre Company.

Holden Street Theatres hosts performances at the Adelaide Fringe, the Feast Festival, and the Guitars in Bars festival, as well as year-round productions by local, national and international artists. It is home to resident theatre companies Holden Street Theatre Company and Red Phoenix Theatre.

The headquarters are at Thebarton Theatre, with which HST is in partnership.

== Location and description ==
The complex is located at 34 Holden Street, Hindmarsh, next to Coopers Stadium.

There are three performance spaces within the complex: The Studio (up to 150 seats), The Arch (125 seats, named for its proscenium arch ceiling), and The Bar (capacity 60–100 people). An extra performance space and two galleries are provided during the Adelaide Fringe. The head office is at the Thebarton Theatre, which is in partnership with Holden Street Theatres.

== History ==
Holden Street Theatres is situated in what was originally the All Saints' Anglican Church. Built in the Norman style the limestone and brick church was designed by Henry Stuckey. Bishop Augustus Short laid the foundation stone in 1849, and the church that was opened on 23 June 1850. During this time a rectory was also built near by to house the clergy for the church. In 1955 a gallery was built with a chancel and vestry being added in 1872. Due to lack of funds the church had to rely on donations from the community to add the chancel and vestry, with local Thebarton resident, John Taylor, donating a majority of the £272 needed. Several years later the All Saints Church Hall was built nearby. Designed in a similar style to the church, it was opened on 28 March 1883.

The buildings were listed on the former Register of the National Estate on 28 September 1982 and on the South Australian Heritage Register on 23 November 1989. During the later part of the 20th century the church, hall and rectory became disused, until the site was taken on by the City of Charles Sturt and became a space for lease.

In 2002 the church and hall were leased by Weslo Holdings under guidance of artistic director Martha Lott to be used as a theatre venue, while the Nature Foundation SA took over the rectory as its head offices. Lott, who is Adelaide-born, had studied acting for three years at Drama Centre London. She then moved to Sydney and started working in retail and business management for nearly five years before returning to Adelaide.

The original church was renovated in 2004 to become The Arch.

In December 2020 the Nature Foundation of South Australia moved out of the rectory and it was incorporated into Holden Street Theatres to create the Holden Street Theatres' Arts Park. It offers several more rooms and a garden to be used as rehearsal or performance spaces.

The building is owned by the Government of South Australia through its Office for Recreation, Sport and Racing, and has been maintaining the building. In September 2026, Holden Theatres announced that all performances in the two main spaces of the church building would be paused while engineers and heritage architects investigated, owing to the rigging attached to the wall having come loose. After discovering that major work was necessary to make the buildings safe, Holden Street's November production of Irish playwright Conor McPherson's The Weir had to be cancelled, along with some other independent productions. After work funded jointly by the government and the theatre company, the theatre is expected to reopen by the end of the year as scheduled, and will again be hosting Adelaide Fringe events in 2027.

== Associated companies and events ==
Holden Street Theatre Company is resident at the complex, presenting its debut show, Looped, in May 2023, and thereafter planning to present three shows a year.

Holden Street Theatres was formerly the home of Red Phoenix Theatre Company, a local South Australian community theatre company that is dedicated to producing only plays which have not been performed in Adelaide before. However, by the end of 2025, Red Phoenix had found a new home at the Goodwood Theatre in Unley.

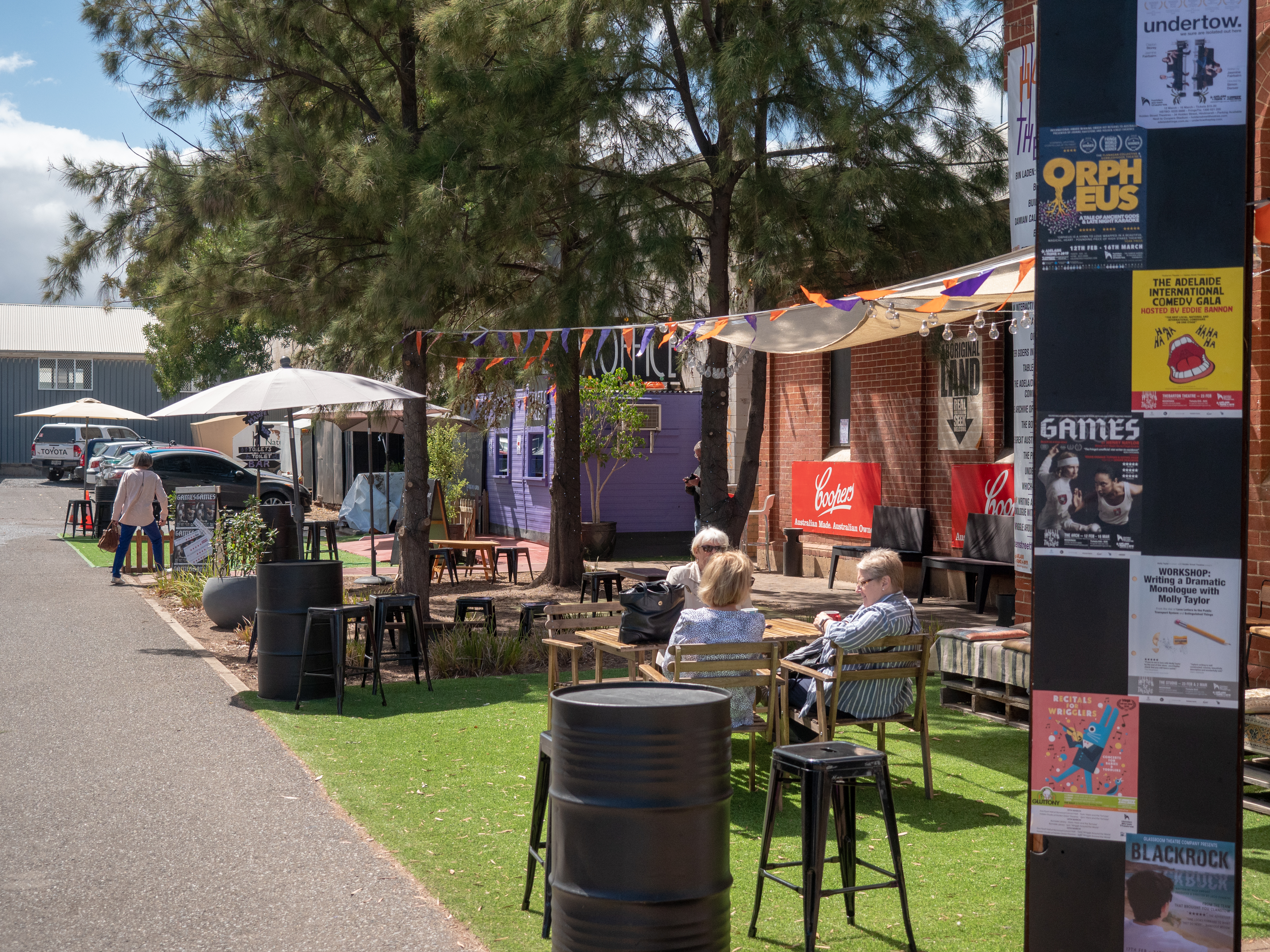
Holden Street Theatres outside seating set up for Fringe season.

The venue also hosts many events as part of the Adelaide Fringe, the annual open-access arts festival and Feast Festival, an annual festival celebrating the LGBT community.

It formerly hosted some events of the Guitars in Bars festival, an annual festival aimed at getting more local music into small venues, until its axing by the Adelaide Festival Centre in December 2025.

As of October 2026 founder Martha Lott is still artistic director of the theatre.

=== Notable shows ===
The Holden Street Theatre Company presented its debut show, Looped, on 2 May 2023. It is a Broadway play by New York writer Matthew Lombardo inspired by an incident which occurred during mid-20th century American stage and film actress Tallulah Bankhead's last movie role, playing a religious fanatic in the 1965 horror film Die! Die! My Darling!. The play was directed by Peter Goers, who in 2004 co-directed the first show at the theatre, California Suite by Neil Simon.

== Holden Street Theatres Awards ==
Holden Street Theatres also gives out two annual awards, one at the Adelaide Fringe and one at the Edinburgh Festival Fringe.

The Holden Street Theatres' Edinburgh Fringe Award gives support to the winning company to tour its show at the following Adelaide Fringe. The award is open to theatre shows performed at the Edinburgh Festival Fringe who have not previously performed the show in Australia.

Holden Street Theatres' Edinburgh Fringe Award winners:

- 2008: Dogstar Theatre - The Tailor of Inverness
- 2009: Horizon Arts with Richard Jordan Productions & Ralph Dartford Associates - Heroin(e) for Breakfast
- 2010: Beartrap Theatre - Bound
- 2011: Les Enfants Terribles Theatre Co. - The Terrible Infants
- 2012: Second Shot Productions - Glory Dazed
- 2013: Snuff Box Theatre and Richard Jordan Productions - Bitch Boxer
- 2014: Lip Sink & Francesca Clark Productions - Mush & Me
- 2014: Penn State Center Stage - Blood at the Root
- 2015: Joe Sellman-Leava - Lables
- 2015: Gary McNair - A Gambler's Guide to Dying
- 2016: Prime Cut Productions - Scorch
- 2016: Red Beard Productions and Gilded Balloon - Angel by Henry Naylor
- 2017: Unpolished Theatre and Pleasance Theatre Trust - Flesh & Bone
- 2018: Molly Taylor - Extinguished Things
- 2018: Stephen Joseph Theatre and Tara Finney Productions - Build a Rocket
- 2019: Sh!t Theater - Sh!t Theatre Drink Rum with Expats
- 2022: Lawrence Batley Theatre in association with Ketchup Productions and Richard Jordan Productions - Jesus Jane Mother & Me
- 2025: Jade Franks - Eat the Rich (but maybe not me mates x)

The Holden Street Theatres' Adelaide Fringe Award is awarded to a local producer during the Adelaide Fringe and gives support in the form of venue and rehearsal spaces for a new production from the company.

Holden Street Theatres' Adelaide Fringe Award winners:

- 2016: Gobsmacked Theatre - Dropped
- 2017: Joanne Hartstone - The Girl Who Jumped Off the Hollywood Sign
- 2018: CCtheatreCo. - Abandon Ship
- 2019: Under the Microscope Productions - 30,000 Notes
- 2020: starheART Theatre - Dirty People
- 2020: Millicent Sarre - Friendly Feminism for the Mild Mannered
- 2021: Taylor Nobes - Does It Please You?
