= San Lorenzo, California =

Unincorporated community in California, United States

San Lorenzo
- Census-designated place
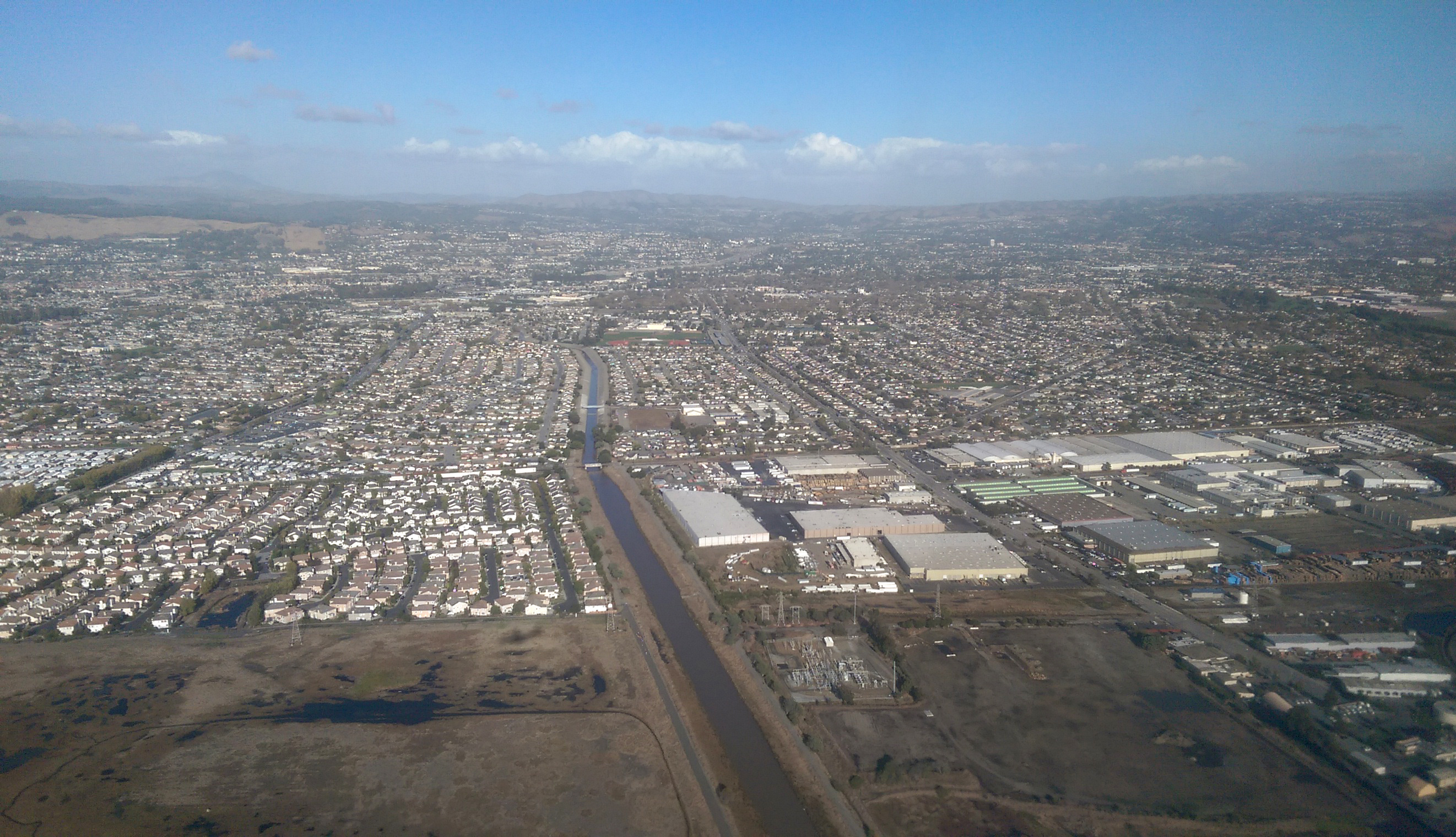
- Interactive map of San Lorenzo
- Location in the United States
- Coordinates: 37°40′52″N 122°07′28″W
- Country: United States
- State: California
- County: Alameda

Government
  - State Senate: Vacant
  - State Assembly: Liz Ortega (D)
  - U. S. Congress: Aisha Wahab (D)

Area
  - Total: 3.067 sq mi (7.94 km^{2})
  - Land: 3.046 sq mi (7.89 km^{2})
  - Water: 0.021 sq mi (0.054 km^{2}) 0.67%
- Elevation: 36 ft (11 m)

Population (2020)
  - Total: 29,581
  - Density: 9,711/sq mi (3,750/km^{2})
- Time zone: UTC-8 (Pacific (PST))
  - Summer (DST): UTC-7 (PDT)
- ZIP code: 94580
- Area codes: 510, 341
- FIPS code: 06-68112
- GNIS feature IDs: 232433, 1659583, 2409260

San Lorenzo (Spanish for "Saint Laurence") is a census-designated place (CDP) located in the historic Eden Township in the East Bay of the San Francisco Bay Area in Alameda County, California, United States. The population was 29,581 at the 2020 census. It is an unincorporated community, located at the banks of San Lorenzo Creek. It was originally named Squattersville in 1851, but later renamed to San Lorenzo.

In 1944, under contract to the U.S. Navy, The David D. Bohannon Company began construction of San Lorenzo Village, which was one of the nation's first planned communities, with parcels designated for schools, churches, parks, and several retail centers. Bohannon's pioneering pre-cutting techniques, referred to as the "California method," were used in later developments, such as the more famous Levittown, Pennsylvania.

== History ==
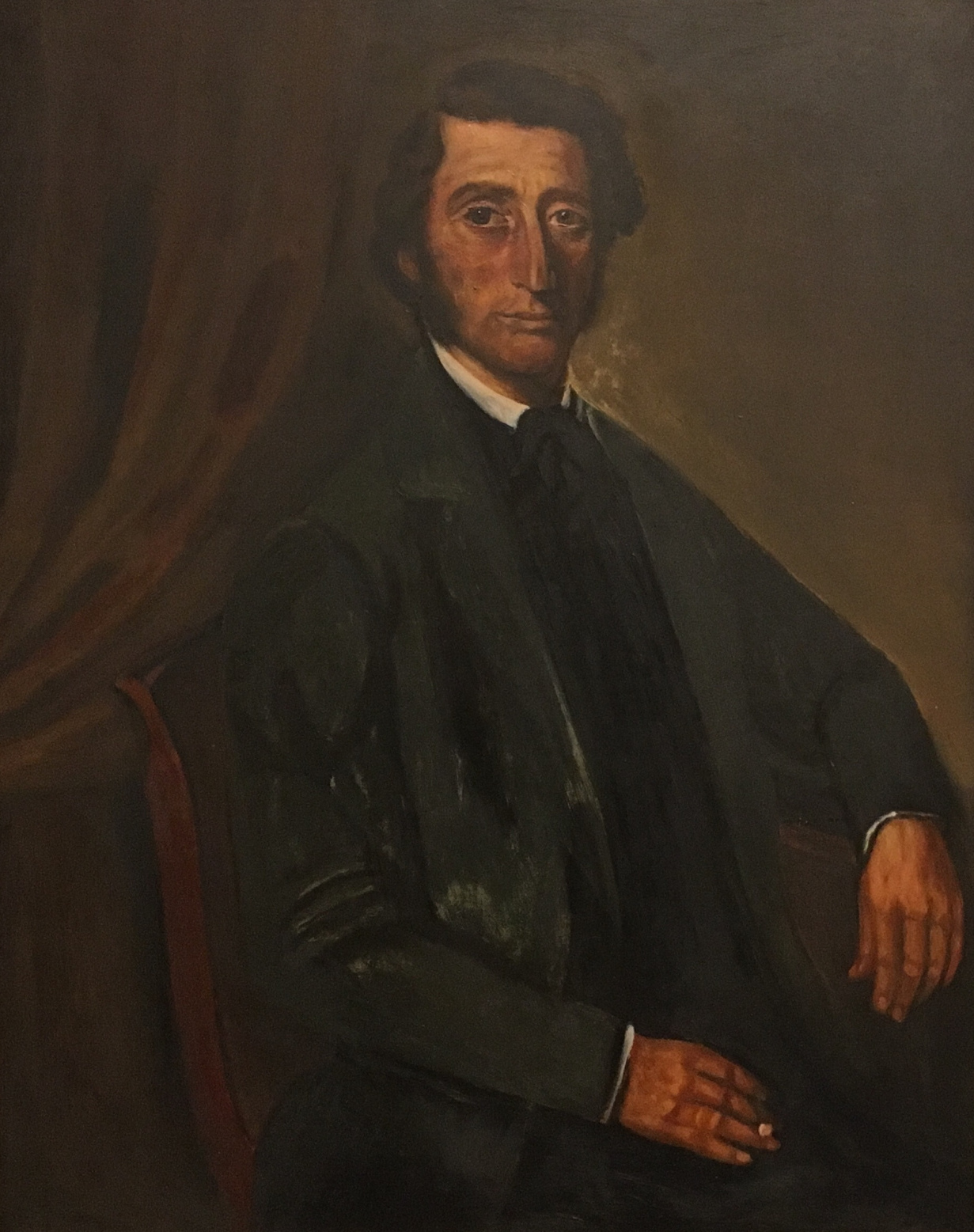
San Lorenzo is named after Rancho San Lorenzo, a vast estate granted in 1841 to Don Guillermo Castro, a noted Californio ranchero.

San Lorenzo is located on the route of El Camino Viejo on land of the former Rancho San Lorenzo, a Mexican land grant given to Guillermo Castro in 1841, and the former Rancho San Leandro, granted to José Joaquin Estudillo in 1842.

Early residents during the California Gold Rush era lived here as squatters along the border between Rancho San Lorenzo and Rancho San Leandro. The informal name given to the area was Squatterville.

The first post office opened in San Lorenzo in 1854.

Many of the early inhabitants are buried in San Lorenzo Pioneer Cemetery, including Moses Wicks, who brought oysters to San Leandro Bay from Patchogue, Long Island. The cemetery is maintained by the county and the Hayward Area Historical Society.

San Lorenzo was mostly farmland, a significant center of production of fruit and flowers, from the mid-19th century to the mid-20th century.

In 1944, under contract to the U.S. Navy, The David D. Bohannon Company began construction of San Lorenzo Village, a tract of two- and three-bedroom homes for workers in the East Bay's war industries. San Lorenzo Village was one of the nation's first planned communities, with parcels designated for schools, churches, parks, and several retail centers. Bohannon's pioneering pre-cutting techniques, referred to as the "California method," were used in later developments, such as the more famous Levittown, Pennsylvania. Home construction continued into the 1950s to accommodate the region's booming population.

San Lorenzo Village housing project launched as the largest privately financed housing project on the West Coast during WWII. San Lorenzo Shopping Center became one of the country's first planned community shopping centers and was home to the first Mervyn's Department Store.

=== Segregation ===
The original San Lorenzo Village homes were restricted to white owners, and re-sale of homes were limited to white owners through racially restrictive covenants on property deeds. "Sales brochures in the early to mid-1950s [...] assured prospective buyers that the village was "a safe investment" because "farsighted protective restrictions ... permanently safeguard your investment."" These restrictions, among others around fencing and house colors, were enforced by the San Lorenzo Village Association.

Legal enforcement of such covenants was deemed to violate the Equal Protection Clause of the Fourteenth Amendment by the Supreme Court in Shelley v. Kraemer (1948), meaning that while parties could choose to abide by the covenants, they could no longer be legally used to prevent non-white persons from buying properties with such restrictions. As a general note, without specific reference to San Lorenzo, after Shelley, homeowners associations still would bar non-white owners by requiring membership in the association before buying property, and federal and state governments refused to enforce the Shelley decision. In San Lorenzo, the black population remained under one-half percent in the early 1970s.

The language of these restrictions, even if not enforceable, may still be on property deeds.

== Geography ==
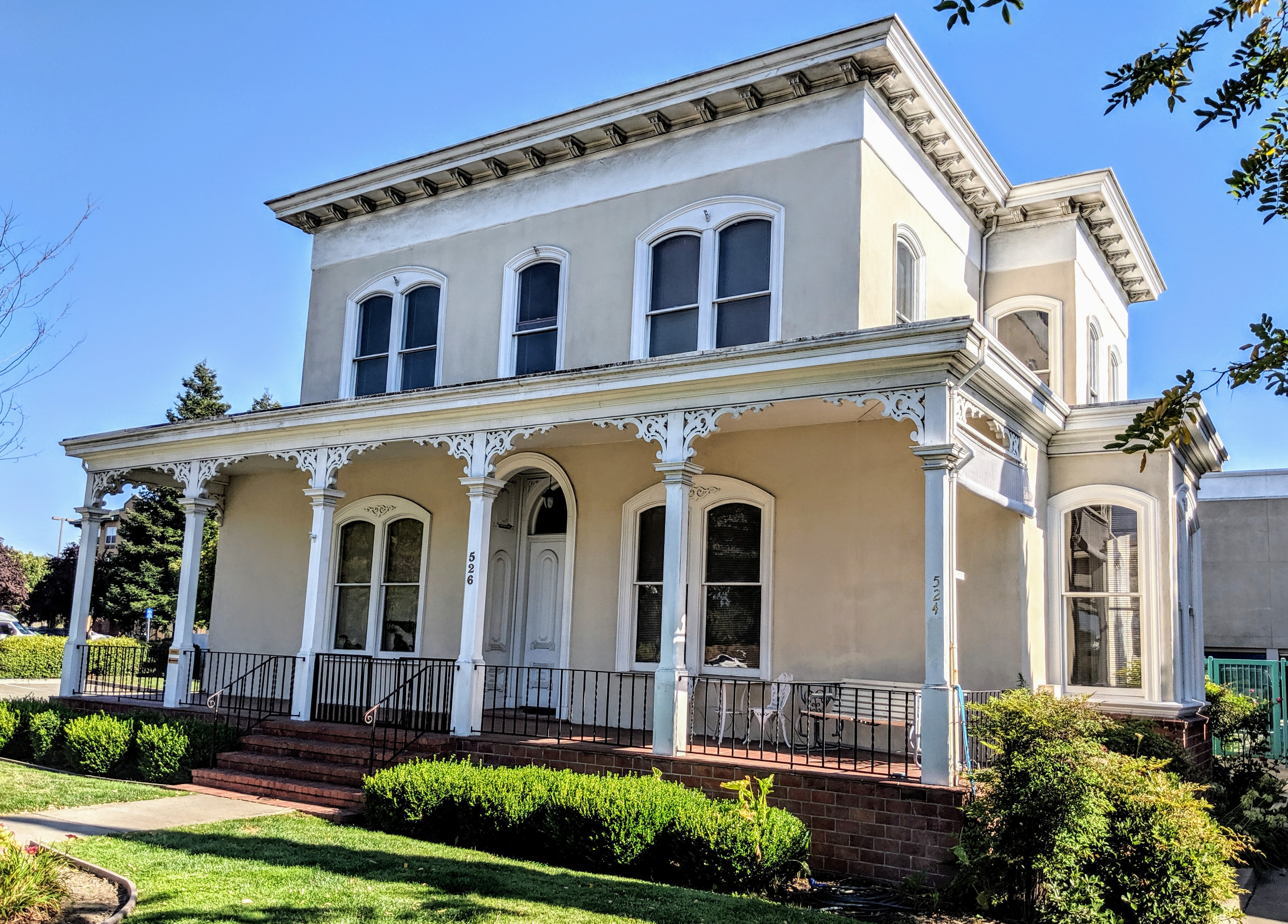
William Roberts House

According to the United States Census Bureau, the CDP has a total area of 3.07 square miles (8.0 km^{2}), of which 3.05 square miles (7.9 km^{2}) is land and 0.68% is water. San Lorenzo Creek runs along its northern border. It is located between the incorporated cities of San Leandro to the north and Hayward to the south.

== Demographics ==
Historical population
Census	Pop.	Note	%±
1960	23,773		—
1970	24,633		3.6%
1980	20,545		−16.6%
1990	19,987		−2.7%
2000	21,898		9.6%
2010	23,452		7.1%
2020	29,581		26.1%
U.S. Decennial Census; 1860–1870 1880-1890; 1900 1910 1920; 1930 1940 1950; 1960 1970 1980; 1990 2000 2010; 2020

San Lorenzo first appeared as an unincorporated community in the 1960 U.S. census; and as a census-designated place in the 1980 United States census.

=== Racial and ethnic composition ===
San Lorenzo CDP, California – Racial and ethnic composition Note: the US Census treats Hispanic/Latino as an ethnic category. This table excludes Latinos from the racial categories and assigns them to a separate category. Hispanics/Latinos may be of any race.
Race / Ethnicity (NH = Non-Hispanic)	Pop 2000	Pop 2010	Pop 2020	% 2000	% 2010	% 2020
White alone (NH)	11,475	7,592	5,824	52.40%	32.37%	19.69%
Black or African American alone (NH)	584	1,062	1,424	2.67%	4.53%	4.81%
Native American or Alaska Native alone (NH)	102	73	60	0.47%	0.31%	0.20%
Asian alone (NH)	3,331	4,957	8,248	15.21%	21.14%	27.88%
Native Hawaiian or Pacific Islander alone (NH)	90	167	312	0.41%	0.71%	1.05%
Other race alone (NH)	46	51	121	0.21%	0.22%	0.41%
Mixed race or Multiracial (NH)	872	707	1,104	3.98%	3.01%	3.73%
Hispanic or Latino (any race)	5,398	8,843	12,488	24.65%	37.71%	42.22%
Total	21,898	23,452	29,581	100.00%	100.00%	100.00%

=== 2020 census ===
As of the 2020 census, San Lorenzo had a population of 29,581 and a population density of 9,711.4 inhabitants per square mile (3,749.6/km^{2}).

The census reported that 100.0% of residents lived in urban areas, while 0.0% lived in rural areas.

The median age was 39.4 years. 21.3% of residents were under the age of 18 and 15.1% were 65 years of age or older. For every 100 females there were 95.9 males, and for every 100 females age 18 and over there were 93.3 males age 18 and over.

The census reported that 99.0% of the population lived in households, 0.6% lived in non-institutionalized group quarters, and 0.3% were institutionalized.

There were 8,991 households in San Lorenzo, of which 37.0% had children under the age of 18 living in them. Of all households, 54.4% were married-couple households, 15.1% were households with a male householder and no spouse or partner present, and 24.7% were households with a female householder and no spouse or partner present. About 17.1% of all households were made up of individuals and 9.2% had someone living alone who was 65 years of age or older. The average household size was 3.26. There were 6,884 families (76.6% of all households).

There were 9,198 housing units at an average density of 3,019.7 units per square mile (1,165.9 units/km^{2}), of which 8,991 (97.7%) were occupied, leaving a vacancy rate of 2.3%. Among occupied units, 64.1% were owner-occupied and 35.9% were occupied by renters. The homeowner vacancy rate was 0.5% and the rental vacancy rate was 2.0%.

Racial composition as of the 2020 census
Race	Number	Percent
White	7,358	24.9%
Black or African American	1,526	5.2%
American Indian and Alaska Native	474	1.6%
Asian	8,356	28.2%
Native Hawaiian and Other Pacific Islander	344	1.2%
Some other race	7,377	24.9%
Two or more races	4,146	14.0%
Hispanic or Latino (of any race)	12,488	42.2%

=== 2023 American Community Survey ===
In 2023, the US Census Bureau estimated that 37.9% of the population were foreign-born. Of all people aged 5 or older, 43.1% spoke only English at home, 29.9% spoke Spanish, 2.6% spoke other Indo-European languages, 23.4% spoke Asian or Pacific Islander languages, and 1.0% spoke other languages. Of those aged 25 or older, 82.3% were high school graduates and 25.4% had a bachelor's degree.

The median household income was $110,495, and the per capita income was $41,279. About 4.0% of families and 5.6% of the population were below the poverty line.

== Government ==
San Lorenzo is an unincorporated community and thus is governed directly by the County of Alameda. The area is policed by the Alameda County Sheriff's Office.

== Public education ==
San Lorenzo is served by the San Lorenzo Unified School District, established in 1865.
