= Dale R. Herspring =

American political scientist (1940–2025)

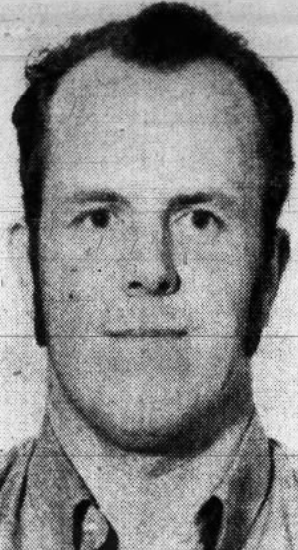
- Herspring in 1969
- Born: Dale Roy Herspring; September 28, 1940; Alameda County, California, U.S.
- Died: July 15, 2025 (aged 84); Wichita, Kansas, U.S.
- Education: Stanford University; Georgetown University; University of Southern California
- Occupation: Political scientist

Dale Roy Herspring (September 28, 1940 – July 15, 2025) was an American political scientist.

== Life and career ==
Herspring was born in Alameda County, California, the son of Frank and Ruby Herspring. He attended Castro Valley High School, graduating in 1958. After graduating, he attended Stanford University, earning his BA degree in 1965. He also attended Georgetown University, earning his MA degree in government in 1967. After earning his degrees, he was awarded a Fulbright scholarship at the Free University of Berlin, researching for a doctoral dissertation on the National People's Army and the Socialist Unity Party of Germany, which after researching at Berlin, he attended the University of Southern California, earning his PhD degree in political science in 1972.

Herspring served as a professor in the department of political science at Kansas State University from 1993 to 2015. During his years as a professor, in 2007, he was named a distinguished professor.

== Death ==
Herspring died in Wichita, Kansas, on July 15, 2025, at the age of 84.
