= Looped =

2010 play by Matthew Lombardo

- Promotional poster for Broadway
- Original language: English
- Written by: Matthew Lombardo
- Setting: Summer of 1965

Premiere
- Official website

Looped is a play by Matthew Lombardo about an event surrounding actress Tallulah Bankhead. It had a Broadway run in 2010, after two previous productions in 2008 and 2009, all three of them featuring Valerie Harper.

== Plot ==
Based on a real event, Looped takes place in the summer of 1965, when an inebriated Tallulah Bankhead needed eight hours to redub, or "loop", one line of dialogue for her last movie, Die! Die! My Darling!: "And so Patricia, as I was telling you, that deluded rector has in literal effect closed the church to me." Though Bankhead's outsized personality dominates the play, the sub-story involves her battle of wills with a film editor named Danny Miller, who has been selected to work that particular sound editing session.

== Productions ==
The first performance of Looped was as a January 8, 2007 New World Stages reading, with Elizabeth Ashley as Tallulah Bankhead and Neal Huff as Danny Miller.

In 2008 the play's writer Matthew Lombardo pitched Looped to Valerie Harper - who Lombardo states he envisioned as Tallulah Bankhead when he wrote the play. Harper invited Rob Ruggiero, who in 1998 had directed her off-Broadway in All Under Heaven, to helm Looped, which premiered at the Pasadena Playhouse, Pasadena, California in the summer of 2008. According to Harper, "When the show ran in Pasadena, we got a lot of feedback that the first act was uproariously funny, and the second act was very, very dark. It was almost like two separate plays. Since then...Matthew Lombardo...has added more depth and context to the first act, and more laugh lines to the second act. It’s now a much more cohesive journey."

With Harper reprising her role, the rewritten Looped would play 2009 engagements at the Cuillo Centre for the Arts in West Palm Beach, Florida, and at the Arena Stage of the Lincoln Theater (Washington D.C.). Created by Chad Allen in Pasadena, the role of Danny Miller would be played in West Palm Beach and Washington D.C. by Jay Goede.

It was announced in December 2009 that Harper would be reprising her starring role in Looped in a Broadway production of the play which, as scheduled, began preview performances at the Lyceum Theatre on February 19, 2010, to officially open on March 14, 2010. Directed by Rob Ruggiero, who had helmed the play's prior engagements, the Broadway production of Looped featured Brian Hutchison and Michael Mulheren: its creative team including Adrian W. Jones (sets), William Ivey Long (costumes), Ken Billington (lighting), and Michael Hooker (sound). The Broadway production of Looped typically drew glowing notices for Harper but not the play, exemplified by Asbury Park Press critic Bill Canacci's assessment: "Harper...is consistently excellent. [...] Too bad she did not have better material. [...] This a long two hours [that] even with Harper's performance [is] not worth watching". Looped would prove a Broadway flop, closing after 33 performances and 27 previews on April 11, 2010, the play unable to survive for the remaining three weeks until the announcement of the Tony Award nominations. Harper received a Tony nomination for Best Performance by a Leading Actress in a Play and was considered a deserving contender in a strong field, although Viola Davis (Fences) was favored to win (and did).

Although a Toronto engagement of Looped with Harper was tentatively announced at the time of the Broadway production's closing, it would not be until the summer of 2012 that a February 2013 engagement at the Bushnell in Lombardo's hometown of Hartford, Connecticut, was announced to inaugurate a four city tour of Looped headlined by Harper. While rehearsing for Looped in January 2013, Harper experienced health issues mandating her hospitalization: after initial reports that Harper would be able to headline the Looped tour with its Bushnell engagement postponed, the premiere engagement instead being at the Parker Playhouse (Fort Lauderdale), it was announced by the end of January 2013 that Harper would be replaced in the role of Tallulah Bankhead by Stefanie Powers, who had co-starred (as Patricia) with Tallulah Bankhead in the film Die! Die! My Darling!. With three weeks rehearsal, Powers premiered as Tallulah Bankhead in February 2013 at the Parker Playhouse engagement of Looped, subsequently headlining engagements at the Hippodrome Theatre (Baltimore), the Cutler Majestic Theatre (Boston), and the Bushnell. Brian Hutchison reprised the role of Danny Miller in the 2013 tour of Looped.

Subsequent theatrical productions of Looped include:

- July 2013: with Colleen Zenk (Stageworks, Hudson, New York)
- July 2014: with Diane Louise Salinger (Ensemble Theatre, Santa Barbara, California)
- February 2019: with Judith Chapman (Desert Rose Playhouse, Palm Springs, California)
- May 2023: with Martha Lott (Holden Street Theatres, Adelaide, South Australia)
- October 2024: with Eileen Bowman (The Roustabouts at the Legler Benbough Theatre, San Diego, California)

== Awards and nominations ==
=== Original Broadway production ===
Year	Award	Category	Nominee	Result
2010	Tony Award	Best Actress in a Play	Valerie Harper	Nominated
