= Jade Franks =

English comedian, actor and director

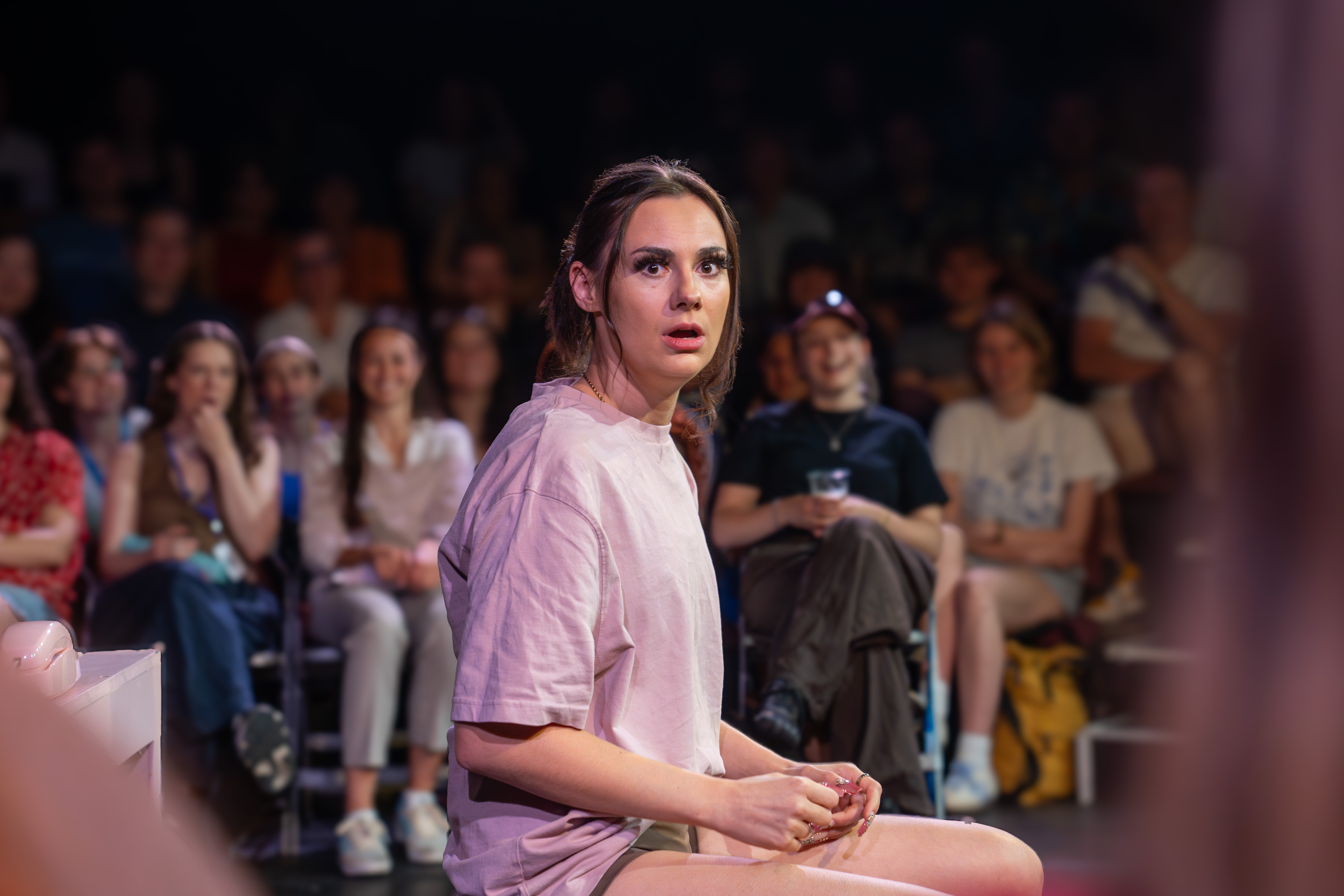
- Jade Franks at the 2025 Edinburgh Festival Fringe
- Born: 1996 or 1997 (age 28–29); Wallasey, Merseyside, England
- Education: St Edmund's College, Cambridge

Jade Franks is an English comedian, actor and writer who took a solo stand-up show to the Edinburgh Fringe Festival in 2025, which subsequently ran at the Soho Theatre, and was adapted for TV for Netflix.

== Early life and education ==
Franks was born and grew up in Wallasey, Wirral. After leaving school, she worked in a call centre, and was later accepted on to a degree course in theatre and education at St Edmund's College, Cambridge. Franks began her course in 2018, and graduated in 2021.

== Acting and writing career ==
In Cambridge, Franks took leading roles in a number of student theatre productions, including a play by Luke Barnes on the Hillsborough disaster, 'Bottleneck'. Franks also started doing stand-up comedy while a student, and joined the Footlights club, and in 2020, was elected Footlights president. She began writing an autobiographical play during her final year, and continued to work on this after graduating. In 2025, Franks’ one-woman show Eat The Rich (but maybe not me mates x) debuted at the Edinburgh Fringe Festival. The story, about her first term at university, received excellent reviews. Writing in the Guardian, the reviewer called it a 'scorching comedy .. that uses deep rage and deadpan wit to skewer the ruling class'. The show received a number of awards at the Fringe, including the Filipa Bragança Award for a solo performance by an emerging female, female-identifying or non-binary artist, and the Holden Street Theatres’ Edinburgh Fringe Award, which invites a production to headline at the Adelaide Fringe, South Australia.

In November 2025, it was announced that Netflix were in discussion with director Philip Barantini, over the rights to the adaptation of Eat the Rich for the small-screen. In January 2026, the show moved to the Soho Theatre, London, before touring to Liverpool and Bristol in April and May. Franks subsequently ran the show in Melbourne, Australia, before returning to Soho for a three-week run in July.
