= Beach Blanket Babylon =

Longest running musical revue 1974-2019

- 30th Anniversary poster
- Productions: San Francisco 1974–2019; London 1994; Las Vegas 1999

Steve Silver's Beach Blanket Babylon was the world's longest-running musical revue. The show began its run in 1974, at the Savoy Tivoli and later moved to the larger Club Fugazi in the North Beach district of San Francisco.

The show was created by Steve Silver (1944–1995) along with sisters, native San Franciscans, Roberta and Nancy Bleiweiss. The three started on the streets of San Francisco. Nancy was the star of the show, created her characters and wrote all her own dialogue for all her characters for The Valentine Show (which preceded BBB at the Savoy Tivoli) in Beach Blanket Babylon and Beach Blanket Babylon Goes Bananas, Roberta was the show's manager, Associate Director, Promotion and Publicity Director, Box Office Manager (She made the original tickets for the show (that performed at the Savoy Tivoli) on a copy machine, cut them with scissors and sold the tickets for $2.50 from her home, as a make-shift box office. She then took the tickets to the Tivoli and sold tickets at the door before getting ready to also be a performer in the original show), procured sponsors for the original shows, did the accounting and wrote checks and also performed in the original shows at Savoy Tivoli, Olympus, Dance Your Ass Off and Club Fugazi.

The character of Snow White did not appear in the original shows. It wasn't until the two sisters were no longer in the show that the show title changed to Beach Blanket Babylon Goes to the Stars. and continued since 1995 under the direction of Steve Silver's widow, Jo Schuman Silver, with frequent changes and spoofs of pop and political culture. Performers wear disproportionately large hats/wigs and gaudy costumes while performing satirical renditions of popular songs.

On April 17, 2019, Jo Schuman Silver announced to the staff that the show would be closing on New Year's Eve.

== Plot summary ==
The original Beach Blanket Babylon (started in 1974) and Beach Blanket Babylon Goes Bananas (that started in 1975) evolved from the street group that Roberta and Nancy Bleiweiss and Steve Silver performed on the streets of San Francisco during the early 70s when street artists made a living performing.'Beach Blanket Babylon Goes to the Stars' did not start until the late 70s. It follows Snow White as she takes a fast-paced journey around the world in search of her "Prince Charming". Along the way she encounters a large group of figures from popular culture, who together perform satirical songs. Figures lampooned include politicians and political figures from the San Francisco, California and U.S. governments, film and television stars, famous singers and athletes, and others who have been in the news. Also present are long-running characters such as Glinda the Good Witch, Mr. Peanut, Louis XIV, Oprah Winfrey, James Brown, Tina Turner, Carmen Miranda, Elvis Presley, a band of dancing French Poodles, and Snow White's tour guide, a female narrator who takes on several incarnations from an Italian pizza lady to a cowgirl.

== Reviews ==
The show was described as "A constant cascade of showstoppers" by the San Francisco Chronicle in 2010.

== Awards and accolades ==
In 1996, the 600 block of Green Street, between Columbus Avenue and Powell Street, was renamed "Beach Blanket Babylon Boulevard" in honor of Steve Silver.

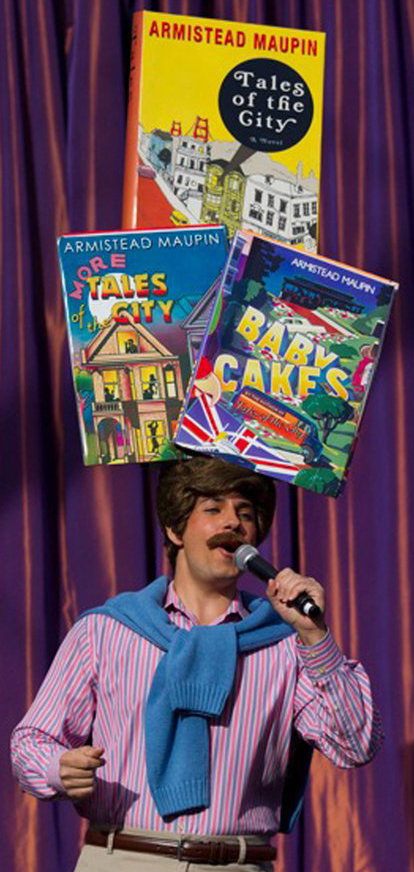
Christopher Goodwin, in costume as a member of the Beach Blanket Babylon cast, at opening of the Tales of The City musical, 2011

== Final production team ==
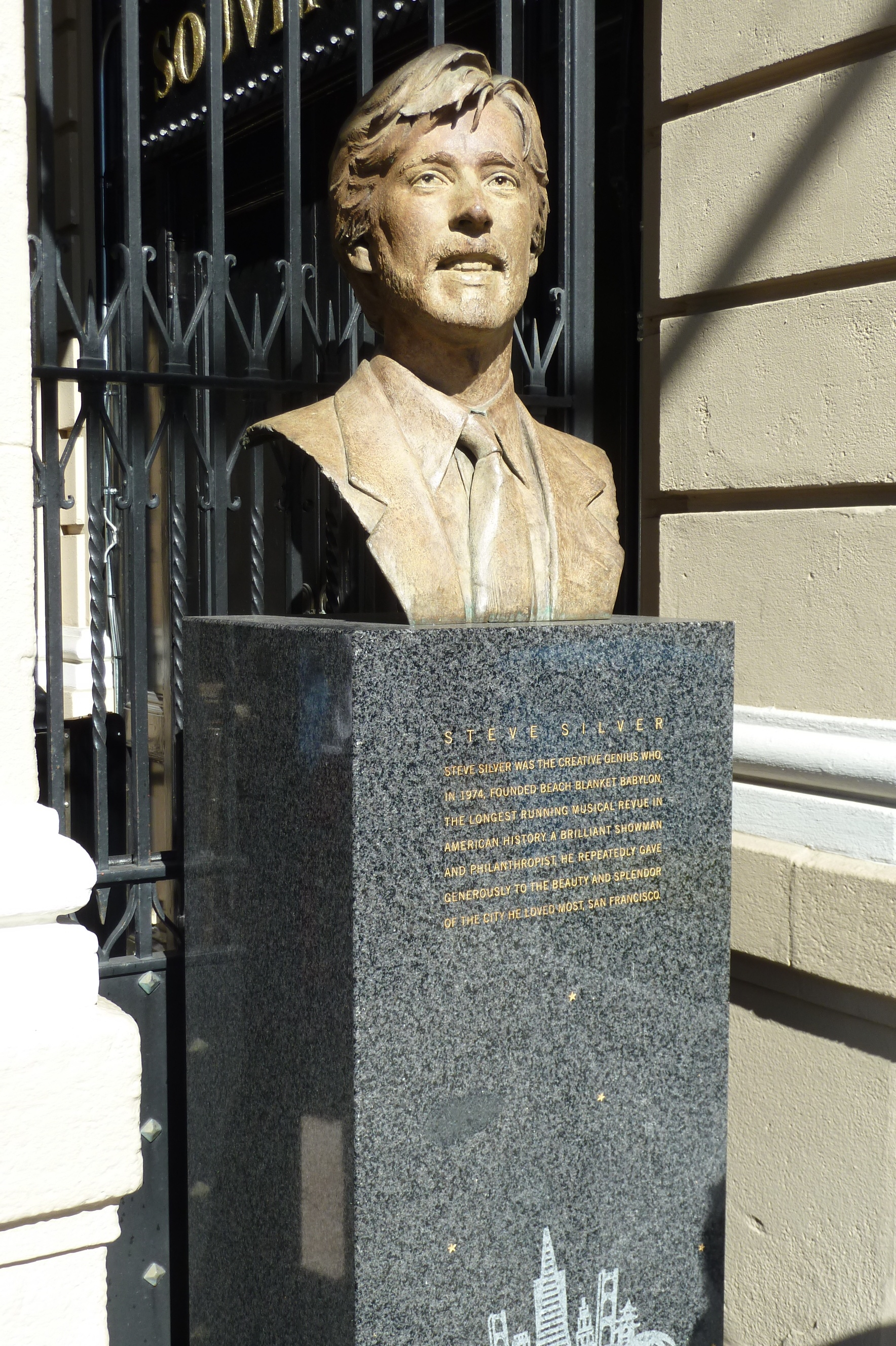
Bronze bust of Steve Silver at Club Fugazi, San Francisco

- Steve Silver (Creator)
- Jo Schuman Silver (Producer, Writer)
- Kenny Mazlow (Director, Writer, Choreographer)
- Michael Anderburg (Stage Manager, Lighting Designer)
- Tom Schueneman (Sound Designer, Audio Engineer)
- Jayne Serba (Costume Shop Manager, Additional Costume Design/Construction)
- Mark Reina (Assistant Director, Choreographer)
- Matthew James (Prop/Hat Construction, Technical Assistant)
- Bill Keck (Music Director/Conductor, Musical Arrangements)

== Former cast and alumni ==
- Jeffrey Scott Adair 1988–1989 (performer, hat maker)
- Michael Benbrook, 1986–1993 (performer) – Louis XIV
- Nancy Bleiweiss, 1974–1977 (performer) – Carmen Miranda, Opera divas, Glinda the Good Witch
- Roberta Bleiweiss, 1974–1977 (Associate Director, Manager, accountant, Promotion and Publicity Director, procurer of major sponsors and creator of her character and performer)
- Eileen Bowman, 1989 (performer) – Sands Hotel and Casino
- John Bush, 1980–1981 (performer)
- Hayden Hicks, 1983–1985 (performer) Mahatma Gandhi
- Robert Danielson - 1985-2005 -(Drummer)- Beach Blanket Babylon in San Francisco and London Tour
- Val Diamond, 1979–2009 (performer) – Alexis Carrington Colby, Gidget, Mahatma Gandhi, Elizabeth II, Jewish mother, Marie Antoinette, French whore, "San Francisco" Finale Chanteuse
- Sandy Flavin 1981-1984 Understudy to Val Diamond and Susan Parks (1981-1983) Performer 1984–1985. Was the youngest performer to be hired up to 1981.
- Glenda Glayzer, 1975–1979 (performer) - AM I BLUE
- Ed Goldfarb, 1995–2005 (music director)
- Christopher Goodwin, 2005-2007 2011-2019 (performer) Donald Trump, Armistead Maupin, Princess Leia, Mr. Peanut
- Alan Greenspan, 1978– Hat-Maker (Finale Hats Creator/Executor, Special Effects, Props)
- Brent Holland, 1984-1990 1998–2000, (performer) - Louis XIV
- Ben Jones, 2008-2009 (performer) – Elvis, George W. Bush, Bill Clinton, Michael Jackson, Michael Phelps, Arnold Schwarzenegger
- Bill Keck 1993-2019 (musician) - Musical Director/pianist/arranger
- Bill Kendall, 1974-1982 (performer) - Superman, John Travolta Sat Night Fever, The Original Mr. Peanut.
- Teresa Leonard, 1980–1981 (performer)
- Chris March, 1990–2000? (costume/hat/wig designer; performer) – Elizabeth Taylor, Wonder Woman, Monica Lewinsky
- Dani Marcus (performer)- Snow White
- Anna Bergman (performer)
- Ellyn Marie Marsh, 2002–2003 (performer) – Barbra Streisand, Britney Spears, Hillary Clinton, Pineapple Princess
- Stirland Martin, 1993-2004 (performer) - James Brown, Witch Doctor, French Poodle, Willie Brown, Prince, Mike Tyson, DIddy, Nutcracker
- Armistead Maupin, 1974 (writer)
- Tony Michaels, 1974 (performer) – Beach Blanket Babylon at Club Olympus
- Tony Michaels, 1975–1978 (performer) – Beach Blanket Babylon Goes Bananas!
- Skye Dee Miles
- Shoni Mero (performer) Hillary Clinton
- Monique Motil (costumer)
- Robin Murray stage manager 1980-1988
- Ryan Rigazzi, 2000-2012 (performer)
- Jeff Robertson, 1980–1981 (performer)
- Rick Roemer, 1977–1979 (performer) – Beach Blanket Babylon Goes to the Stars!
- Jill Shutt, 1989–1992 (Val Diamond's understudy)
- Paul Thomas (director), 1974 (performer) - Beach Blanket Babylon in San Francisco
- Ledisi Young, 1990–2001 (performer)
- Richard Waits (performer)
- Adam Savage (stagehand)

== Tours ==
Two tours were produced, in London and Las Vegas, in celebration of Beach Blanket's 20th and 25th anniversaries. The show also has a smaller touring cast that caters primarily to corporate events and parties around the world.

London:

- Val Diamond
- Doug Magpiong
- Tony Stroh
- Erica Wyman
- Dana Adkins
- Tony Tripoli
- Renee Lubin
- Cristina VanValkenburg
- Lisa Burnett Bossi
- Stirland Martin
- Kenny Mazlow
- Robert Danielson (musician)

Las Vegas:

- Jeffrey Scott Adair (performer)
- Shelley Werk (performer)
- David Reynolds (performer)
- Kenny Mazlow (performer)
- John Paul Almon (performer)
- Robin Cohen (performer)
- Patrick Reese (performer)
- Richard Pardini (performer)
- Robert Hempstead (performer)
- Janice Sands (performer)
- Joan Benson (performer)
- Stuart May (performer)
- Wanda Houston (performer)
- Sylvia MacCalla (performer)
- Holly Vonk (performer)
- Clay Adkins (performer)
- Jacqui Marshall (performer)
- Diane Ellis (performer)
- Richie Sacks (performer)

== Beach Blanket Babylon, London, Restaurant ==
Named after the show, but otherwise unrelated, Beach Blanket Babylon, a London restaurant with branches in Notting Hill and Shoreditch.

== See also ==
- 61st Academy Awards
