= Val Diamond =

American actress

- Born: 1951 (age 74–75); Castro Valley, California

Val Diamond (born 1951) is a stage performer and San Francisco icon. She is best known for her role in the stage musical, Beach Blanket Babylon.

== Life and career ==
Diamond grew up in Castro Valley, California, the daughter of Harold and Lilly. Her father is Jewish and her mother is an Italian immigrant. She began her acting career in high school, playing Medea in Medea and Anna in The King and I. After high school, she performed with a rock band, touring the country from 1970 to 1978.

After Diamond tired of life on the road, her friend, Shelly Werk, convinced her to audition for Beach Blanket Babylon. Werk was already a cast member. Steve Silver, the creator of the show, wanted Diamond despite the objections of the dance captain. Diamond speculates, "I didn't look like most of the people who were in the show. I was heavyset and I think that bothered them 'cause there was a lot of dancing for me. But I can dance. Women that aren't Twiggy-thin can still dance."

Diamond had her first of over 10,000 performances in Beach Blanket Babylon on 17 January 1979. Diamond has played numerous roles in the show. She is best known for singing San Francisco at the end of the show wearing a tremendous hat depicting numerous San Francisco landmarks. In 1983, she performed at Davies Symphony Hall for Queen Elizabeth II.

Diamond married the Beach Blanket Babylon trumpet player, Steve Salgo, in 1987. They live in Sonoma.

An article in the 2 October 2009, San Francisco Chronicle reported that Diamond's run with Beach Blanket Babylon had come to an end, with her final performance on 23 September 2009. The show's producers, according to the article, did not give a reason.
