= Guillermo Castro (soldier) =

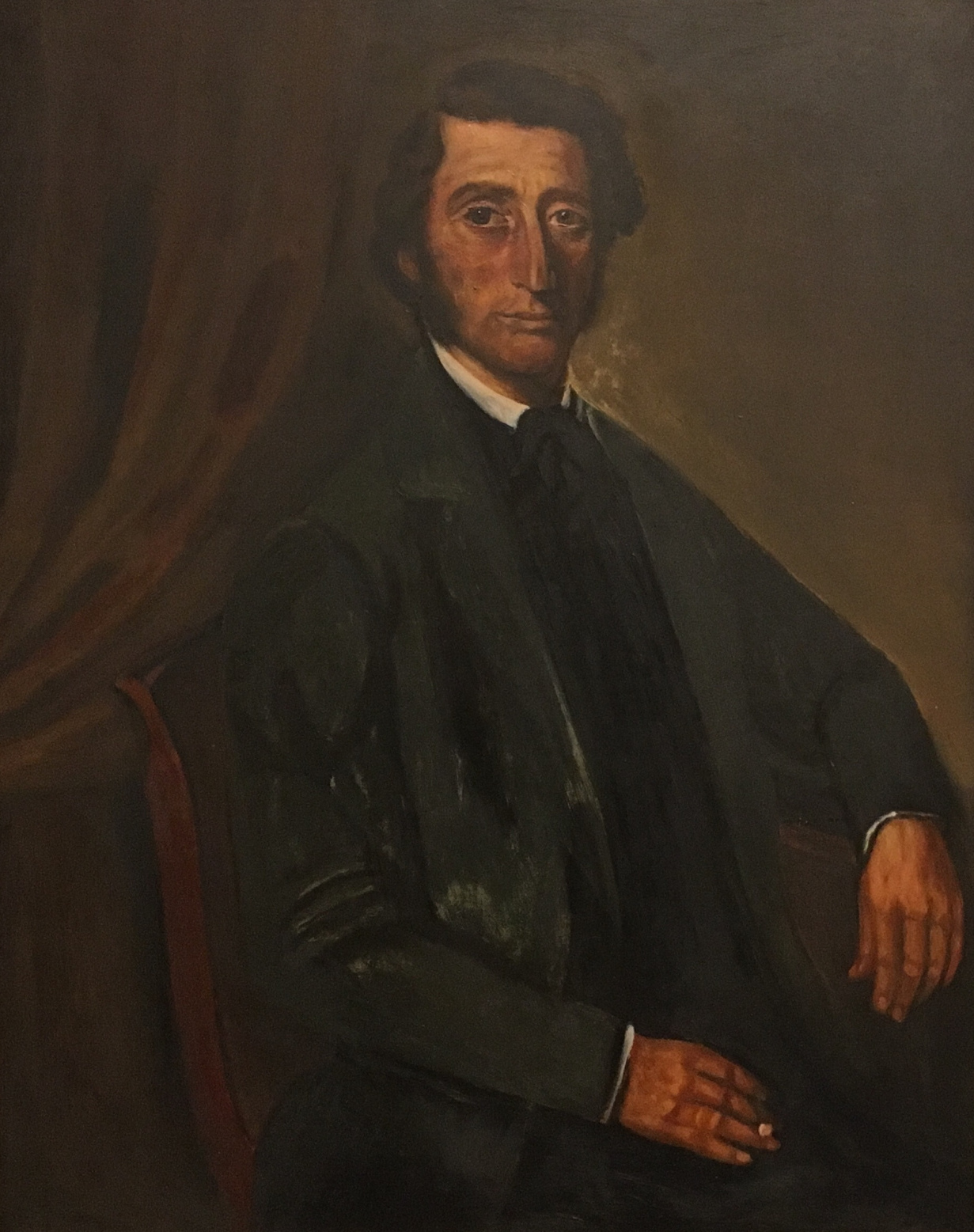
- Portrait by Leonardo Barbieri; 1852.
- Born: 1809; Rancho San Francisco de las Llagas, San Martin, California
- Died: 1866 (aged 56–57)
- Occupations: Ranchero; military officer; surveyor
- Spouse: Luisa Peralta

Don Guillermo Castro (1809-1866) was a Californio ranchero, officer in Mexican Army, local justice of the peace and surveyor who once owned vast land holdings in Alameda County. He is the namesake of the unincorporated community of Castro Valley, California and his land included most of the modern City of Hayward, California.

== Biography ==
=== Early life and career ===
Guillermo José Castro was a third generation Spanish Californian. His grandfather Joaquin Ysidro Castro, grandmother Martina Botiller Castro and their nine children (including his father Carlos) migrated from Sinaloa in New Spain to Alta California, New Spain as members of the fantastically successful 1775-6 Juan Bautista de Anza expedition. The Castros were among the sixty-eight people who founded the Pueblo San Jose in 1777. After 19 years of military service, Joaquin Ysidro Castro and his son-in-law José Maria Soberanes were granted the 7,725-acre (3,126 ha) Rancho Buenavista near Salinas, California in 1795, one of the earliest Spanish rancho lifetime leases.

Guillermo Castro was born on his grandparents' rancho on February 10, 1809, and christened at the Mission San Juan Bautista. An older brother Juan José was killed at the age of 15 in a fall from a horse. In 1834 his father Carlos Antonio Castro received a fee simple grant of the 22,300-acre (9,000 ha) Rancho San Francisco de las Llagas in Santa Clara County. Carlos later took an active role in acquiring land for Guillermo, using his influence for his sons benefit.

At the age of nineteen Guillermo Castro married María Luisa Fermina Peralta, daughter of Luis Peralta, the owner of the first and largest rancho in the East Bay, Rancho San Antonio, consisting of today's Oakland, Berkeley, Albany, Emeryville, and Piedmont. Castro's bride came with a dowry of 230 cattle. The couple had at least nine children: Juan in 1831, Francisco and José Ramon (twins) in 1833, Conception in 1835, Encarnacion in 1836, Loreta in 1837, Guillermo Jr. in 1840, Luis in 1842 and Edelfrida in 1844. They apparently had later children who did not survive to adulthood. One modern reference (In Search of Don Castro, Lynn Mackie, Castro Valley Forum, Progress Edition, March 8, 1993) quotes baptismal records that indicate that the Castros had two more younger children: Belisario Felipe and Fileman. The article is confirmed by reference to the Huntington Library Early California Population Database. This database shows Filemon born in February 1849 and Belisario Felipe in August 1848, which is gestationally impossible—presumably the birthdate is incorrectly recorded or transcribed. Dorothy Mutnick's compilation of the Mission records throws in yet another son, Jose Bernado, although no birthday is given. The Mutnick record states that Jose Bernado died in 1846 and Belisario Felipe died in 1850. There is no date of death for Filemon. The death of several children in such a short time must have been very hard on the Castro's, but was relatively common in that era, probably due in part to advanced maternal age. It was common to see the death of a final child of an older multiparous woman. In the 1852 state census the entire surviving Castro clan appears, and the youngest child is Edelfrida.

Guillermo, like most young men in Alta California, was a soldier and was posted to the pueblo of San José. He rose to the rank of lieutenant. He worked as a surveyor in 1838, assigned to define the vague outlines of the grazing commons of the pueblo of San José so it could be preserved against the onslaught of land privatization.

There is an oft-repeated story of Castro leading an assault on the famed ex-Mission rebel Estanislao (Stanislaus) in 1840, but Estanislao died in 1838. There was a bloody and vengeful attack on Central Valley Native Americans in 1840, but Castro's neighbor José María Amador led that assault, not Castro. Castro was assigned as a justice of the peace in the East Bay in 1843 and was also appointed as a backup judge to the supreme court in 1845, but the court never met.

=== Rancho acquisition ===
Much of the land in today's Alameda County, California was in the possession of the Mission San Jose from 1797 until November 26, 1836. After that date, management of the land was turned over to the Mexican Government of Alta California (nationalized or more specifically, secularized). Almost immediately, three long-serving military men from prominent families vied for grants in two of the adjacent Mission ranchos along the bay, Rancho San Lorenzo and Rancho San Leandro—Guillermo Castro, José Joaquín Estudillo and Francisco Soto. Each would end up with a rancho, but only after years of intrigue.

Guillermo Castro and his father Carlos wasted no time in applying for land on the secularized Rancho San Leandro. Their application was dated December 19, 1836, a mere three weeks after secularization and three weeks before Estudillo's application for the same land. The father and son lamented their inability to grow crops on Carlos's Rancho Las Llagas, which they offered to relinquish in exchange for a new grant in Rancho San Leandro. Given the stated use as farmland, father and son were authorized to occupy a surely disappointing quarter of a league (1.0448 km) on December 7, 1837, being careful not to interfere with Estudillo. No land was granted.

In January 1840, Governor Alvarado gave Guillermo Castro provisional authority to occupy a vaguely described part of the Rancho San Leandro "in the direction of the hills, without passing the line which from north to south is formed by the springs on the place". While he was still fighting over the division of Rancho San Leandro, in late 1840 Carlos Castro applied for a small land grant for Guillermo to build a house, barn, and orchard in the adjacent Rancho San Lorenzo. The home would be at a "place free from the inconveniences liable to be suffered on account of being near the cattle". A 600 varas lot (~62 acres (25 ha)) was granted in February 1841 in the old rancheria area of Rancho San Lorenzo, now downtown Hayward.

With a foot in the door on the Rancho San Lorenzo, in 1841 the Castros petitioned for a 1.5 league (6.2692 km) grant of that rancho. Francisco Soto had also petitioned for 2.5 leagues (10.4487 km) in Rancho San Lorenzo. Thus, the Castro's two outstanding requests had to be reconciled with those of Estudillo and Soto. For this reason, and the fact that the Pueblo San Jose cattle were using Rancho San Lorenzo, awarding of grants to all three men was delayed. Negotiations dragged on, Estudillo's son-in-law William H. Davis characterized Castro's actions as intriguing with his relative, the governor.

In 1842, Estudillo and Soto received land grants, but Castro's multiple requests had truncated the grants to both men, and they were quite aggrieved. Castro had not yet received a rancho grant. Surely losing patience, Carlos Castro combined his two outstanding grant requests into a new petition submitted for his son on October 10, 1843. Action followed quickly, Governor Manuel Micheltorena referred the grant request to Secretary of State Manuel Jimeno on October 13. Ten days later Jimeno recommended approval and on October 25 the "Decree of Concession" was recorded. Castro's "six square league" rancho was eventually mapped to 26,722.52 acres (10,814.22 ha) by the Americans in 1864

Guillermo Castro was one of many Castro family rancho grantees. Including his father and grandfather, the men of the Castro Family were given at least seventeen land grants. Three of his uncles received grants, including Francisco María Castro who was deeded the Contra Costa Rancho San Pablo in 1823, a name still prominent in the San Francisco East Bay. Cousins Victor Castro and Juan Castro were awarded the adjacent El Sobrante grant in 1841.

=== Americans arrive: The Gold Rush and the subsequent land rush ===
Castro built his home in what is now downtown Hayward and lived there undisturbed until the Gold Rush of 1849 brought giant herds of men from around the world to California. Castro actually flourished, selling beef at high prices to feed the hungry miners. His rancho grew to 8000 beeves, 4000 sheep and 500 horses. This was about the maximum number that could be supported on this rangeland, so he was running at peak capacity. But the good times did not last, as failed miners returned to the area and decided to squat on his rancho. Soon his gigantic rancho was filled with squatters. The first squatters to make a claim in Castro Valley were Zachariah Hughes, a Methodist minister and farmer from Missouri, and his stepsons James and John William Jamison. They registered their adjoining claims along the west side of the new Redwood Road with Contra Costa County on November 24, 1852. The next to arrive were William Abel and Richard Dowling Jr., who recorded their claims along the east side of Redwood Road on December 1, 1852. By 1858, there were reportedly eighty squatters on Castro's rancho, fencing his herds out, and cutting down his trees.

A single unreferenced historical source dating to 1876 stated that Castro's downfall was started by a gambling debt of $35,000 accrued during a trip to southern California to buy more beeves for his herd in 1852. This has been repeated dozens of times since it was published. True or not, Guillermo Castro's fate was sealed not by a single event but by an accumulation of errors, old habits, squatters, taxes, usurious interest rates, bad luck, attorney fees and even the weather. In 1855, a property speculation in San Francisco was foreclosed, losing $10,000. His bank went under. Castro had to defend his rancho to the U.S. Land Commission and repeatedly in the District Court, amassing huge legal fees for each step. Castro's wife was the daughter of Luis Maria Peralta, the biggest landholder in the East Bay. But Peralta cut her out of his will, having previously given the young couple cattle as dowry. He left his rancho to his sons and the house in the south bay to his unmarried daughters. The sisters sued to break the will but failed after multiple expensive court battles. Rustlers stole Castro's cattle by the hundreds. Castro filed a lawsuit against eighty interlopers in May 1860, it cost him more than $1700 (about $45,000 in 2022) just to get copies of the suit served to 69 of the 80 defendants.

The long-simmering quarrels Castro initiated over rancho boundaries with his neighbors the Estudillos and Sotos dragged the rancho patenting process out for years. Castro reportedly spent his money lavishly, a form of conspicuous consumption common among the California rancheros. The county imposed new property taxes starting in 1850 which amounted to 1-2% of assessed value. California was hit by a flood and two years of drought that devastated cattle ranching throughout the state. Starting in December 1861, forty-three days of rain turned California's valleys into lakes, rivers tore entire towns away. In northern California, heavy rains mixed with warm temperatures, melting the snowpack in the Sierras. The wet weather reached its crescendo with the Great Flood of January 1862, which was caused by the most intense "Pineapple Express" storm ever observed in California. The unprecedented flood was followed by two years of drought with half the average rainfall. The sun baked the earth, the grass shriveled, and the cattle died "as if they were poisoned". Relentless wildfires followed in the summer of 1865 to top off the natural disaster trifecta. The sequential catastrophes put the final nails in the coffin of the Mexican cattle industry throughout California.

Castro started selling land in 1854, ultimately transferring a total of at least 1,525 acres (617 ha) to thirteen people: In Castro Valley—Zachariah Hughes, William Mattox, Serril Corey and William Knox; in Hayward—William Hayward, George Brown; in Ashland—John Lewelling and Robert Farrelly; as well as S. W. Champlain, Matthias Jewett, Jesse Billings, Amelia Smith and Charles Whitmore. But it was far too little, too late.

=== Leaving California ===
The cumulative effect of these many tribulations, surely psychological as well as financial, compelled Castro to sell his rancho seven months later in February 1863. Alexander Grogan, Atherton's long-time agent, paid $130,000 for the land, forgiving two loans Castro owed to Atherton and absorbing two loans to Castro's attorney Robert Simson. A good estimate of the total cost of the purchase is $200,000, or $8 per 1-acre (4,000 m^{2}). This was a private voluntary sale, not a dramatic foreclosure sale, as reported in other histories. In October 1863, Castro filed a quit-claim deed, transferring any residual interest to land in California to Juan Castro, his eldest son, for "natural love and $5". He declared his plan to leave for Buenos Aires in a December 1863 court deposition and said he would never come back to California, a promise he seemingly kept. He died in Mendoza, Argentina, from pneumonia in 1866, his wife Maria Luisa Peralta Castro passed away five years later. Having cleared $130,000, equal to millions of dollars in 2023, it is evident that Don Guillermo Castro left the United States as a relatively wealthy man. Most of the old California rancho grantees were less successful in profiting from their land grants.

Karma may have intervened on Castro's behalf several generations later—Guillermo Castro's great-great-grandson was the revolutionary leader Ernesto "Che" Guevara who helped Fidel Castro (no known relationship) lead the communist revolution in Cuba in 1958, to the great consternation of the same United States that drove Guillermo Castro into exile 95 years earlier.

A contemporary, Jacob Harlan said of Castro, "Of the Spanish Californians that I have known, Guillermo Castro was the best. He was a sparse, wiry man with brown eyes and hair and was physically active and tough. He was a splendid horseman and he was very extravagant and spent his money freely."

=== Geographical references ===
As previously stated, Castro Valley, California, is named for Guillermo Castro. At the edge of Castro Valley, only partially within the census designated place, is found Don Castro Regional Recreation Area. The land for this park is owned by the Alameda County Flood and Water Conservation District, but the park is operated by the East Bay Regional Park District. The park was established in the late 1960s; the name was suggested by Hayward Historian Harry Bradford.
