= Howard Patrick Gleason =

Alameda County, California, Sheriff and law enforcement innovator

Howard Patrick “Jack” Gleason
- Born: Howard Patrick Gleason; August 31, 1893; Johnstown, New York, United States
- Died: March 4, 1967 (aged 73)
- Other names: Jack Gleason
- Known for: Law enforcement innovation, rehabilitation efforts, Santa Rita Rehabilitation Center
- Notable work: Established Santa Rita Jail, Pioneered law enforcement training programs
- Spouse: Anne Ziehn (married 1928)
- Police career
- Allegiance: United States
- Department: Alameda County Sheriff's Office
- Branch: United States Navy
- Service years: 1917–1920 (Navy); 1936–1963 (Sheriff)
- Status: Retired
- Rank: Sheriff

Howard Patrick “Jack” Gleason (1890-1967)served as Sheriff of Alameda County, California from 1940 through 1963. Gleason was the longest-serving Sheriff in Alameda County history. Appointed in 1940 and subsequently elected to office, he retired in 1963. As the 17th Sheriff, he served through dramatic changes in the county, which had huge impacts on law enforcement. He may have been one of the most consequential Alameda County Sheriffs due to his attempts to incorporate rehabilitation into incarceration. He also sought to improve law enforcement training and professionalization in his department and the Northern California region. He established the original Santa Rita Rehabilitation Center near Dublin in 1947.

== Early life ==
Gleason was born in Johnstown, New York on August 31, 1893. He attended school there and played baseball while in high school. His family moved to Oakland in 1909.

== Early adulthood ==
According to some sources, Gleason played semi-pro baseball until 1917. He enlisted in the Navy that year and served in several locations, including aboard the USS Chattanooga (CL-18) and USS Wilhelmina (ID 2168). He left service in 1920. He completed service as a Chief Boatswain’s Mate.

Gleason reportedly played professional baseball with the Pittsburgh Pirates and St. Louis Browns from 1920 through 1922; however, Baseball Reference does not list him on either team during those seasons. (A Billy Gleason, with different birth and death dates and places, appeared with the Pirates in 1916–1917 and the Browns in 1921.) Another newspaper article said Jack Gleason had played with "several minor league teams, and in 1923, an injured knee put him on the shelf for all time."

In late 1922, he returned to Oakland and found a position with the Oakland Tribune. He later became the manager of the Circulation Department for the paper. He married Anne Ziehn in 1928. In 1936, he resigned and became a deputy sheriff in Alameda County.

Throughout the 1930s he was prominent in veterans’ organizations and Republican Party activities.

== Law enforcement career ==
Gleason joined the Sheriff’s Office as a deputy and served in several positions. A 1941 article noted that Gleason “… has served in virtually all departments of the sheriff’s office, his most recent assignment being bailiff in Superior Judge John D. Murphy’s Court." Gleason was appointed by the Alameda County Board of Supervisors as Under-Sheriff on July 1, 1940, in part to support ailing Sheriff Mchael B. Driver. In November Sheriff Driver resigned due to ill health. The Alameda County Board of Supervisors appointed Gleason as Sheriff on November 28, 1940.

During the next 22 years, Gleason easily won re-election. During his tenure, he was credited with several accomplishments. He negotiated the transfer of a former US Navy Disciplinary Barracks to replace the former county jail. He established the Santa Rita Rehabilitation Center in 1947, which eventually incorporated innovations including a women’s division, clinics for alcoholics and drug addicts, and the first full-time county prison chaplain. For a time, Santa Rita was considered one of the state’s most well-run county jails. Rehabilitation efforts included a fully functioning farm whose efforts provided goods and services that offset a majority of the county jail’s cost. Other accomplishments included establishing the first county crime laboratory, the first introduction of two-person patrol cars with two-way radio communication to the California Department of Motor Vehicles, establishing a 40 hour work week for field deputies, hiring the first African American deputy sheriff, promoting the first African American captain, and promoting the first woman captain. Gleason also helped organize the first peace officers’ training school in Northern California. He was the President, National Sheriff’s Association, for the 1956/57 and 1957/58 terms.

Gleason retired on January 1, 1963. He was succeeded as sheriff by Frank Madigan.

== Death ==
Gleason died on March 4, 1967.
