= Thomas Lafayette Houchins Jr. =

American politician (1923–2005)

Thomas Lafayette Houchins Jr. (November 2, 1923 – February 13, 2005) was sheriff for the Alameda County Sheriff's Office of Alameda County, California from 1975 to 1979. He gained some notoriety as a tough sheriff in his dealings with Berkeley, California protestors in the 1960s. His policing style then, while serving under then-sheriff Frank Madigan, was described as "kick ass and take names" by Sheriff Charles Plummer (who was a field commander for the Berkeley Police Department when riots erupted in People's Park in 1969).
