= Michael B. Driver =

American politician

Michael Branner Driver

Mayor of Berkeley, California
- In office 1927–1930

Sheriff of Alameda County
- In office 1930–1939
- Preceded by: Burton Becker

Personal details
- Born: August 4, 1868; Virginia, U.S.
- Died: July 17, 1942; Berkeley, California, U.S.
- Spouse: Melissa Newkirk
- Children: Dixie, Quigley

Michael Branner Driver (1868–1942) was Mayor of Berkeley, California from 1927 to 1930, and Sheriff of the Alameda County Sheriff's Office, Alameda County, from 1930 to 1939. He resigned as Mayor of Berkeley when he was appointed Sheriff, replacing Sheriff Burton Becker, a member of the local Ku Klux Klan, who was convicted for corruption and sent to San Quentin Prison.

Michael Branner Driver was born August 4, 1868, in Virginia. He came to Berkeley in 1905 from Colorado. He married Melissa Newkirk. They had a daughter Dixie and a son Quigley. Michael Driver died July 17, 1942, in Berkeley.
