= Brightside Station =

Brightside Station may refer to:

- Brightside railway station, in Sheffield, England
- Brightside, California, formerly Brightside Station
