= Parks Reserve Forces Training Area =

United States Army facility

Parks Reserve Forces Training Area Camp Parks Parks Air Force Base
- Located in Dublin, California
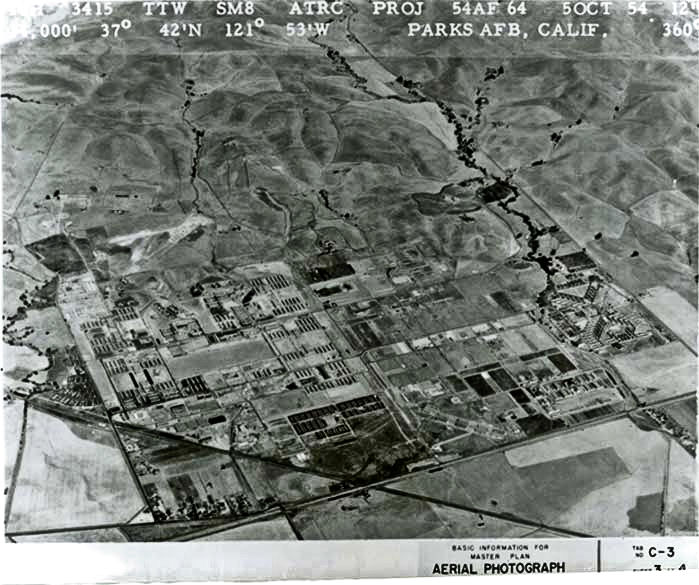
- Parks AFB, CA – 5 October 1954

Site information
- Type: Reserve Forces Training Area
- Controlled by: United States Army

Location
- Coordinates: 37°43′25.66″N 121°54′03.50″W

Site history
- Built: 1943
- In use: 1943 – present

Parks Reserve Forces Training Area (PRFTA), commonly known as Camp Parks, is a United States Army base located in Dublin, California, that is currently an active military and training center for U.S. Army Reserve personnel to be used in case of war or natural disaster.

== History ==
=== World War II ===
Soon after the creation of the Seabees at the beginning of World War II, the U.S. Navy built a West Coast replacement and recuperation center for Naval Construction Battalions returning from overseas. Camp Parks was established on 26 November 1942, having been named in honor of Rear Admiral Charles W. Parks, Civil Engineer Corps (CEC), the World War I chief of the Bureau of Yards and Docks. Adjacent to Camp Parks to the east, was Camp Shoemaker and the U.S. Naval Hospital Shoemaker, also built during the war. The three Navy bases located side by side were called "Fleet City." In April 1945 over 20,000 troops were on the three bases. Seabee had 71 battalions sent through Camp Parks during the war. U.S. Naval Hospital Shoemaker at its peak had 3,031 Seabee patients. The hospital closed in 1946. Camp Shoemaker had a disciplinary barracks for up to 2,097, the men had both work duties and recreational activities. The confined men built cargo nets and wooden pallets for the Navy. The base football team was called the Fleet City Bluejackets.

In 1945, on its huge paved parade ground, Camp Parks could muster more than 20,000 men and hundreds of officers. It was the home for Seabee battalions returning from the Pacific Theater of Operations after a year or more of construction duty. They came to Camp Parks for medical treatment, military training and reorganization. The base housed up to 20 battalions at a time. Most battalions prepared for a second tour in the Pacific. Many Seabees were hospitalized, and those no longer fit for duty received their discharge. After their initial leaves, personnel were given training and battalions were returned to fighting strength.

In 1946, at the end of World War II, the United States Secretary of the Navy disestablished the three facilities, and from 1946 to 1951, the Navy leased much of the land to the County of Alameda for use as Santa Rita Jail. Thousands of Quonset huts and barracks and other buildings were subsequently dismantled through sales conducted by the War Assets Administration.

=== Cold War ===
Camp Parks sat unused until the United States Air Force established it as a basic training center in 1951 during the Korean War, and renamed the facility Parks Air Force Base. The Air Force almost completely rebuilt the base. Base personnel were initially housed in temporary facilities and ate from a field mess. The first group of airmen arrived at Camp Parks in the summer of 1951, and mass training began in March 1952 as the 3275th Air Indoctrination Wing. In 1953, Air Base Defense classes started as the Air Force transitioned the base defense mission from the Army. The Air Force first terminated basic training and then reinstated it that year, all in response to Defense Department budget problems. In 1956, base operations started to change as basic training and the Air Base Defense School moved to Lackland Air Force Base. It is estimated about 6,800 recruits graduated from basic training at Parks AFB between 1951 and 1956.The base transitioned from an Air Training Command facility to a Continental Air Command installation. In January 1957, the 2349th Air Base Wing and the 2349th Personnel Processing Group started operations as part of the Fourth Air Force. The nearby regional Air Force hospital changed its designation at that time, too. Personnel processing continued as the primary base operation until 1959 when the base closed.

Parks Air Force Base was notable as one of the few air force bases without a functional runway on site.

In July 1959, the installation was transferred to the United States Army. From 1959 to 1973, it was operated in a standby status under the jurisdiction of the U.S. Sixth Army, Presidio of San Francisco.

In June 1965, U.S. Coast Guard Squadron One used the range facilities for small arms training in preparation for deployment to Vietnam. Training was completed with pistols, rifles and machine guns under the auspices of the U.S. Navy.

In 1973, the U.S. Army determined that Camp Parks was needed as a mobilization and training center for Reserve Components in the event of war or natural disaster. On 11 December 1980, the Army designated Camp Parks as a semi-active installation, renaming it Parks Reserve Forces Training Area.

==== Radiation experiments ====
From 1959 to 1983, tests were conducted at Camp Parks to determine the effects of radiation on crops and livestock. Various experiments included growing crops in plutonium-enriched soil, exposing sheep to the radioactive isotope cobalt-60, simulating the effects of radiation on ship hulls, exposing an abandoned complex to sand containing lanthanum-140, and exposing dogs to damaging gamma rays. All radioactive material was disposed of on site and some areas were later closed off.

Concerns have been raised about the safety of these experiments. James L. Thomas, a former radiation safety officer at Camp Parks, said, "They wouldn’t be allowed to do that today. It would never be approved. Never." In 1994, the Nuclear Regulatory Commission found forty-six cases showing evidence of radiation experiments on humans, which included at least one experiment at Camp Parks.

However, there has been dispute over these concerns. A 2014 inspection of a small area of Camp Parks found that "there is no evidence that radioactive material or sources were stored or used on the property." Dr. John Ainsworth, former scientific director at Camp Parks, said that there was little controversy over their studies at the time. James Sartor, project manager of several experiments at Camp Parks, said, "There’s no danger in what we did. There were no human guinea pigs involved in any of the experiments."

In a project titled Bombs in Your Backyard, ProPublica found that the Camp Parks site contained "hazardous, toxic, and radioactive waste."

== Current mission ==
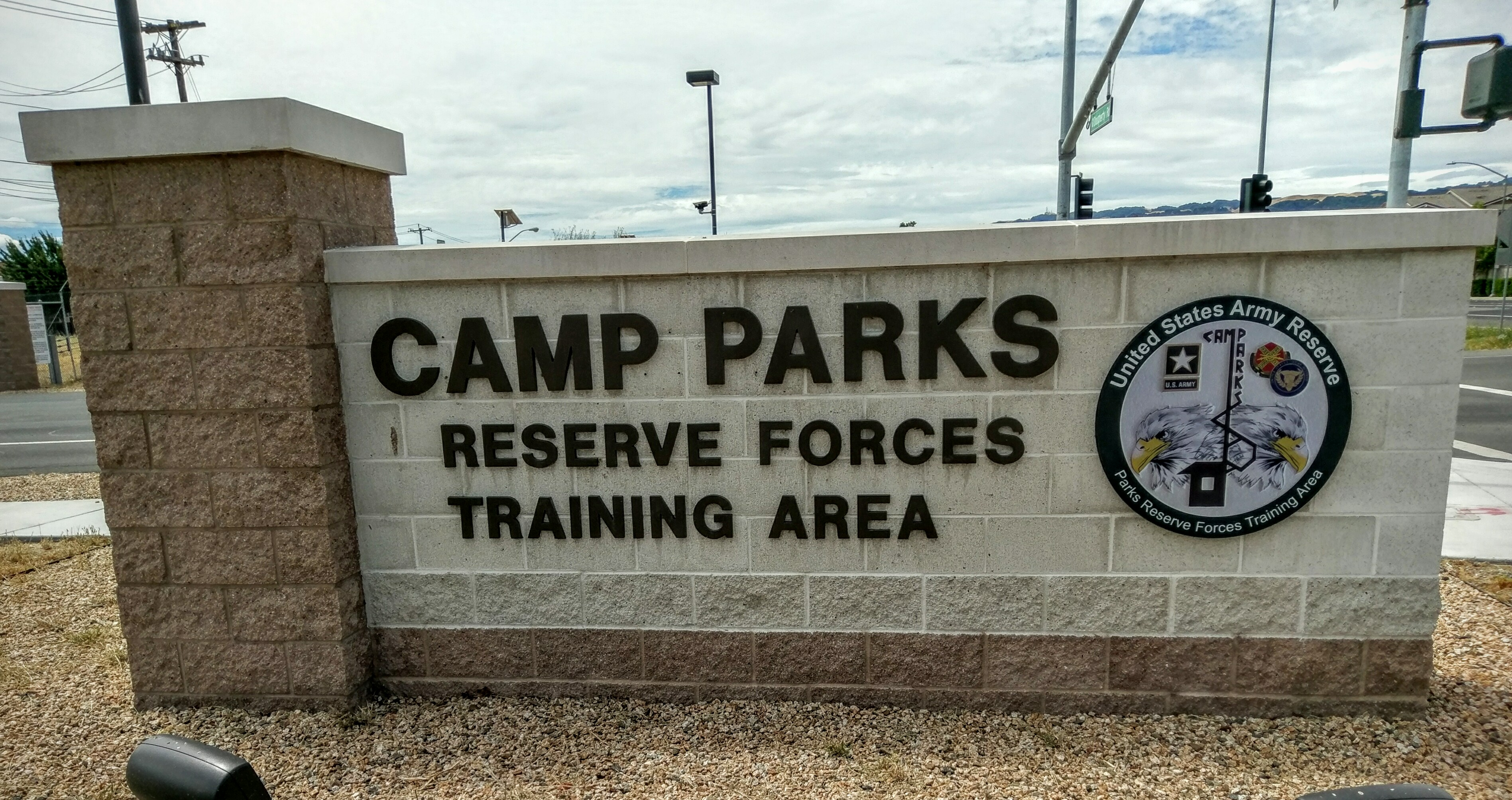
Camp Parks sign in 2016

Parks has a primary mission of exercising the functions of command, training, security, administration, servicing and supply to all troop units, military activities and other governmental agencies assigned or attached.

New and state-of-the-art training facilities have been built and more are planned. In the garrison area are administrative and classroom buildings, upgraded housing, a remodeled dining facility, a modern lodging facility, an informative history center, and other support and training facilities.

Parks RFTA is the only local training facility for more than 11,000 Army Reserve Soldiers in the San Francisco Bay Area where a wide variety of training facilities are available. Reserve Units permanently stationed at Parks RFTA conduct weekend inactive duty training throughout the year, and Reserve Component units travel to the base for their two-week annual training.

== Assigned units ==
- 91st Division (Training Support) – headquarters and various units.
- 104th Division (IT): 4th Bde CSS; 6th Bn PSS; 9th Bn PN/HS
- Regional Training Site-Medical
- Equipment Concentration Site (ECS30) / Area Maintenance Support Activity (AMSA)
- Western Army Reserve Intelligence Support Center (WARISC)
- Navy Seabees (NMCB 18, Detachment 2718)
- Company B, 319th Signal Battalion
- Company B, 1st Battalion, 184th Infantry Regiment (Air Assault)
- Western Information Operations Center (WIOC)
- 352nd Field Hospital
- 820th Hospital Center
- 368th Military Intelligence Battalion
- 191st Army Band
- 1/363rd TSBN,120th IN BDE, 1st Army

== Future changes ==
In its 2005 Base Realignment and Closure recommendations, the Department of Defense recommended relocating the 91st Division to Fort Hunter Liggett.

United States Navy Seabees emblem

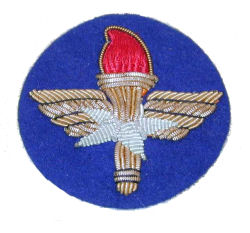
USAF Air Training Command emblem (1950s)

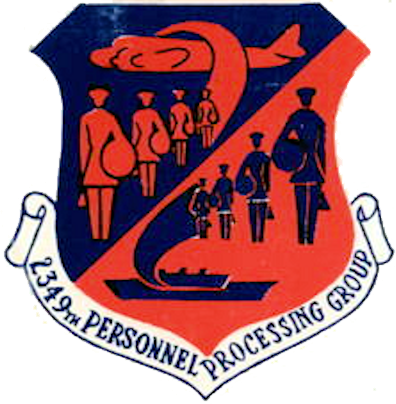
Emblem of the USAF 2349th Personnel Processing Group

United States Sixth Army emblem

== See also ==
- Komandorski Village, California
- California during World War II
- American Theater (1939–1945)
- United States home front during World War II

== Notes ==
Citations

References used

- Larzelere, Alex (1997). The Coast Guard at War, Vietnam, 1965–1975. Naval Institute Press, Annapolis, Maryland. ISBN 978-1-55750-529-3.
