= Komandorski Village, California =

Unincorporated community in California, United States

Komandorski Village
- Unincorporated community
- Location in California Komandorski Village (the United States)
- Coordinates: 37°42′58″N 121°54′32″W
- Country: United States
- State: California
- County: Alameda County
- Elevation: 371 ft (113 m)

Komandorski Village was a temporary low-rent housing development in Dublin, Alameda County, California. It was built to hold the overflow of military personnel and families from Camp Parks. It was sold by the United States government to a housing authority in 1954, and was required to be demolished in 1984. It was located 2 miles (3.2 km) northeast of central Dublin, at an elevation of 371 feet (113 m).
