= Greg Ahern =

American Sheriff

Sheriff of Alameda County, California
- In office January 2007 – January 2023
- Preceded by: Charles Plummer
- Succeeded by: Yesenia Sanchez

Personal details
- Education: Saint Mary's College of California

Gregory J. Ahern (b. 1957 or 1958 (age 68–69)) was the 22nd Sheriff of Alameda County, California, serving for four terms between 2007 and 2023, losing re-election in 2022 by 21.6%.

== Early life ==
Ahern graduated from Moreau Catholic High School. He earned a Bachelor's Degree in Economics and Business Administration at Saint Mary's College of California.

== Career ==
Ahern joined the Alameda County Sheriff's Department in 1980. He was promoted to sergeant at the age of 28 (1985–1986).

In 1998, Ahern investigated the 1998 shooting death of a Sheriff's Deputy in Dublin, California. Three men were convicted in the case.

=== Sheriff ===
In 2006, Ahern ran for sheriff unopposed, replacing Charles Plummer who resigned after five terms in office. Plummer endorsed Ahern for sheriff. Ahern became the 22nd Sheriff of Alameda County.

Ahern initiated the Urban Shield program, an emergency preparedness exercise.

In November 2015, the San Francisco Public Defender's office released surveillance video footage of deputies beating a man, Stanislav Petrov, who had fled deputies on a car chase. In response to the video, Ahern said, "No, I'm not ashamed of my department. I'm saddened that this type of event has caused discredit to our agency, but I love these people like they're my brothers and sisters." Although 11 deputies were on the scene and all of them were equipped with body cameras, only one activated their camera, by accident. In response Ahern vowed to change department policy so that deputies activate their body cameras at all times. Petrov sued Alameda County and won a civil settlement of $5.5 million. Two deputies were charged by the San Francisco District Attorney's office with felonies including assault by a public officer, battery with serious bodily injury, assault with a deadly weapon and several enhancements for great bodily injury and use of a weapon. The case is still ongoing. A third deputy was fired for the alleged theft of Petrov's valuables. Witnesses who saw the beating stated that the deputies offered the wounded man's valuables to them in a gesture to keep quiet.

Ahern came under criticism about conditions at the Santa Rita Jail, where at least 68 inmates died between 2011 and 2020, largely from suicides and overdoses. In 2018, inmates filed a lawsuit alleging insufficient mental health care. A US Department of Justice report released April 2021 found that the jail had become the county's largest provider of mental health services, and that its inadequate provision of care of inmates constituted a violation of their civil rights. In February 2022, a federal judge approved a settlement calling for improved mental health services and staffing, to the objections of some inmates and advocacy groups. The US Department of Justice would monitor the settlement for six years.

After four terms as Sheriff running unopposed, Ahern was defeated by over 21 percent in the June 2022 primary by Yesenia Sanchez, an Alameda County Sheriff's Deputy. Conditions at Santa Rita jail were cited as a factor. Sanchez campaigned on the promises to bring accountability and reform to the department.

== Personal life ==
As of 2008, Ahern lives in Livermore and is married with one daughter.
