= Mendenhall Springs, California =

Unincorporated community in California, United States

Mendenhall Springs
- Unincorporated community
- Location in California Mendenhall Springs (the United States)
- Coordinates: 37°35′18″N 121°38′52″W
- Country: United States
- State: California
- County: Alameda
- Elevation: 1,818 ft (554 m)

Mendenhall Springs is a set of springs that was turned into a resort in Alameda County, California, United States. It is located 9 miles (14 km) southeast of Livermore, at an elevation of 1818 feet (554 m).

William M. Mendenhall established a health spa here in the 1870s, which by 1909 had accommodations for 75 people, from springs that had been diverted through tunnels originally bored for gold prospecting.

== Climate ==
This region experiences warm (but not hot) and dry summers, with no average monthly temperatures above 71.6 °F. According to the Köppen Climate Classification system, Mendenhall Springs has a warm-summer Mediterranean climate, abbreviated "Csb" on climate maps.
