= Charles Plummer (sheriff) =

American politician (1930–2018)

Charles C. Plummer

Sheriff of Alameda County, California
- In office January 1987 – January 2007
- Succeeded by: Greg Ahern

Personal details
- Born: August 17, 1930 Fort Bragg, Mendocino County, California
- Died: March 4, 2018 (aged 87)
- Citizenship: American
- Occupation: Police officer

Charles Plummer (1930–2018) was the 21st Sheriff of Alameda County, California from 1987 to 2007. He worked in law enforcement for 54 years prior to his death.

== Early life ==
Charles C. Plummer was born in on August 17, 1930 in Fort Bragg, California. Plummer was hitchhiking and met a California Highway Patrol officer. The officer told him he'd make a great police officer. As a result, Plummer enrolled in Santa Rosa Junior College's law enforcement academy.

== Career ==
After graduating college, Plummer joined the Berkeley Police Department in 1952. He was a field commander when riots erupted in People's Park in 1969. In 2007, Plummer said: "I wish I would have hit some people harder during the riots. I regret that."

In 1976, Plummer was appointed Chief of Police for Hayward, California.

=== Alameda County Sheriff ===
In 1986, Plummer was elected the 21st Sheriff of Alameda County.

During his tenure, the Alameda Sheriff's Department became the only western law enforcement department to have an accredited bomb squad.

Plummer retired 13 January 2007 after serving five terms as sheriff. Gregory J. Ahern, a 26-year veteran of the sheriff's office, was elected to succeed him. Plummer continued to work one or two days a week at the department's Office of Emergency Services as an unofficial "sheriff emeritus" until his death.

== Later life and legacy ==
Plummer had three children, a girl and two boys. Plummer continued to work two days a week at the Alameda Sheriff's Department after retiring as sheriff. He died on March 4, 2018.

In the immediate wake of his death, his successor, Gregory Ahern, called Plummer "one of the most dedicated and respected law enforcement leaders in our nation" and an "American hero."
