= Hayward Acres, California =

Unincorporated community in California, United States

Hayward Acres
- Unincorporated community
- Location within California Location within the United States
- Coordinates: 37°40′09″N 122°06′43″W
- Country: United States
- State: California
- County: Alameda

Area
  - Total: 0.24 sq mi (0.62 km^{2})
- Elevation: 49 ft (15 m)

Population (2019)
  - Total: 4,266
  - Density: 18,000/sq mi (6,900/km^{2})
- ZIP Code: 94541

Hayward Acres is an unincorporated community in Alameda County, California, United States. It is located in the historic Eden Township approximately one mile (1.61 km) southeast of San Lorenzo. In the year 2019, it had a total population of 4,266.

== Demographics ==
In 2019, there are 4,266 residents within Hayward Acres, among them 57.5% are Hispanic or Latino, 28.6% are unspecified, 17% are African American, 12.6% are Asian, 10.6% are White, 6.6% are multiracial, 2.4% are American Indian, and 0.9% are Native Hawaiian or other Pacific Islander.
