= Dresser, California =

Unincorporated community in California, United States

Dresser
- Unincorporated community
- Location in California Dresser (the United States)
- Coordinates: 37°35′33″N 121°57′21″W
- Country: United States
- State: California
- County: Alameda
- Elevation: 105 ft (32 m)

Dresser (formerly Alston, Dresser Siding and Merienda) is an unincorporated community in Alameda County, California, United States. Its ZIP code is 94536 and its area codes are 510 and 341.

== Geography and background ==
Dresser is located on the Southern Pacific Railroad, 3 miles (4.8 km) north-northeast of downtown Fremont, at an elevation of 105 feet (32 m). The city's name was Merienda until 1915, and then was Alston until 1957. It was established as a station on the Southern Pacific Railroad in 1923 to serve the California Pressed Brick Company in Niles Canyon.

== Current status ==
Reportedly, the location has been used for partying since it was closed in the 1990s. The adjacent "Secret Sidewalk" (Niles Canyon Aqueduct) is also used for such purposes.

== See also ==
- Merienda, California
- Niles Canyon
- Niles Canyon Railway
- Sunol Water Temple
