= Mowry Landing, California =

Unincorporated community in California, United States

Mowry Landing
- Unincorporated community
- Location in California Mowry Landing (the United States)
- Coordinates: 37°30′22″N 122°01′08″W
- Country: United States
- State: California
- County: Alameda
- Elevation: 9.8 ft (3 m)

Mowry Landing (formerly, Mawry Landing and Mowry's Landing) is a former settlement in Alameda County, California, United States. It is located 2 miles (3.2 km) southeast of central Newark on the San Francisco Bay and lies at an elevation of 10 feet (3 m).

Mowry Landing is near the western termini of Stevenson Blvd and Mowry Ave, within the current borders of Newark. It was named after Origin Mowry, a Mormon settler who moved there in 1846. It became a shipping port for produce and grain in the mid 19th century.
