= Frank Madigan =

American politician

Sheriff of Alameda County, California
- In office 1963–1975
- Succeeded by: Thomas Lafayette Houchins Jr.

Personal details
- Born: 1908
- Died: 1979 (aged 70–71)
- Profession: Law enforcement officer

Frank Madigan (1908–1979) was the police sheriff of the Alameda County Sheriff's Office in Alameda County, California from 1963 to 1975. Thomas Lafayette Houchins Jr. served under him during the 1960s Berkeley protests. Sheriff Madigan had the Alameda County Sheriff's Department aid the University of California Police, California Highway Patrol and Berkeley Police during the Free Speech Movement in October 1964. Madigan ordered his officers to help clear protesters from Sproul Hall. During the People's Park protests, sometimes referred to as "Bloody Thursday", Madigan authorized use of buckshot, rather than birdshot, against demonstrators who were throwing bricks at the deputies. In May 1970, after the Kent State shootings, he ordered tear gas dropped from helicopters on the University of California at Berkeley. His orders came from governor of California Ronald Reagan. In the 1970 Alameda County sheriff election, Madigan was opposed by Stew Albert of the Youth International Party. In 1973 Madigan opened the Work Furlough Center, the first incarceration facility in California designed entirely to run work release programs.
