= Yesenia Sanchez =

American Sheriff

Sheriff of Alameda County, California
- Incumbent
- Assumed office January 3, 2023
- Preceded by: Greg Ahern

Yesenia Sanchez (born 1977 or 1978) is the 23rd Sheriff of Alameda County. Sanchez is the first woman and first Latina to hold the office.

== Early life ==
Sanchez was born in Hayward, California. Her father immigrated from Mexico to California as a child. Her mother moved to California from Texas. At the age of 12, Sanchez's family moved to Patterson, California. When Sanchez was a teenager, her parents separated and her family lost their home. Sanchez and her siblings worked to support their family. Sanchez graduated from Patterson High School. Sanchez returned to Hayward as an adult, living out of her car because she could not afford housing.

== Alameda County Sheriff's Office ==
Sanchez started in the Alameda County Sheriff's Office in 1997 as an entry-level technician. In 2001, Sanchez became a sworn deputy. In 2020, Sanchez became division commander overseeing Santa Rita Jail.

== Sheriff election ==
In August 2021, Sanchez announced that she would run for Sheriff of Alameda County. Sanchez campaigned a reform platform to add more resources for inmates, increase transparency of the office, and train deputies to better approach crises. Sanchez criticized the incumbent, Greg Ahern, over multiple lawsuits at Santa Rita Jail concerning the treatment of mentally ill inmates. Sanchez defeated Ahern 52.8%-31.2% percent in the June 2022 primary election, securing a victory and avoiding a November runoff election. Sanchez is the 23rd Sheriff, and the first woman and first Latina to be elected.

== Personal ==
As of August 2021, Sanchez lives in Livermore, California. She is married to her husband, Todd, who retired from the Alameda County Sheriff's Department as a sergeant. Sanchez is a stepmother to her husband's three daughters from a prior relationship.
