= East Pleasanton, California =

Unincorporated community in California, United States

East Pleasanton
- Unincorporated community
- Location in California
- Coordinates: 37°40′25″N 121°49′48″W
- Country: United States
- State: California
- County: Alameda
- Elevation: 384 ft (117 m)

East Pleasanton (formerly, East Pleasanton Siding) is an unincorporated community in Alameda County, California, United States. It is located 2.25 miles (3.6 km) east-northeast of Pleasanton.

== History ==
In 2012 existing land uses of the East Pleasanton planning area consist of the Pleasanton Garbage Service Transfer Station and Recycling Center, the city's Operations Services Center, some remaining storage of materials on the Kiewit site, three former quarry lakes, and vacant land.

Planning started in July 2012, when the City Council appointed an East Pleasanton Specific Plan Task Force to make recommendations for future land use of quarry property. Three years later, citing concerns about the ongoing drought, traffic impacts, school capacity, and appropriately metering growth in the area, the City Council in June 2015 stopped work on the East Pleasanton Specific Plan. "Any future decision to restart the East Pleasanton Specific Plan process shall occur as part of the regular City Council priority setting meetings."

== Geography ==
=== Climate ===
This region experiences warm/hot and dry summers, with no average monthly temperatures above 71.6 °F. According to the Köppen Climate Classification system, East Pleasanton has a warm-summer Mediterranean climate, abbreviated "Csb" on climate maps.

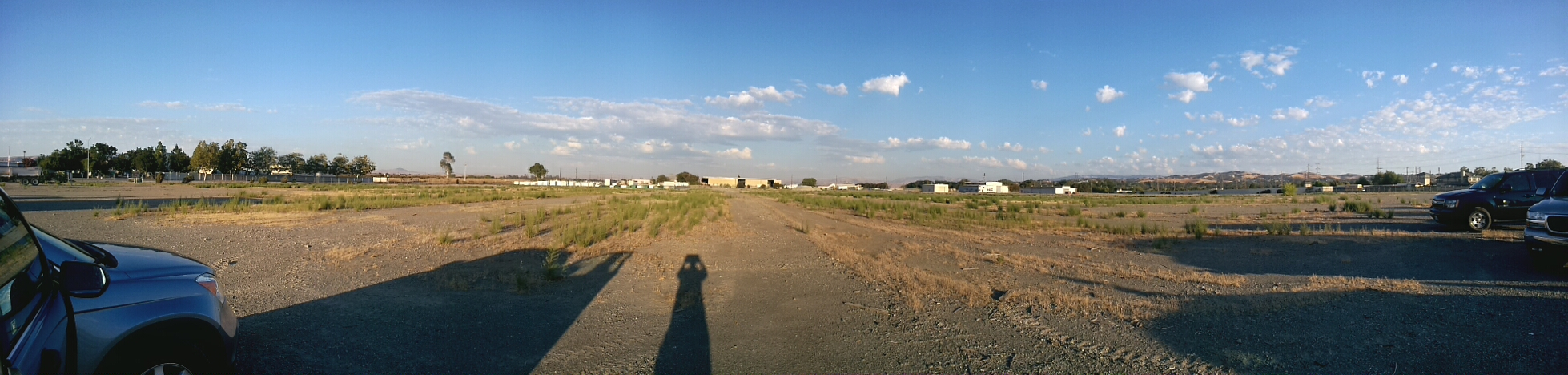
Kiewit property with Pleasanton Garbage Transfer Station
