= Murray Township, Alameda County, California =

Former civil township

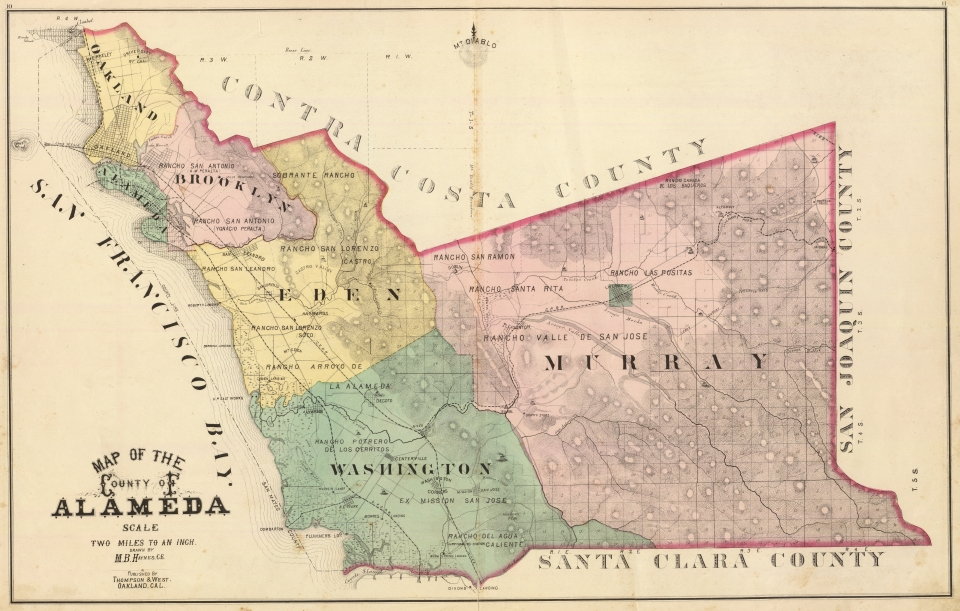
Murray Township (in pink on the right) within Alameda County as of 1878

Murray Township was a township located in what is now the Livermore Valley portion of Alameda County, California, United States, including the present day cities of Livermore, Dublin, and Pleasanton, and the census-designated place of Sunol.

It was named after Michael Murray and created in June 1853, a few months after Alameda County itself was created, encompassing the eastern portion of the county. It was at the time the largest of the six townships in the county.

== History ==
The California gold rush beginning in 1848 drew prospectors from around the world. Many travelled by sea to Alameda County and took the road through Sunol and Livermore valleys towards the mountains.

In 1853, Murray Township was established as one of six Alameda County townships and given a seat on the board of supervisors. In 1902, Pleasanton Township was created from part of Murray township. By 1910, Pleasanton, with a population of 2883, followed by Murray, with a population of 4137, were the least populous of the seven townships.

In its early settlement, the area was mostly used for cattle ranching. The climate proved ideal for wine cultivation, so many landowners planted vineyards from the 1880s onwards.

All the towns in Murray Township remained small and dominated by agriculture until the 1950s, when the population boomed and land was subdivided for developments.

== Notable locations ==
The geographical landforms of the area include Amador Valley (named after José Maria Amador), Livermore Valley (named after Robert Livermore), Sunol Valley (named after Don Antonio Suñol), Alamo Valley, and Tassajara Valley. Arroyo de la Laguna is the major waterway which flows south from Amador Valley into Alameda Creek. Arroyo Valle and Arroyo Mocho feed the Laguna from the mountains to the east.

José Maria Amador was one of the first Spanish settlers to Murray township in 1835, and the town of Amador, which became Dublin, developed from his property. The town of Livermore arose from a station on the Central Pacific railroad in 1869. Corral Hollow, on the eastern border of the county, was a pass in which coal was discovered in 1860. Pleasanton was located in the former Rancho Valle de San Jose, where the population grew rapidly from 1861. Rancho Santa Rita, or Alviso, was located to the east. Altamont was another town with a post office in the region.
