= San Ramon Village, California =

Unincorporated community in California, United States

San Ramon Village
- Unincorporated community
- Location in California San Ramon Village (the United States)
- Coordinates: 37°43′17″N 121°55′48″W
- Country: United States
- State: California
- County: Alameda
- Elevation: 354 ft (108 m)

San Ramon Village is a historical unincorporated community in Alameda County, California, United States. It was located north-northeast of Dublin, at an elevation of 354 feet (108 m). It is now a neighborhood within the city of Dublin.
