= Brightside, California =

Unincorporated community in California, United States

Brightside
- Unincorporated community
- Location in California Brightside (the United States)
- Coordinates: 37°35′57″N 121°55′28″W
- Country: United States
- State: California
- County: Alameda
- Elevation: 207 ft (63 m)
- GNIS feature IDs: 1670302

Brightside (formerly, Brightside Station) is an unincorporated community in Alameda County, California, United States. It is located 2.25 miles (3.6 km) west of Sunol.

== Train station ==
The Brightside Station was a popular train station located in the area. However, it lost popularity and was shut down during the Great Depression.
