= Alameda County Sheriff's Office =

Law enforcement agency in California, US

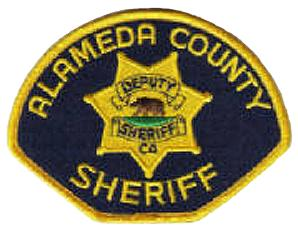
- Patch of the Alameda County Sheriff's Office
- Abbreviation: ACSO

Agency overview
- Formed: 1853; 173 years ago
- Annual budget: 185.7 million

Jurisdictional structure
- Operations jurisdiction: Alameda County, California, U.S.
- Map of Alameda County Sheriff's Office's jurisdiction
- Legal jurisdiction: Alameda County, California

Operational structure
- Headquarters: Oakland, California
- Sworn members: 1000+
- Unsworn members: 600+
- Sheriff responsible: Yesenia Sanchez

Facilities
- Stations: 5
- Jails: 1

Website
- website

The Alameda County Sheriff's Office (ACSO) is a law enforcement agency serving Alameda County, California. ACSO is accredited through the Commission on Accreditation for Law Enforcement Agencies (CALEA), the American Correctional Association (ACA), National Commission on Correctional Health Care (NCCHC) and the California Medical Association (CMA).

As of 2008, the ACSO has approximately 1500 positions, over 600 of which are sworn peace officers.

The Alameda County Sheriff's Office is charged with:

- Providing security to the consolidated superior courts
- Operating the coroner's bureau
- Operating a full-service crime laboratory
- Operating a county jail and detention center
- Conducting a basic academy pursuant to Police Officer Standards and Training (POST) requirements
- Performing civil processes
- Operating the county office of emergency services
- Providing fish and game enforcement
- Operating a marine patrol unit in the San Francisco Bay waters
- Providing patrol and investigative services to the unincorporated areas of Alameda County
- Pursuant to contractual agreements, providing patrol and investigative services to the city of Dublin, Peralta Community College District, Oakland-Alameda County Coliseum complex, Oakland International Airport, Highland County Hospital, social services, and to the Alameda-Contra Costa Transit District

The Sheriff-Coroner is an elected position currently filled by Yesenia Sanchez. The previous sheriff, Gregory J. Ahern, served from 2007 to 2023.

== Detention facilities ==
The Alameda County Sheriff's Office operates one jail. Santa Rita Jail, located in Dublin, California, is the primary facility that houses most people arrested or convicted of crimes in Alameda County. The Glenn Dyer Detention Facility, also known as the North County Jail, located in Downtown Oakland was closed in 2019 for budgetary reasons. Some inmates before they go to Santa Rita Jail they stay at Eden Township Substation, located in San Leandro, California.

== Training and exercises ==
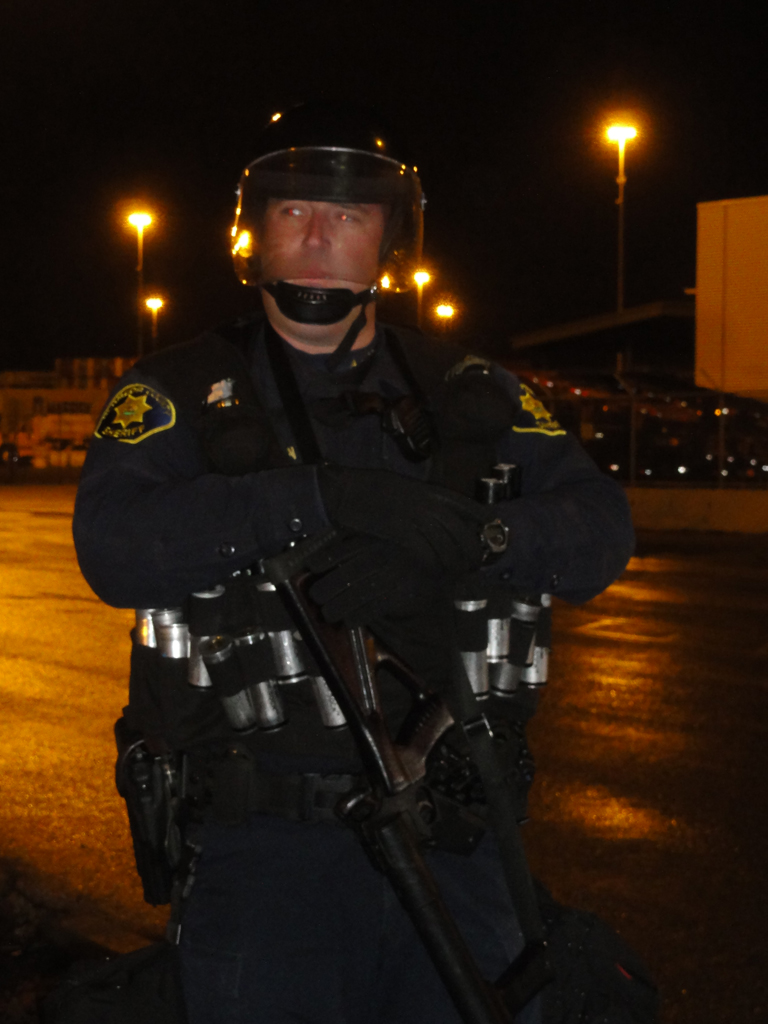
Alameda County Sheriff's Office at Occupy Oakland in 2011

The Alameda County Sheriff's Office operates a police academy and training exercises for the greater law enforcement community in the Bay Area. The Alameda County Sheriff's Office holds an academy for other agencies too like the Stockton Police Department, Hayward Police Department, San Leandro Police Department, the Alameda Police Department etc...

=== Urban Shield ===
Developed by former Alameda County Assistant Sheriff James Baker, Urban Shield was a weapons expo and first response training exercise that began in 2007. The goals of the program were to prepare law enforcement tactical teams, including SWAT teams, to respond to crises and coordinate efforts between law enforcement, fire personnel and medical personnel. An additional purpose was to assess the policies, procedures, organization, equipment and training of attending personnel.

Hosted in the San Francisco Bay Area by the Alameda County Sheriff's Office, Urban Shield was the largest urban full scale readiness exercise in the United States. Police, fire, HAZMAT, EMS and EOD teams from all over the nation trained in multiple scenarios over a continuous 48-hour program. In the first year, scenarios included an active shooter on the UC Berkeley campus, an airplane hijacking, a maritime interdiction, and a 20-mile hike. Since 2012, the Bay Area UASI tests portions of the Regional Catastrophic Preparedness Grant Program as part of the full scale readiness exercise, such as the regional mass fatality plan.

Urban Shield was primarily sponsored by the Department of Homeland Security, and receives additional support from the Bay Area Urban Area Security Initiative, which had a 2014-2016 budget of $6,358,300 from San Francisco City and County funds. $4,901,339 of this was allocated to “Enhance Homeland Security Exercise, Evaluation, and Training Programs,” including management, oversight, and support of the Urban Shield conference. Private corporations including Verizon Wireless, Motorola, SIG Sauer, and Uber offer services and equipment in support of the event, and additional funding comes from private weapons manufacturers such as Lenco and Lockheed Martin. In the past, these manufacturers served only the Pentagon, but have expanded sales to civilian police departments and SWAT teams in recent years.

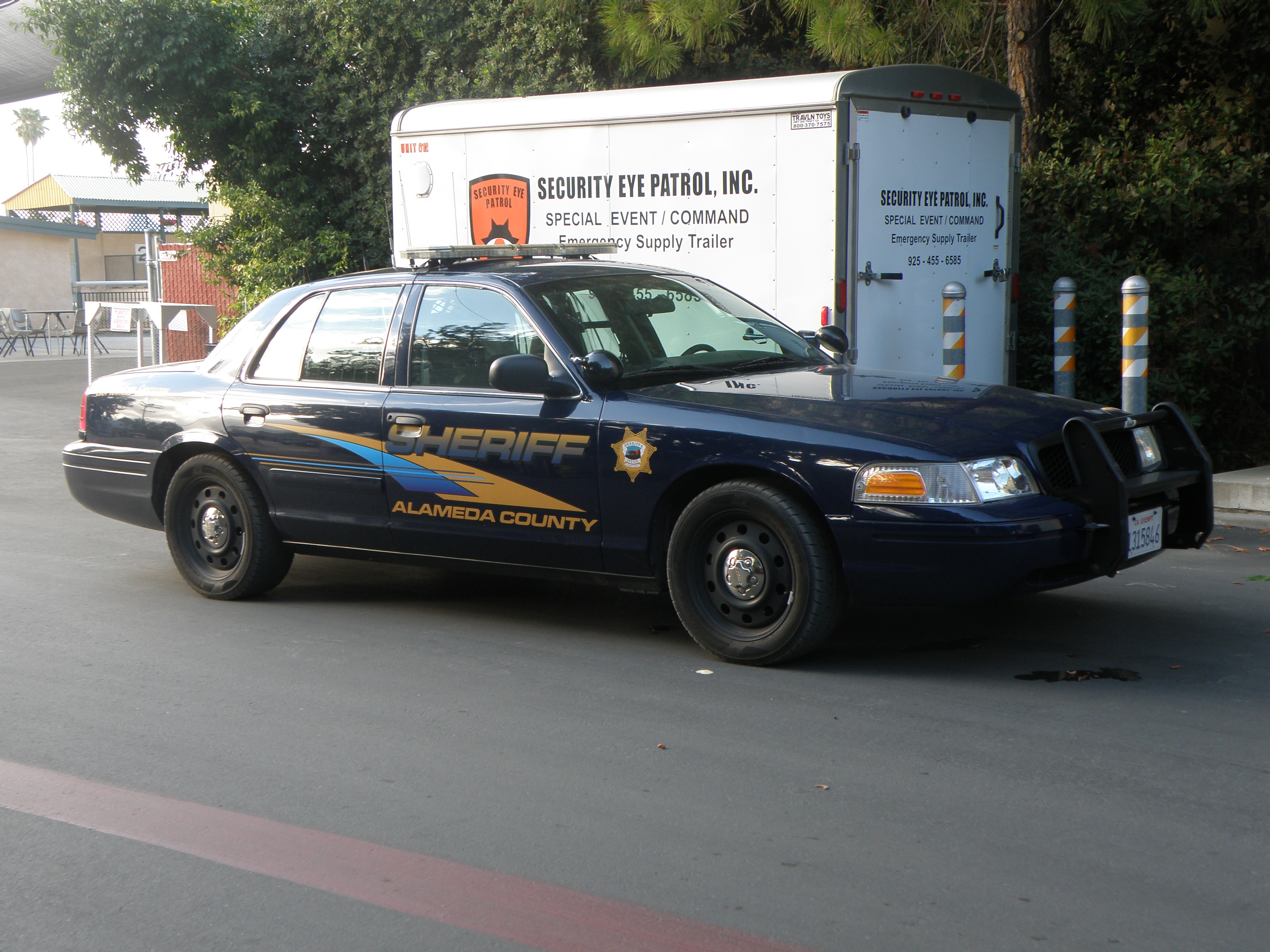
Alameda County Sheriff's Office's Ford Crown Victoria Police Interceptor

Numerous first responders from around the county and the world have participated in or observed Urban Shield. It has attracted international SWAT teams, including those from Singapore, South Korea, Israel, and Bahrain in 2014. In 2010, 2011, and 2013 Israeli elite counter-terrorism unit Yamam won the exercise, breaking and setting records. Boston police commissioner Edward F. Davis credited Urban Shield with helping prepare the Boston Police Department for their response to the Boston Marathon bombing.

=== Opposition and end to Urban Shield ===
There have been protests against Urban Shield prior to and during the event every year since 2013. In 2013, the Urban Shield training program was controversially held on the second anniversary of the removal of Occupy Oakland from Frank Ogawa Plaza. Community activists such as the Stop Urban Shield Coalition recognize Urban Shield as part of a trend of global militarization and escalated police intervention on civilians. Activists also had concerns about Urban Shield expanding direct militarization through increased weaponization, given that Urban Shield included a major arms expo where vendors market advanced, military-grade technology to the SWAT teams and police departments in attendance. In 2014, activist pressure over Urban Shield led to Mayor Jean Quan's announcement that Oakland will not host the military weapons expo in 2015, marking the first such move since Urban Shield started in 2007.

The following year, the 2016 Urban Shield conference was held at the Alameda County Fairgrounds in Pleasanton, CA and was also opposed by protestors, 20 of whom were arrested for trespassing and obstruction. Protesters expressed that the technology showcased at Urban Shield promotes police surveillance and control that specifically targets poor people and people of color. The demonstration included performances and speeches to resist the repression.

Notable controversies of Urban Shield included:

- A "Black Rifles Matter" t-shirt sold at the weapons expo, as a satirical denigration of the Black Lives Matter movement.
- Immigration and Customs Enforcement teams participating in the exercises, despite Alameda County being a sanctuary county.
- The Alameda County Sheriff's Office hosting the far-right Oath Keepers militia at Urban Shield 2017.
- An Urban Shield weapons expo vendor referring to Arab, Muslim, and social justice organizations as "terrorists."
- The use of props depicting enemies in training scenarios as Muslims, African-Americans, and other darker-skinned minorities.

In 2018, the Stop Urban Shield Coalition and community organizations successfully pressured the Alameda County Board of Supervisors to put an end to the program. In 2019, the Board of Supervisors reaffirmed their decision to end the program, and Urban Shield was defunded.

== Crime laboratory ==
The Alameda County Sheriff's Office operates a crime laboratory that is accredited by the American Society of Crime Laboratory Directors. The crime lab, located at the Peralta Oaks, receives and analyzes evidence from law enforcement agencies throughout Alameda County, as well as FBI cases on the West Coast. The crime lab has capabilities in controlled substance analysis, latent fingerprint recovery, ballistics, tool mark identification, and DNA extraction and analysis. Crime lab staff can also serve as crime scene investigators upon request by law enforcement agencies in the county.

== Coroner's bureau ==
The Alameda County Sheriff's Office operates the coroner's bureau in East Oakland. Coroner's pathologists, deputy sheriffs, forensic death investigators, and sheriff's technicians assist law enforcement agencies to determine the cause and manner of death of persons in Alameda County. Additional duties include notifying next of kin, and when needed, the seizure and protection of decedents' assets. In special circumstances the ACSO decides when to refer cases to the public administrator, such as when next of kin cannot be located.

== Topics of controversy ==
In early 2013, Ahern was one of the first law enforcement officers in California to propose purchasing an unmanned aerial vehicle (UAV). Opponents petitioned the purchase, and formed the organization Alameda County Against Drones (ACAD). The ACAD gained nationwide attention resulting in the board of supervisors failing to approve the purchase.

With the June 2014 election, a group called "Elections for the People" expressed concern that for many decades the position of sheriff, while elected, has not been a contested election. The current sheriff, Gregory Ahern, was selected by the prior sheriff, Charles Plummer, and has run twice, unopposed. The 2012 salary for the sheriff of Alameda was over $547,000; this included a base salary of $267,871 and other benefits and payments.

On November 12, 2015, 29-year-old carjacking suspect Stanislav Petrov was pushed to the ground and beaten with batons by two Alameda County Sheriff's deputies, in an alley in San Francisco. The beating was recorded on film. On May 10, 2016, the two deputies were charged with assault with a deadly weapon and battery and assault under color of authority. On April 27, 2017, Petrov's attorney confirmed a $5.5 million settlement payment, $1M of which was paid by Alameda county, the rest by an insurer. The criminal case is on hold due to the coronavirus pandemic.

On June 13, 2019, at the Oracle Arena in Oakland, California, there was a 20-second incident between Alameda County Sheriff deputy Alan Strickland and the president of the winning Canadian team, the Toronto Raptors, Masai Ujiri, seconds after the Raptors had dethroned the San Francisco, California-based two-time defending NBA champion Golden State Warriors as National Basketball Association (NBA) champions winning the 2019 NBA Finals. Sgt. Ray Kelly, a spokesman for the Sheriff's Department, alleged that Ujiri failed to show proper credentials for access to the floor. Sgt. Kelly further alleged that when stopped, Ujiri had shoved a sheriff's deputy, that the deputy had made contact in response, and that Ujiri shoved the deputy back and made contact with his face. Several bystanders and Oracle Arena security personnel intervened to separate the two. After a tense staredown between the men, Ujiri was restrained from approaching the deputy. Raptors player Kyle Lowry then came over to Ujiri and escorted him onto the court to celebrate with the team. The Sheriff's Department did not release body camera footage depicting the start of the incident and announced that their footage had happened to "switch off" when Ujiri allegedly struck the officer. Several witnesses to the altercation disputed the deputy's version of events. In the videos, Ujiri can be seen with game credentials in his hand. However, the NBA had released a media advisory prior to the conclusion of the game stating that only personnel with gold armbands would be allowed on the court due to a visiting team winning. Many of the gold armbands were visible on photographers and executives on the court (including members of the Raptors ownership), but are not visible in any angles of Ujiri during the incident. Following the altercation, the Alameda County Sheriff's Office stated that it would be recommending charges of battery against Ujiri. The investigation ended on September 21. Following a private meeting on October 21, 2019, with Ujiri, his attorneys and Assistant District Attorney Terry Wiley, which was held at the Sheriff's Department, Assistant District Attorney Teresa Drenick announced that the District Attorney's office would not take further action in connection with the incident. Deputy Alan Strickland's body camera footage was released in August 2020. The footage showed Ujiri reaching for his game credentials, but neither the purple trophy credential or the yellow armband credential needed to access the court postgame is seen before the deputy shoved Ujiri twice in the chest. The footage confirmed that the deputy, not Ujiri, initiated the physical contact. Strickland separately sued Ujiri for $75,000, claiming to have suffered a concussion during the altercation. Ujiri countersued, and the two men later dropped their filings.

== Rank structure ==
Title	Insignia
Sheriff	
Undersheriff	
Commander	
Captain	
Lieutenant	
Sergeant	
Deputy	

== History ==
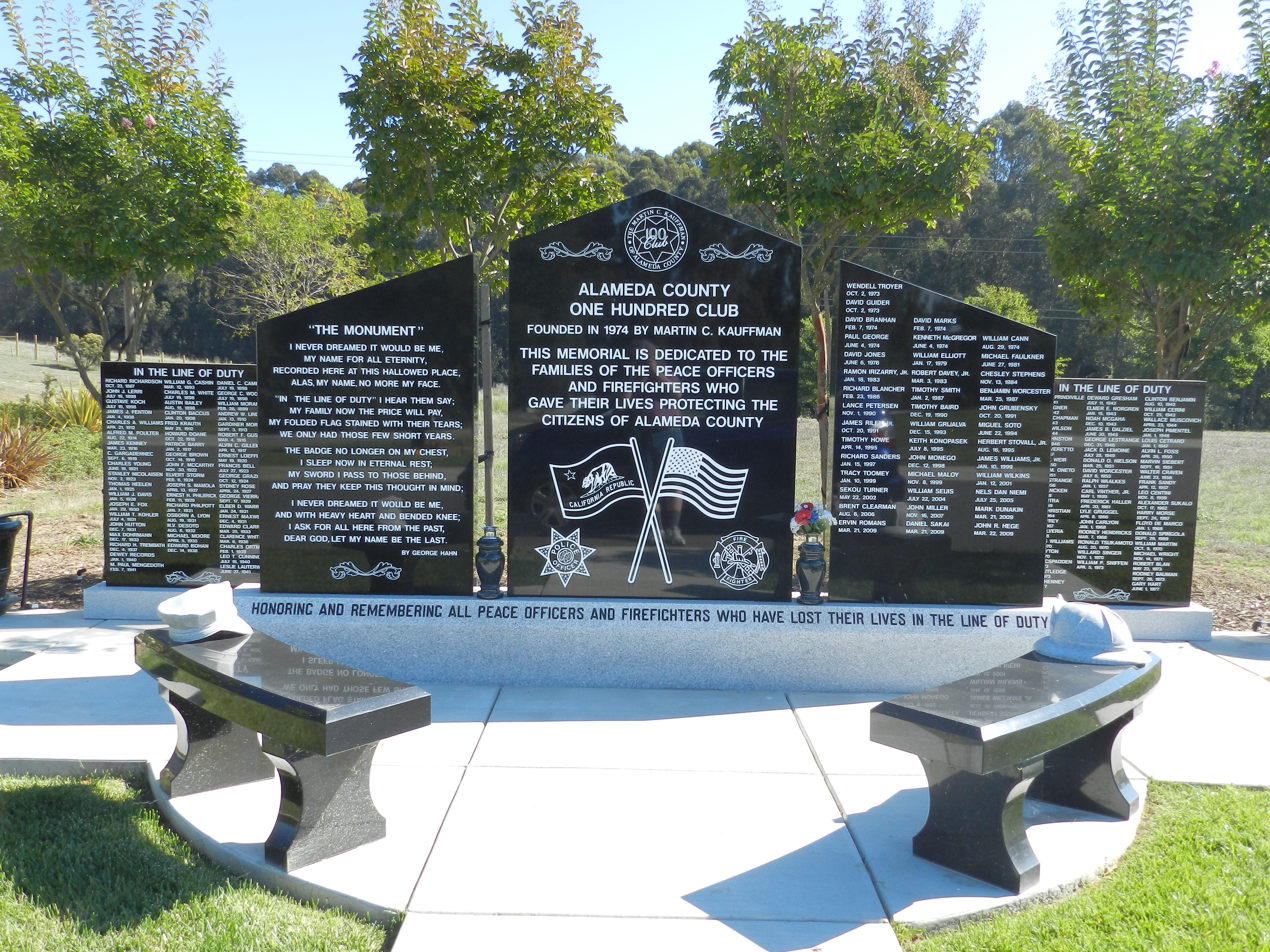
Memorial to fallen officers from Alameda County, including Sheriff's Office forces, Lone Tree Cemetery, Fairview

During the Free Speech Movement riots of the 1960s, the Alameda County sheriff deployed several squads of deputies. Clad in light blue jumpsuits, they quickly became known by anti-government protesters as the "Blue Meanies".

In November 2010, October and November 2011, and January 2012, Alameda County sheriff's deputies were requested by the Oakland Police Department and supplied by the sheriff to assist at protests.

=== Sheriffs ===
- Andrew H. Broder (25 March 1853 – 7 November 1858), first sheriff
- Peter E. Edmundson (7 November 1858 – 7 November 1861)
- Joseph Addison "J.A." Mayhew (7 November 1861- 2 Sep 1863)
- Harry Nicholson Morse (2 September 1863 – 7 November 1878)
- Jeremiah Tyrrel (7 November 1878 – 7 November 1882)
- Charles McCleverty (7 November 1882- 7 November 1893)
- Robert McKilcain (7 November 1893 – 7 November 1896)
- Clifford B. White (7 November 1896 – 7 November 1898)
- Samual B. Allen (7 November 1898 – 7 November 1900)
- Oscar S. Rogers (7 November 1900 – 7 November 1902)
- John N. Bishop (7 November 1902 – 27 February 1905), died in Office
- Frank Thomas Barnet (27 February 1905 – 7 November 1926)
- Burton Becker (7 November 1926 – 7 November 1930)
- Michael B. Driver (7 November 1930 – 28 November 1940)
- Howard Gleason (28 November 1940 – 7 November 1963)
- Frank Madigan (7 November 1963 – 7 November 1974)
- Thomas Lafayette Houchins Jr. (7 November 1974 – 7 November 1978)
- Glen Dyer (7 November 1978 – 7 November 1986)
- Charles Plummer (7 November 1986 – 6 June 2006)
- Gregory J. Ahern (6 June 2006 – 3 January 2023)
- Yesenia Sanchez (3 January 2023 – present)

== Other law enforcement agencies ==
Most of the cities within the county have their own police forces, including the Alameda Police Department, the Berkeley Police Department, the Oakland Police Department, the San Leandro Police Department, the Hayward Police Department and the Fremont Police Department. The municipal police departments provide routine law enforcement services for those cities, with the ACSO providing corresponding services for unincorporated regions of Alameda County and the city of Dublin.

== See also ==
- List of law enforcement agencies in California
