= Alameda County, California =

County in California, United States

Alameda County
- County
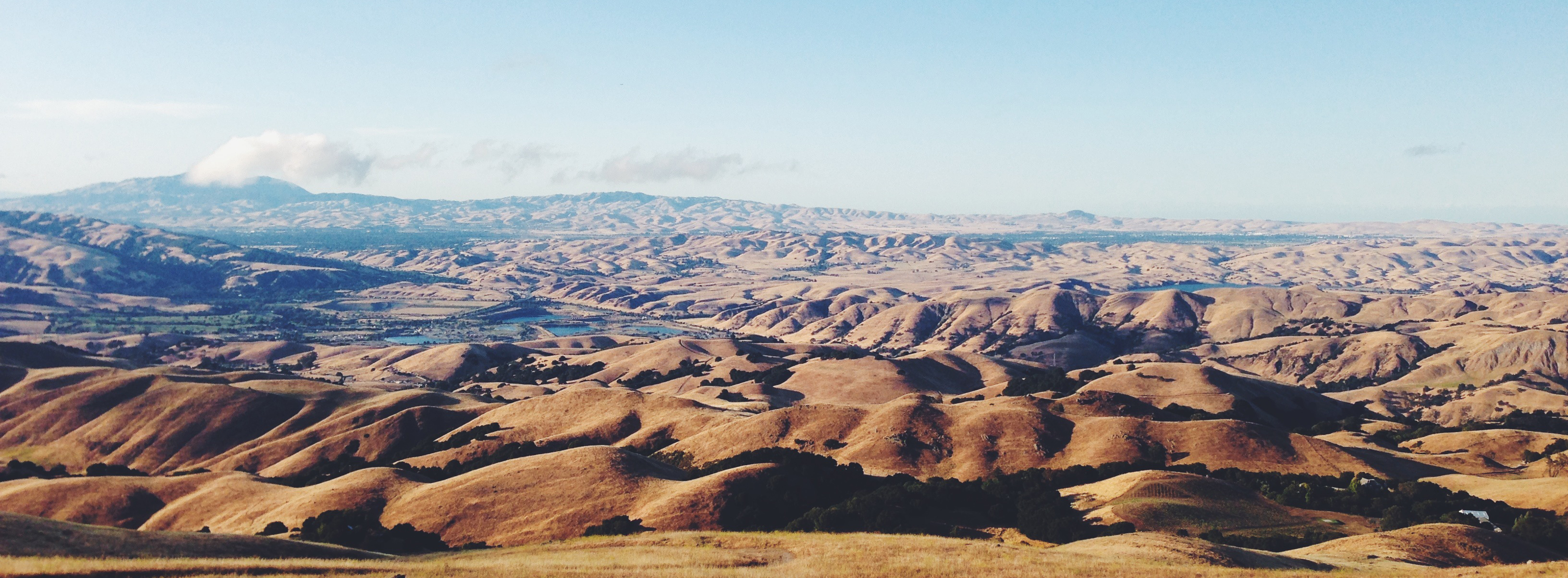
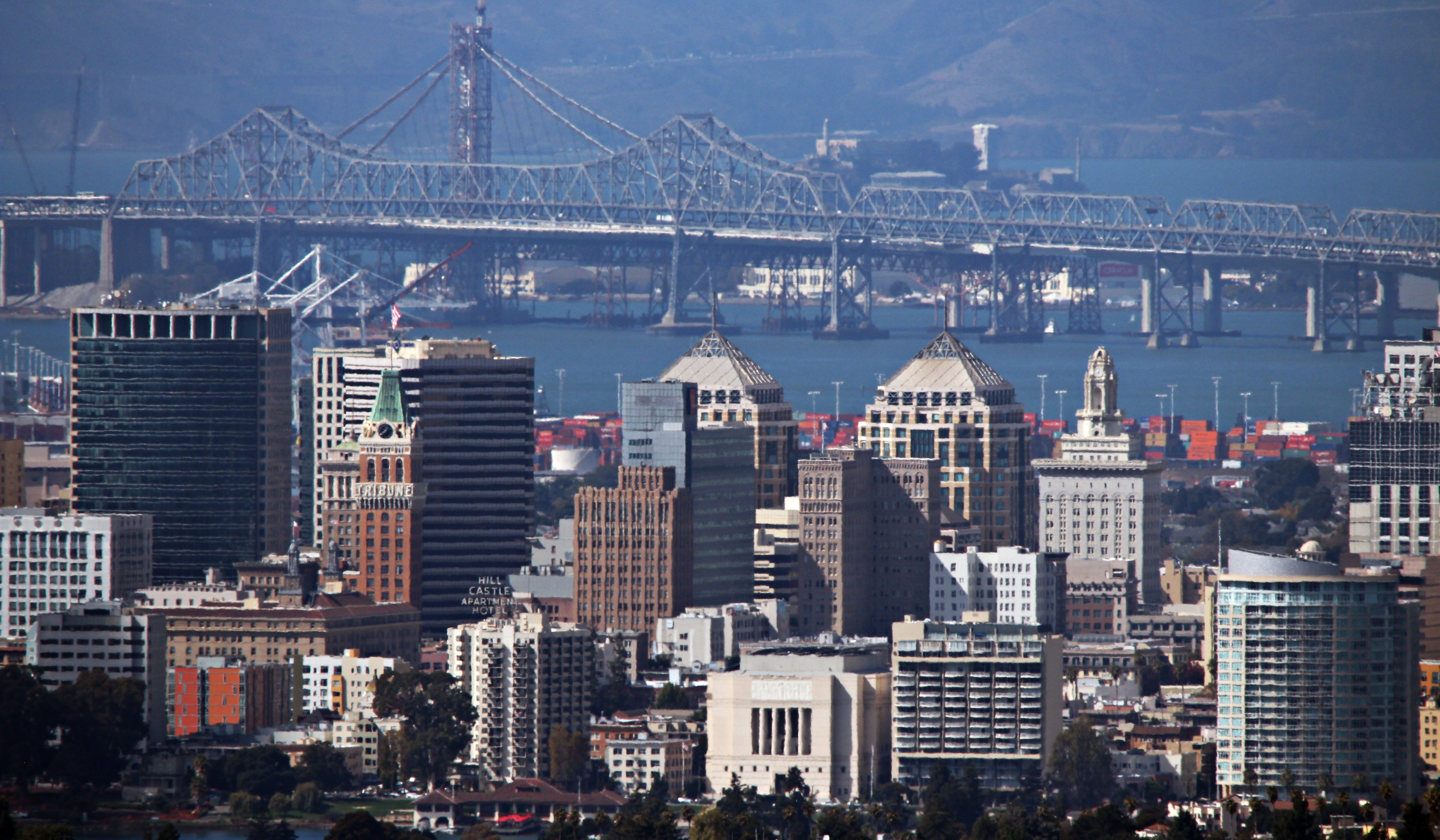
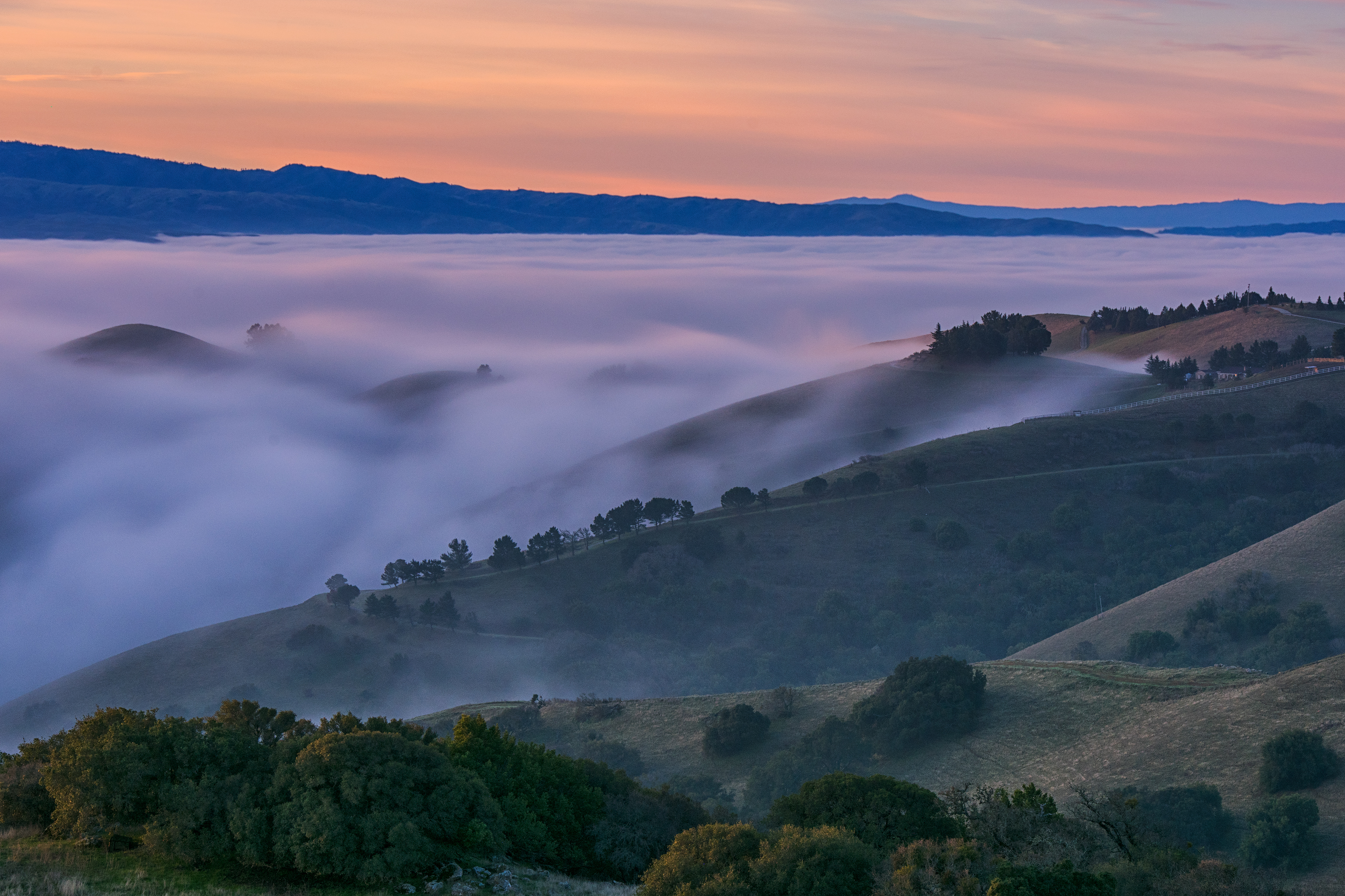
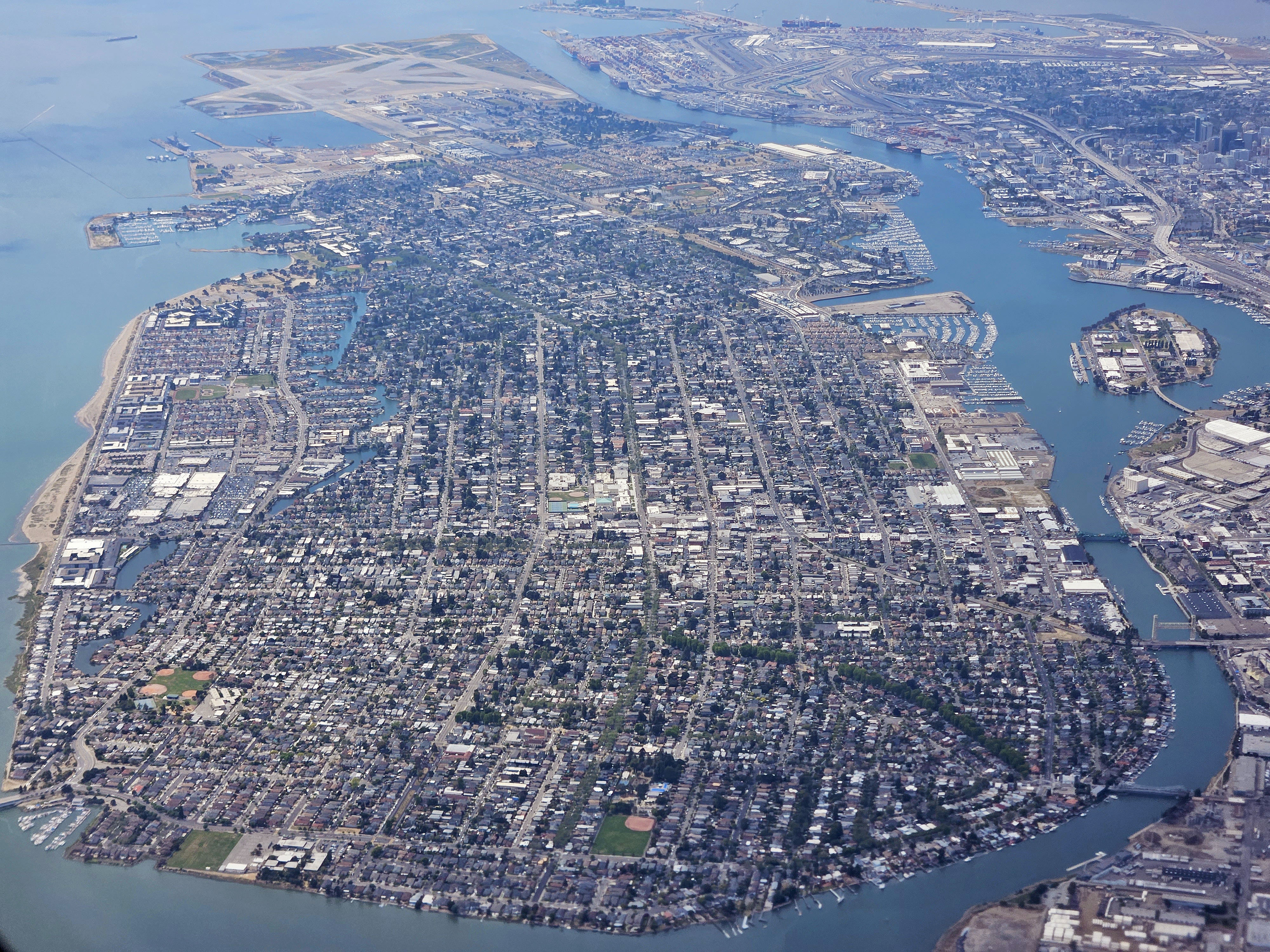
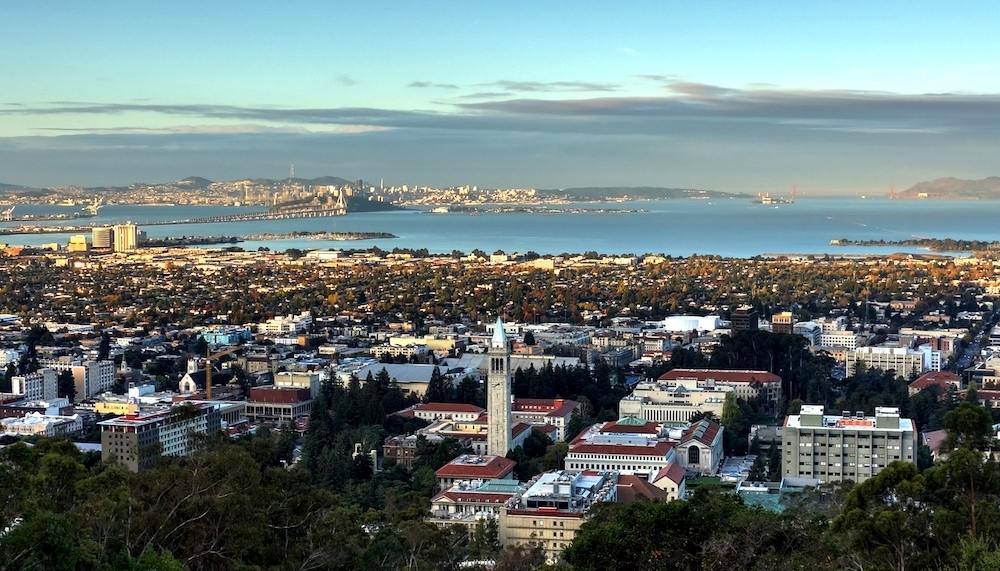
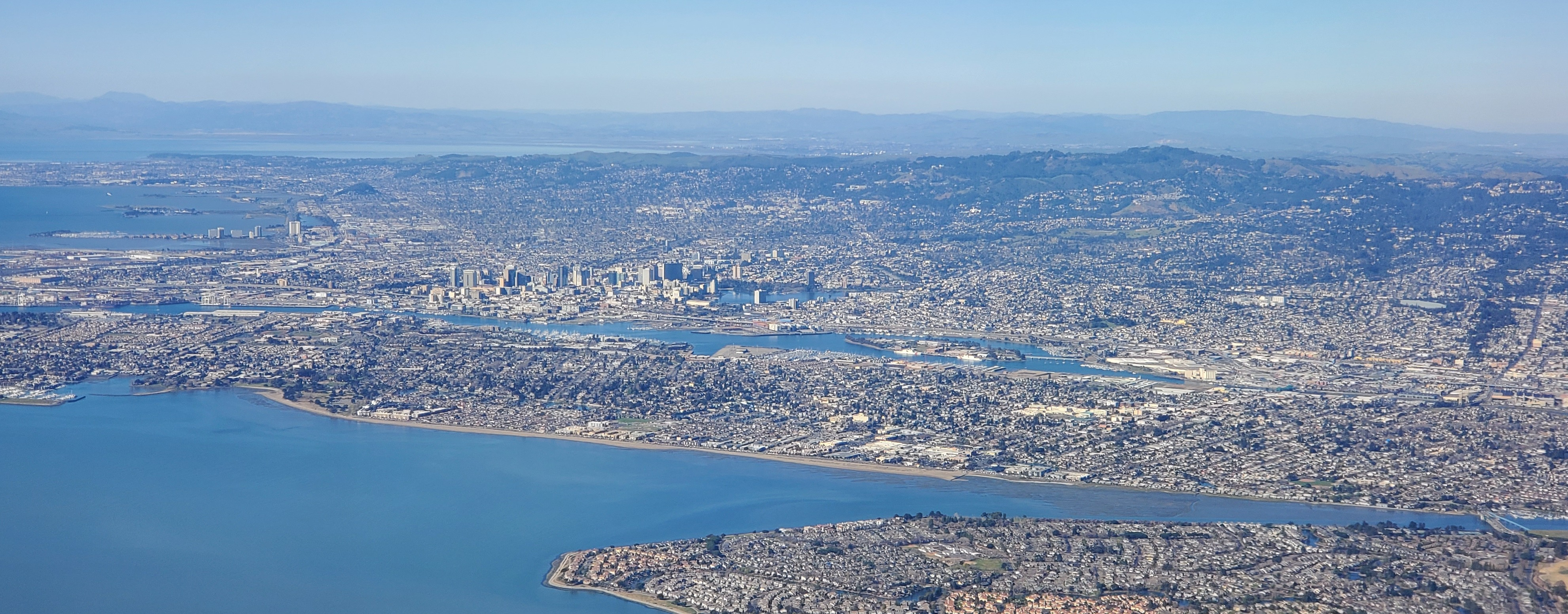
- Mission Peak in the Diablo Range Oakland Livermore Valley Alameda Island Berkeley Alameda County coast on San Francisco Bay

- Flag Seal
- Interactive map of Alameda County
- Coordinates: 37.65°N 121.91°W
- Country: United States
- State: California
- Region: Bay Area
- Incorporated: March 25, 1853
- Named for: Rancho Arroyo de la Alameda (also see Alameda Creek)
- County seat: Oakland
- Largest city: Oakland (population); Fremont (area)

Government
  - Type: Council–CAO
  - Body: Alameda County Board of Supervisors
  - President: David Haubert
  - Vice President: Lena Tam
  - Board of Supervisors: Supervisors: David Haubert; Elisa Márquez; Lena Tam; Nate Miley; Nikki Fortunato Bas
  - County Administrator's Office: Susan S. Muranishi

Area
  - Total: 821 sq mi (2,130 km^{2})
  - Land: 739 sq mi (1,910 km^{2})
  - Water: 82 sq mi (210 km^{2}) 10%
- Highest elevation: 3,843 ft (1,171 m)

Population (2020)
  - Total: 1,682,353
  - Estimate (2025): 1,636,630 ▼
  - Density: 2,280/sq mi (879/km^{2})

GDP
  - Total: $182.539 billion (2024)
- Time zone: UTC−8 (Pacific Time Zone)
  - Summer (DST): UTC−7 (Pacific Daylight Time)
- Area codes: 510, 341, 925
- FIPS code: 06-001
- Congressional districts: 10th, 12th, 14th, 17th
- Website: ACgov.org

Alameda County (/ˌæləˈmiːdə/ AL-ə-MEE-də) is located in the U.S. state of California. As of the 2020 census, the population was 1,682,353, making it the 7th-most populous county in the state and 21st most populous nationally. The county seat is Oakland. Alameda County is in the San Francisco Bay Area, occupying much of the East Bay region.

The Spanish word alameda means either "a grove of poplar trees" or "a tree lined street". The name was originally used to describe the Arroyo de la Alameda; the willow and sycamore trees along the banks of the river reminded the early Spanish explorers of a road lined with trees.

Alameda County is part of the San Francisco–Oakland–Fremont, CA metropolitan statistical area and the San Jose–San Francisco–Oakland, CA combined statistical area.

== History ==
The county was formed on March 25, 1853, from a large portion of Contra Costa County and a smaller portion of Santa Clara County.

The county seat at the time of the county's formation was located at Alvarado, now part of Union City. In 1856, it was moved to San Leandro, where the county courthouse was destroyed by the devastating 1868 quake on the Hayward Fault. The county seat was then re-established in the town of Brooklyn from 1872 to 1875. Brooklyn is now part of Oakland, which has been the county seat since 1873.

Much of what is now an intensively urban region was initially developed as a trolley car suburb of San Francisco in the late 19th and early 20th centuries. The Key System moved commuters to and from the Key System Mole, where ferries bridged the gap across San Francisco Bay.

The historical progression from Native American tribal lands to Spanish then Mexican ranches, then to farms, ranches, and orchards, then to multiple city centers and suburbs, is shared with the adjacent and closely associated Contra Costa County. Prior to European settlement, the county was under the inhabitance of Ohlone Indians until 1820 when Luis Peralta received a land grant that included parts of different cities within the county and later divided up between his four children.

== Law, government and politics ==
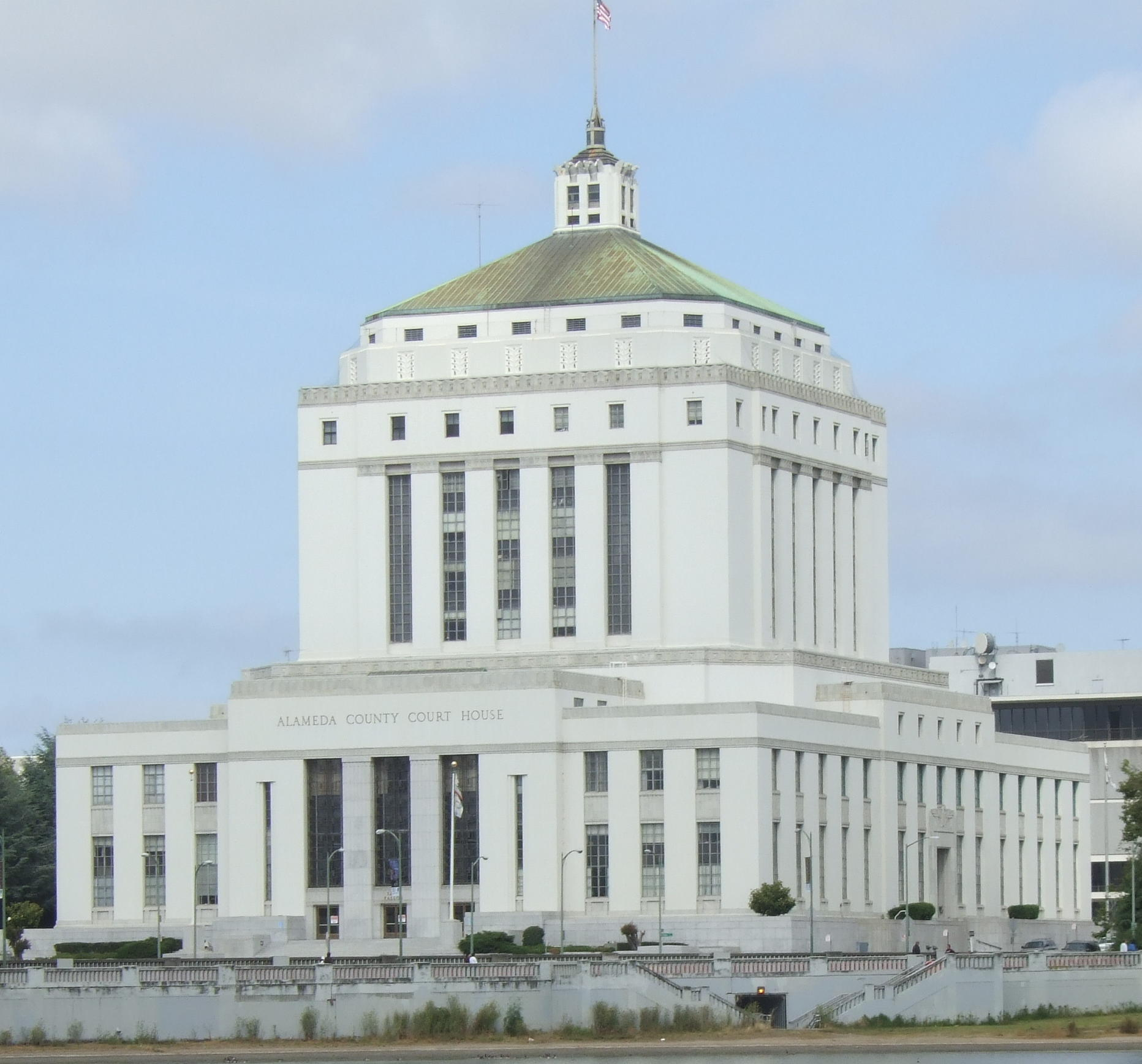
René C. Davidson Courthouse, Alameda County Superior Court, Oakland, in June 2009

=== Government ===
The Government of Alameda County is defined and authorized under the California Constitution, California law, and the Charter of the County of Alameda. Much of the Government of California is in practice the responsibility of county governments such as the Government of Alameda County, while municipalities such as the City of Oakland and the City of Berkeley provide additional, often non-essential services. The County government provides countywide services such as elections and voter registration, law enforcement, jails, vital records, property records, tax collection, and public health. In addition it is the local government for all unincorporated areas, and provides services such as law enforcement to some incorporated cities under a contract arrangement.

It is composed of the elected five-member Alameda County Board of Supervisors (BOS) as the county legislature, several other elected offices and officers including the Sheriff, the District Attorney, Assessor, Auditor-Controller/County Clerk/Recorder, Treasurer/Tax Collector, and numerous county departments and entities under the supervision of the County Administrator. In addition, several entities of the government of California have jurisdiction conterminous with Alameda County, such as the Alameda County Superior Court.

As of 2026, the supervisors are:

- David Haubert (President), district 1,
- Elisa Márquez, district 2,
- Lena Tam (Vice President), district 3,
- Nate Miley, district 4, and
- Nikki Fortunato Bas, district 5.

The Board elects a president who presides at all meetings of the Board and appoints committees to handle work involving the major programs of the county. If the president is absent for a meeting, the vice president shall be responsible. A Board election occurs every two years for these positions. Supervisor Carson is serving currently as president; Supervisor Miley is vice president.

The county's law enforcement is overseen by an elected Sheriff/Coroner and an elected District Attorney. The Sheriff supervises the deputies of the Alameda County Sheriff's Office, whose primary responsibilities include policing unincorporated areas of the county and cities within the county which contract with the Sheriff's Office for police services; providing security and law enforcement for county buildings including courthouses, the county jail and other county properties; providing support resources, such as a forensics laboratory and search and rescue capabilities, to other law enforcement agencies throughout the county; and serving the process of the county's Superior Court system. The District Attorney's office is responsible for prosecuting all criminal violations of the laws of the state of California, the county, or its constituent municipalities, in the Alameda County Superior Court. The current Sheriff is Yesenia Sanchez, who was elected in 2022, succeeding Greg Ahern, who had served in the post for 16 years. The Sheriff's Office operates two jails: Santa Rita Jail in Dublin, and Glenn E. Dyer Detention Facility in downtown Oakland.

In 2009, Nancy E. O'Malley was appointed Alameda County district attorney after Tom Orloff retired. She served two terms and did not run for reelection in 2022. Pamela Price was elected as district attorney in 2022.

The Alameda County Fire Department (ACFD) was formed on July 1, 1993, as a dependent district, with the Board of Supervisors as its governing body. Municipal and specialized fire departments have been consolidated into the ACFD over the years. 1993 brought in the Castro Valley and Eden Consolidated FD, and the County Fire Patrol. San Leandro joined in 1995, Dublin in 1997, Lawrence Berkeley National Laboratory in 2002, Lawrence Livermore National Laboratory in 2007, The Alameda County Regional Emergency Communications Center in 2008, and Newark and Union City in 2010. Emeryville joined the ACFD in 2012.

The Alameda County Water District is a special district within Alameda County created to distribute water, but it is not operated by Alameda County administrators. It is operated by an elected board of directors.

Alameda County Superior Court operates in twelve separate locations throughout the county, with its central René C. Davidson Courthouse located in Oakland near Lake Merritt. Most major criminal trials and complex civil cases are heard at this location or in courtrooms within the County Administration Building across the street.

=== State and federal representation ===
In the California State Assembly, Alameda County is split between five districts:

- the 14th Assembly district, represented by Democrat Buffy Wicks
- the 16th Assembly district, represented by Democrat Rebecca Bauer-Kahan
- the 18th Assembly district, represented by Democrat Mia Bonta
- the 20th Assembly district, represented by Democrat Liz Ortega
- the 24th Assembly district, represented by Democrat Alex Lee

In the California State Senate, the county is split between four districts:

- the 5th senatorial district, represented by Democrat Jerry McNerney
- the 7th senatorial district, represented by Democrat Jesse Arreguín
- the 9th senatorial district, represented by Democrat Tim Grayson
- the 10th senatorial district, seat currently vacant

In the United States House of Representatives, the county is split between four districts:

- California's 10th congressional district, represented by Democrat Mark DeSaulnier
- California's 12th congressional district, represented by Democrat Lateefah Simon
- California's 14th congressional district, represented by Democrat Aisha Wahab
- California's 17th congressional district, represented by Democrat Ro Khanna

=== Politics ===
Since 1932, Alameda County has been a stronghold of the Democratic Party, with Dwight Eisenhower being the only Republican presidential nominee to have carried the county since. Prior to 1932, the county had been a Republican stronghold. Piedmont resident William F. Knowland was the Republican U.S. Senate Leader from 1953 to 1959. Even when Ronald Reagan won the national popular vote by an 18.3% margin in 1984, Walter Mondale won Alameda County by a larger margin. In 2004 it voted for John Kerry, who won over 75% of the vote. Every city and town voted Democratic. George H.W. Bush in 1988 was the last Republican to break 30% of the county's vote and Ronald Reagan in 1984 was the last to break 40% of the vote (carrying 40.01%).

United States presidential election results for Alameda County, California
Year	Republican		Democratic		Third party(ies)	
Year	No.	%	No.	%	No.	%
1880	5,899	59.65%	3,894	39.38%	96	0.97%
1884	7,471	60.26%	4,734	38.18%	193	1.56%
1888	8,840	57.18%	5,693	36.82%	928	6.00%
1892	8,792	47.60%	7,114	38.52%	2,564	13.88%
1896	13,429	60.43%	8,394	37.77%	400	1.80%
1900	14,324	64.64%	6,677	30.13%	1,158	5.23%
1904	19,065	70.32%	4,399	16.23%	3,646	13.45%
1908	21,380	64.24%	7,110	21.36%	4,793	14.40%
1912	0	0.00%	24,418	36.75%	42,034	63.25%
1916	51,417	50.34%	43,748	42.84%	6,966	6.82%
1920	73,177	69.11%	21,468	20.27%	11,244	10.62%
1924	81,454	61.48%	8,020	6.05%	43,016	32.47%
1928	118,539	65.42%	60,875	33.60%	1,780	0.98%
1932	89,303	43.68%	106,388	52.04%	8,761	4.29%
1936	82,352	35.09%	149,323	63.63%	3,011	1.28%
1940	116,961	43.56%	148,224	55.21%	3,311	1.23%
1944	122,982	41.83%	169,631	57.70%	1,374	0.47%
1948	150,588	46.57%	154,549	47.80%	18,194	5.63%
1952	201,976	52.69%	178,239	46.50%	3,079	0.80%
1956	192,911	52.40%	174,033	47.27%	1,187	0.32%
1960	183,354	45.61%	217,172	54.02%	1,474	0.37%
1964	142,998	33.46%	283,833	66.42%	509	0.12%
1968	153,285	37.63%	219,545	53.90%	34,519	8.47%
1972	201,862	42.84%	259,254	55.02%	10,079	2.14%
1976	155,280	38.09%	235,988	57.89%	16,413	4.03%
1980	158,531	37.96%	201,720	48.30%	57,366	13.74%
1984	192,408	40.01%	282,041	58.65%	6,425	1.34%
1988	162,815	33.99%	310,283	64.78%	5,899	1.23%
1992	109,292	20.62%	334,224	63.04%	86,629	16.34%
1996	106,581	23.07%	303,903	65.77%	51,560	11.16%
2000	119,279	24.13%	342,889	69.36%	32,168	6.51%
2004	130,911	23.29%	422,585	75.18%	8,594	1.53%
2008	119,555	19.25%	489,106	78.76%	12,368	1.99%
2012	108,182	18.16%	469,684	78.85%	17,776	2.98%
2016	95,922	14.66%	514,842	78.69%	43,502	6.65%
2020	136,309	17.70%	617,659	80.21%	16,102	2.09%
2024	140,789	21.02%	499,551	74.57%	29,567	4.41%

On November 4, 2008, Alameda County voted 61.92% against Proposition 8, which won statewide, and which amended the California Constitution to ban same-sex marriage. The county garnered the sixth highest "no" vote, by percentage, of all California counties, and was the second largest county, by total voter turnout, to vote against it.

==== Voter registration statistics as of October 24, 2022 ====
Population and registered voters
Total eligible population	1,140,774	
Registered voters (Note: Percentage of registered voters with respect to total population. Percentages of party members with respect to registered voters follow.)	931,130	81.6%
Democratic	562,093	60.4%
Republican	100,977	10.8%
Democratic–Republican spread	+461,116	+49.6%
American Independent	21,621	2.3%
Libertarian	6,351	0.6%
Green	5,628	0.6%
Peace and Freedom	4,340	0.4%
Unknown	26	0.0%
Other	5,686	0.6%
No party preference	224,408	24.1%

===== Cities by population and voter registration =====
Cities by population and voter registration as of 2013
City	Population	Registered voters	Democratic	Republican	D–R spread	Other	No party preference
Alameda	73,239	59.7%	55.0%	14.2%	+40.8%	10.0%	20.8%
Albany	18,217	59.1%	64.0%	6.5%	+57.5%	11.8%	18.9%
Berkeley	111,008	72.9%	64.7%	4.4%	+60.3%	15.3%	17.0%
Dublin	44,171	52.7%	42.7%	24.6%	+18.1%	14.3%	21.3%
Emeryville	9,698	64.7%	59.6%	7.6%	+52.0%	15.3%	19.5%
Fremont	211,748	47.9%	46.4%	17.5%	+28.9%	12.2%	26.0%
Hayward	142,936	43.7%	60.1%	12.7%	+47.4%	11.0%	18.4%
Livermore	79,710	61.5%	39.4%	33.1%	+6.3%	12.4%	18.2%
Newark	42,322	48.6%	53.9%	16.6%	+37.3%	10.7%	21.1%
Oakland	389,397	55.4%	66.7%	5.9%	+60.8%	12.1%	16.9%
Piedmont	10,640	79.7%	56.0%	19.6%	+36.4%	8.4%	17.9%
Pleasanton	69,220	61.5%	38.2%	31.8%	+6.4%	12.0%	20.5%
San Leandro	83,877	50.9%	58.7%	13.7%	+45.0%	10.2%	19.5%
Union City	68,830	48.6%	54.9%	13.1%	+41.8%	10.5%	23.3%

== Geography and climate ==
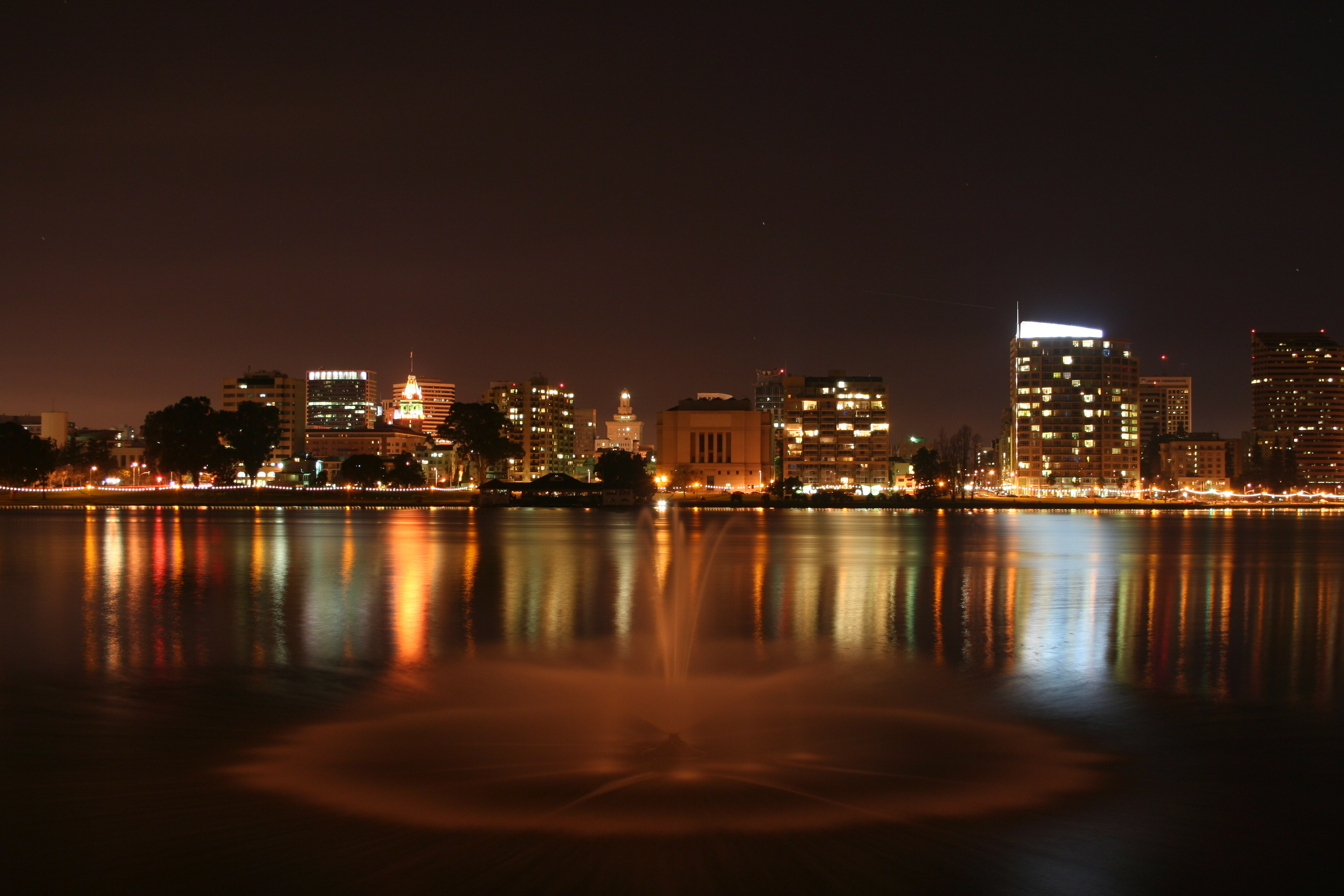
View of downtown Oakland looking west across Lake Merritt

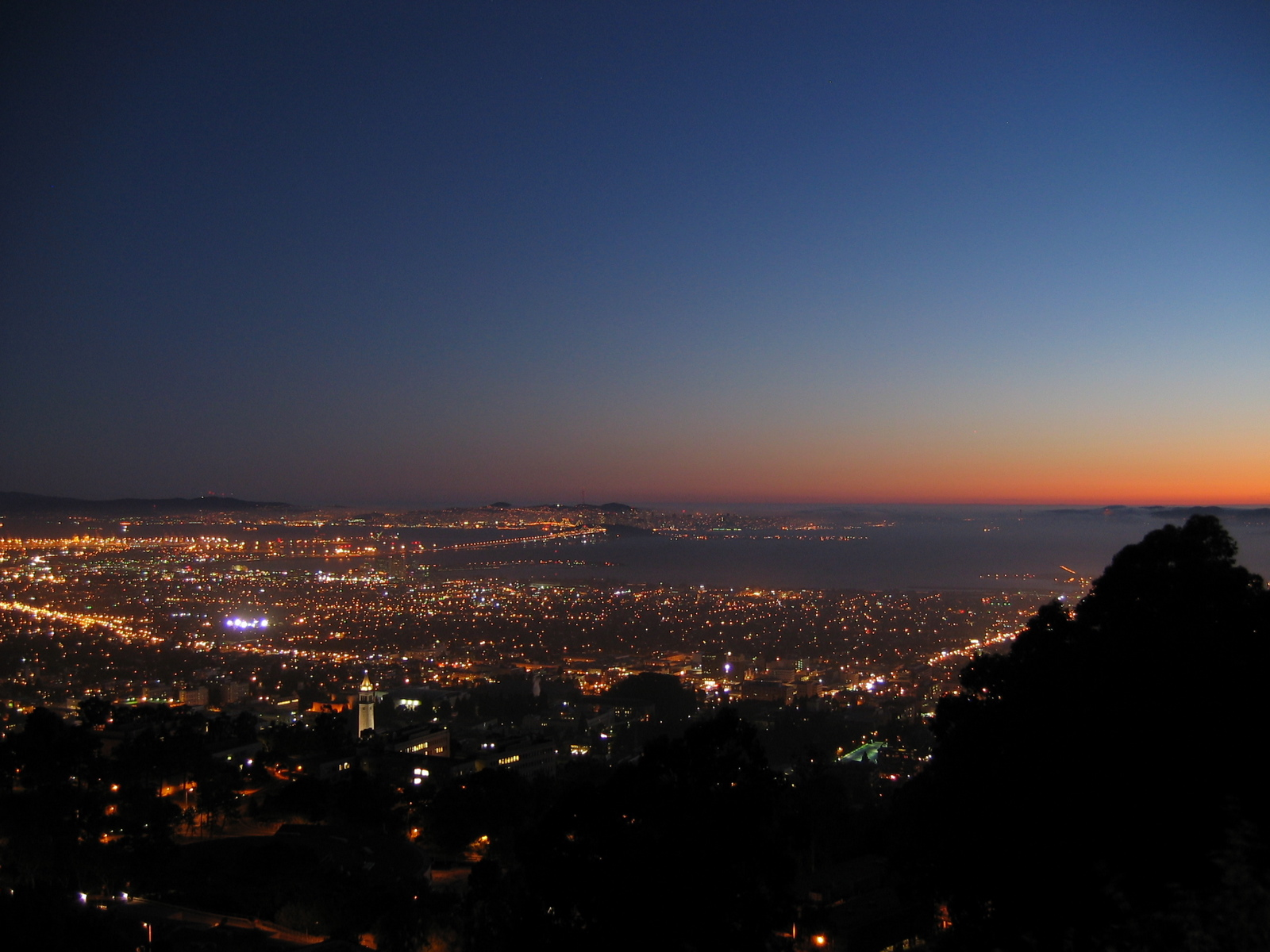
View of Berkeley and the San Francisco Bay at nightfall

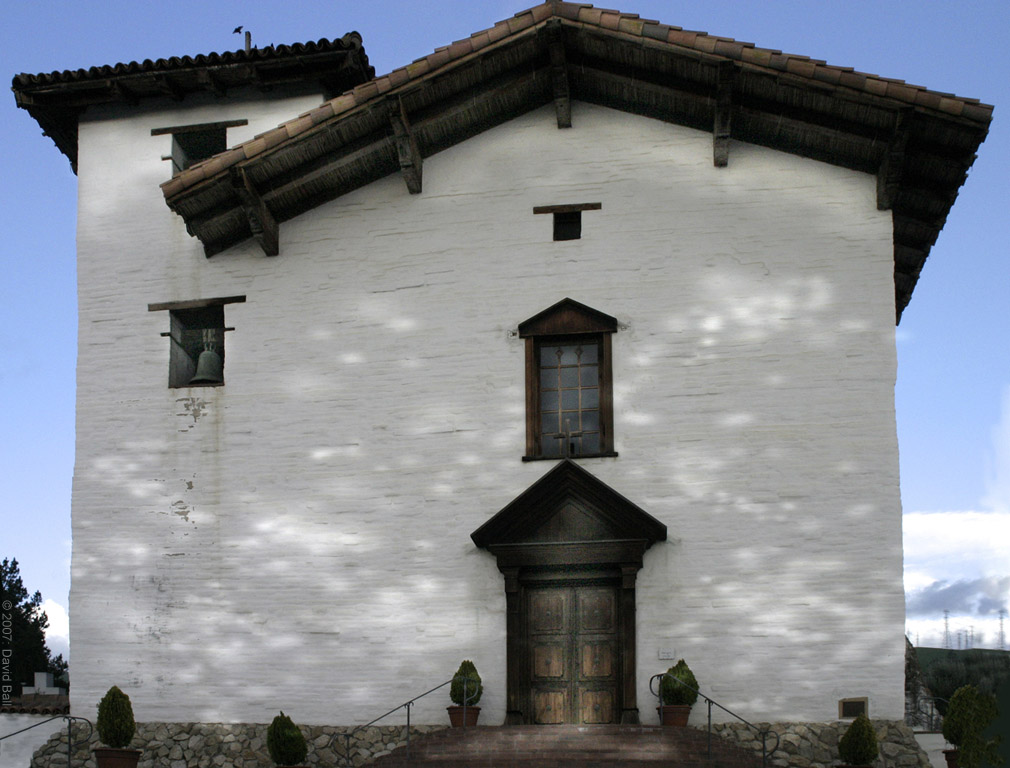
The reconstructed mission at Mission San José (located in Fremont)

According to the U.S. Census Bureau, the county has a total area of 821 square miles (2,130 km^{2}), of which 739 square miles (1,910 km^{2}) is land and 82 square miles (210 km^{2}) (10%) is water. The San Francisco Bay borders the county on the west.

The crest of the Berkeley Hills forms part of the northeastern boundary and reaches into the center of the county. A coastal plain several miles wide lines the bay; and is Oakland's most populous region. Livermore Valley lies in the eastern part of the county. Amador Valley abuts the western edge of Livermore Valley and continues west to the Pleasanton Ridge. The ridges and valleys of the Diablo Range, containing the county's highest peaks, cover the very sparsely populated southeast portion of the county.

The Hayward Fault, a major branch of the San Andreas Fault to the west, runs through the most populated parts of Alameda County, while the Calaveras Fault runs through the southeastern part of the county.

The areas near the Bay itself have a maritime warm-summer Mediterranean climate, whereas behind the mountains, summers are significantly warmer. The climate charts below are for Oakland and inland Livermore.

Climate data for Oakland Museum (1981–2010 normals, extremes 1970–present)
Month	Jan	Feb	Mar	Apr	May	Jun	Jul	Aug	Sep	Oct	Nov	Dec	Year
Record high °F (°C)	78 (26)	82 (28)	88 (31)	97 (36)	105 (41)	106 (41)	103 (39)	99 (37)	109 (43)	103 (39)	84 (29)	75 (24)	109 (43)
Mean maximum °F (°C)	67.0 (19.4)	72.4 (22.4)	75.9 (24.4)	82.8 (28.2)	85.5 (29.7)	89.1 (31.7)	87.3 (30.7)	88.7 (31.5)	89.7 (32.1)	87.8 (31.0)	75.8 (24.3)	66.5 (19.2)	94.7 (34.8)
Mean daily maximum °F (°C)	58.0 (14.4)	61.8 (16.6)	63.6 (17.6)	66.0 (18.9)	68.8 (20.4)	71.2 (21.8)	71.7 (22.1)	73.0 (22.8)	74.1 (23.4)	71.7 (22.1)	64.6 (18.1)	58.1 (14.5)	66.6 (19.2)
Daily mean °F (°C)	51.4 (10.8)	54.7 (12.6)	56.4 (13.6)	58.3 (14.6)	61.1 (16.2)	63.5 (17.5)	64.3 (17.9)	65.6 (18.7)	66.0 (18.9)	63.3 (17.4)	57.1 (13.9)	51.8 (11.0)	59.2 (15.1)
Mean daily minimum °F (°C)	44.7 (7.1)	47.7 (8.7)	49.1 (9.5)	50.5 (10.3)	53.5 (11.9)	55.7 (13.2)	56.9 (13.8)	58.1 (14.5)	57.8 (14.3)	55.1 (12.8)	49.8 (9.9)	45.4 (7.4)	51.9 (11.1)
Mean minimum °F (°C)	38.0 (3.3)	40.0 (4.4)	42.2 (5.7)	45.2 (7.3)	49.1 (9.5)	51.9 (11.1)	54.0 (12.2)	55.5 (13.1)	53.8 (12.1)	49.0 (9.4)	41.6 (5.3)	37.3 (2.9)	36.0 (2.2)
Record low °F (°C)	30 (−1)	29 (−2)	34 (1)	37 (3)	43 (6)	48 (9)	51 (11)	50 (10)	48 (9)	43 (6)	36 (2)	26 (−3)	26 (−3)
Average precipitation inches (mm)	4.59 (117)	4.65 (118)	3.52 (89)	1.32 (34)	0.73 (19)	0.12 (3.0)	0.00 (0.00)	0.07 (1.8)	0.23 (5.8)	1.29 (33)	3.07 (78)	4.44 (113)	24.09 (612)
Average precipitation days (≥ 0.01 in.)	10.2	10.5	10.7	5.9	3.4	1.0	0.1	0.4	1.2	3.5	8.1	10.4	69.1
Source: NOAA

Climate data for Livermore, California (1903–2013)
Month	Jan	Feb	Mar	Apr	May	Jun	Jul	Aug	Sep	Oct	Nov	Dec	Year
Record high °F (°C)	77 (25)	80 (27)	88 (31)	96 (36)	108 (42)	113 (45)	113 (45)	112 (44)	115 (46)	106 (41)	93 (34)	79 (26)	113 (45)
Mean maximum °F (°C)	66.9 (19.4)	71.4 (21.9)	77.9 (25.5)	85.8 (29.9)	94.3 (34.6)	102.0 (38.9)	104.3 (40.2)	102.8 (39.3)	101.2 (38.4)	92.6 (33.7)	79.0 (26.1)	67.8 (19.9)	106.3 (41.3)
Mean daily maximum °F (°C)	56.8 (13.8)	61.2 (16.2)	65.2 (18.4)	70.5 (21.4)	76.4 (24.7)	83.1 (28.4)	89.0 (31.7)	88.2 (31.2)	86.0 (30.0)	77.7 (25.4)	66.3 (19.1)	57.5 (14.2)	73.2 (22.9)
Mean daily minimum °F (°C)	36.7 (2.6)	39.4 (4.1)	41.3 (5.2)	43.6 (6.4)	47.6 (8.7)	51.7 (10.9)	54.2 (12.3)	54.0 (12.2)	52.5 (11.4)	47.7 (8.7)	41.1 (5.1)	37.0 (2.8)	45.6 (7.6)
Mean minimum °F (°C)	26.4 (−3.1)	29.5 (−1.4)	32.1 (0.1)	34.9 (1.6)	39.3 (4.1)	44.4 (6.9)	47.7 (8.7)	47.8 (8.8)	44.5 (6.9)	38.3 (3.5)	30.5 (−0.8)	26.7 (−2.9)	24.5 (−4.2)
Record low °F (°C)	18 (−8)	21 (−6)	22 (−6)	29 (−2)	32 (0)	38 (3)	36 (2)	36 (2)	35 (2)	29 (−2)	22 (−6)	18 (−8)	18 (−8)
Average precipitation inches (mm)	2.97 (75)	2.47 (63)	2.15 (55)	1.00 (25)	.44 (11)	.11 (2.8)	.02 (0.51)	.04 (1.0)	.22 (5.6)	.67 (17)	1.54 (39)	2.56 (65)	14.19 (359.91)
Average precipitation days (≥ .01 in)	10	9	9	6	3	1	0	0	1	3	7	9	58
Average snowy days	trace	0.0	0.0	0.0	0.0	0.0	0.0	0.0	0.0	0.0	0.0	0.1	0.1
Source: WRCC and pogodaiklimat.ru

=== Adjacent counties ===
The City and County of San Francisco, California, borders the county on the west, and has a small land border with the city of Alameda, California due to land filling.

Santa Clara County borders the county on the south.

San Joaquin County borders the county on the east.

Contra Costa County borders the county on the north.

Stanislaus County borders the county on the easternmost end of its southern boundary for 250 feet (76 m).

=== National protected area ===
- Don Edwards San Francisco Bay National Wildlife Refuge (part)

== Demographics ==
Historical population
Census	Pop.	Note	%±
1850	5,886		—
1860	8,927		51.7%
1870	24,237		171.5%
1880	62,976		159.8%
1890	93,864		49.0%
1900	130,197		38.7%
1910	246,131		89.0%
1920	344,177		39.8%
1930	474,883		38.0%
1940	513,011		8.0%
1950	740,315		44.3%
1960	908,209		22.7%
1970	1,073,184		18.2%
1980	1,105,379		3.0%
1990	1,279,182		15.7%
2000	1,443,741		12.9%
2010	1,510,271		4.6%
2020	1,682,353		11.4%
2025 (est.)	1,636,630	▼	−2.7%
U.S. Decennial Census; 1790–1960 1900–1990; 1990–2000 2010 2020

=== 2020 census ===
Alameda County, California – Racial and ethnic composition Note: the US Census treats Hispanic/Latino as an ethnic category. This table excludes Latinos from the racial categories and assigns them to a separate category. Hispanics/Latinos may be of any race.
Race / Ethnicity (NH = Non-Hispanic)	Pop 1980	Pop 1990	Pop 2000	Pop 2010	Pop 2020	% 1980	% 1990	% 2000	% 2010	% 2020
White alone (NH)	675,338	680,017	591,095	514,559	472,277	61.10%	53.16%	40.94%	34.07%	28.07%
Black or African American alone (NH)	200,950	222,873	211,124	184,126	159,499	18.18%	17.42%	14.62%	12.19%	9.48%
Native American or Alaska Native alone (NH)	7,446	6,763	5,306	4,189	4,131	0.67%	0.53%	0.37%	0.28%	0.25%
Asian alone (NH)	85,899	184,813	292,673	390,524	540,511	7.77%	14.45%	20.27%	25.86%	32.13%
Native Hawaiian or Pacific Islander alone (NH)	x	x	8,458	11,931	13,209	x	x	0.59%	0.79%	0.79%
Other race alone (NH)	5,784	2,911	4,676	4,191	10,440	0.52%	0.23%	0.32%	0.28%	0.62%
Mixed race or Multiracial (NH)	x	x	56,499	60,862	88,537	x	x	3.91%	4.03%	5.26%
Hispanic or Latino (any race)	129,962	181,805	273,910	339,889	393,749	11.76%	14.21%	18.97%	22.51%	23.40%
Total	1,105,379	1,279,182	1,443,741	1,510,271	1,682,353	100.00%	100.00%	100.00%	100.00%	100.00%

=== American Community Survey 2025 data ===
The United States Census Bureau estimated that in 2025, Alameda County’s population was 1,636,630. It was also estimated that the county's population was 25.92% Non-Hispanic White, 23.84% Hispanic or Latino, 8.83% Non-Hispanic Black, 35.42% Asian, 0.24% Native American, 0.81% Pacific Islander, and 4.94% Multiracial.

Total	Population	Percentage
Non-Hispanic White	424,217	25.92%
Hispanic or Latino	390,152	23.84%
Non-Hispanic Black	144,585	8.83%
Asian	579,642	35.42%
Native American	3,979	0.24%
Pacific Islander	13,286	0.81%
Non-Hispanic Multiracial	80,769	4.94%

As of the 2020 census, the county had a population of 1,682,353. The median age was 37.7 years, 20.4% of residents were under the age of 18, and 14.3% of residents were 65 years of age or older. For every 100 females there were 96.1 males, and for every 100 females age 18 and over there were 94.0 males age 18 and over.

The racial makeup of the county was 31.1% White, 9.8% Black or African American, 1.2% American Indian and Alaska Native, 32.4% Asian, 0.8% Native Hawaiian and Pacific Islander, 13.3% from some other race, and 11.3% from two or more races. Hispanic or Latino residents of any race comprised 23.4% of the population. The 2020 census shows Alameda as having one of the highest Asian percentages and being one of two counties in the continental US, along with neighboring Santa Clara County, California, to have an Asian plurality - consisting largely of Chinese, Indian and Filipino ancestry.

99.5% of residents lived in urban areas, while 0.5% lived in rural areas.

There were 591,636 households in the county, of which 33.0% had children under the age of 18 living with them and 26.5% had a female householder with no spouse or partner present. About 24.1% of all households were made up of individuals and 9.0% had someone living alone who was 65 years of age or older.

There were 621,958 housing units, of which 4.9% were vacant. Among occupied housing units, 51.8% were owner-occupied and 48.2% were renter-occupied. The homeowner vacancy rate was 0.8% and the rental vacancy rate was 4.8%.

=== 2014 ===
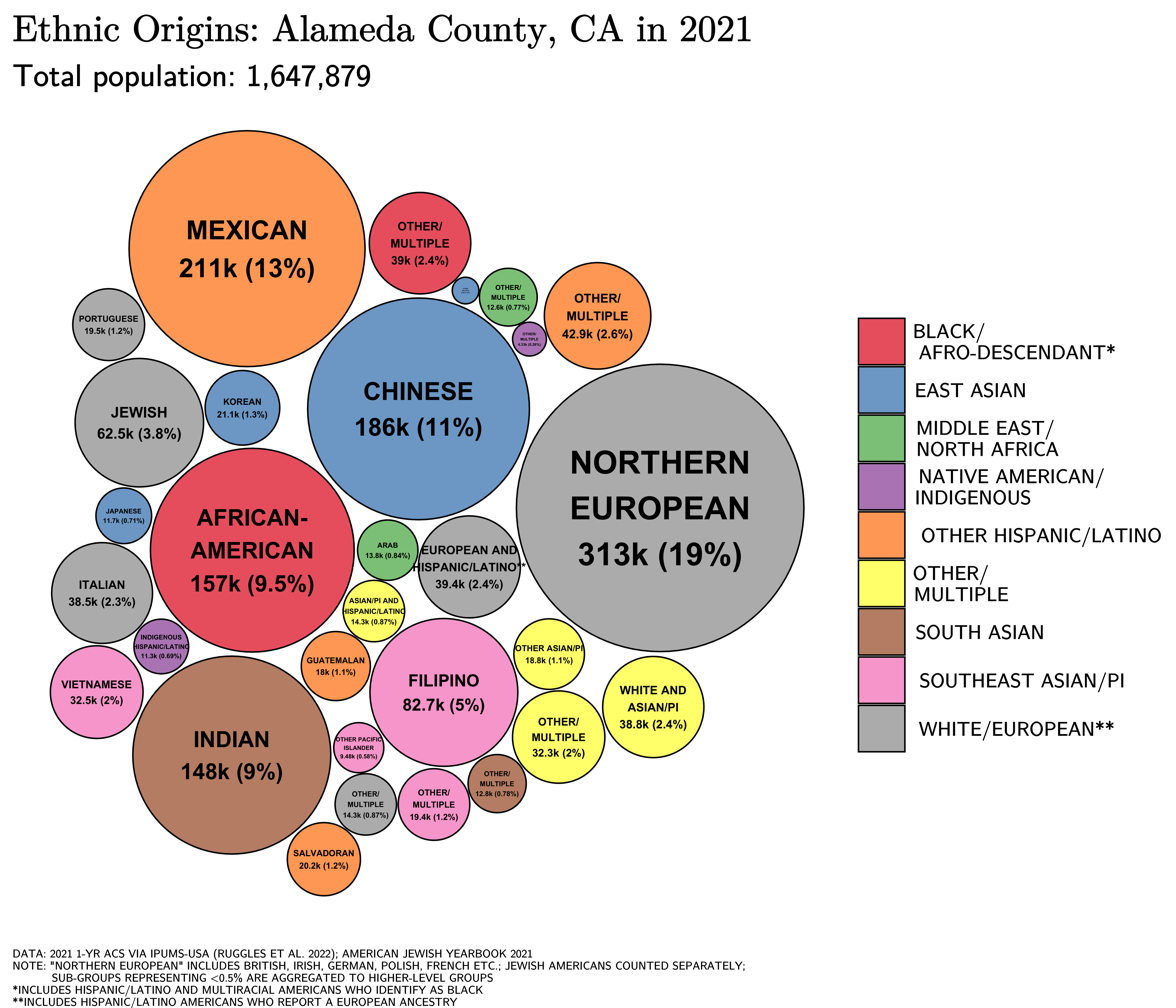
Ethnic origins in Alameda County

A 2014 analysis by The Atlantic found Alameda County to be the fourth most racially diverse county in the United States, in terms of closest to equal representation of each racial and ethnic group,—behind Aleutians West Census Area and Aleutians East Borough in Alaska, and Queens County in New York—as well as the most diverse county in California.

=== 2010 census ===
The 2010 United States census reported that Alameda County had a population of 1,510,271. The population density was 2,047.6 inhabitants per square mile (790.6/km^{2}). The racial makeup of Alameda County was 649,122 (43.0%) White, 190,451 (12.6%) African American, 9,799 (0.6%) Native American, 394,560 (26.1%) Asian (9.7% Chinese, 5.5% Filipino, 4.8% Indian, 2.0% Vietnamese, 1.2% Korean, 0.8% Japanese, 2.2% Other Asian), 12,802 (0.8%) Pacific Islander, 162,540 (10.8%) from other races, and 90,997 (6.0%) from two or more races. Hispanic or Latino of any race were 339,889 persons (22.5%): 16.4% Mexican, 0.8% Puerto Rican, 0.2% Cuban, 5.1% Other Hispanic.

Demographic profile	2010
Total Population	1,510,271 – 100.0%
One Race	1,419,274 – 94.0%
Not Hispanic or Latino	1,170,382 – 77.5%
White alone	514,559 – 34.1%
Black or African American alone	184,126 – 12.2%
American Indian and Alaska Native alone	4,189 – 0.3%
Asian alone	390,524 – 25.9%
Native Hawaiian and Other Pacific Islander alone	11,931 – 0.8%
Some other race alone	4,191 – 0.3%
Two or more races alone	60,862 – 4.0%
Hispanic or Latino (of any race)	339,889 – 22.5%

Population reported at 2010 United States census
The County	Total; Population	White	African; American	Native; American	Asian	Pacific; Islander	other races	two or more races	Hispanic or Latino (of any race)
Alameda County	1,510,271	649,122	190,451	9,799	394,560	12,802	162,540	90,997	339,889
Incorporated cities	Total; Population	White	African; American	Native; American	Asian	Pacific; Islander	other races	two or more races	Hispanic or Latino (of any race)
Alameda	73,812	37,460	4,759	426	23,058	381	2,463	5,265	8,092
Albany	18,539	10,128	645	88	5,790	37	607	1,244	1,891
Berkeley	112,580	66,996	11,241	479	21,690	186	4,994	6,994	12,209
Dublin	46,036	23,634	4,347	246	12,321	287	2,458	2,743	6,663
Emeryville	10,080	4,490	1,764	44	2,775	16	348	643	927
Fremont	214,089	70,320	7,103	976	108,332	1,169	13,605	12,584	31,698
Hayward	144,186	49,309	17,099	1,396	31,666	4,535	30,004	10,177	58,730
Livermore	80,968	60,418	1,702	476	6,802	277	6,960	4,333	16,920
Newark	42,573	17,566	2,002	279	11,571	621	7,735	2,799	14,994
Oakland	390,724	134,925	109,471	3,040	65,811	2,222	53,378	21,877	99,068
Piedmont	10,667	7,917	144	6	1,939	13	94	554	421
Pleasanton	70,285	47,058	1,190	226	16,322	134	2,002	3,353	7,264
San Leandro	84,950	31,946	10,437	669	25,206	642	11,295	4,755	23,237
Union City	69,516	16,640	4,402	329	35,363	892	7,253	4,637	15,895
Census-designated places	Total; Population	White	African; American	Native; American	Asian	Pacific; Islander	other races	two or more races	Hispanic or Latino (of any race)
Ashland	21,925	6,705	4,269	232	4,031	260	5,124	1,304	9,394
Castro Valley	61,388	35,602	4,260	329	13,140	417	3,757	3,883	10,689
Cherryland	14,728	6,035	1,698	200	1,404	310	4,016	1,065	7,955
Fairview	10,003	4,499	2,105	76	1,525	129	913	756	2,171
San Lorenzo	23,452	11,115	1,136	228	5,054	182	4,207	1,530	8,843
Sunol	913	780	1	6	48	7	19	52	91
Other unincorporated areas	Total; Population	White	African; American	Native; American	Asian	Pacific; Islander	other races	two or more races	Hispanic or Latino (of any race)
All others not CDPs (combined)	8,857	5,579	676	48	712	85	1,308	449	2,737

=== 2000 census ===
As of the census of 2000, there were 1,443,741 people, 523,366 households, out of which 32.6% had children under the age of 18 living within them, 47.0% married couples living together, 13.0% had a female householder with no husband present, and 35.2% were non-families. 26.0% of all households were made up of individuals, and 7.3% had someone living alone who was 65 years of age or older. The average household size was 2.71 and the average family size was 3.31.

In the county, the population was spread out, with 24.6% under the age of 18, 9.6% from 18 to 24, 33.9% from 25 to 44, 21.7% from 45 to 64, and 10.2% who were 65 years of age or older. The median age was 34 years. For every 100 females there were 96.60 males. For every 100 females age 18 and over, there were 94.00 males.

The median income for a household in the county was $55,946, and the median income for a family was $65,857 (these figures had risen to $66,430 and $81,341 respectively as of a 2007 estimate). Males had a median income of $47,425 versus $36,921 for females. The per capita income for the county was $26,680. About 7.7% of families and 11.0% of the population were below the poverty line, including 13.5% of those under age 18 and 8.1% of those age 65 or over.

In 2000, the largest denominational group was the Catholics (with 306,437 adherents). The largest religious bodies were the Catholic Church (with 306,437 members) and Judaism (with 32,500 members).

=== 2024 United States Census Bureau American Community Survey estimates ===
Racial Makeup of Alameda County (2024): 1. White alone (28.0%); 2. Black alone (9.39%); 3. Native American alone (1.19%); 4. Asian Alone (34.1%); 5. Pacific Islander Alone (0.76%); 6. Other race alone (14.1%); 7. Two or more races (12.4%)	Racial Makeup of Alameda County excluding Hispanics from racial categories (2024); NH=Non-Hispanic: 1. White alone (26.1%); 2. Black alone (9.13%); 3. Native American alone (0.50%); 4. Asian Alone (33.9%); 5. Pacific Islander Alone (0.71%); 6. Other race alone (0.64%); 7. Two or more races (5.85%); 8. Hispanic Any Race (23.6%)	Racial Makeup of Hispanics in Alameda County (2024): 1. White alone (8.14%); 2. Black alone (1.13%); 3. Native American alone (4.41%); 4. Asian alone (0.89%); 5. Pacific Islander alone (0.20%); 6. Other race alone (57.3%); 7. Two or more races (27.9%)

According to 2024 US Census Bureau estimates, Alameda County's population was 28.0% White (26.1% Non-Hispanic White and 1.9% Hispanic White), 9.4% Black or African American, 34.1% Asian, 14.1% Some Other Race, 1.2% Native American and Alaskan Native, 0.8% Pacific Islander and 14.1% from two or more races.

Asian Americans are the largest racial/ethnic group at 33.9% (excluding Asian Hispanics).

The White population is the second largest racial category in Alameda County and includes the 8.1% of Hispanics who self-identify as White. The remainder of Hispanics self-identify as Other Race (57.3%), Multiracial (27.9%), American Indian and Alaskan Native (4.4%), Black (1.1%), Asian (0.9%), and Hawaiian and Pacific Islander (0.2%).

The Black population continues to decline and at 9.1% (excluding Black Hispanics) is below the national average of 11.7% in 2024. The Black population peaked in the 1980 Census at 18.4%. Alameda county has the 2nd highest percentage of Black residents in California after Solano County at 13.4%.

White Non-Hispanic Americans are the largest minority group at 23.6% of the population.

By ethnicity, 23.6% of the total population is Hispanic-Latino (of any race) and 77.7% is Non-Hispanic (of any race). If treated as a category separate from race, Hispanics are the third largest minority group in Alameda County.

=== 2018 American Community Survey ===
If Hispanics are treated as a separate category from race, Alameda County's population was 30.4% White, 30.9% Asian, 22.3% Hispanic-Latino, 10.3% Black or African American, 0.5% Some Other Race, 0.3% Native American and Alaskan Native, 0.8% Pacific Islander and 4.4% from two or more races.

The largest ancestry group of Hispanics in Alameda County (2018) are of Mexican descent (72.9% of Hispanics) followed by Salvadoran descent (5.5% of Hispanics), Guatemalan descent (3.9%), Puerto Rican descent (3.4%), Spaniard descent (2.0%), Nicaraguan descent (1.7%), Peruvian descent (1.4%), Cuban descent (1.2%), Colombian descent (1.1%), and those of other Hispanic ethnicity or of mixed Hispanic ethnicity (6.9%).

== Crime ==
The following table includes the number of incidents reported and the rate per 1,000 persons for each type of offense.

Population and crime rates in 2009
Population	1,494,876	
Violent crime	11,189	7.48
Homicide	138	0.09
Forcible rape	553	0.37
Robbery	5,215	3.49
Aggravated assault	5,283	3.53
Property crime	33,395	22.34
Burglary	11,478	7.68
Larceny-theft (Note: Only larceny-theft cases involving property over $400 in value are reported as property crimes.)	32,102	21.47
Motor vehicle theft	12,768	8.54
Arson	457	0.31

=== Cities by population and crime rates ===
Cities by population and crime rates in 2012
City	Population	Violent crimes	Violent crime rate per 1,000 persons	Property crimes	Property crime rate per 1,000 persons
Alameda	75,467	160	2.12	1,892	25.07
Albany	18,960	35	1.85	537	28.32
Berkeley	114,961	487	4.24	5,696	49.55
Dublin	49,890	84	1.79	731	15.55
Emeryville	10,309	175	16.98	1,735	168.30
Fremont	218,927	306	1.40	4,259	19.45
Hayward	147,424	613	4.16	4,792	32.50
Livermore	82,800	301	3.64	1,805	21.80
Newark	43,539	169	3.88	1,349	30.98
Oakland	399,487	7,963	19.93	26,342	65.94
Piedmont	10,909	13	1.19	333	30.53
Pleasanton	71,875	49	0.68	1,279	17.79
San Leandro	86,869	437	5.03	3,585	41.27
Union City	71,089	235	3.31	1,808	25.43

== Education ==
The Alameda County Office of Education oversees seventeen K–12 school districts and one K–8 district in Alameda County. In all, there are approximately 10,000 teachers serving 225,000 students. The ACOE also services three community college districts with a total enrollment of approximately 55,000 students.

The Alameda County Library operates libraries in the cities of Albany, Dublin, Fremont, Newark and Union City and the unincorporated communities of Castro Valley and San Lorenzo. The cities of Alameda, Berkeley, Hayward, Livermore, Oakland, San Leandro, and Pleasanton have their own library systems.

=== Colleges and universities ===
Alameda County is home to the University of California, Berkeley, the flagship campus of the University of California system, and one of the largest and most prestigious research universities in the world.

Other colleges and universities located within Alameda county include:

- Berkeley City College
- California State University, East Bay, one of the campuses of the California State University system
- Chabot College, a two-year community college, part of the Chabot-Las Positas Community College District
- College of Alameda, a two-year community college, part of the Peralta Community College District of northern Alameda County
- Graduate Theological Union, a consortium of several Bay Area seminaries, affiliated with the University of California, Berkeley.
- Laney College, a two-year community college, part of the Peralta Community College system
- Las Positas College
- Merritt College, a two-year community college, part of the Peralta Community College system
- Mills College at Northeastern University, a private 4 year women's college and coeducational graduate school
- Ohlone College, part of the Ohlone Community College District
- Samuel Merritt University

Other local colleges and universities which have now closed include:

- SAE Expression College, a for-profit school specializing in creative media
- Holy Names University

=== Public schools ===
School districts

K–12 unified school districts:

- Alameda Unified School District
- Albany Unified School District
- Berkeley Unified School District
- Castro Valley Unified School District
- Dublin Unified School District
- Emery Unified School District
- Fremont Unified School District
- Hayward Unified School District
- Livermore Valley Joint Unified School District
- New Haven Unified School District
- Newark Unified School District
- Oakland Unified School District
- Piedmont Unified School District
- Pleasanton Unified School District
- San Leandro Unified School District
- San Lorenzo Unified School District
- Sunol Glen Unified School District

Others:

- Lammersville Joint Unified School District (high)
- Mountain House Elementary School District (elementary)

State-operated schools

- California School for the Blind
- California School for the Deaf, Riverside

== Arts ==
The Alameda County Arts Commission, a division of the county administration, under the California Arts Council, was created in 1965. Its fifteen appointed members act in an advisory capacity to the board of supervisors, in promoting the arts. The Oakland Museum of California has a substantial collection of California art works and historical artifacts.

== Sports ==
The following sports teams play in Alameda County:

Club	Sport	Founded	League	Venue
California Golden Bears	NCAA	1868	NCAA: ACC	California Memorial Stadium (Football), Haas Pavilion (Basketball), Evans Diamond (Baseball)
East Bay FC Stompers	Soccer	2012 (in San Francisco from 2012 to 2015)	National Premier Soccer League: Golden Gate Conference	Pioneer Stadium
Oakland Roots	Soccer	2018	USL Championship	Oakland Coliseum

== Events ==
The annual county fair is held at the Alameda County Fairgrounds in Pleasanton. The fair runs for four weekends from June to July. Attractions include horse racing, carnival rides, 4-H exhibits, and live bands. Oakland's Chinatown has also been hosting the ongoing annual Lunar New Years celebration event with plentiful of live performances, music, and fun interactive stands for children. Fremont Festival of the Arts located in Fremont is an ongoing event featuring handmade arts and crafts, food trucks, and array of live music and entertainment. The annual Livermore parade takes place in Livermore with live performances, local organized groups, and followed up with the annual Livermore Rodeo showcasing live performances from cowboys riding bulls and local merchandise stands.The Alameda Point Antiques Faire is a monthly antique fair held on the grounds of the former Alameda Naval Station and the largest of its kind in Northern California.

== Parks and recreation ==
There are more than 350 parks located within the county. The East Bay Regional Park District operates within Alameda and neighboring Contra Costa County, with numerous parks within the county, including Tilden Regional Park, Redwood Regional Park, Anthony Chabot Regional Park, Coyote Hills Regional Park, Ardenwood Historic Farm, Pleasanton Ridge Regional Park and Vargas Plateau Regional Park. Eastshore State Park is located partially along the bay shore of northern Alameda County. The San Francisco Bay Trail, a project of the Association of Bay Area Governments, will run along the bay shore of the county. The Hayward Area Recreation and Park District is the largest special park district in California.

== Transportation ==
=== Major highways ===
- I-80
- I-205
- I-238 / SR 238
- I-580
- I-680
- I-880
- I-980
- SR 13
- SR 24
- SR 61
  - SR 112 (unsigned)
  - SR 260 (unsigned)
- SR 77
- SR 84
- SR 92
- SR 123 – former US 40
- SR 185
- SR 262

=== Mass transit ===
==== Rail ====
- Altamont Corridor Express (ACE) – commuter rail using existing railroad tracks; primarily brings commuters from San Joaquin County to Santa Clara County
- Amtrak
  - California Zephyr – intercity train route running between Emeryville and Chicago.
  - Capitol Corridor – commuter rail using existing railroad tracks, extending from San Jose to Sacramento, running through western Alameda County
  - Coast Starlight – intercity train route running between Los Angeles and Seattle via Oakland and Emeryville
  - Gold Runner – Amtrak route between Oakland and Bakersfield through Fresno and the Central Valley
- Bay Area Rapid Transit (BART) – rapid transit commuter rail centered on northwest Oakland, primarily serving commuters to downtown San Francisco and downtown Oakland
- Valley Link – planned commuter rail running between the Tri-Valley and San Joaquin County (expected to commence in 2028)

==== Bus ====
- AC Transit – local bus system in western Alameda County and west Contra Costa County, with additional service across the three bridges from Alameda County to downtown San Francisco, San Mateo, and Palo Alto
- WHEELS – bus system in the cities of southeastern Alameda County
- Union City Transit – local city bus service within Union City in addition to AC Transit
- Emery Go-Round – free bus service in Emeryville
- Dumbarton Express – additional service across the Dumbarton Bridge between Fremont and Palo Alto
- Santa Clara Valley Transportation Authority (VTA) – commuter service between southern Alameda county and job centers in the Silicon Valley

==== Ferry ====
- Alameda / Oakland Ferry and Harbor Bay Ferry – connect Oakland, Alameda, and Bay Farm Island with downtown San Francisco

=== Airports ===
The main airport is the Oakland San Francisco Bay Airport, with two general aviation airports, the Hayward Executive Airport and Livermore Municipal Airport.

== Services ==
Alameda Health System operates the public health system in Alameda County. It operates five hospitals (Alameda Hospital, Fairmont Hospital, Highland Hospital, John George Psychiatric Hospital, and San Leandro Hospital), and four primary care medical clinics (called ambulatory wellness centers) within the county.

The Alameda County Community Food Bank nonprofit provides food bank resources to residents. The Family Emergency Shelter Coalition coordinates services for homeless families.

== Landmarks ==
Alameda County has eight National Historic Landmarks: The Abbey, Joaquin Miller House, First Church of Christ, Scientist, USS Hornet (CVS-12) (aircraft carrier), Lake Merritt Wild Duck Refuge, Lightship WAL-605, Relief, Paramount Theatre, Potomac (Presidential yacht), and Room 307, Gilman Hall, University of California. The county has a large number of National Historic Places, as well as a number of California Historical Landmarks.

== Sister counties ==
Alameda has two sister county: Taoyuan County, Taiwan (now Taoyuan City) and Zhongshan in China.

== Communities ==
Cities and census designated places of Alameda County

=== Cities ===
No. on Map	City	Year incorporated	Population, 2020
1	Alameda	1854	78,280
2	Albany	1908	20,271
3	Berkeley	1878	124,321
4	Dublin	1982	72,589
5	Emeryville	1896	12,905
6	Fremont	1956	230,504
7	Hayward	1876	162,954
8	Livermore	1876	87,955
9	Newark	1955	47,529
10	Oakland (county seat)	1852	440,646
11	Piedmont	1907	11,270
12	Pleasanton	1894	79,871
13	San Leandro	1872	91,008
14	Union City	1959	70,143

=== Census-designated places ===
20. Ashland
21. Castro Valley
22. Cherryland
23. Fairview
24. San Lorenzo
25. Sunol

=== Unincorporated communities ===
- Altamont
- Brightside
- Carpenter
- Dougherty
- Dresser
- East Pleasanton
- Hayward Acres
- Kilkare Woods
- Komandorski Village
- Mendenhall Springs
- Midway
- Mountain House
- Mowry Landing
- San Ramon Village
- Scotts Corner
- Verona

=== Former townships ===
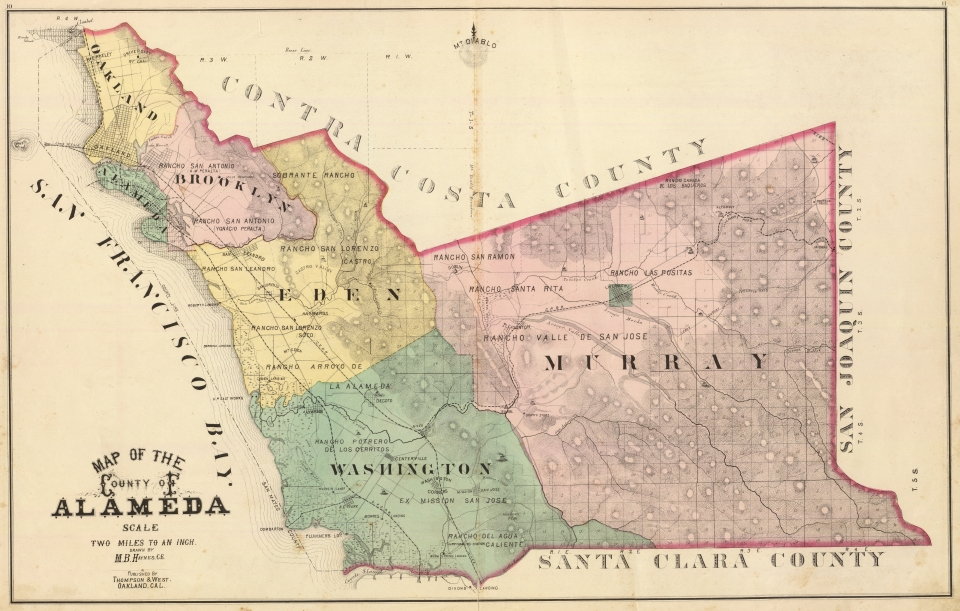
Map of Alameda County, 1878 (Six Townships)

- Oakland Township – the northern portion subsequently became the cities of Berkeley and Albany.
- Alameda Township – now essentially coterminous with the City of Alameda.
- Brooklyn Township – mostly contained within Oakland and Piedmont.
- Eden Township – partly incorporated into San Leandro and Hayward, the rest contains the communities of Castro Valley, San Lorenzo, and other unincorporated areas.
- Washington Township – contains Union City, Newark, Fremont, and small unincorporated areas nearby.
- Murray Township — Contains cities of Dublin, Pleasanton, and Livermore, and substantial unincorporated areas including Sunol.

=== Population ranking ===
The population ranking of the following table is based on the 2020 census of Alameda County.

† county seat

Rank	City/Town/etc.	Municipal type	Population (2020 Census)
1	† Oakland	City	440,646
2	Fremont	City	230,504
3	Hayward	City	162,954
4	Berkeley	City	124,321
5	San Leandro	City	91,008
6	Livermore	City	87,955
7	Pleasanton	City	79,871
8	Alameda	City	78,280
9	Dublin	City	72,589
10	Union City	City	70,143
11	Castro Valley	CDP	66,441
12	Newark	City	47,529
13	San Lorenzo	CDP	29,581
14	Ashland	CDP	23,823
15	Albany	City	20,271
16	Cherryland	CDP	15,808
17	Emeryville	City	12,905
18	Fairview	CDP	11,341
19	Piedmont	City	11,270
20	Sunol	CDP	922

== See also ==
- USS Alameda County (LST-32), the only US Naval vessel named after the county
- National Register of Historic Places listings in Alameda County, California
- Solar power in Alameda County
- List of counties in California
