= Sulphur Creek Nature Center =

Wildlife rehabilitation center in California

The Sulphur Creek Nature Center is a nature center and wildlife rehabilitation center located in Hayward, California, United States. They are managed by the Hayward Area Recreation and Park District. The center has facilities for taking in and providing medical and rehabilitation services for wild animals, including mammals and birds, and a small display of San Francisco Bay Area native reptiles and amphibians. The center is an educational site for local elementary schools. The site is adjacent to Sulphur Creek, a tributary of San Lorenzo Creek. They treat up to 900 wild animals a year and in 2012 installed a webcam for observing a barn owl family.
