= Henry Walker Crabb =

American winemaker (1828–1899)

Henry Walker Crabb, also known as H. W. Crabb, Hiram Walker Crabb or Hamilton Walker Crabb, (January 1, 1828 – 1899) was an American wine cultivator, considered one of the pioneers of the development of the Napa Valley as a wine region. In the 1880s, his vine collection was one of the largest in the world.

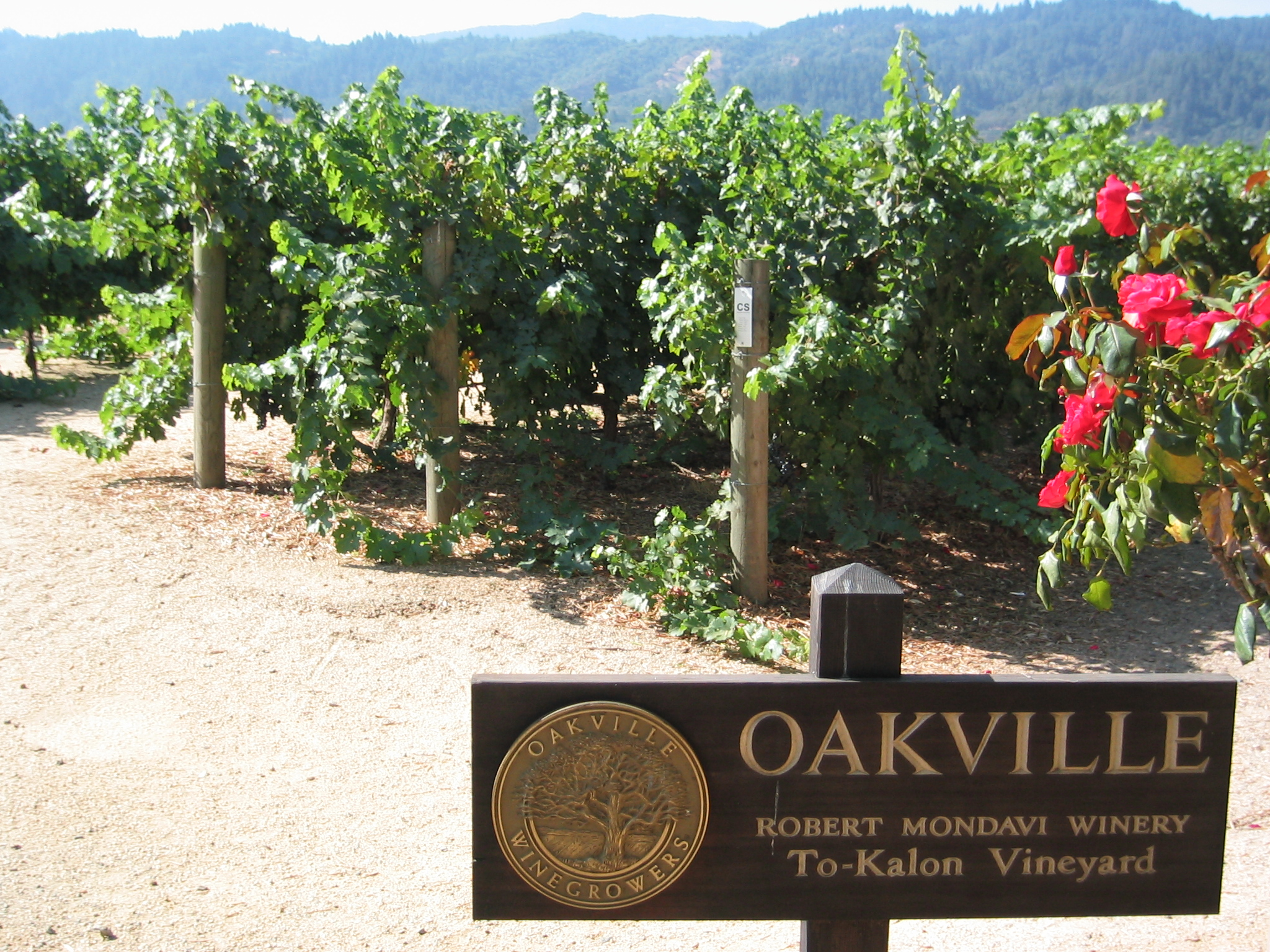
To-Kalon Vineyard

== Early years ==
He was born in Jefferson County, Ohio on January 1, 1828, the eldest son of Henry and Esther Walker Crabb. In 1840, the family relocated to Adams County, Ohio, until 1853, when he settled in San Lorenzo, California.

== Career ==
Referring to the meaning of To-Kalon in Greek, Crabb stated, "I try to make it mean the boss vineyard".

In 1865, he moved to Napa. Three years later, he bought land near Oakville, close to the Napa River; and sold some of that land in the same year to build the railroad depot. His early establishment, Hermosa Vineyard, produced table grapes and raisins. In 1872, Crabb established a vineyard and winery named "To-Kalon", (Greek: "the call of beauty") and by 1877 had planted 130 acres (0.53 km^{2}) and was producing 50,000 US gallons of wine per year. By the later half of the 1880s, the vineyard covered 1,100 acres. Crabb's collection of vines was one of the largest in the world at that time, including more than 400 varieties; in the following decade, he was referred to as the "Wine King of the Pacific Slope" by the Chicago Herald.

Crabb experimented with over 400 grape varieties to find the types best suited for the area, including Zinfandel, Burgundy, Petite Syrah, Beclan, Cauche Noir, Cabernet, Riesling, Pinot Chardonay, Muscatelle and Sauterne. The Refosco or Mondeuse was occasionally referred to as Crabb's Black Burgundy prior to Prohibition in California. His Zinfandels received awards at the San Francisco Midwinter Fair (1894) and at the Alaska-Yukon Exposition (gold medal, 1909). Along with another one of California's early winegrower, John Lewelling, Crabb developed a method for shipping grapes on ice. With agencies in New Orleans, the Midwest and the East, Crabb shipped his wine in cases and in bulk.

After Crabb's death in 1899 of apoplexy, the estate was owned by the E. W. Churchill family until 1943, when it was bought by Martin Stelling. Most of Crabb's To-Kalon acreage is now owned by the Robert Mondavi winery. The remaining To-Kalon acreage is owned by the Opus One Winery, Beckstoffer Vineyards, Detert Family Vineyards, MacDonald and the University of California.
