= Hayward Area Recreation and Park District =

Park management agency in Hayward, California

Coordinates: 37.671065°N 122.076611°W

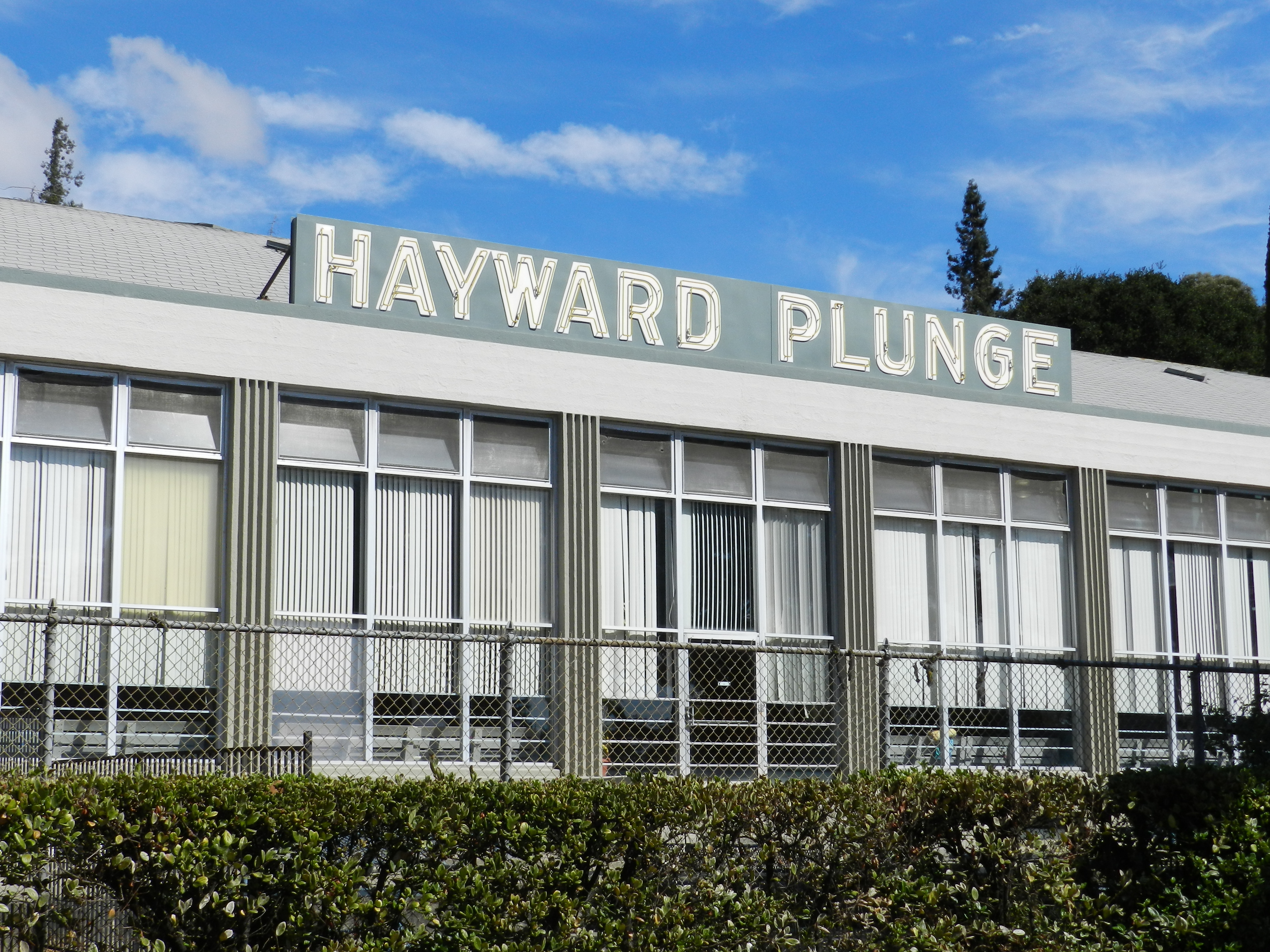
Hayward Plunge at Memorial Park

The Hayward Area Recreation and Park District (H.A.R.D.) is the park management agency for most of the parks in the city of Hayward, California. It was created in 1944 and is an independent special district under California law. H.A.R.D. is the largest recreation district in California. It also manages parks in the bordering unincorporated communities of Castro Valley, San Lorenzo, Fairview, Ashland and Cherryland. It manages the park grounds for numerous schools in the region. Events and classes are scheduled and listed in a quarterly brochure. The parks' 2021 budget is $24,306,495.

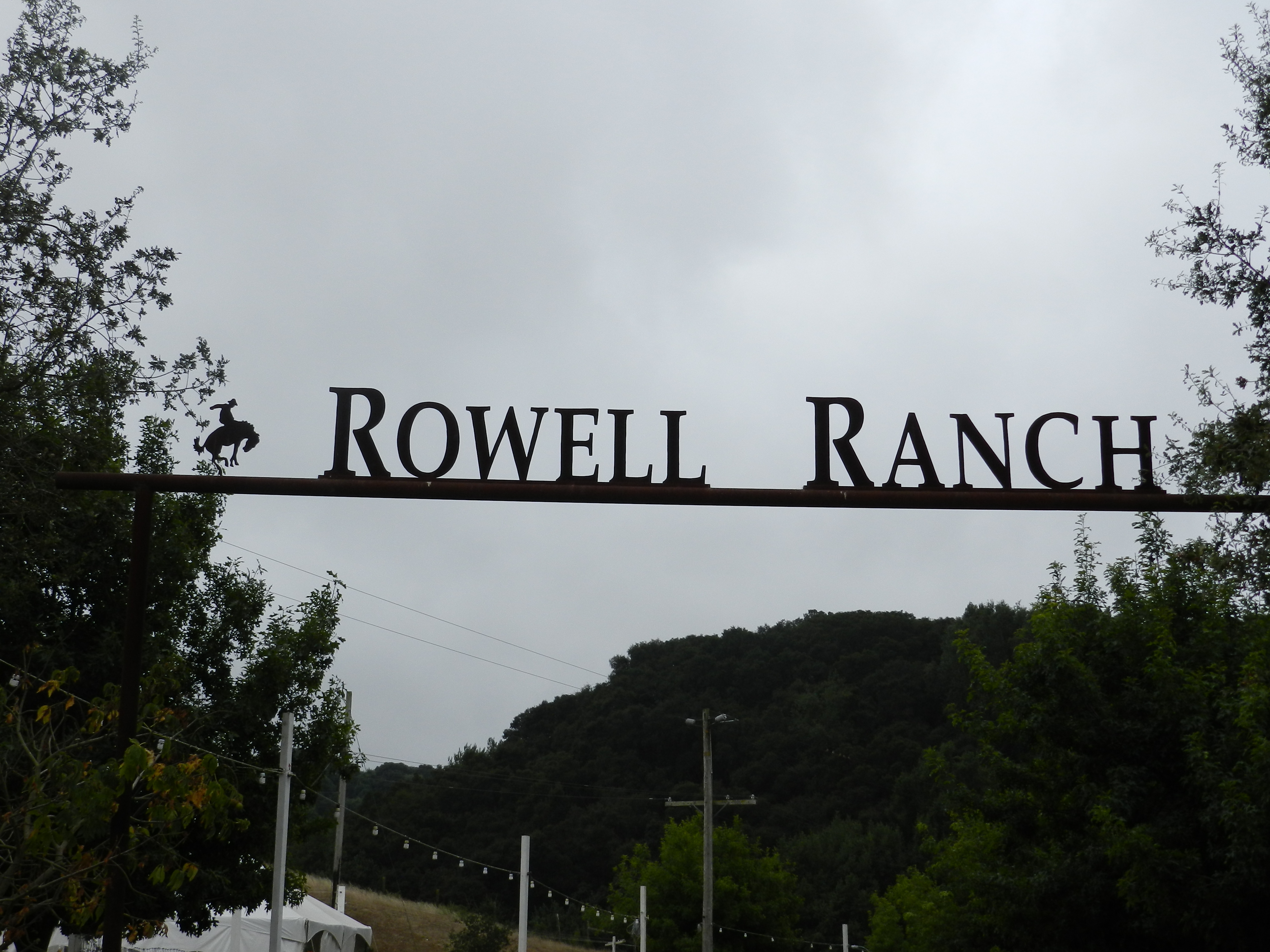
gate at Rowell Rodeo Park

== List of parks ==
This is a list of parks managed by H.A.R.D., by city or unincorporated community, with indications of significant park features beyond picnic and open areas, parking, ball courts, restrooms, etc.

=== Hayward ===
73 parks are operated in Hayward:

- Alden E. Oliver Sports Park of Hayward
- Bechtel Mini Park
- Bidwell Park
- Birchfield Park
- Brenkwitz High School
- Matt Jimenez Community Center
  - youth center, gymnasium
- Bret Harte School
- Burbank School
  - recreation center
- Cannery Park
- Canyon View Park
- Centennial Park
- Cherryland Park
- Children's Park at Alex Giualini Plaza
- Christian Penke Park
- College Heights Park
- Colonial Acres School
- Douglas Morrisson Theatre
  - theatrical venue
- East Avenue Park
  - amphitheatre
- East Avenue School
- Eden Greenway
- El Rancho Verde School
- Eldridge Park
- Fairmont Linear Park
- Fairview Park
  - recreation center
- Fairway Greens Park
- Gansberger Park
- Gordon E. Oliver Eden Shores Park
- Greenbelt Trails (see Memorial Park)
  - hiking/riding trails
- Greenwood Park
- Harder School
- Haymont Mini Park
- Hayward Area Senior Center
  - community center
- Hayward High School
  - swim center
- Hayward Shoreline Interpretive Center
- Jalquin Vista Park
- Japanese Gardens
  - wedding site
- Kennedy Park
  - group picnic area, petting zoo, children's train, merry-go-round
- La Placita Mini Park
- Lakeridge Park
- Longwood Park
- Martin Luther King Field
- Memorial Park
  - group picnic area, hiking/riding trails (access point for Greenbelt Trails), swim center/indoor pool (Hayward Plunge)
- Mt. Eden High School
- Mt. Eden Park
  - group picnic area, softball field, Mt. Eden Mansion
- Nuestro Parquecito
- Old Highlands Park
  - hiking/riding trails
- Palma Ceia Park
  - recreation center building
- Park School
- Pexioto School
- PhotoCentral
  - darkrooms, gallery
- Rancho Arroyo Park
- Ruus Park
- Schafer Park
- Shepherd School
- Silver Star Veterans Park
  - hiking/riding trails
  - group picnic area, hiking/riding trails, pro shop, restaurant, driving range
- Sorensdale Park
  - disabled citizen center
- Southgate Park
  - group picnic area, hiking/riding trails, community center building
- Spring Grove Park
- Stonybrook Park
- Stratford Village Park
  - skate area
- Sunset Adult School
  - swim center
- Tennyson High School
- Tennyson Park
  - group picnic area, skate area
- Twin Bridges Park
- Tyrrell School
- Valle Vista Park
- Weekes Park
  - group picnic area, community center building, art studio
- Weekes Community Center

=== Ashland ===
Three parks are operated in Ashland:

- Ashland Park and Community Center
  - community center building
- Jack Holland Sr. Park
  - skate park
- Edendale Park
  - dog park

=== Castro Valley ===
Twenty parks are operated in Castro Valley:

- Adobe Center
- Bay Trees Park
- Canyon Middle School
- Carlos Bee Park
- Castro Valley High School
  - swim center
- Castro Valley Park and Community Center
  - community center, Chanticleer's Little Theatre
- Deerview Park
- Earl Warren Park
- Greenridge Park
- Independent School
- Kenneth C. Aitken Senior and Community Center
  - community center, senior center
- Laurel Park
- Marshall School
- Palomares Hills Park
- Parsons Park
- Proctor School
- Redwood School
- Rowell Ranch
  - rodeo park. The park is a current, and historic site, for rodeos, and was frequented by Western film stars in the past.
- Strobridge School
- Vannoy School

=== Cherryland ===
Four parks are operated in Cherryland:

- Cherryland Park
  - Playground and picnic grounds
- Old Creek Dog Park of Cherryland
- Meek Estate Park
  - Historic Building, cherry orchard
- Cherryland Community Center

=== Fairview ===
Four parks are operated in Fairview:

- San Felipe Park
  - community building
- Sulphur Creek Nature Center
  - nature center, including animal rehabilitation facilities
- Lakeridge Park
- East Avenue Park

=== San Lorenzo ===
Ten parks are operated in San Lorenzo:

- Arroyo High School
- Bohannon School
- Del Rey Park
- Fairmont Terrace Park
- Hesperian Park
- McConaghy Park
  - historical building (McConaghy House, with museum managed by the Hayward Area Historical Society)
- Mervin Morris Park
  - skate area
- San Lorenzo High School
- San Lorenzo Park and Recreation Center
  - hiking/riding trails, community center building, lagoon

== Other sites ==
H.A.R.D. has partnered with the Hayward Area Historical Society to restore the Meek Mansion, and to manage the open space portions of the site. The Hayward Area Shoreline Planning Agency, created in 1970, is a joint project of H.A.R.D., the East Bay Regional Parks District and the city of Hayward to protect shoreline resources from San Lorenzo Creek to New Alameda Creek on the border of Hayward and Fremont.

== Hayward parks not managed by HARD ==
Julio Bras Portuguese Centennial Park and Newman Park in downtown Hayward are not managed by HARD.

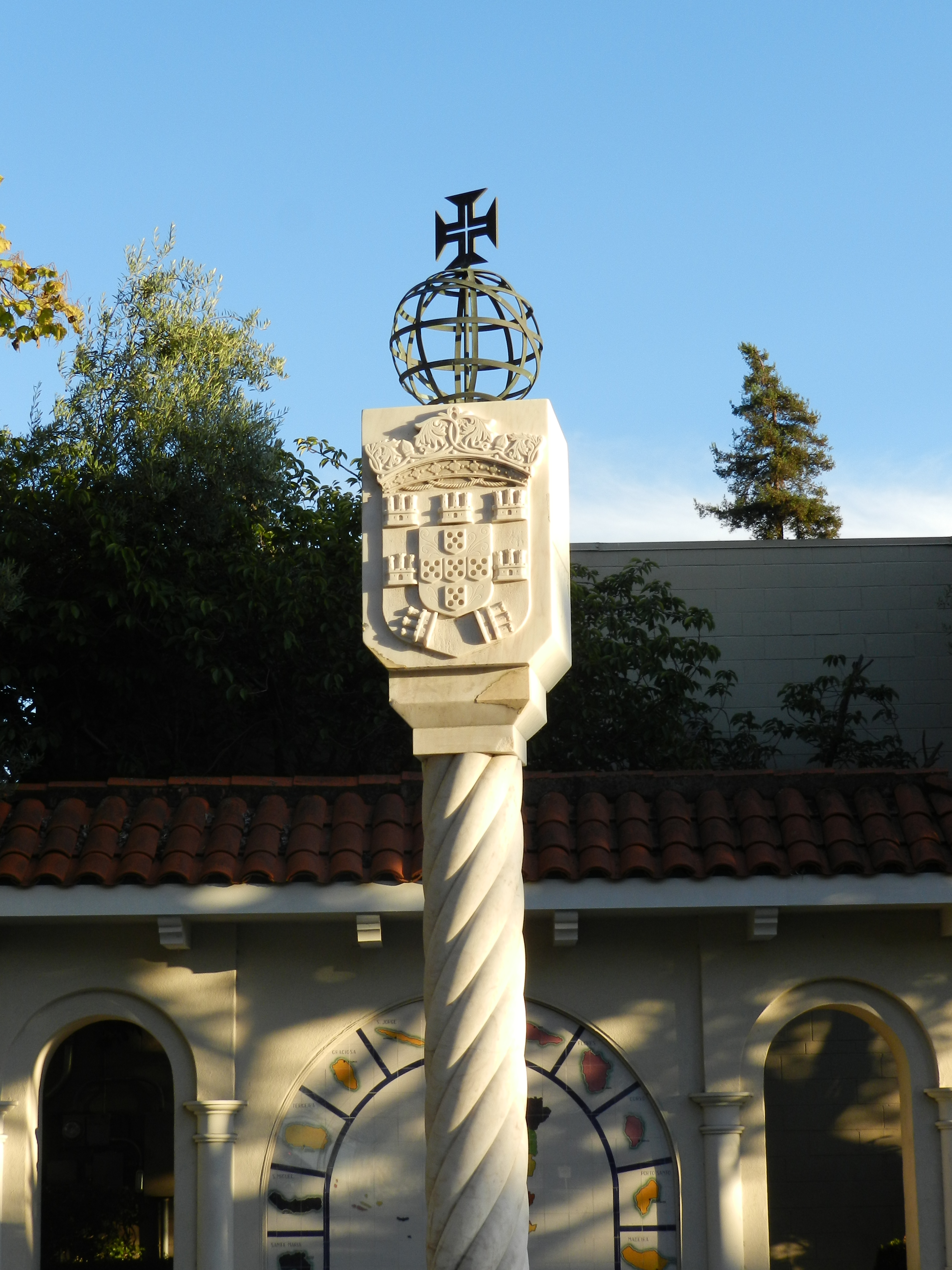
Column at Julio Bras Park, not managed by HARD
