= Hayward Area Historical Society =

Coordinates: 37.676857°N 122.082605°W

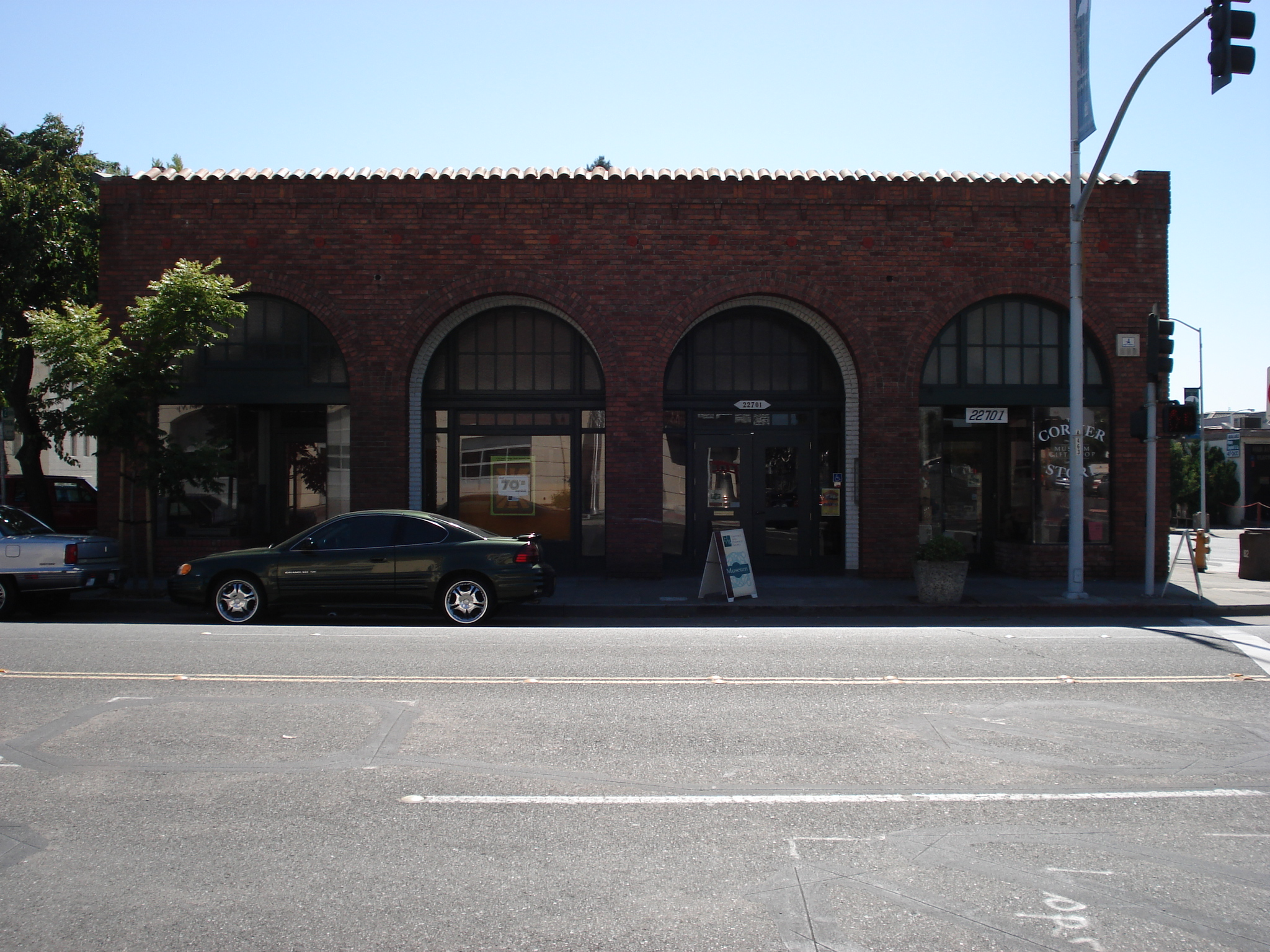
Former HAHS museum (2006)

Hayward Area Historical Society (HAHS) is a nonprofit organization dedicated to documenting the history of the city of Hayward, California and adjacent communities. These areas include San Lorenzo, Ashland, Cherryland, Castro Valley, Fairview, the former communities of Russell City, Mount Eden, Schafer Park, and other parts of unincorporated Alameda County. The society was founded in 1956. Their museum in Downtown Hayward closed in 2012. Their new facility opened nearby in 2014.

== Activities ==
HAHS operates the Meek Mansion and McConaghy House in partnership with the Hayward Area Recreation and Park District, and the San Lorenzo Pioneer Cemetery with Alameda County. The society sponsors an annual History Awards, honoring local historians and preservationists. The 2012 awards were the 13th held. They have presented talks on local history in conjunction with California State University, East Bay. They provide records for research into genealogies. They have worked with photographer Bill Owens on the Hayward Documentary Project. The Society is the future repository for the papers of local US Congressperson Pete Stark, in office for 40 years.
