= Eden Township, Alameda County, California =

Former civil township

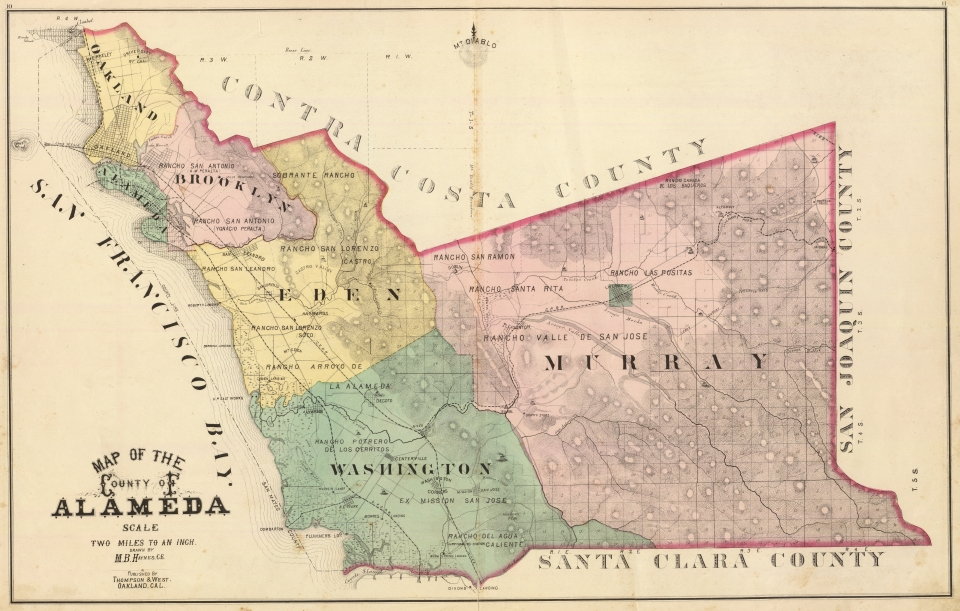
Eden Township (in yellow, center left) within Alameda County as of 1878

Eden Township is a historical township of Alameda County, California, United States in the San Francisco Bay Area region, which includes the present-day cities of Hayward and San Leandro, as well as the unincorporated census-designated areas of Ashland, Castro Valley, Cherryland, Fairview, and San Lorenzo. It was created from a group of Mexican land grants that were added to Alameda County when the county was established in 1853. Today there are several public and private agencies serving the region.

== History ==
The area of Eden Township comprises five land grants given by the Mexican government: Sobrante Rancho, Rancho San Leandro (given to José Joaquín Estudillo), Rancho San Lorenzo, (given to Guillermo Castro), Rancho San Lorenzito (given to Francisco and Barbara Soto), and Rancho Arroyo de la Alameda (given to José de Jesús Vallejo).

In 1850, when California became a state, Eden was within Contra Costa County. In 1853, Alameda County was established from five townships of Contra Costa County, as well as Washington Township from Santa Clara county. In 1856, Eden Township was given one seat on the Alameda County board of supervisors.

Eden Township was known as a major poultry producing area from the late 19th to the early 20th century.

== Geographic features ==
The region stretches from the marshes of San Francisco Bay on the west to the borders of Contra Costa County and Murray Township to the east. The eastern side is hilly, surrounding Castro Valley and the flatlands of Hayward. San Leandro and San Lorenzo creeks traverse Eden Township from east to west. San Leandro Creek flows through Lake Chabot, an artificial reservoir that was formerly used for drinking water.

== Services ==
Although the township is no longer run by a single governmental body, several services still operate using this area as an administrative district.

The Eden Health District was founded in 1948 to operate Eden Hospital in Castro Valley. It is run by a board of directors elected by residents of the district. After 1998, the district no longer operates Eden Hospital, but operates to provide grants to medical organizations. It is funded entirely by leasing the office buildings it owns.

Eden Township Substation is a division of Alameda County Sheriff's office that includes the unincorporated areas of Eden Township, as well as other unincorporated areas, such as Sunol and Livermore Valley. Its office is located on Foothill Blvd in San Leandro.

Castro Valley/Eden Area Chamber of Commerce is a private association of businesses located in Castro Valley, San Lorenzo, Ashland, and Cherryland. Besides promoting local businesses, it also hosts and participates in local community events.

Eden Area Regional Occupational Program provides career technical training for both high school students and adults in the area. It is offered through a partnership with Chabot College, Castro Valley Unified School District, and San Lorenzo Unified School District.
