= Japanese Gardens (Hayward, California) =

Public Japanese gardens in California

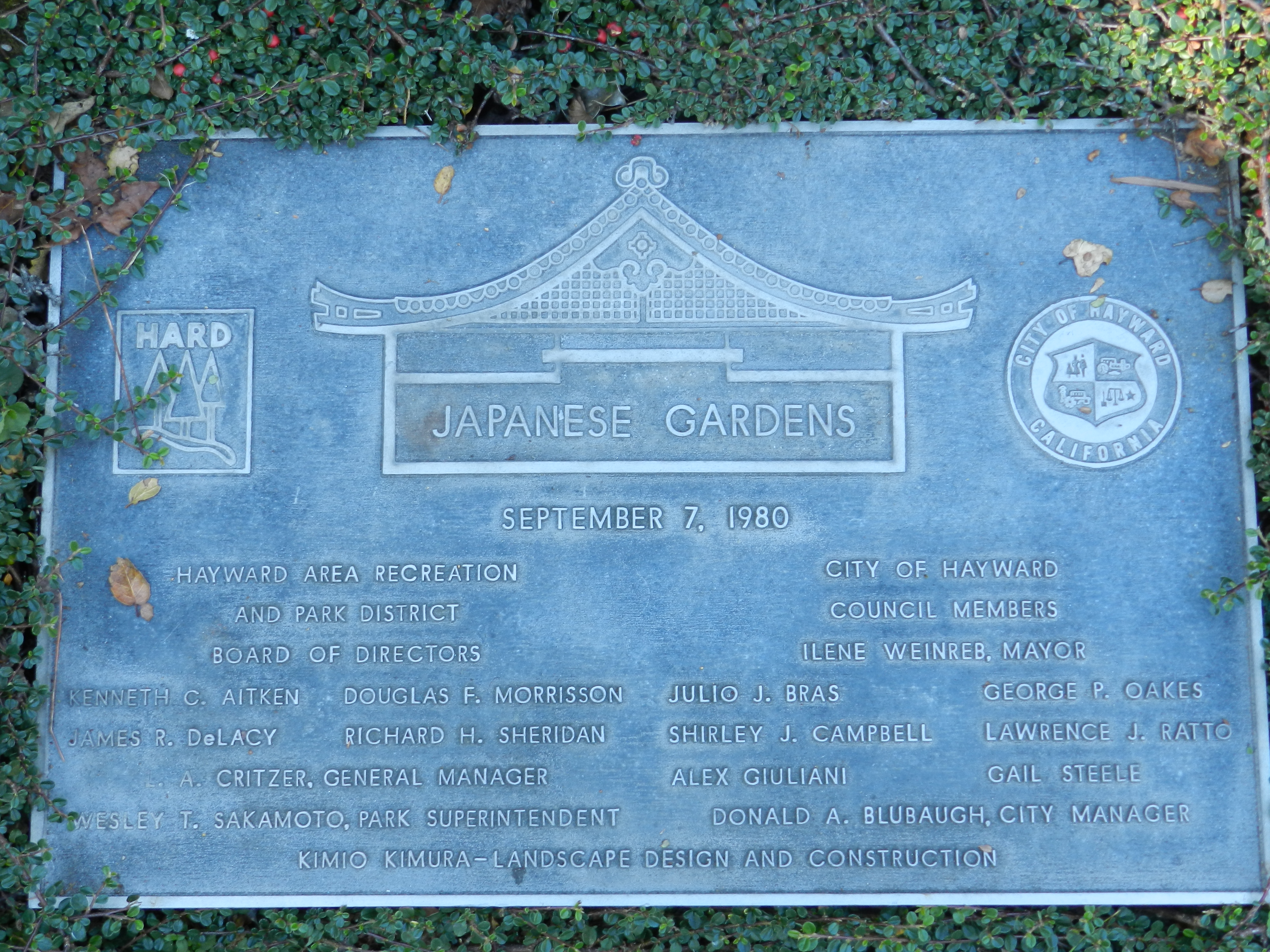
- Dedication plaque
- Interactive map of Japanese Gardens
- Type: garden
- Location: Hayward, California, United States
- Coordinates: 37.680580°N 122.079972°W
- Area: 3.5 acres (0.014 km^{2}; 0.0055 sq mi)
- Created: 1980
- Operator: Hayward Area Recreation and Park District
- Open: 8 a.m - 4 p.m. daily

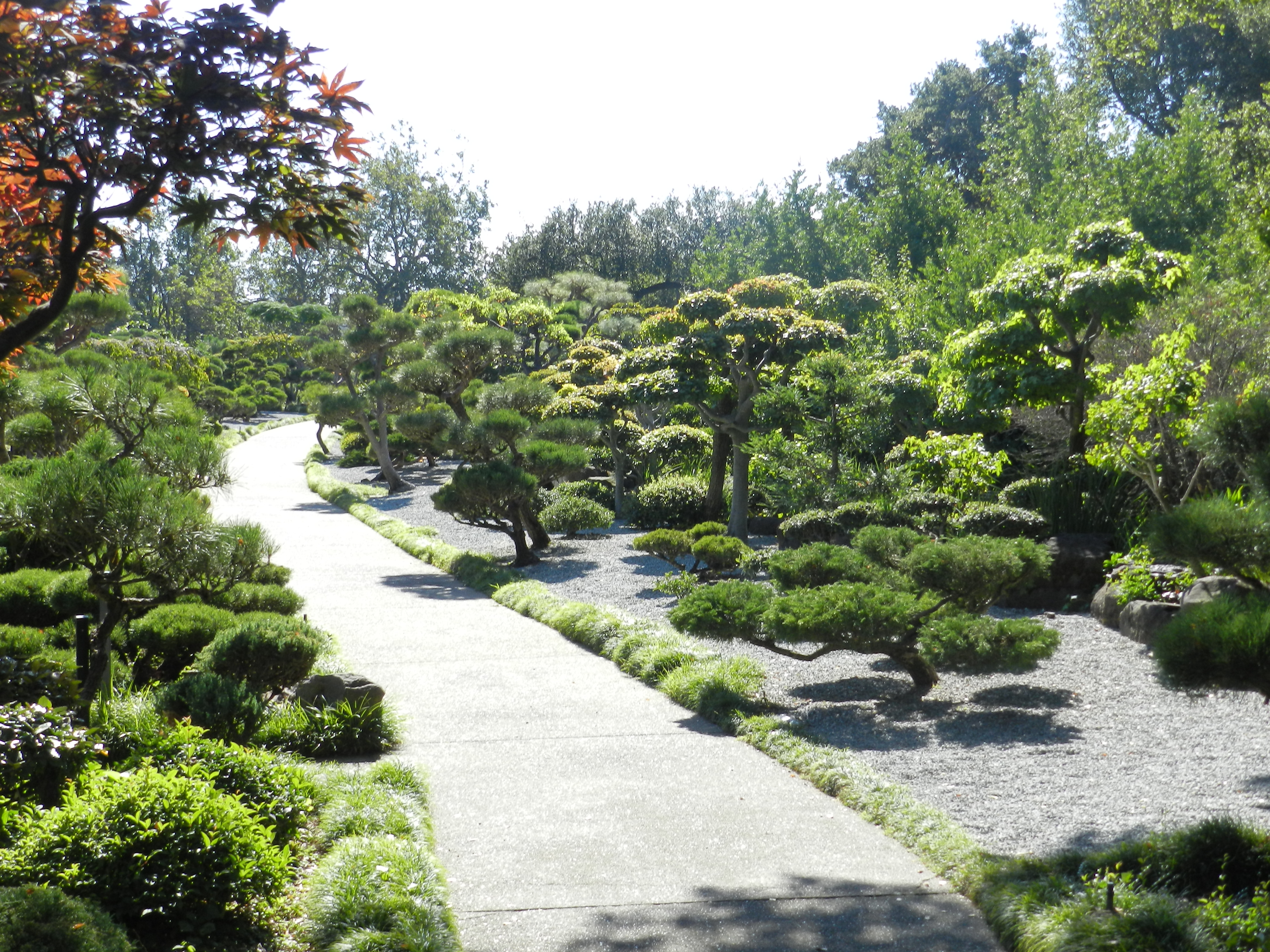
Japanese Gardens

The Hayward Japanese Gardens are the oldest traditional-style Japanese gardens in California. The gardens are maintained by the recreation and park district of Hayward.

== History ==
The site formerly housed the Hayward High School agricultural studies program, from 1913 to 1962. The land was designated as a future park site in 1962, with HARD beginning the acquisition process in 1972. The park's current area was fully acquired by 1976, and the park was dedicated in 1980.

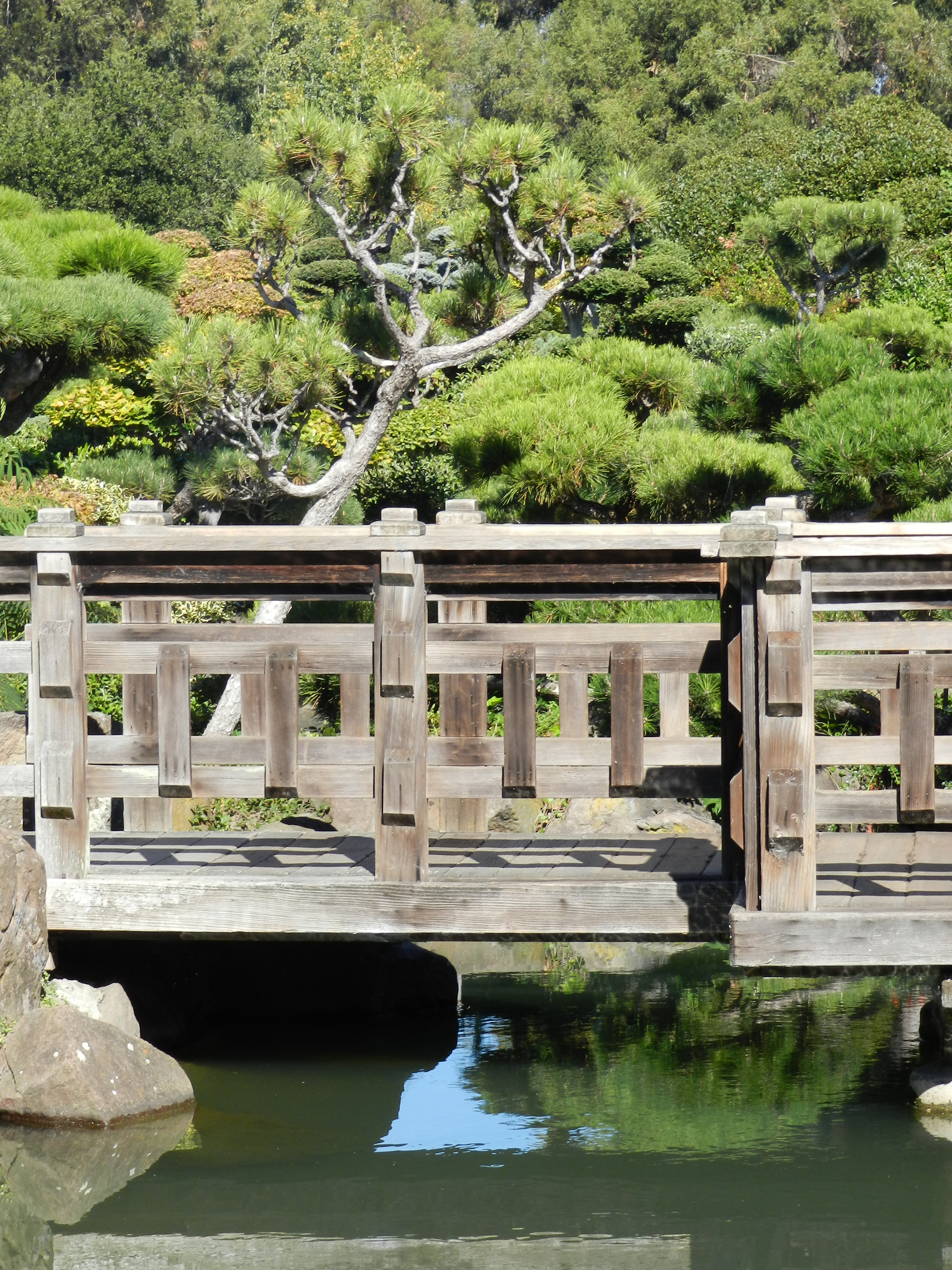
Bridge

== Design ==
The garden was designed by Kimio Kimura. It follows Japanese garden design principles, using California native stone and plants. The garden contains over 70 plant species including mondo grasses, Japanese black pine, cedar, juniper, and rhododendron. No stains were used on the wood constructions. Nails and fasteners are recessed, and all wood was notched, and aged, to simulate the appearance of a traditional Japanese garden.

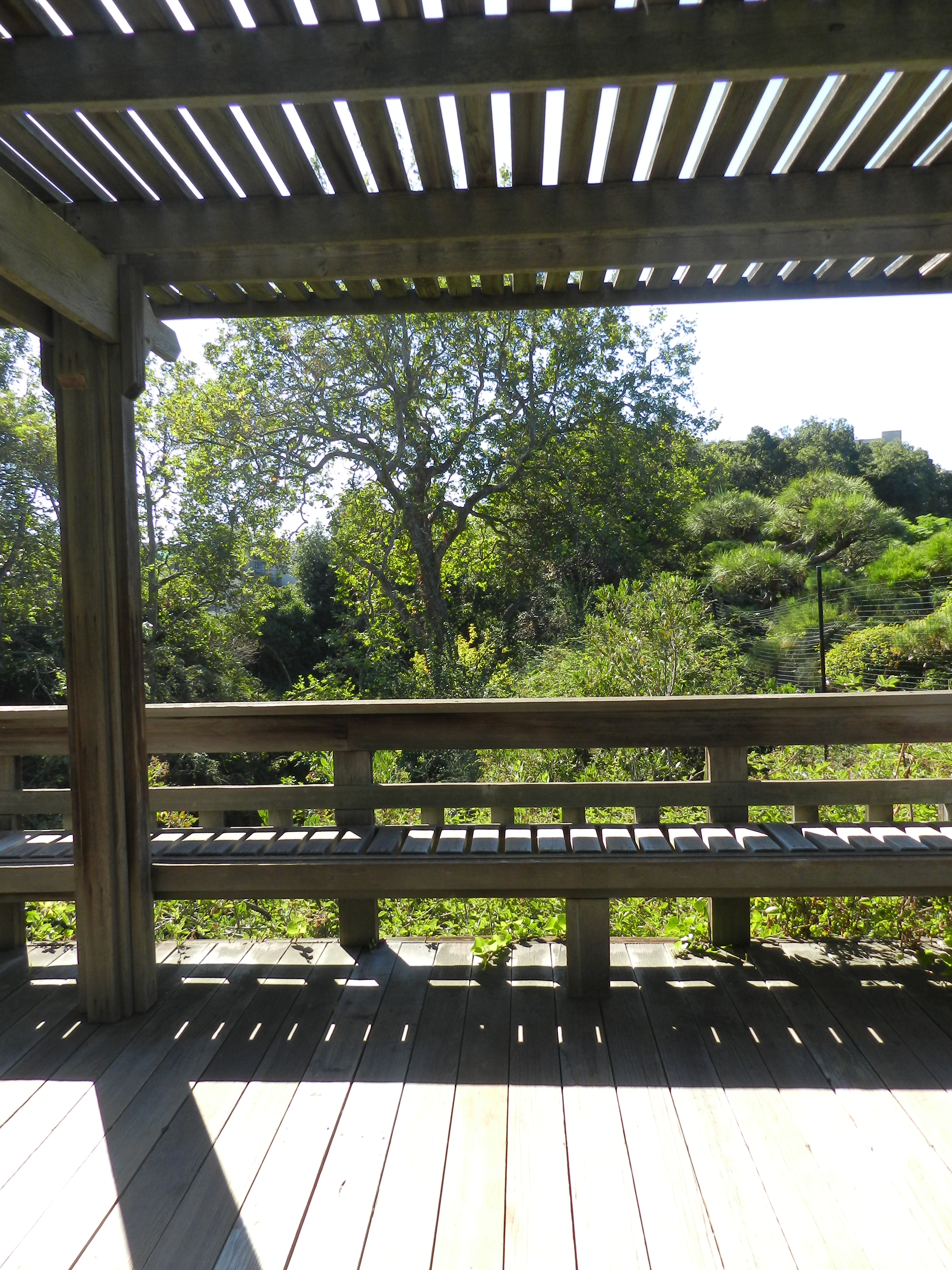
Gardens as viewed from observation deck

== Activities ==
The Japanese Gardens are open to the public daily except Christmas. The site hosts weddings.
