= Alameda County Human Relations Commission =

American governmental organization

Coordinates: 37.65°N 121.91°W

The Human Relations Commission is the governmental organization appointed by the Alameda County Board of Supervisors in the United States to advise them on community issues including education, employment, and public safety. The commission has power to conduct studies on current intergroup conditions, provide recommendations for volatile situations, and propose long-term solutions to promote acceptance of diversity.

The Human Relations Commission is a body appointed by the Alameda County Board of Supervisors to advise them on community issues such as education, employment, and public safety. The commission has the power to conduct studies on current intergroup conditions, provide recommendations for volatile situations, and propose long-term solutions to promote acceptance of diversity.

The commission consists of up to sixteen commissioners, three members appointed by each County Supervisor and one member appointed by the Mayors' Conference. Commissioners serve a three-year appointment. Positions are currently available.

The Human Relations Commission is located with the Alameda County Social Services Agency.

== Commissioners ==
Board-wide: Lee Thomas

District 1: Tejinder Dhami, Fahria Khan, Steven Medeiros

District 2: Olga Borjon, Smile Dhir, Manjinder "Monty" Sandhu

District 3: Hermy Almonte, Lara Maxey, Royl Roberts

District 4: Rocquel Johnson, James Walker

District 5: Miguel Dwin, Yana Kusayeva, Cameron Monfared

== Bylaws ==
Unless the provision or context otherwise requires, the definitions shall govern the construction of these by-laws.

== Meetings ==
Members of the public may address the commission regarding any item.

== Awards ==
The County Human Relations Commission presented its annual "Excellence in Human Relations" Award at the October 18, 2016 Supervisors' Board meeting. The award is presented to individuals and organizations who, through their diligent efforts, have made significant contributions in providing for, and furthering, the cause of bringing people together, improving communications, helping to make their community safer, and serving those who are in need. Awardees were presented their plaque by the respective Supervisor in which district the awardees lives and/or works. Nominations for the award are conducted by the Human Relations Commission starting in August and may include those who live and/or work in Alameda County.
