= John Lewelling =

American horticulturist (1811–1883)

John Lewelling (1811-1883) was a pioneer horticulturist, granger, and banker in California, where he worked from 1853 until his death in 1883. According to the California Horticultural Society, he was “the Father of California Horticulture.”

== Early life ==
John Lewelling was born January 16, 1811, in Randolph County, North Carolina, the third child of Meshack and Jane Lewelling. Slavery was expanding at this time, and new laws were making it harder for Black people to gain their freedom. Frustration over slavery may have led Meshack Lewelling to join the Religious Society of Friends in 1816 and to enroll his children as well. In 1822 the family migrated to Henry County, Indiana, in search of good, inexpensive land in a free state. They settled near the Quaker village of Greensboro, where they cleared land and planted fruit trees and Meshack Lewelling taught his children to graft.

In 1832, John Lewelling married another Quaker, Elvina Elliott, or Elvy. The next year he and his brother Henderson each bought from the federal government an 80-acre parcel near their parents' farm and began clearing the land. They planted grafted fruit trees—pear, peach, and especially apple—and started a nursery and orchard business.

== In Iowa ==
In 1837, Henderson Lewelling, with his wife and children, made another migration, to Iowa, a free territory newly open to American settlement. They followed other Quaker families to the new town of Salem, near both the Des Moines and Mississippi rivers. John Lewelling, his brother William, and their families soon joined Henderson's family, in time for the first government land sale in the area, in November 1838. John probably returned to Indiana afterward, to run the orchards and nursery there until 1841. Henderson, meanwhile, began establishing the Cedar Grove Botanic Garden and Nursery near Salem.

While practicing horticulture together, the three brothers and their wives also became active members of the new Salem Monthly Meeting and worked on what would come to be called the Underground Railroad, helping fugitive slaves from Missouri escape to freedom in Canada. The brothers and their wives were among the founders of the Salem Anti-Slavery Society, which allied with activists in other communities and other Christian denominations. This cooperation with non-Quakers led to the Lewellings' expulsion from the Salem Monthly Meeting. With other abolitionists, they created their own Quaker meeting--the Salem Monthly Meeting of Anti-Slavery Friends. In 1843, the Lewellings and other activists formed the Iowa Anti-Slavery Society and organized a Liberty Party ticket.

John Lewelling was left to run the nursery and orchard business in Iowa after Henderson left for Oregon on the Overland Trail, in the spring of 1847, and after William Lewelling's death, in the fall of the same year.

== On the West Coast ==
John was reunited with his younger brother Seth Lewelling, in 1850, when the two traveled the Overland Trail together to mine gold in California. In the fall they sailed together to Oregon to join their brother Henderson Lewelling, who had established a horticultural business in Milwaukie. John and Seth worked for Henderson and his partner, William Meek, through the following two winters, with another trip to the mines in between.

While Seth Lewelling remained in Oregon, John returned to Iowa, in 1852, to fetch his wife, their five children, and a son-in-law and bring them west via Vanderbilt's Nicaragua route. In California, in 1853, John partnered with Elias Beard, who had bought Rancho Ex-Mission San José. John planted various orchard crops and berries on the rancho. He became one of the first major cherry growers in California, and he introduced to the state red currants, which soon became Alameda County's leading crop.

In 1855 John bought 117 acres in San Lorenzo, on the north bank of San Lorenzo Creek. His plantings at San Lorenzo soon included a variety of tree fruits, berries, and nuts, and his wholesale and retail nursery became one of the state's largest. In 1860 William Meek bought land on the opposite side of the creek and planted his own cherries, currants, and other fruits and nuts. The two became California's leading producers of cherries and currants. John also gained recognition as a fruit breeder for his Lewelling's Prolific almond, which eventually became one of California's leading almond varieties. In addition, he served on the Alameda County Board of Supervisors, as a director of the Alameda County Agricultural Society, and as vice-president of the San Francisco Bay District Agricultural Society.

In 1864 John bought a farm near St. Helena, in Napa Valley, leaving his son Eli Lewelling in charge of the San Lorenzo farm. John expanded the St. Helena farm, to a total of 537 acres, in 1868 and 1870. In St. Helena John specialized in grapes, which at first he dried into raisins and sold fresh, and in almonds. Like other St. Helena farmers, he soon began growing grapes for wine, and making wine for national sales. Along with Charles Krug, John was a founding member of the St. Helena Vinicultural Club. Because of his extensive horticultural experience, he became a leader among the "winegrowers," as they called themselves. John became the proprietor of the winegrowers' bonded warehouse and led in the construction of the St. Helena Viticultural Hall. He served on the Phylloxera Committee, which searched local vineyards for signs of infection, and taught other farmers to graft grapes to thwart the pest. He developed a new grape cultivar, the Lewelling Prolific. He became Worthy Master of the St. Helena Grange and represented Napa County to the state Grange. In 1875 he was elected treasurer of the California Grangers' Business Association. He led the revival of the California Horticultural Society and represented Napa County at the Convention of California Fruit Growers.John was also a banker; in 1882 he became president of the Granger' Bank of California, of which he was one of the largest shareholders, and a founding director of the Bank of St. Helena.

John Lewelling died of a lymphatic infection on December 25, 1883. After his death, the California Horticultural Society declared him "the Father of California Horticulture".
