= Cherryland, California =

Unincorporated community in California, United States

Cherryland
- Unincorporated Community; Census-designated place
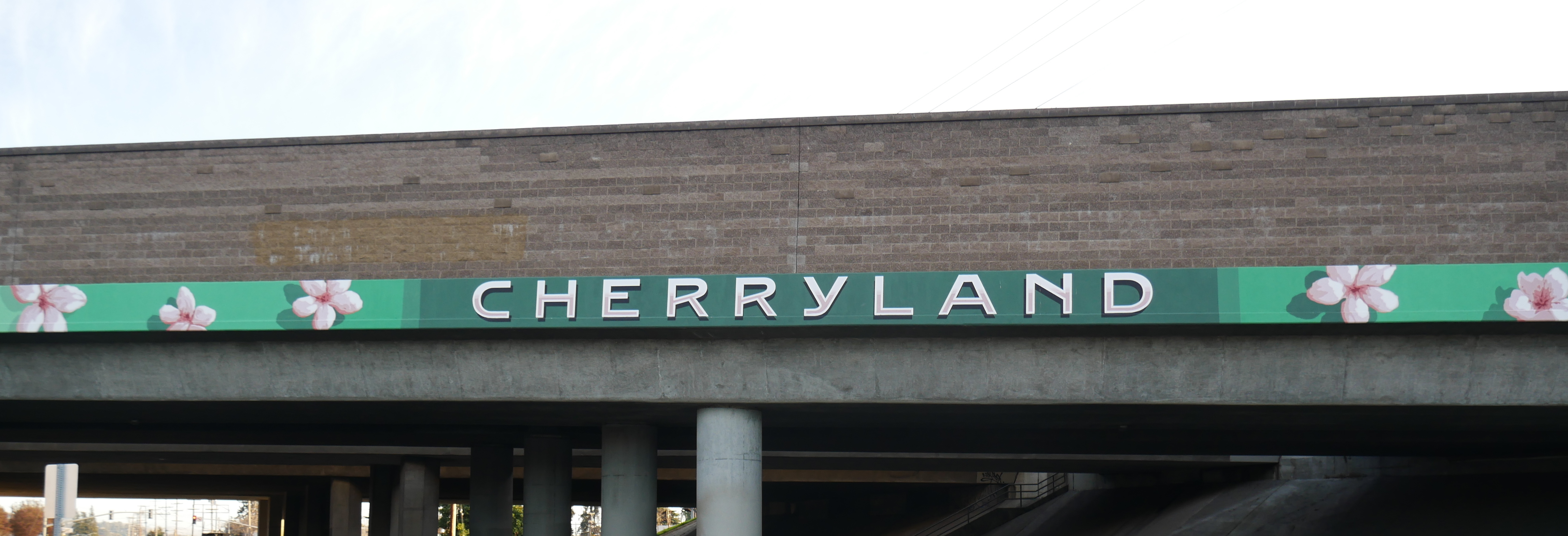
- Interactive map of Cherryland
- Location in the United States
- Coordinates: 37°40′46″N 122°06′12″W
- Country: United States
- State: California
- County: Alameda

Government
  - State senator: Vacant
  - Assemblymember: Liz Ortega (D)
  - U. S. rep.: Aisha Wahab (D)

Area
  - Total: 1.19 sq mi (3.09 km^{2})
  - Land: 1.19 sq mi (3.09 km^{2})
  - Water: 0 sq mi (0.00 km^{2}) 0%
- Elevation: 66 ft (20 m)

Population (2020)
  - Total: 15,808
  - Density: 13,246.5/sq mi (5,114.51/km^{2})
- Time zone: UTC-8 (Pacific)
  - Summer (DST): UTC-7 (PDT)
- ZIP code: 94541
- Area code: 510, 341
- FIPS code: 06-12902
- GNIS feature IDs: 1867005, 2408020

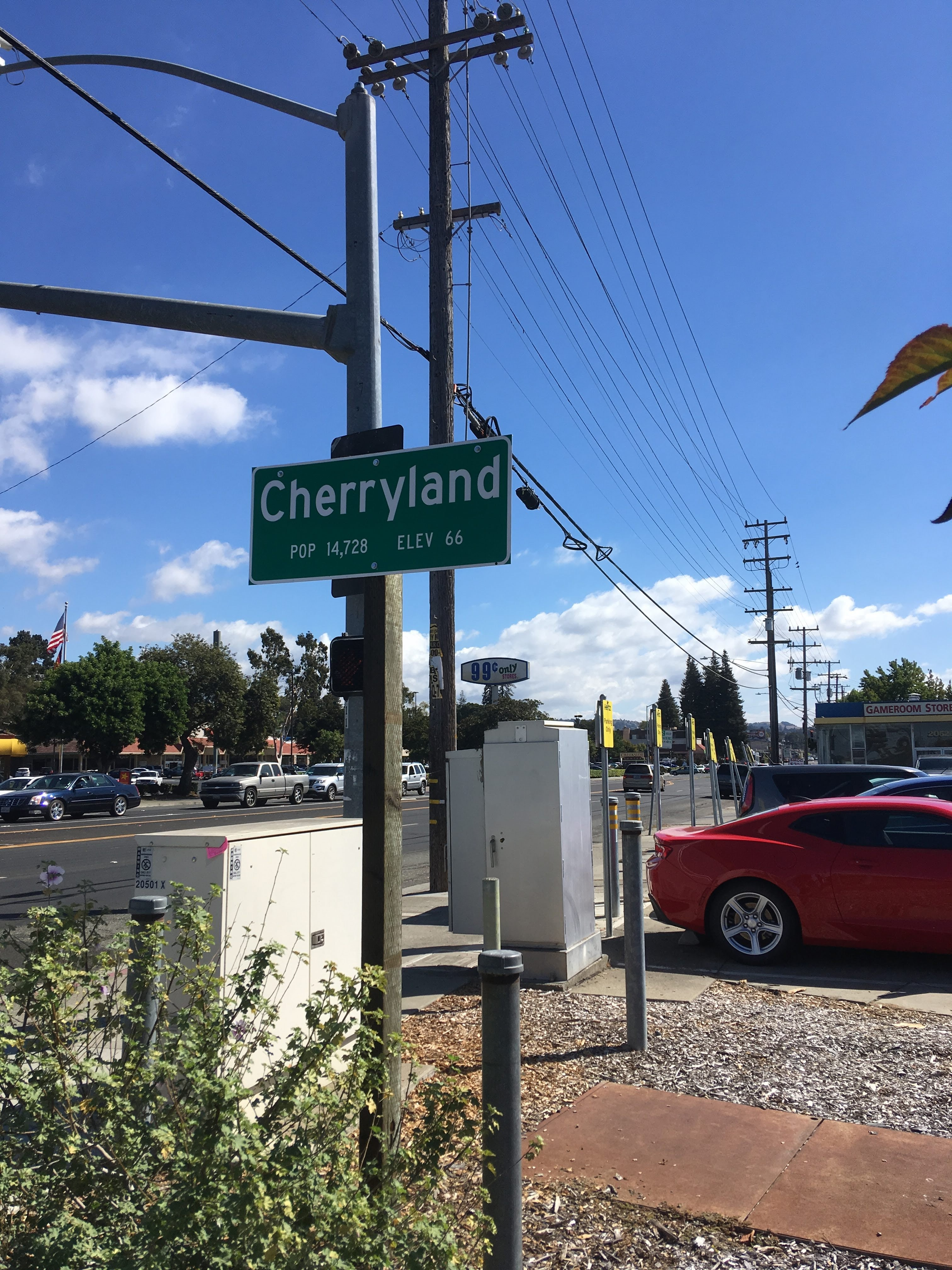
Downtown Cherryland sign across from Creekside Center

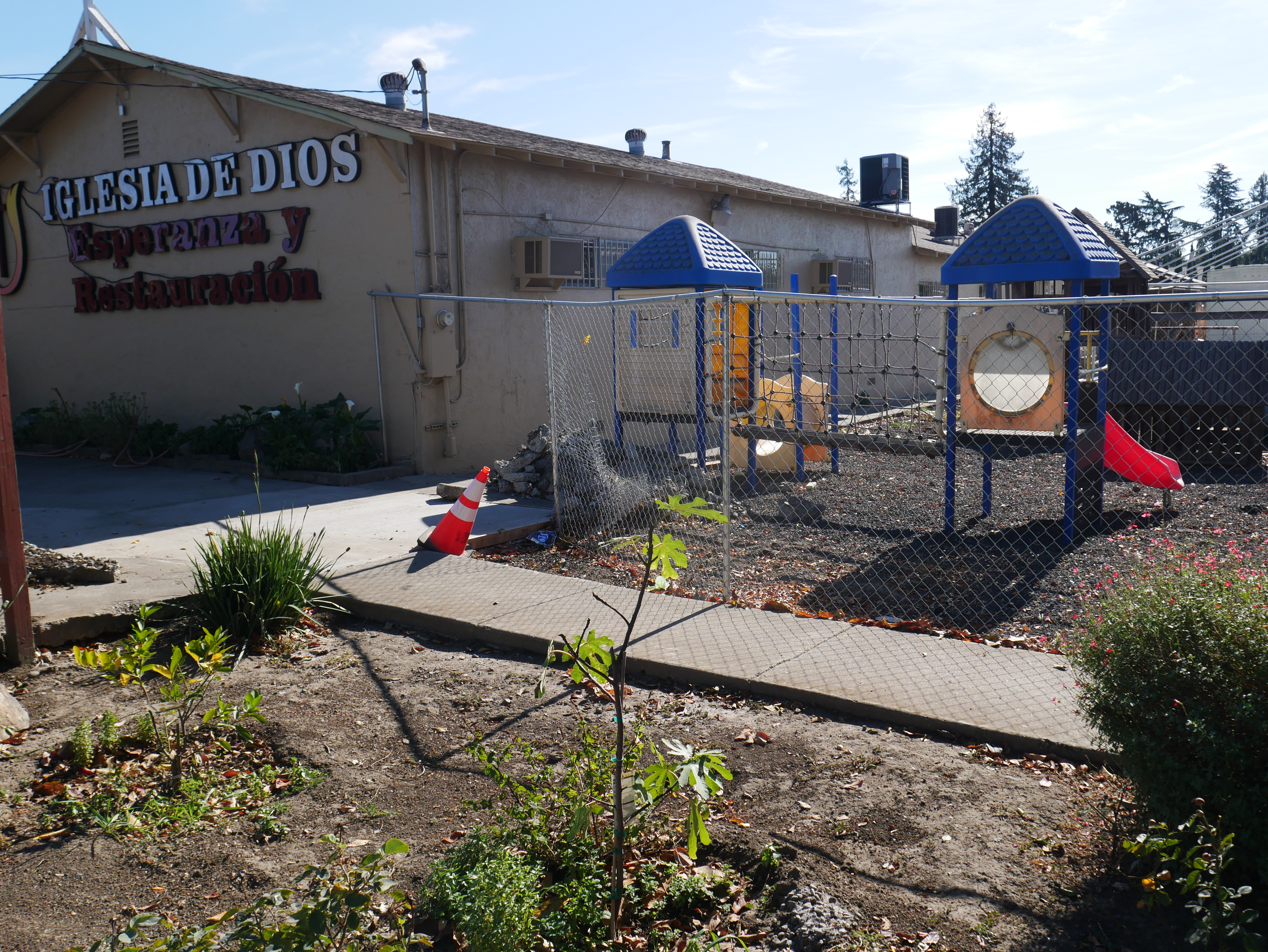
Hispanic church along Hampton Rd in Cherryland

Cherryland is an unincorporated community and census-designated place (CDP) in Alameda County, California, United States. Cherryland is located in the historic Eden Township between Ashland to the north and the city of Hayward to the south. The population was 15,808 at the 2020 census.

== History ==
Cherryland largely comprises the residential subdivision of the vast orchards (2,200 acres (8.9 km^{2})) of San Lorenzo pioneer William Meek, often called the "first farmer" of Alameda County. "Cherryland" was the name of one huge subdivision of this farm initiated by third-generation heirs in 1911. The Meek Mansion is located on Hampton Road in the northern part of Cherryland. The mansion is maintained by the Hayward Area Recreation and Park District, in conjunction with the Hayward Area Historical Society.

== Geography ==
According to the United States Census Bureau, the CDP has a total area of 1.2 square miles (3.1 km^{2}), all land. San Lorenzo Creek runs partly through the unincorporated community and defines most of the unincorporated community's northern border.

=== Climate ===
This region experiences warm (but not hot) and dry summers, with no average monthly temperatures above 71.6 °F. According to the Köppen Climate Classification system, Cherryland has a warm-summer Mediterranean climate, abbreviated "Csb" on climate maps.

== Demographics ==
Historical population
Census	Pop.	Note	%±
1970	9,969		—
1980	9,425		−5.5%
1990	11,088		17.6%
2000	13,837		24.8%
2010	14,728		6.4%
2020	15,808		7.3%
U.S. Decennial Census; 1860–1870 1880-1890; 1900 1910 1920; 1930 1940 1950; 1960 1970 1980; 1990 2000 2010; 2020

Cherryland first appeared as an unincorporated community in the 1970 U.S. census; and as a census-designated place in the 1980 United States census.

=== Racial and ethnic composition ===
Cherryland CDP, California – Racial and ethnic composition Note: the US Census treats Hispanic/Latino as an ethnic category. This table excludes Latinos from the racial categories and assigns them to a separate category. Hispanics/Latinos may be of any race.
Race / Ethnicity (NH = Non-Hispanic)	Pop 2000	Pop 2010	Pop 2020	% 2000	% 2010	% 2020
White alone (NH)	4,933	3,071	2,279	35.65%	20.85%	14.42%
Black or African American alone (NH)	1,309	1,585	1,299	9.46%	10.76%	8.22%
Native American or Alaska Native alone (NH)	62	62	54	0.45%	0.42%	0.34%
Asian alone (NH)	1,111	1,354	2,133	8.03%	9.19%	13.49%
Native Hawaiian or Pacific Islander alone (NH)	162	277	283	1.17%	1.88%	1.79%
Other race alone (NH)	28	23	88	0.20%	0.16%	0.56%
Mixed race or Multiracial (NH)	458	401	493	3.31%	2.72%	3.12%
Hispanic or Latino (any race)	5,774	7,955	9,179	41.73%	54.01%	58.07%
Total	13,837	14,728	15,808	100.00%	100.00%	100.00%

=== 2020 census ===
As of the 2020 census, Cherryland had a population of 15,808. The population density was 13,250.6 inhabitants per square mile (5,116.1/km^{2}). The racial makeup of Cherryland was 19.8% White, 8.7% African American, 2.5% Native American, 13.9% Asian, 1.9% Pacific Islander, 38.6% from other races, and 14.6% from two or more races. Hispanic or Latino of any race were 58.1% of the population.

The age distribution was 23.6% under the age of 18, 9.4% aged 18 to 24, 31.7% aged 25 to 44, 23.7% aged 45 to 64, and 11.6% who were 65 years of age or older. The median age was 35.2 years. For every 100 females, there were 100.8 males, and for every 100 females age 18 and over, there were 101.1 males age 18 and over.

The Census reported that 97.8% of the population lived in households, 1.2% lived in non-institutionalized group quarters, and 1.1% were institutionalized. 100.0% of residents lived in urban areas, while 0.0% lived in rural areas.

There were 4,922 households, out of which 39.3% included children under the age of 18, 42.9% were married-couple households, 7.9% were cohabiting couple households, 26.9% had a female householder with no partner present, and 22.3% had a male householder with no partner present. 22.5% of households were one person, and 7.9% were one person aged 65 or older. The average household size was 3.14. There were 3,387 families (68.8% of all households).

There were 5,125 housing units at an average density of 4,295.9 units per square mile (1,658.7 units/km^{2}), of which 4,922 (96.0%) were occupied. Of these, 30.3% were owner-occupied, and 69.7% were occupied by renters. Of all housing units, 4.0% were vacant; the homeowner vacancy rate was 0.4% and the rental vacancy rate was 2.6%.

=== Demographic estimates ===
In 2023, the US Census Bureau estimated that 37.2% of the population were foreign-born. Of all people aged 5 or older, 43.0% spoke only English at home, 42.7% spoke Spanish, 3.1% spoke other Indo-European languages, 9.9% spoke Asian or Pacific Islander languages, and 1.3% spoke other languages. Of those aged 25 or older, 70.2% were high school graduates and 17.6% had a bachelor's degree.

=== Income and poverty ===
The median household income was $84,858, and the per capita income was $34,805. About 5.9% of families and 11.2% of the population were below the poverty line.

== Parks and recreation ==
Park and recreation services are provided by Hayward Area Recreation and Park District.

== Government ==
Cherryland is an unincorporated community of Alameda County, and thus is overseen by the Alameda County Board of Supervisors. In 2019, the Board of Supervisors created the Eden Area Municipal Advisory Council, an appointed council of seven community members, to assist the Board of Supervisors in policy decision making.

== Education ==
Cherryland is served by the Hayward Unified School District to the south and the San Lorenzo Unified School District to the north.

== Infrastructure ==
Water supply is provided by the East Bay Municipal Utility District and sanitation services by the Oro Loma Sanitary District Most other utility services are provided by private companies.

== Public safety ==
The area is policed by the Alameda County Sheriff's Office and the California Highway Patrol. Fire and EMT services provided by Alameda County Fire Department.

== Community organizations ==
There are a number of volunteer community organizations including the Cherryland Community Association and Padres Unidos.
