= Meek Mansion =

Historic house in California, United States

- Meek Mansion and Carriage House
- U.S. National Register of Historic Places
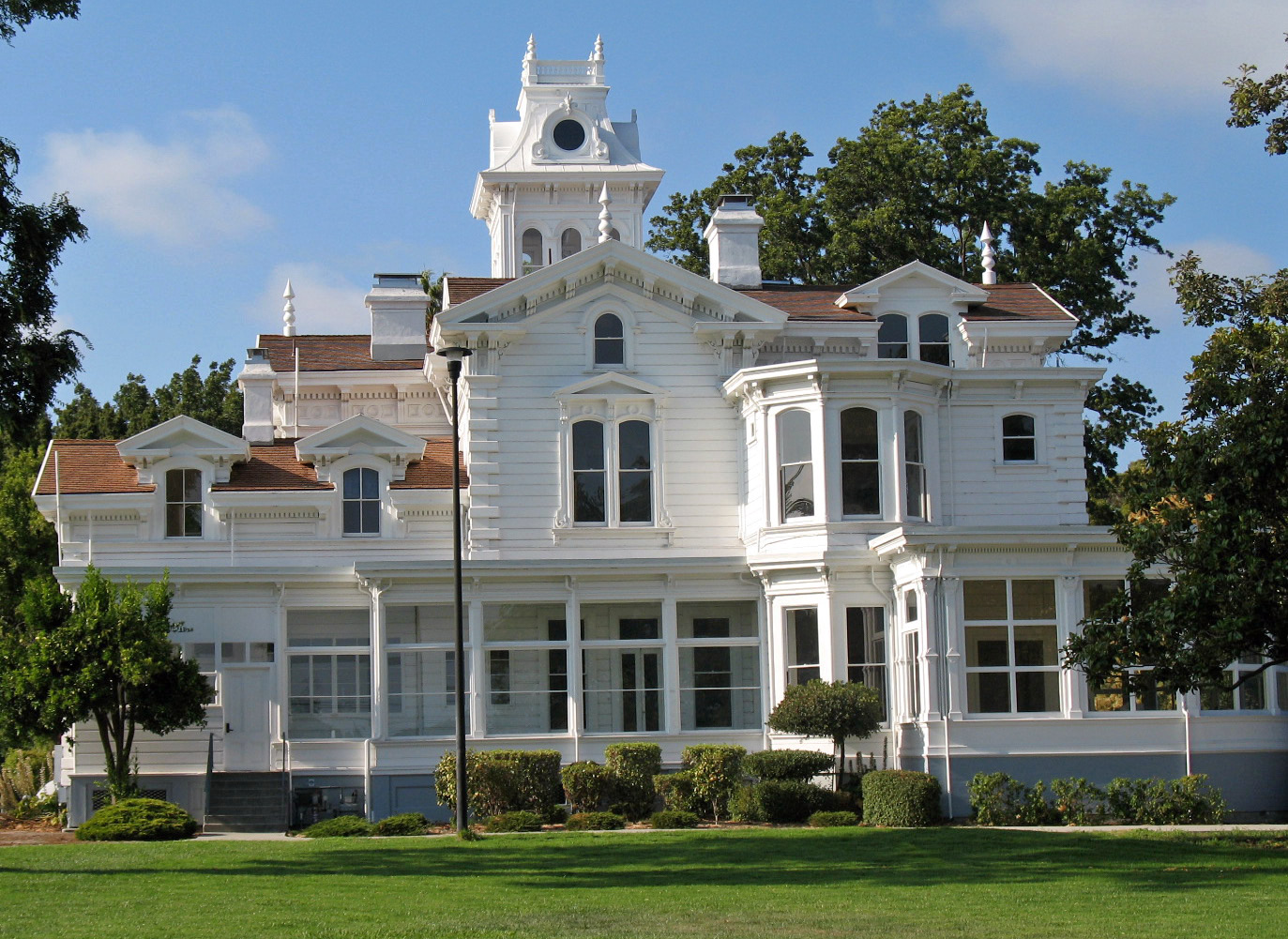
- Meek Mansion in 2008, photographed from the south end of Meek Park

- Location within San Francisco Bay Area Location within California
- Location: 240 Hampton Rd., Hayward, California
- Coordinates: 37°41′6″N 122°6′45″W
- Area: 10 acres (4.0 ha)
- Built: 1869
- Architectural style: Second Empire, Italian Villa
- NRHP reference No.: 73000393
- Added to NRHP: June 04, 1973

The Meek Mansion is a historic mansion in unincorporated Cherryland, California, just north of Hayward. It is listed on the National Register of Historic Places. Located on nearly 10 acres, the Victorian house was built in 1869 by William Meek.

== History ==
William Meek came to the West Coast in 1847, carrying seeds and grafted trees, via the Oregon Trail. He first settled in the Willamette Valley in Oregon, and he moved, in 1859, to Alameda County, where he spent the rest of his life.

By the time his mansion was built, Meek owned everything from Mission Boulevard to Hesperian Boulevard, and from Lewelling Boulevard to slightly past Winton Avenue, totaling around 3,000 acres (12 km^{2}). The grounds were primarily filled with cherry, apricot, plum, and almond trees, and red currant bushes. The area became known as Cherryland because of the abundance of cherry trees Meek planted. Meek became a prominent citizen during the remainder of his life, including being a trustee of Mills College and a County Supervisor for Alameda County. After his death in 1880, at the age of 63, Meek left his estate to his children, and the last ten acres remained in the Meek family until 1940.

The Milton Ream family bought the last 10 acres of the original 3,000 in 1964. In 1964 the home was purchased for $270,000 by the Hayward Area Recreation and Park District (HARD). In 1965, the home was opened to the public and was used for weddings, tours, workshops, and even plays re-creating local history. The mansion became a California Point of Historical Interest in 1972 and placed on the National Register of Historic Landmarks in 1973. However, the mansion was closed in 1982 due to wear and tear because of overuse. In 1991, HARD began to work with the Hayward Area Historical Society (HAHS) to upgrade and reopen the home.

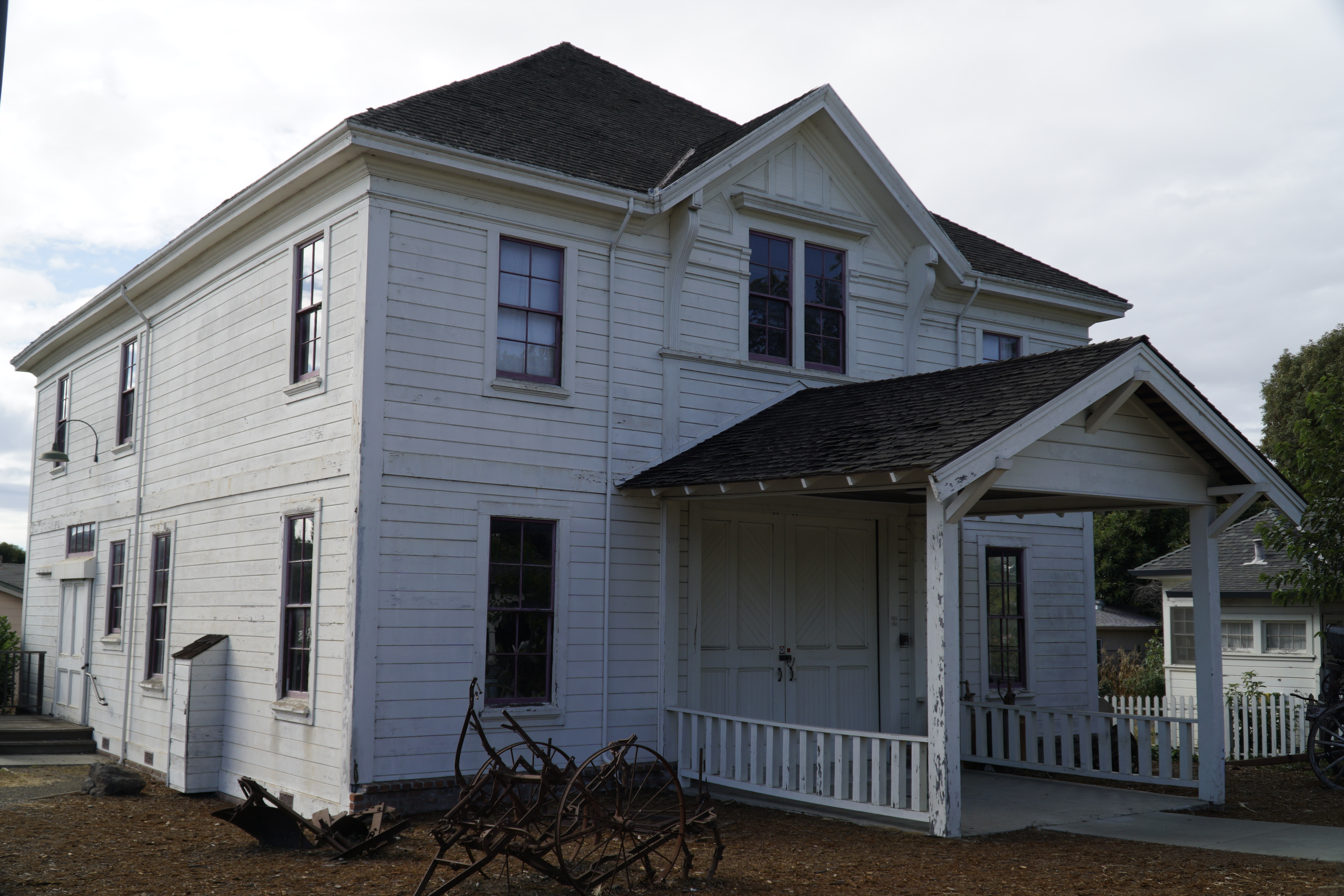
Meek Mansion's carriage house (2018)

Between 1964 and 2004, HARD spent $1.9 million in restoring the mansion, its carriage house, and grounds. After decades of review, in 2004 HARD agreed upon a deal to lease the mansion and its accompanying carriage house to the historical society for 25 years. HARD would continue to manage the accompanying acreage of park land surrounding the mansion and would continue to be consulted by the historical society with respect to planning and completing renovations. As of 2009, HAHS was reported to have spent about $600,000 in restorations, some of which involved upgrading the heating and plumbing systems. Completion of the restoration work will require an estimated $1 million to $1.5 million.

Once renovations are completed, the historical society plans on opening the mansion as a house museum where people may take paid tours focusing on the different historical eras the house has gone through.

An adjacent property, formerly part of the Meek estate, is now a historic fruit orchard, agricultural demonstration garden, and museum.

== Architecture ==
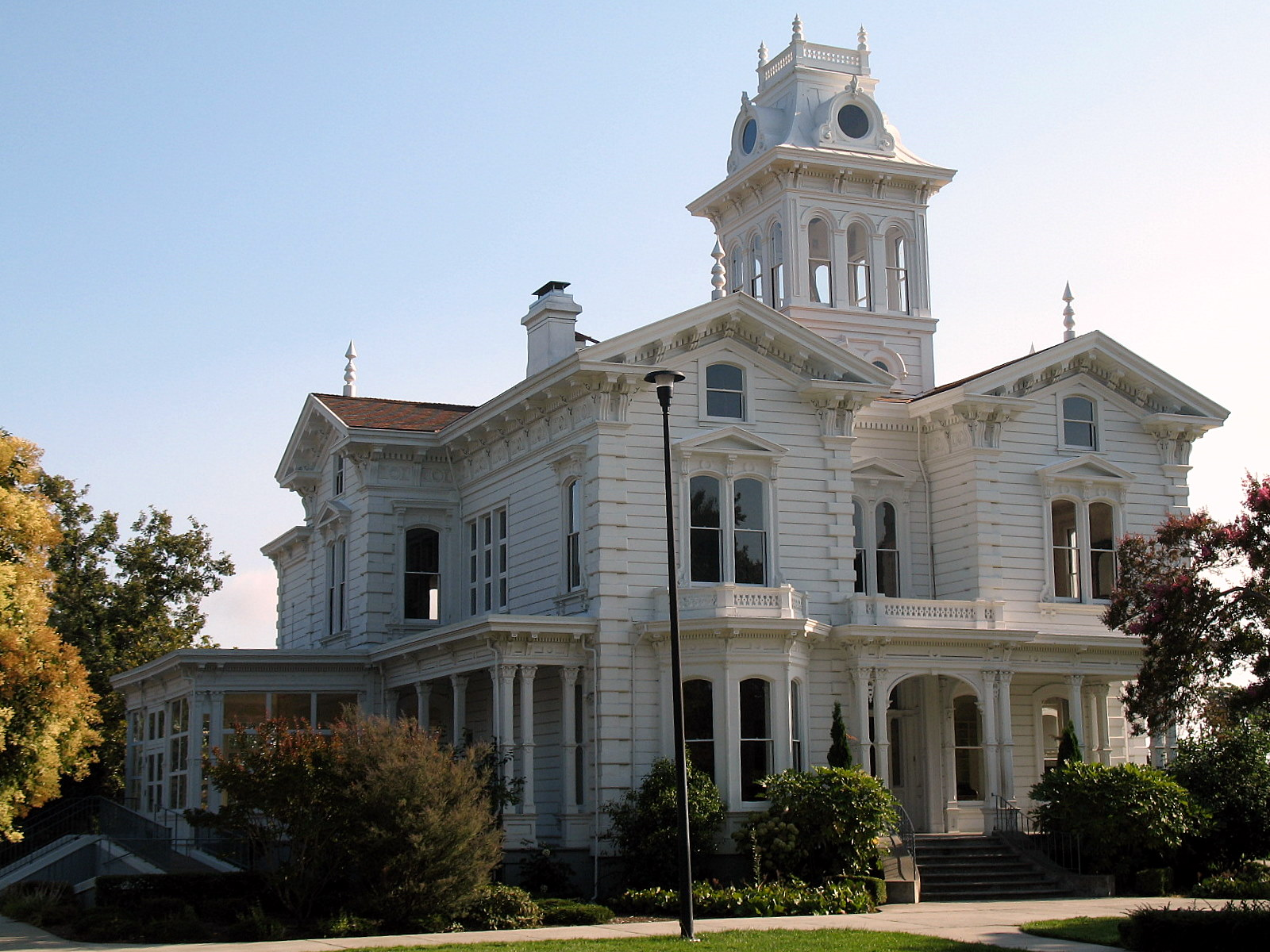
A view from another face of the mansion

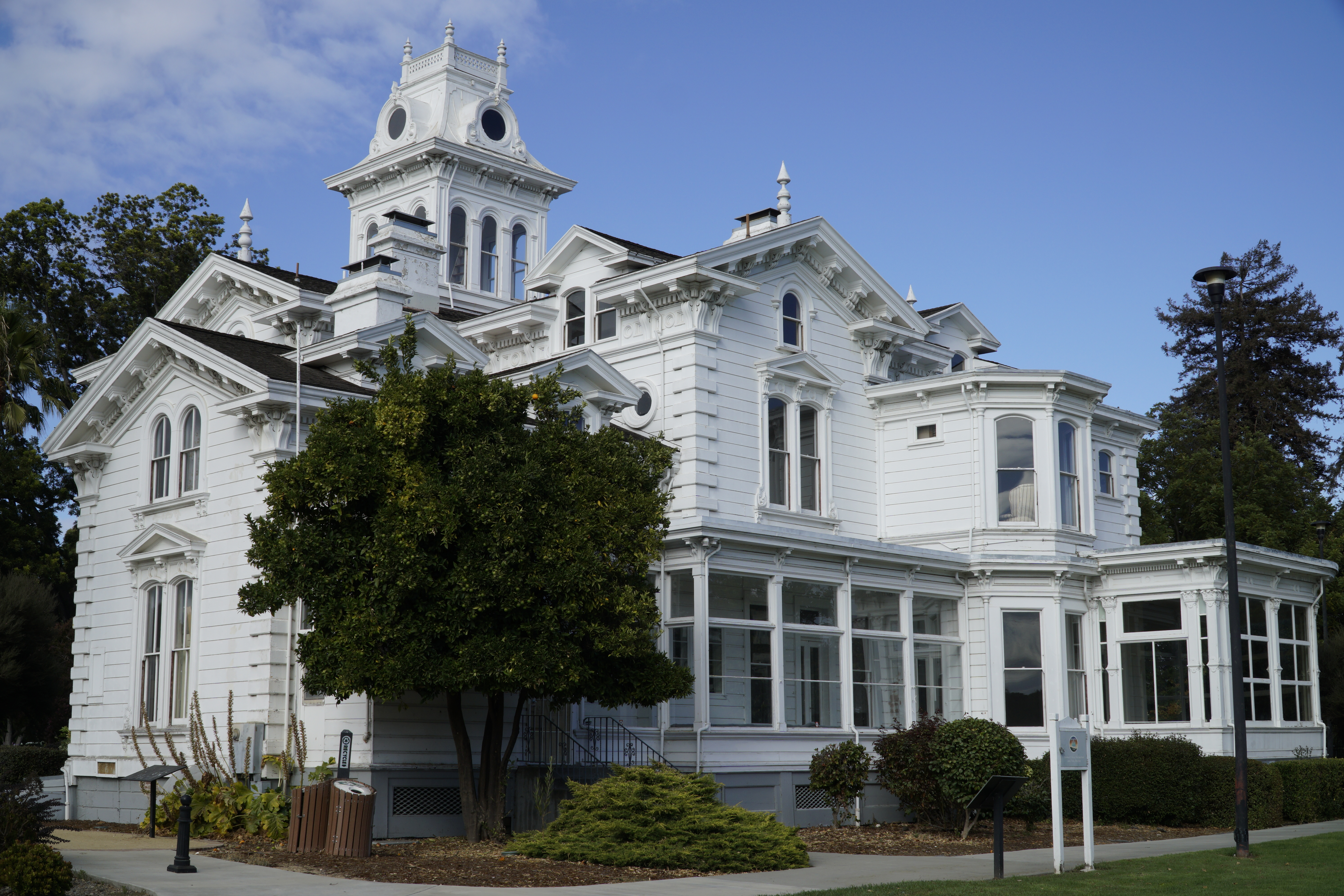
Another view of the mansion in 2018

The 7,902-square-foot (734.1 m^{2}) mansion contains between 23 and 27 rooms (sources vary) located on three above-ground levels, with a cupola on the third floor. The home also contains a basement below-ground which has an "unusual" bracing system consisting of thick, diagonally placed timber boards. Having a bracing system such as this was uncommon in buildings in the area, but was a wise move due to the faults in the area. Other architectural assets are "a mansard roof, a bull's-eye window in the central tower, and paired, arched windows". As of 2006, local historians were still unsure of who designed and built the house.

The edifice itself currently resides on 9.75 acres (3.95 ha) of land, which functions as a park with picnic areas, paths, and benches.

Throughout the years, the house has undergone several renovations. In 1910, bathrooms and running water were added to the home by Meek's son who resided there. In the 1940s, the Ream family remodeled the kitchen, which is currently still intact, and added bedroom and ballroom space.
