= Hayward Regional Shoreline =

Park in California, United States of America

Coordinates: 37.64635°N 122.14726°W

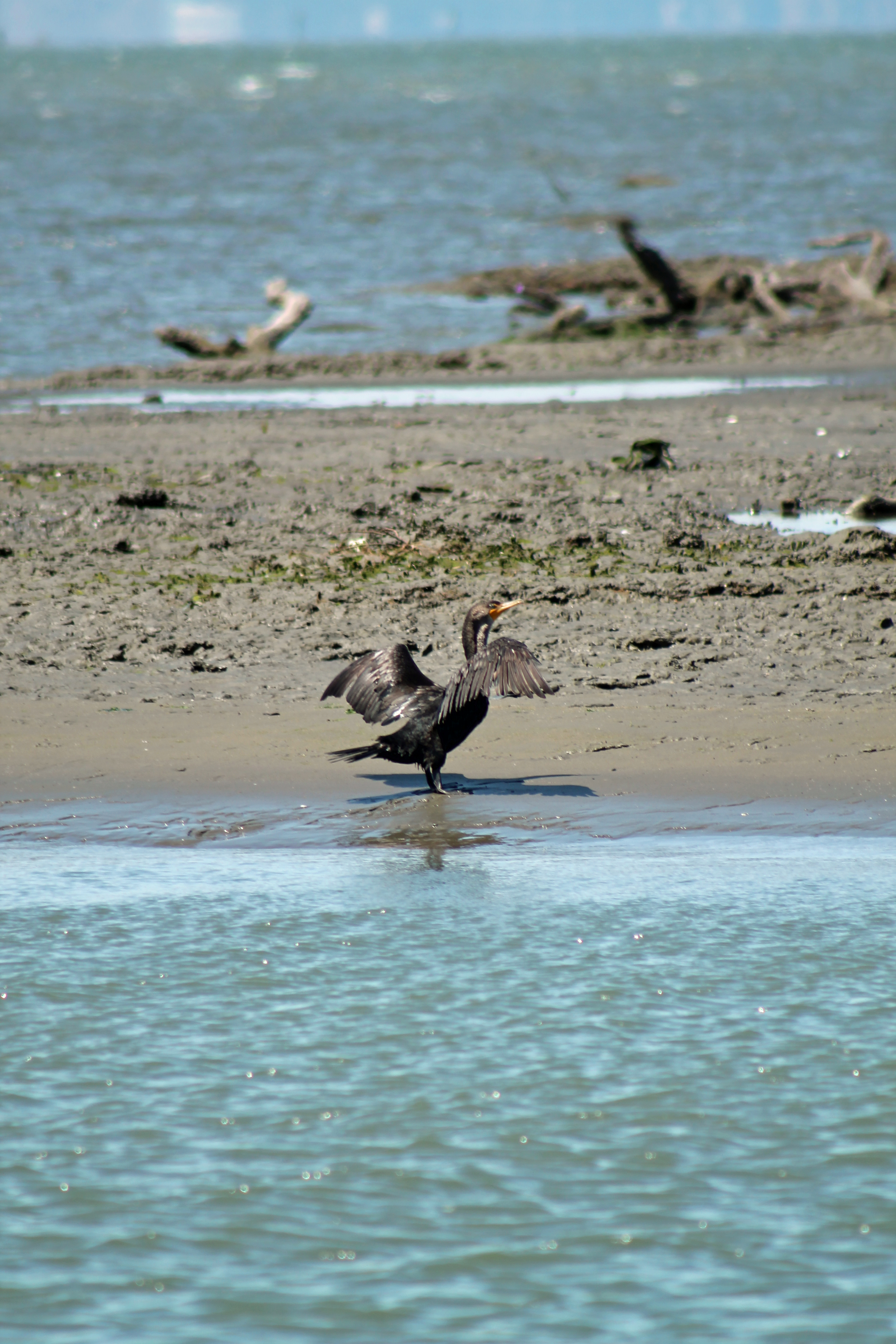
Double-crested cormorant (Phalacrocorax auritus) at Shoreline

Hayward Regional Shoreline is a regional park located on the shores of the San Francisco Bay in Hayward, California. It is part of the East Bay Regional Parks system. The 1,713-acre (693 ha) park extends to the shores of San Lorenzo. Part of the park is former commercial salt flats purchased in 1996. A former landfill, now capped with soil and plants, is located in the park. The park includes the 250-acre (100 ha) tidal wetland, Cogswell Marsh, and the 364-acre (147 ha) Oro Loma Marsh (constructed in 1997). Located to the south of the park is the Hayward Shoreline Interpretive Center, which provides information on the Bay shore habitats. The San Francisco Bay Trail runs through the park, which connects the park with San Lorenzo Creek.

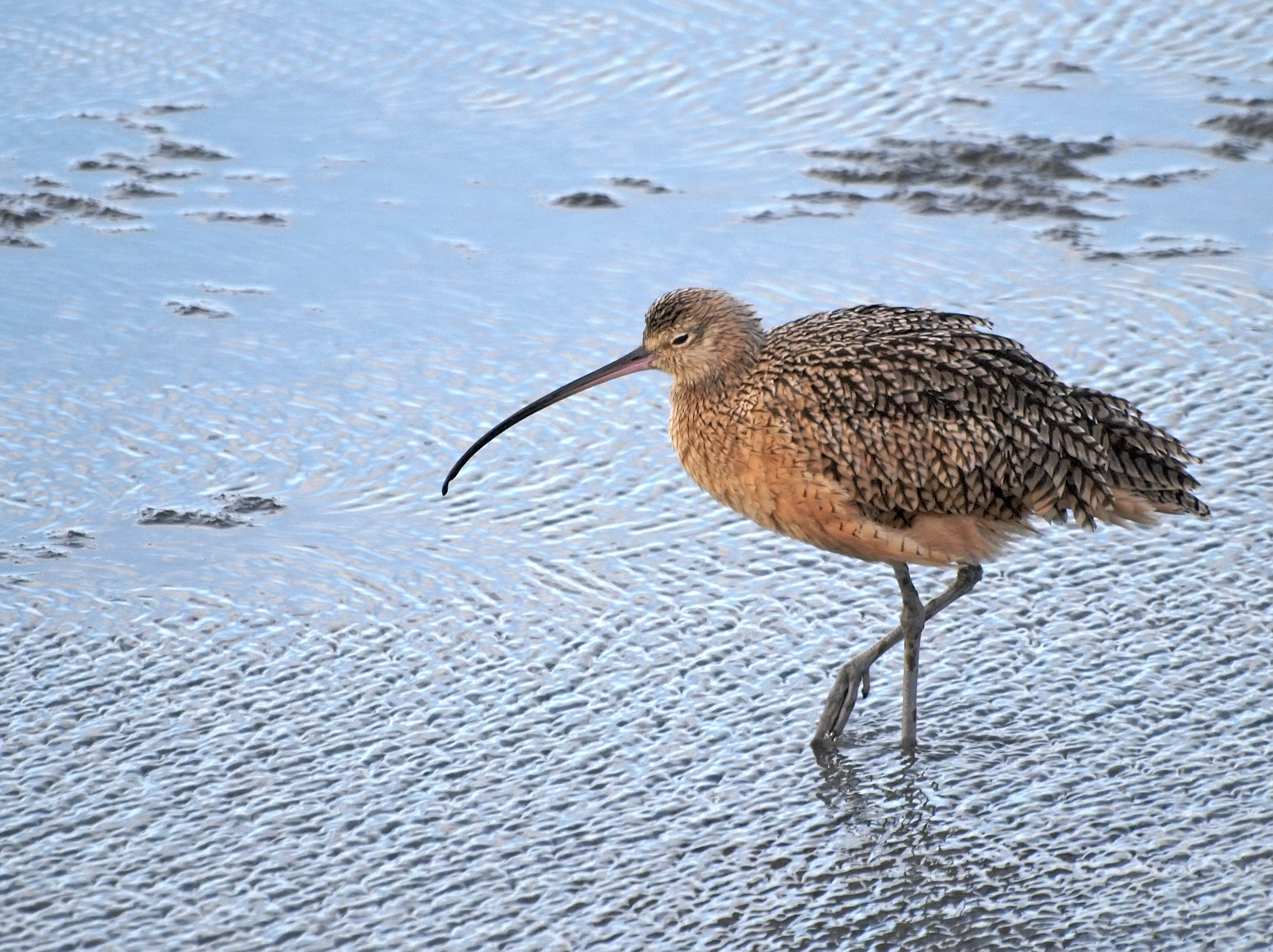
Long-billed curlew

== History ==
Hundreds of years ago, this area used to be covered in mounds of salt, which attracted gathers. Before the 1850s it was mostly the Ohlone tribes who would mine the salt crystals, and afterwards settlers discovered the area.

Josh Johnson, a Scandinavian sailor, was the first to be known to commercially harvest salt here. He had Chinese laborers construct channels to drain the marshes and levees to block off the tide. Seawater was put into the large ponds and then moved to shallower ponds to harvest salt through natural evaporation.

In 1872, the land was sold to a Swedish sailor named Andrew Oliver, and the Oliver family created many innovations to advance the salt industry, traces of which can still be seen on the trail today.

== Endangered species ==
The Hayward shoreline is home to many endangered species today. One of which is the Salt Marsh Harvest mouse (Reithrodontomys raviventris), a small mouse with bodies around 2.75-3 inches long, and live in salt marshes. They can tolerate high levels of saline in their food and water, which make places like the Hayward shoreline ideal places for them to live. The HASPA set aside 27 acres of land for a Mouse Preserve to protect the Salt Marsh Harvest Mouse. Additionally, the shoreline is also home to various species of endangered birds, including the California clapper rail and the Western snowy plover.
