= Memorial Park (Hayward, California) =

Urban park in Hayward, California

Coordinates: 37°39′43″N 122°3′12″W

Memorial Park, in Hayward, California, United States, is a public park managed by the Hayward Area Recreation and Park District. The park contains an indoor swim center, the Hayward Plunge, which opened in 1936. The park is the access point to the Greenbelt Trails, which follow Ward Creek Canyon adjacent to California State University, East Bay. The park has a small bandstand with musical events offered on major holidays. It borders on Mount Saint Joseph Cemetery (also known as All Saints or Portuguese Cemetery) which was first established in 1875. Many of the historic gravestone inscriptions are in Portuguese.

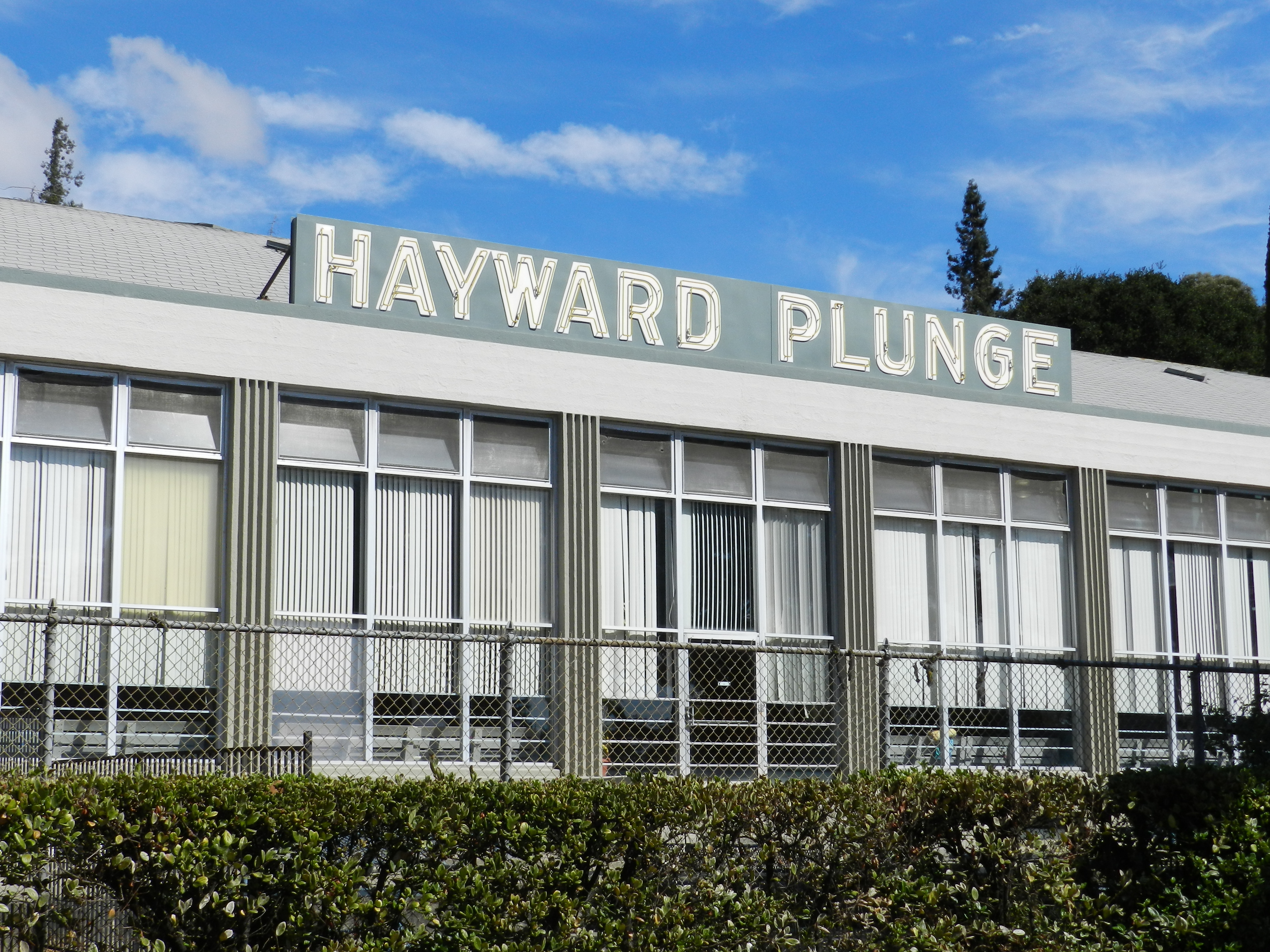
Hayward Plunge at Memorial Park

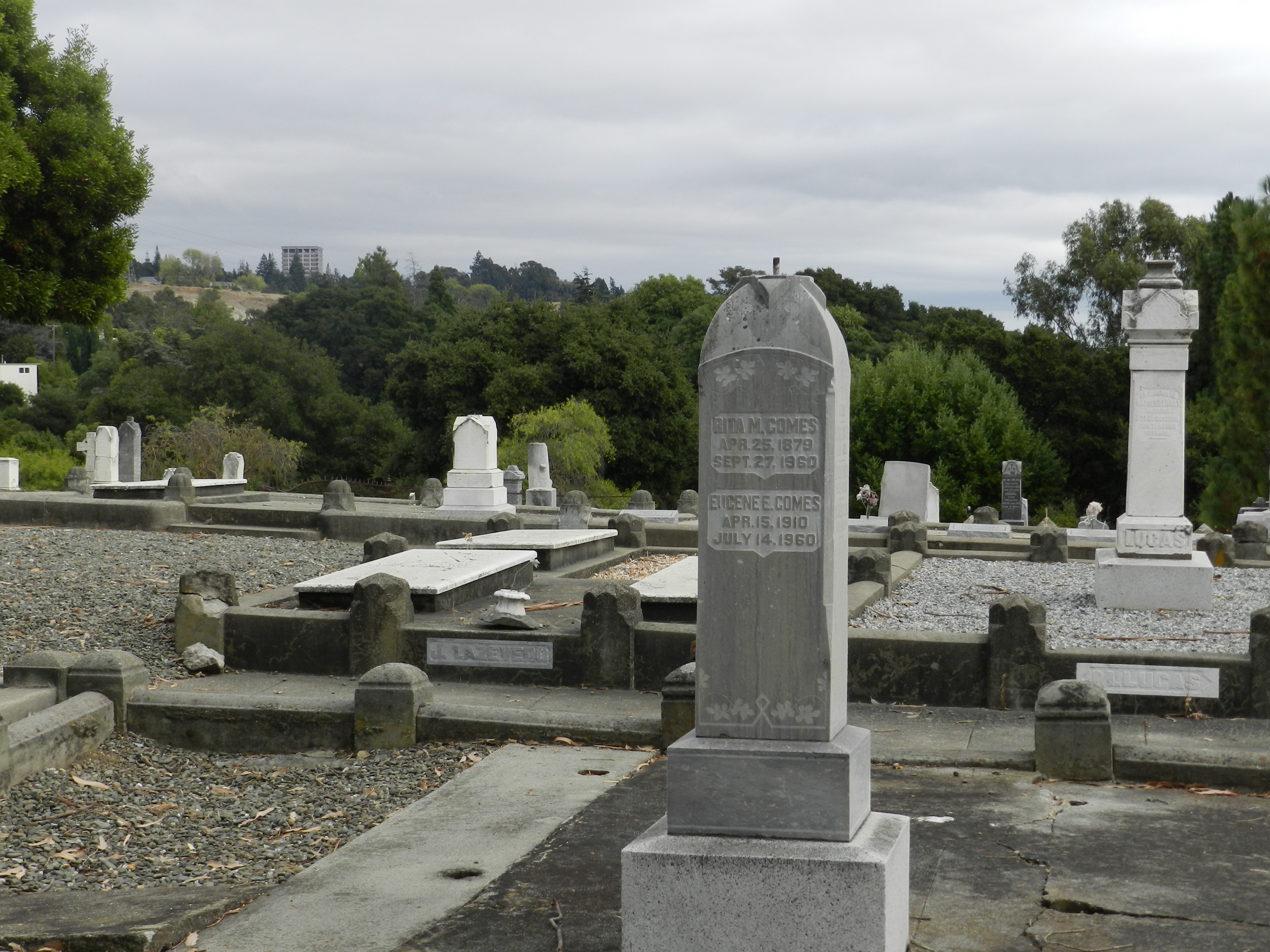
Mount Saint Joseph Cemetery
