= Kennedy Park (Hayward, California) =

Park in Hayward, California, U.S.

Coordinates: 37°40′7″N 122°7′16″W

- Interactive map of Kennedy Park
- Location: Hayward, California
- Website: https://www.haywardrec.org/facilities/facility/details/Kennedy-Park-1

Kennedy Park is a large, multi-use park in Hayward, California, managed by the Hayward Area Recreation and Park District (HARD). It is the most heavily used park in the district. The park is adjacent to McConaghy Park, which contains McConaghy House, a historic property, built in 1886, and managed as a house museum by HARD and the Hayward Area Historical Society. McConaghy House features Stick/Eastlake architecture. It lies within San Lorenzo. In 2013, plans to renovate the park and combine the park and house into a Victorian-style venue were proposed.

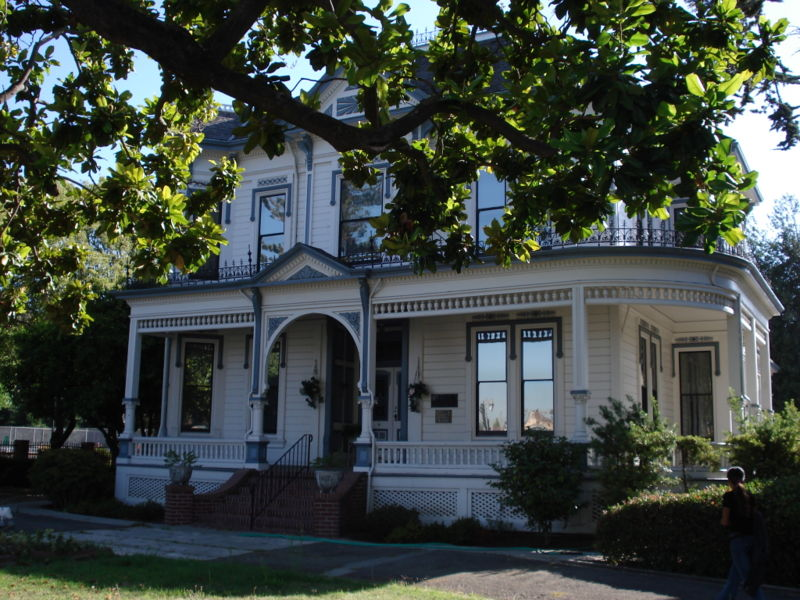
McConaghy House

== Park features ==
Kennedy Park contains a merry-go-round, a petting zoo, a pony ride, and a 2 ft (610 mm) narrow gauge railroad with a train pulled by a Chance Rides C.P. Huntington locomotive. There are also picnic and activity areas, as well as a snack bar. The park is open every day during the summer and on the weekends during the rest of the year, weather permitting.
