= Ashland, California =

Unincorporated community in California, United States

Ashland
- Unincorporated community Census Designated Place
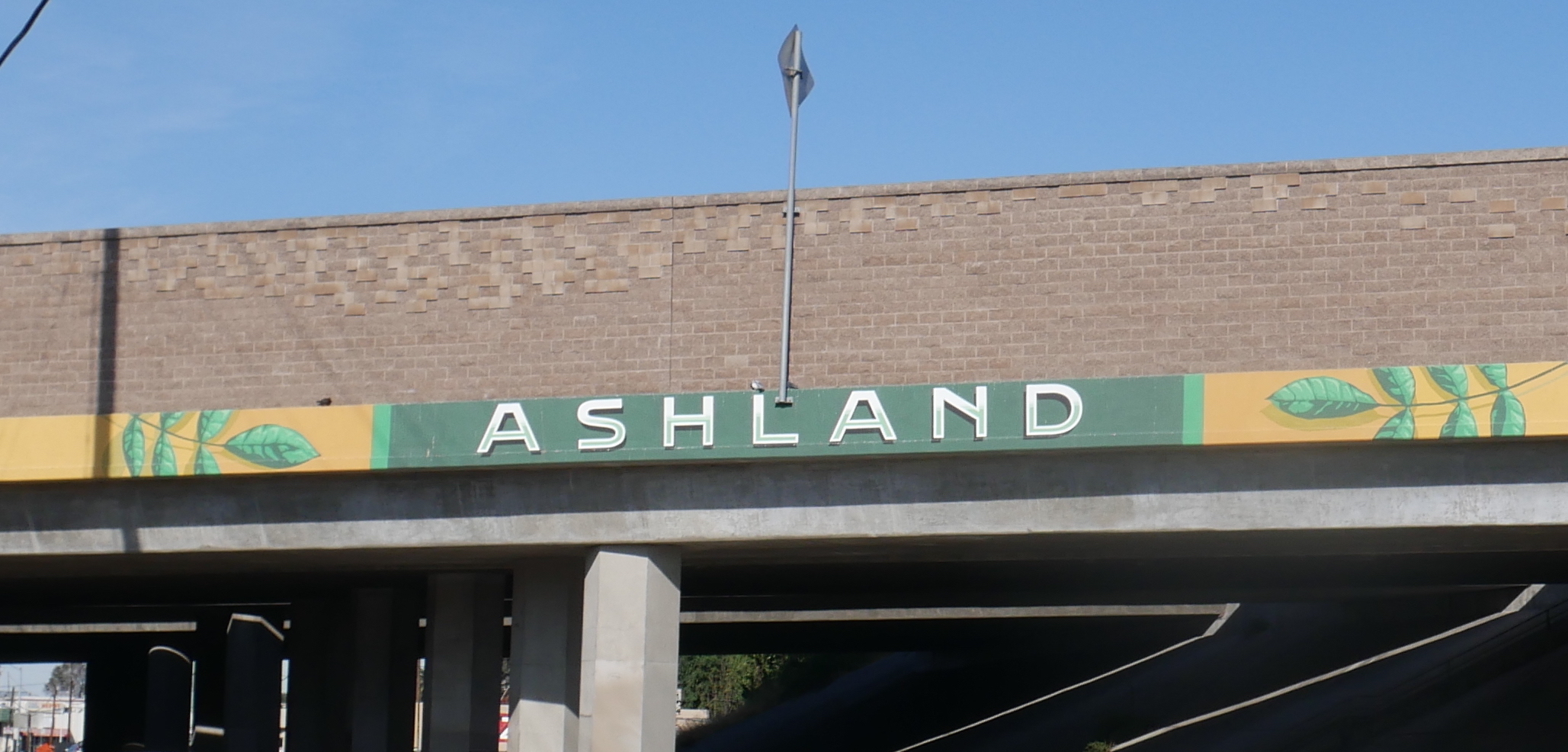
- Ashland community marker painted on I-238 overpass at Mission Blvd
- Interactive map of Ashland
- Location in the United States
- Coordinates: 37°41′41″N 122°06′50″W
- Country: United States
- State: California
- County: Alameda

Government
  - Type: Unincorporated community
  - State Senate: Vacant
  - State Assembly: Liz Ortega (D)
  - U. S. Congress: Aisha Wahab (D)
  - District 4 Alameda County Supervisor: Nate Miley

Area
  - Total: 1.84 sq mi (4.77 km^{2})
  - Land: 1.84 sq mi (4.77 km^{2})
  - Water: 0 sq mi (0.00 km^{2}) 0%
- Elevation: 43 ft (13 m)

Population (2020)
  - Total: 23,823
  - Density: 12,930/sq mi (4,992/km^{2})
- Time zone: UTC-8 (Pacific (PST))
  - Summer (DST): UTC-7 (PDT)
- ZIP code: 94541, 94578, 94580
- Area codes: 510, 341
- FIPS code: 06-02980
- GNIS feature IDs: 1657955, 2407773

Ashland is a census-designated place (CDP) and unincorporated community in Alameda County, California, United States. The population was 23,823 at the 2020 census. Ashland is located in the historic Eden Township between the city of San Leandro to the north, the unincorporated community of Cherryland to the south, the unincorporated community of Castro Valley to the east, and the unincorporated community of San Lorenzo to the southwest.

Ashland shares a ZIP code with the neighboring unincorporated community of San Lorenzo to the southwest, as well as the nearby cities of Hayward to the south and San Leandro to the north. Ashland has been informally, albeit incorrectly, known as "unincorporated San Leandro" or "unincorporated Hayward" Because Ashland does not have its own ZIP code designation.

== Geography ==
According to the United States Census Bureau, the CDP has a total area of 1.8 square miles (4.7 km^{2}), all land, and sits at an elevation of 43 feet (13 m) above sea level.

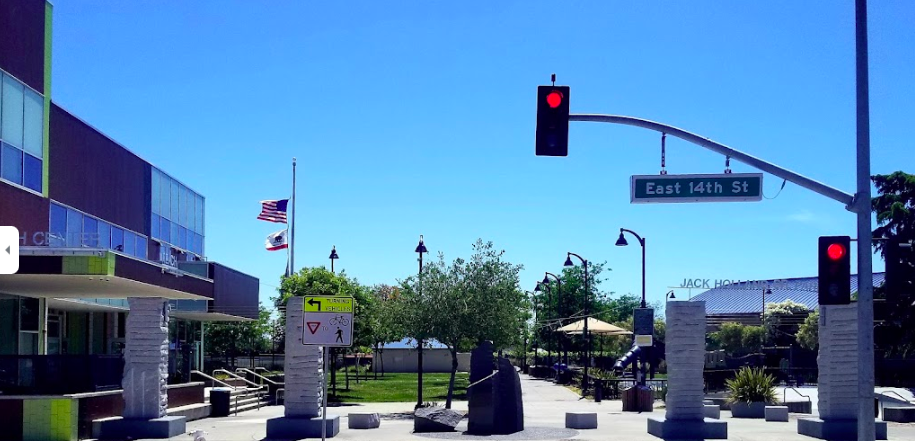
Popular skatepark and playground on a sunny day in Ashland

== History ==
Construction of the Oakland, San Leandro and Haywards Electric Railway began in 1891. By 1892, 14.3 miles (23 km) of track ran along what was then known as County Road, today's East 14th Street/Mission Boulevard between Hayward and Oakland. Electric train cars ran every half hour from 5 a.m. until midnight daily. Side feeder lines ran from Ashland Junction (near 150th St. and East 14th St.) along Telegraph, what today is known as Hesperian Boulevard, and along Ashland Avenue to Lewelling Boulevard. Over time, the value of agricultural products, for which the area was famous, declined, and the value of real estate rose. Ashland's urban/suburban character developed when farmlands and orchards were subdivided into town lots of about one acre each. New communities and subdivisions sprang up along the rail line including Ashland and Hayward's Park Homestead (between Foothill Boulevard and Mission Boulevard, bordered by Mattox Road and Grove Way).

San Lorenzo Grove, an eight-acre natural park located on today's Tracy Street, became a popular recreation destination for the region's community. The park was owned by the Oakland-San Leandro-Hayward Electric Railway and included a dance pavilion, picnic grounds, playing fields, concession area, and an outdoor bandstand. The park operated until 1917, when it was converted to apricot orchards then, into single-family residential subdivisions.

World War II brought a large number of new people to unincorporated Alameda County, and after the war, large-scale "cookie-cutter" housing subdivisions replaced most of the remaining agriculture, nurseries, and greenhouses. Ashland's primary residential development took place during the post-war period, and after the closing of the Oakland-San Leandro-Hayward Electric Railway, Ashland remains mostly car-dependent.

The Nimitz Freeway (Interstate 880), along with Interstate 238, opened in the late 1950s, thus bisecting Ashland at Mission Boulevard, continuing to Hesperian Boulevard. The creation of Interstate 238 has had the greatest effect on Ashland.

Ashland developed as a residential suburb in the 1940s.

Ashland is named after the Oregon ash tree, which grew in abundance along the San Lorenzo Creek and throughout the community.

The San Lorenzo Creek is the southern border of Ashland and boasts the oldest bay tree in the world.

== Demographics ==
Historical population
Census	Pop.	Note	%±
1970	14,810		—
1980	13,893		−6.2%
1990	16,590		19.4%
2000	20,793		25.3%
2010	21,925		5.4%
2020	23,823		8.7%
U.S. Decennial Census; 1860–1870 1880-1890; 1900 1910 1920; 1930 1940 1950; 1960 1970 1980; 1990 2000 2010; 2020

Ashland first appeared as an unincorporated community in the 1970 U.S. census; and as a census-designated place in the 1980 United States census.

=== Racial and ethnic composition ===
Ashland CDP, California – Racial and ethnic composition Note: the US Census treats Hispanic/Latino as an ethnic category. This table excludes Latinos from the racial categories and assigns them to a separate category. Hispanics/Latinos may be of any race.
Race / Ethnicity (NH = Non-Hispanic)	Pop 2000	Pop 2010	Pop 2020	% 2000	% 2010	% 2020
White alone (NH)	5,583	3,413	2,632	26.85%	15.57%	11.05%
Black or African American alone (NH)	4,067	4,085	3,840	19.56%	18.63%	16.12%
Native American or Alaska Native alone (NH)	158	95	75	0.76%	0.43%	0.31%
Asian alone (NH)	3,040	3,967	5,511	14.62%	18.09%	23.13%
Native Hawaiian or Pacific Islander alone (NH)	231	239	279	1.11%	1.09%	1.17%
Other race alone (NH)	54	55	123	0.26%	0.25%	0.52%
Mixed race or Multiracial (NH)	907	677	815	4.36%	3.09%	3.42%
Hispanic or Latino (any race)	6,753	9,394	10,548	32.48%	42.85%	44.28%
Total	20,793	21,925	23,823	100.00%	100.00%	100.00%

=== 2020 census ===
As of the 2020 census, Ashland had a population of 23,823 and a population density of 12,926.2 inhabitants per square mile (4,990.8/km^{2}). The racial makeup was 15.1% White, 16.6% African American, 1.8% Native American, 23.4% Asian, 1.3% Pacific Islander, 28.5% from other races, and 13.3% from two or more races; Hispanic or Latino people of any race were 44.3% of the population.

The median age was 34.5 years. 23.9% of residents were under the age of 18, 9.6% were aged 18 to 24, 32.0% were 25 to 44, 24.4% were 45 to 64, and 10.2% were 65 years of age or older. For every 100 females, there were 95.8 males, and for every 100 females age 18 and over there were 93.0 males.

The Census reported that 98.7% of the population lived in households, 0.7% lived in non-institutionalized group quarters, and 0.6% were institutionalized.

There were 7,701 households, of which 39.8% had children under the age of 18 living in them. Of all households, 40.4% were married-couple households, 8.7% were cohabiting couple households, 31.5% had a female householder with no partner present, and 19.4% had a male householder with no partner present. About 21.1% of households were made up of individuals, and 6.3% had someone living alone who was 65 years of age or older. The average household size was 3.05, and there were, 5,421 families (70.4% of all households).

There were 7,992 housing units at an average density of 4,336.4 units per square mile (1,674.3 units/km^{2}), of which 7,701 (96.4%) were occupied. Of these, 33.2% were owner-occupied, and 66.8% were occupied by renters. The homeowner vacancy rate was 0.9%, and the rental vacancy rate was 3.3%.

100.0% of residents lived in urban areas, while 0.0% lived in rural areas.

Racial composition as of the 2020 census
Race	Number	Percent
White	3,603	15.1%
Black or African American	3,943	16.6%
American Indian and Alaska Native	433	1.8%
Asian	5,584	23.4%
Native Hawaiian and Other Pacific Islander	301	1.3%
Some other race	6,781	28.5%
Two or more races	3,178	13.3%
Hispanic or Latino (of any race)	10,548	44.3%

=== 2023 American Community Survey ===
In 2023, the US Census Bureau estimated that 37.0% of the population were foreign-born. Of all people aged 5 or older, 43.4% spoke only English at home, 32.8% spoke Spanish, 4.3% spoke other Indo-European languages, 17.6% spoke Asian or Pacific Islander languages, and 2.0% spoke other languages. Of those aged 25 or older, 80.9% were high school graduates and 20.8% had a bachelor's degree.

The median household income was $81,604, and the per capita income was $35,603. About 13.5% of families and 16.2% of the population were below the poverty line.

== Government ==
Ashland is an unincorporated community outside the city limits of any neighboring city. Although it shares a zip code with a neighboring city, it does not receive any municipal services other than those provided by the county and is thus governed directly by the Alameda County Board of Supervisors and associated county agencies.

In 2019, the Eden Area Municipal Advisory Council was created by the Alameda County Board of Supervisors in order to advise the Board of Supervisors, the Alameda County Planning Commission and the West County Board of Zoning Adjustments, on policy and decision making for the unincorporated communities of Ashland, Cherryland, San Lorenzo and Hayward Acres.

Ashland is policed by the Alameda County Sheriff's Office, Eden Township Substation, and the California Highway Patrol.

Ashland is served by the San Lorenzo Unified School District for public school services.

Ashland is served by the Alameda County Public Works Agency for road and public infrastructure design and maintenance.

Ashland is served by the Hayward Area Recreation and Parks District for parks and recreation.

Ashland is served by the Oro Loma Sanitary District for wastewater services and the East Bay Municipal Utility District for freshwater services.
