= San Lorenzo Creek =

Creek in Hayward, California

San Lorenzo Creek Arroyo de San Salvador de Horta, Arroyo de la Harina
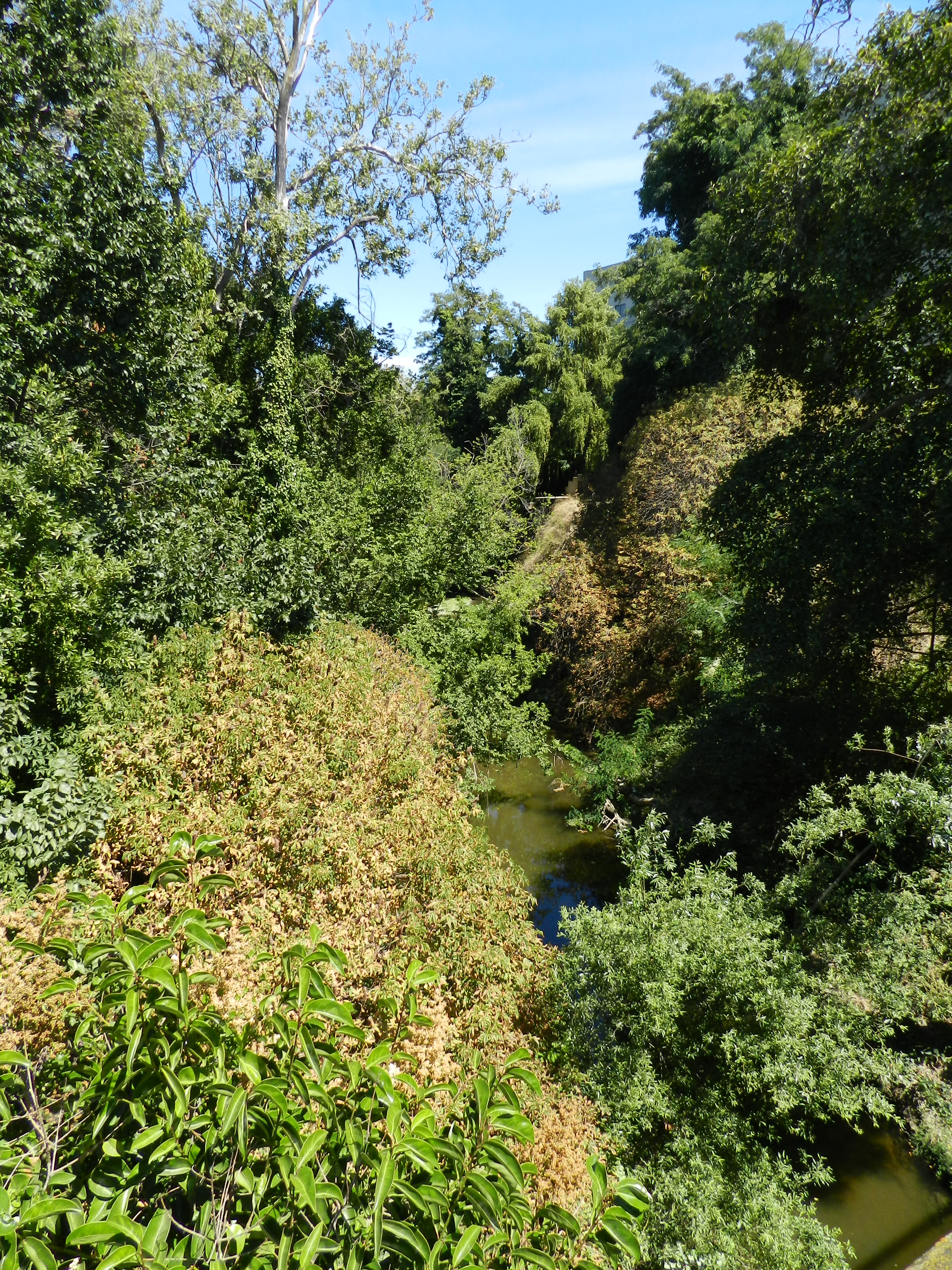
- Etymology: Spanish
- Native name: Arroyo de San Lorenzo (Spanish)

Location
- Country: United States
- State: California
- Region: Alameda County
- City: Hayward, California

Physical characteristics
- Source
  - location: east of Hayward, California
- Source confluence: confluence
  - location: at Palomares Creek and Eden Canyon Creek
  - coordinates: 37°41′45″N 122°01′33″W
- Mouth: San Francisco Bay
  - location: Hayward Regional Shoreline
  - coordinates: 37°40′13″N 122°09′46″W
  - elevation: 0 ft (0 m)

Basin features
- Tributaries
  - left: Crow Creek, Castro Valley Creek
  - right: Sulphur Creek (diversion)

San Lorenzo Creek (Spanish: Arroyo de San Lorenzo) is a 10.7-mile-long (17.2 km) year-round natural stream flowing through Hayward, California and other neighboring unincorporated communities into San Francisco Bay at the Hayward Regional Shoreline.

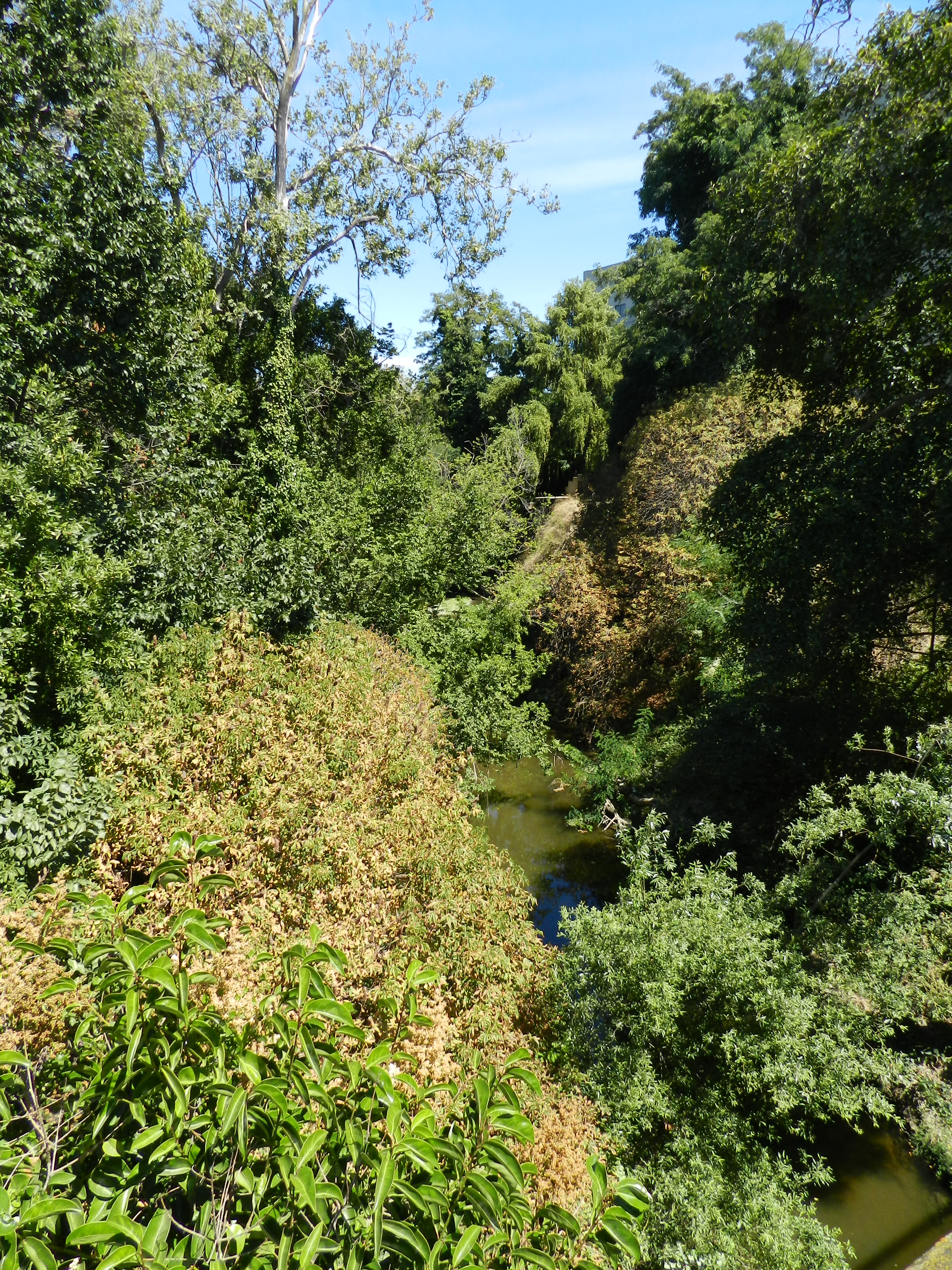
Creek and foliage, downtown Hayward

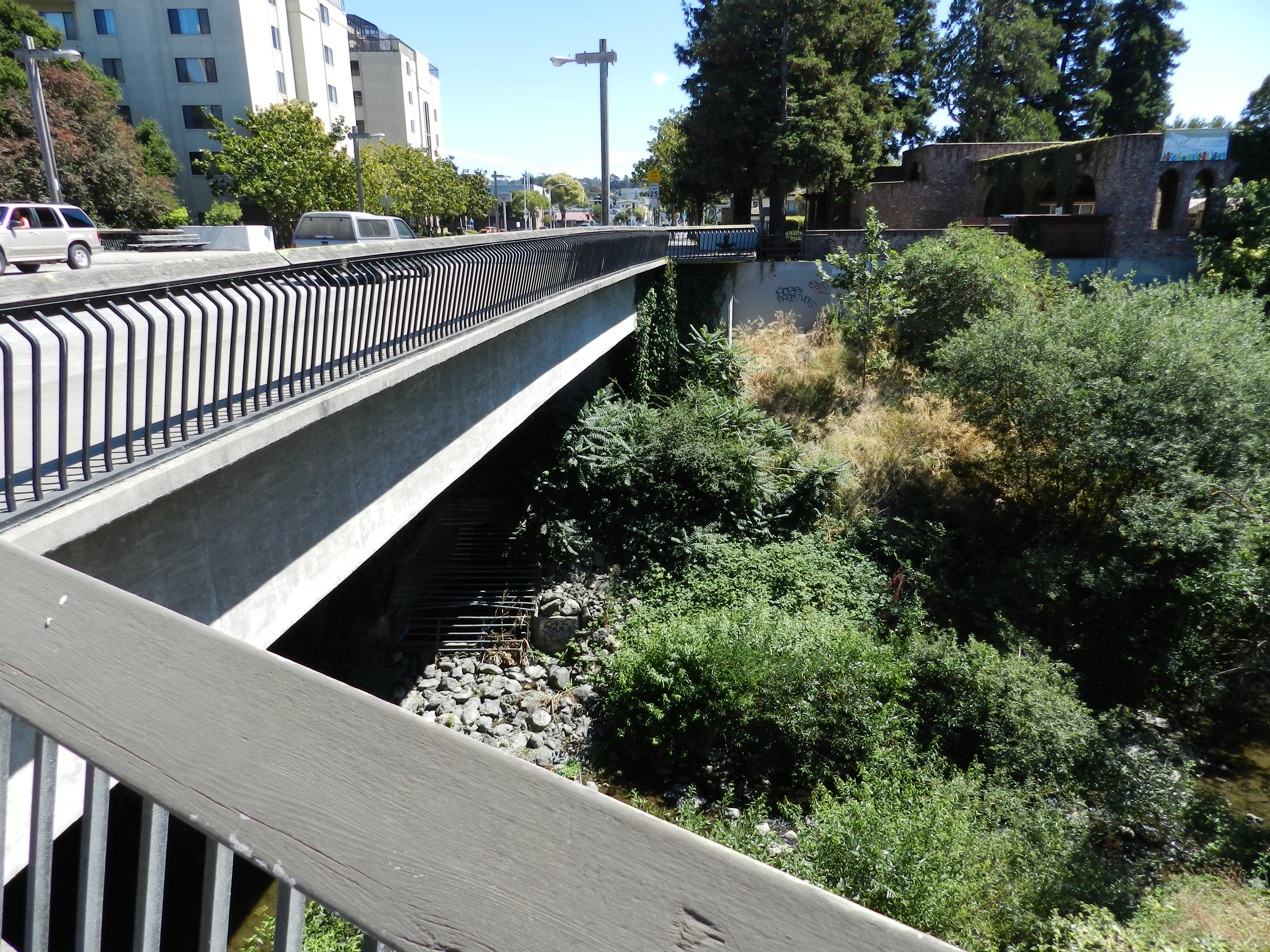
View from bridge, downtown Hayward

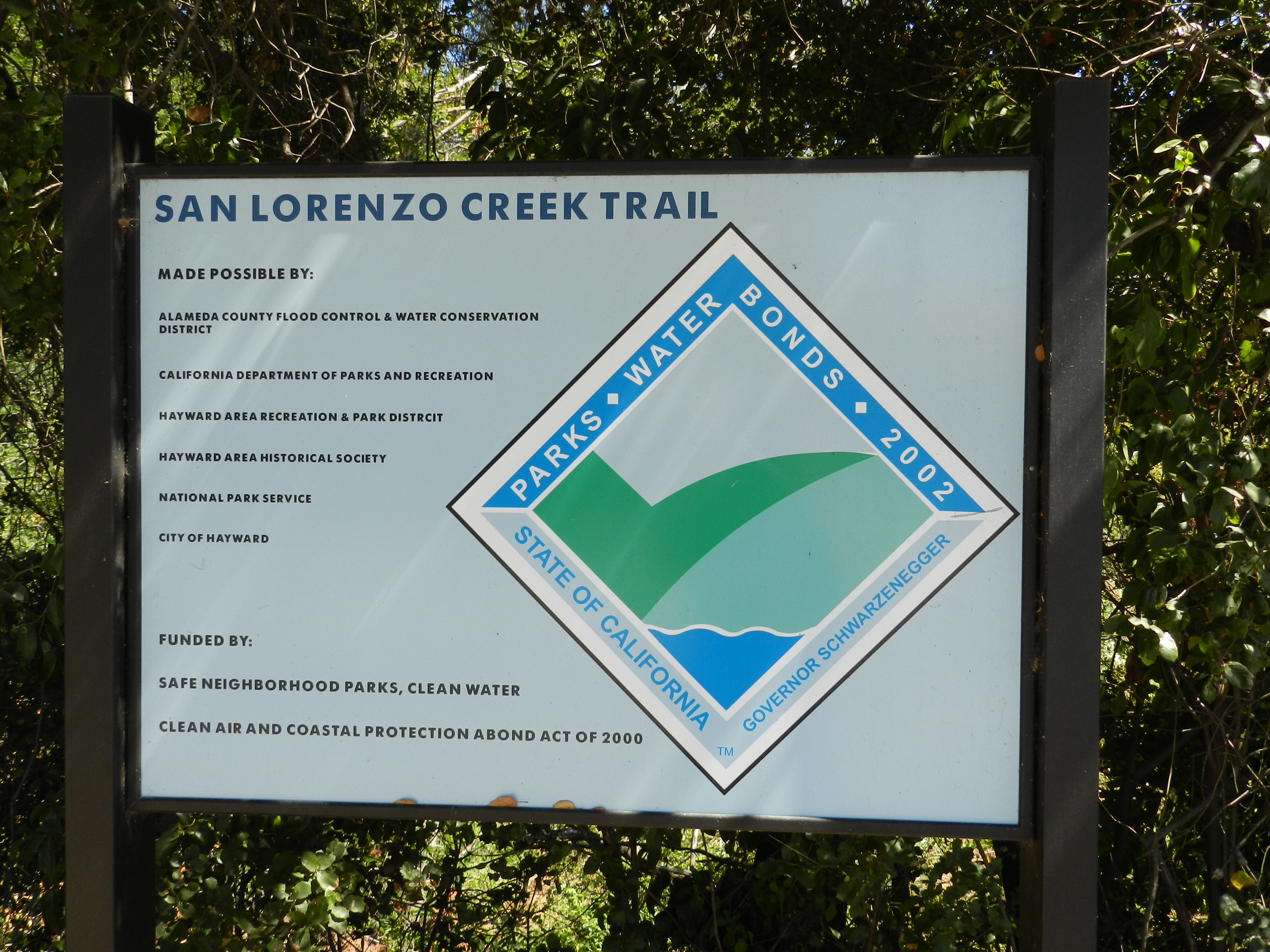
San Lorenzo Creek Trail entrance

== Watershed ==
The creek begins in Castro Valley, and is the main tributary within the San Lorenzo Watershed, including the formerly independent Sulphur Creek, which had most of its flow diverted into San Lorenzo Creek in the 1960s to reduce the risk of flooding in downtown Hayward. Only in large flow events does some of the creek flow follow its old course into the Bay. The creek runs through the City of Hayward and the unincorporated communities of Cherryland, Ashland and San Lorenzo and empties into San Francisco Bay. A portion of the San Francisco Bay Trail runs along the mouth of the creek. The Cull Canyon and Don Castro reservoirs, both located within regional parks, feed into the creek.

== History ==
The creek marks the farthest northward point of exploration by the Portolá expedition of 1769–70. Scouts camped at the creek before turning back to join the main party on the west side of the bay. Further explorations, led by Monterey presidio commander Pedro Fages in 1770 and 1772, also used the camp before continuing to the north.

From records dating to 1772, the creek was previously known to Spanish colonists as Arroyo de San Salvador de Horta, and Arroyo de la Harina. The current name for the creek, Arroyo de San Lorenzo, dates to at least 1812, and was recorded as such in land grants from 1841 and 1842.

El Camino Viejo now Mission Boulevard, passed through what is now San Lorenzo, California, crossing San Lorenzo Creek where Mission Boulevard crosses it now.

== Ecology ==
San Lorenzo Creek historically supported steelhead (the anadromous form of the coastal rainbow trout Oncorhynchus mykiss irideus), and other salmonids. A 1997 paper states that, due to reasons tied to the ever increasing urbanization, dams, and their effect on the area, no sign of juvenile nor mature steelhead could be found in the creek. Since steelhead in the Bay Area and California's Central Coast were listed as threatened under the Endangered Species Act in 1997, numerous organizations, and governmental agencies have cooperated on restoration projects to allow migratory fish from the Bay to reach spawning habitat in various Bay Area watersheds.

== See also ==
- List of watercourses in the San Francisco Bay Area
- Urban stream, which describes some sections of San Lorenzo Creek
