= Las Positas College =

Community college in Livermore, California, US

Coordinates: 37.7117°N 121.8007°W

- Type: Public community college
- Established: 1964
- President: Dyrell Foster
- Students: 11,293
- Location: Livermore, California, United States
- Campus: Urban
- Colors: Red and black
- Mascot: Hawks
- Website: www.laspositascollege.edu

Las Positas College (LPC) is a public community college in Livermore, California.

== History ==
Las Positas College began as an extension program of Chabot College in 1963, offering 24 classes and enrolling 810 students at three sites, including Livermore High School. By 1965, the program had expanded to Granada High School in Livermore and subsequently offered classes at Amador and Dublin High Schools as well. The Chabot-Las Positas Community College District purchased the Livermore site that same year, intending to develop a comprehensive community college. However, in 1970 and again in 1972, bond issues to build the rural college failed despite Tri-Valley voters' overwhelming support, ostensibly because of opposition among the district's largest voting population, who lived outside the service area for the proposed college. Lacking funds to develop a second comprehensive community college, the board of trustees voted to develop a small education center at the Livermore site. On March 31, 1975, "Valley Campus" opened as the Livermore Education Center of Chabot College.

Las Positas College has since developed into a fully accredited comprehensive institution. In 1988, LPC was designated by the board of governors to be an independent college. It received full accreditation on January 7, 1991, from the Accrediting Commission for Community and Junior Colleges of the Western Association of Schools and Colleges. In December 2013, the Chabot-Las Positas Community College District trustees appointed Barry A. Russell as the sixth president of the college. Russell worked in the office of the chancellor at California Community Colleges at the time of his appointment to president. As of November 2023, the president was Dyrell Foster.

== Academics ==
Las Positas College enrolls approximately 10,000-day and evening students. It offers a two-year curriculum for students seeking career preparation, transfer to a four-year college or university, or personal enrichment. LPC offers a guaranteed transfer agreement with all University of California schools except UC Berkeley and UCLA. Students who come to the LPC can choose any of 22 occupational associate degrees, 16 transfer associate degrees, and 42 certificate programs.

== Athletics ==
The school's Ultimate Frisbee team won the College D-III national championship in 2006.

In the 2015 fall semester, LPC began its first season of intercollegiate Men's and Women's Water Polo.

== See also ==
- Rancho Las Positas, the namesake and 19th century rancho in Livermore Valley
