= St. Raymond's Church =

St. Raymond's Church may refer to:

- Old St. Raymond's Church Dublin, California, listed on the NRHP in California
- Cathedral of St. Raymond Nonnatus Joliet, Illinois
- St. Raymond's Church (Bronx, New York)
