= KCRH =

Radio station at Chabot College in Hayward, California

- Hayward, California; United States
- Broadcast area: San Francisco Bay Area
- Frequency: 89.9 MHz
- Branding: KCRH 89.9FM

Programming
- Format: Variety

Ownership
- Owner: Chabot College; (Chabot-Las Positas Community College District)

History
- First air date: 1981
- Call sign meaning: "Chabot Radio Hayward"

Technical information
- Licensing authority: FCC
- Facility ID: 61061
- Class: D
- ERP: 18 watts
- HAAT: −41 meters (−135 ft)
- Transmitter coordinates: 37°38′22.7″N 122°6′19.8″W

Links
- Public license information: Public file; LMS
- Website: www.kcrhradio.com

KCRH (89.9 FM) is a student-run college radio station licensed to and owned by Chabot College in Hayward, California. KCRH, which broadcasts a Variety format, serves the San Francisco Bay Area. The station is operated by students in the college's Mass Communications department.

== Overview ==
KCRH broadcasts a wide variety of music geared towards the college audience and broadcasts Chabot College's sports games. The station recently relocated from an older room in the former humanities building (Building 900), where the station had been headquartered since it started in 1981, to a new location in the college's main office building (Building 100) in the center of campus as of the fall semester 2007. The call letters were previously used by a defunct radio station in Nampa, Idaho.

== Reach ==
KCRH's signal can be heard throughout Hayward and can be heard as far north to East Oakland, far east to Dublin and far south to Union City.

== Broadcast record ==
Former personality Manuel Diaz, Jr. was once on-air for 38 straight hours (June 12–14, 2004), a record that still remains as the longest on-air shift in station history.

== See also ==
- Campus radio
- List of college radio stations in the United States
