= Tri-Valley =

- Area of the East Bay
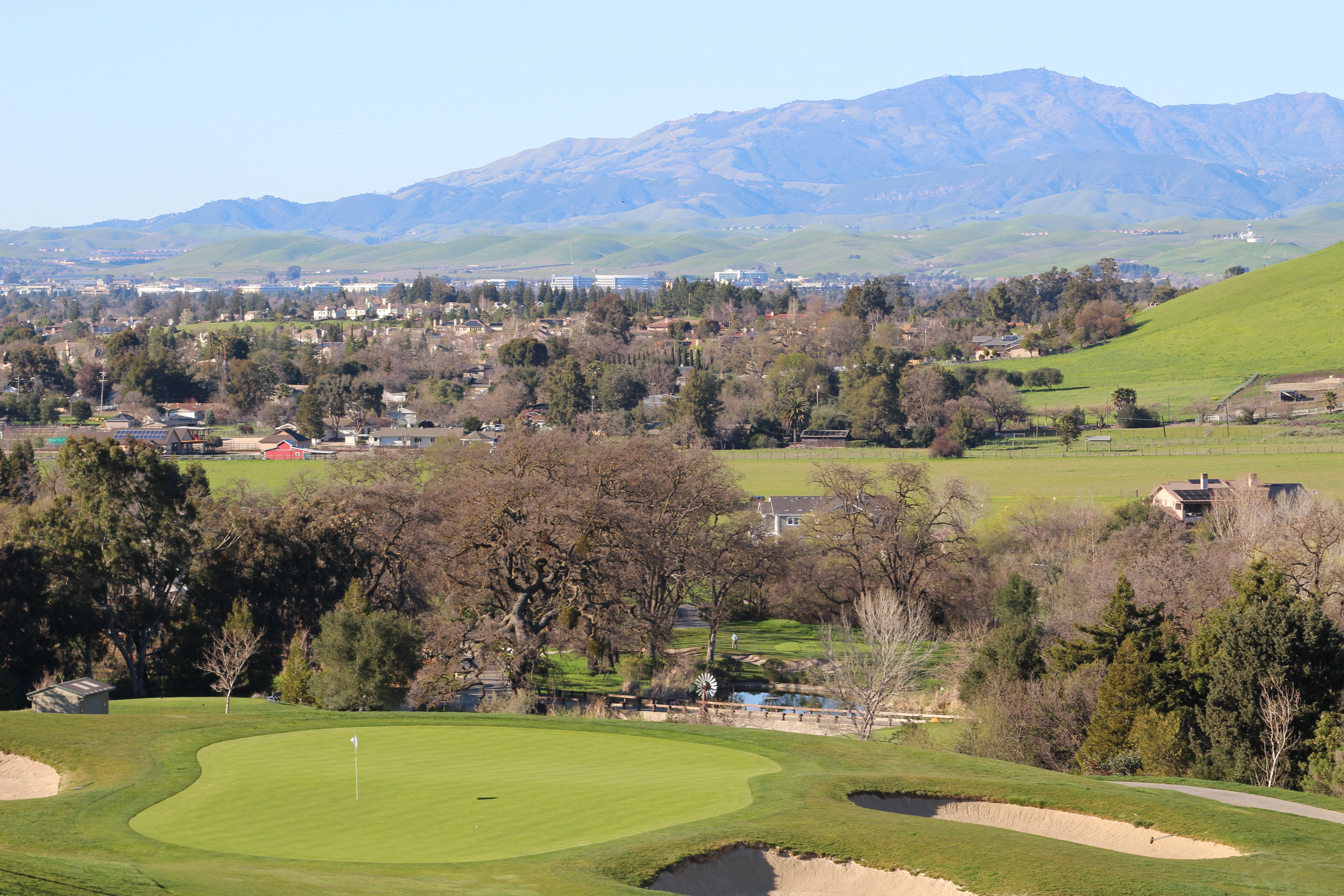
- Tri-Valley Landscape

- Tri-Valley location in California

- Location in the United States
- Coordinates: 37°39′45″N 121°52′29″W

Population
  - Total: 401,072
- Time zone: UTC-8 (Pacific Time Zone)
  - Summer (DST): UTC-7 (PDT)

The Tri-Valley area is a grouping of three valleys in the East Bay region of California's Bay Area. The three valleys are the Amador Valley, the Livermore Valley, and the San Ramon Valley. The Tri-Valley encompasses the cities of Dublin, Livermore, Pleasanton and San Ramon, the town of Danville, and the CDPs of Alamo, Blackhawk, Camino Tassajara, Diablo, and Norris Canyon. The area is known for its Mediterranean climate, wineries, and nature. It is primarily suburban in character. The total population of the Tri-Valley was 401,072 at the 2020 U.S. Census. It offers more affordable living accommodations than the cities of San Francisco and San Jose.

== History ==
The Ohlone tribe settled the area circa 2000 BC, particularly in the northern part of Pleasanton. In 1772, however, Spanish colonists involved with the nearby mission work at Mission San José disrupted the Ohlone way of life.

The area began to be developed when the Gold Rush ended. During this period, the area went from being marshland to agricultural.

== Climate ==
The climate of the Tri-Valley is mild. Most rain falls in the winter. Snow almost never occurs, although it sometimes falls on the tops of surrounding mountains, especially Mt. Diablo. Summer days are in the 80s to over 100 °F, but nights are often cool. In winter, daytime temperatures reach the 50s and 60s, while nights are in the 30s and 40s, dipping on rare occasions into the 20s. Mean annual rainfall ranges from about 14 in (360 mm) in Livermore to 23 in (580 mm) in Alamo.

== Transportation ==
The Tri-Valley is serviced by Contra Costa County Connect and WHEELS, operated by the Livermore Amador Valley Transit Authority (LAVTA), a bus agency that operates local bus service throughout Livermore, Pleasanton and Dublin, including service to Hacienda Business Park, Lawrence Livermore National Laboratory, Las Positas College, Stoneridge Mall, the West Dublin/Pleasanton BART Station and the Dublin/Pleasanton BART station.

Two major highways, Interstates 580 and 680 cross the Tri-Valley area. Interstate 580 runs east-west, connecting the area to the Central Valley to the east and Marin County to the west. Interstate 680 runs north-south, connecting the area to San Jose in the south, and the Concord-Walnut Creek area in the north. The two interstates cross on the border of Dublin and Pleasanton.

The Tri-Valley area is also serviced by BART, offering service to the rest of the San Francisco Bay Area via two stops: West Dublin/Pleasanton and the Dublin/Pleasanton terminus station. The West Dublin/Pleasanton Station opened in 2011, and was the first infill station on an existing line. In 2018, BART cancelled plans to extend the line to Livermore. However, the Tri-Valley–San Joaquin Valley Regional Rail Authority is in the planning process for a rail connection between BART, ACE, and the San Joaquin Valley called the Valley Link.

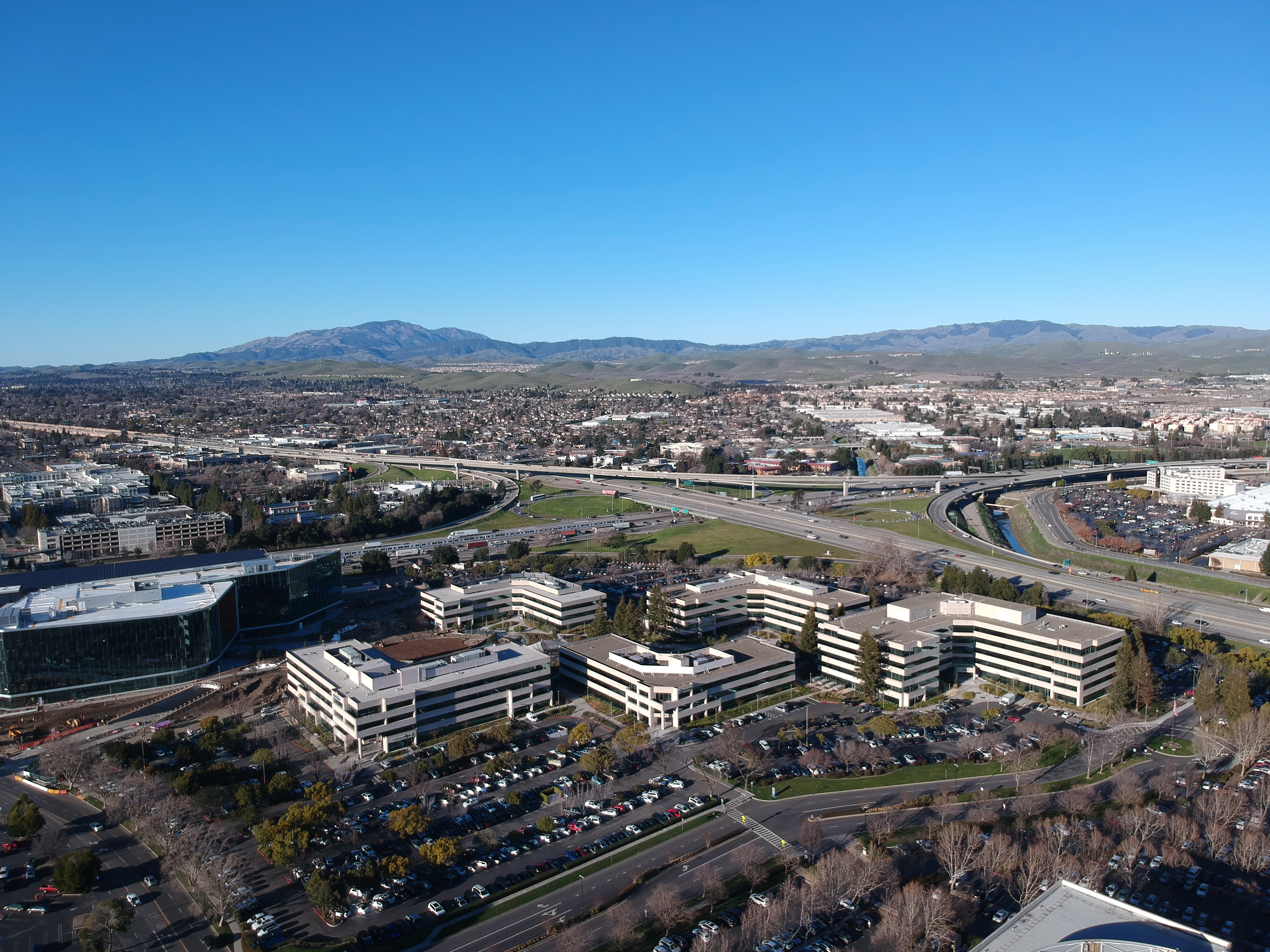
Corporate office buildings at the intersection of I-580 and I-680

== Economy ==
The Tri-Valley is home to the corporate headquarters of many companies, including 10X Genomics, 24 Hour Fitness, Architectural Glass and Aluminum, Bay Area News Group, Blackhawk Network Holdings, CallidusCloud, The Cooper Companies, Discovery Toys, Ellie Mae, GE Digital, Gillig Corporation, Patelco Credit Union, Prosoft Engineering, Ross Stores, SafeAmerica Credit Union, Safeway, Shaklee, TriNet, Veeva Systems, Visioneer, WANdisco, The Wine Group, Product10x Accelerator, Salestable and Workday.

Major employment centers include Bishop Ranch and Hacienda Business Park.

Lawrence Livermore National Laboratory and Sandia National Laboratories are also major employers in the region.

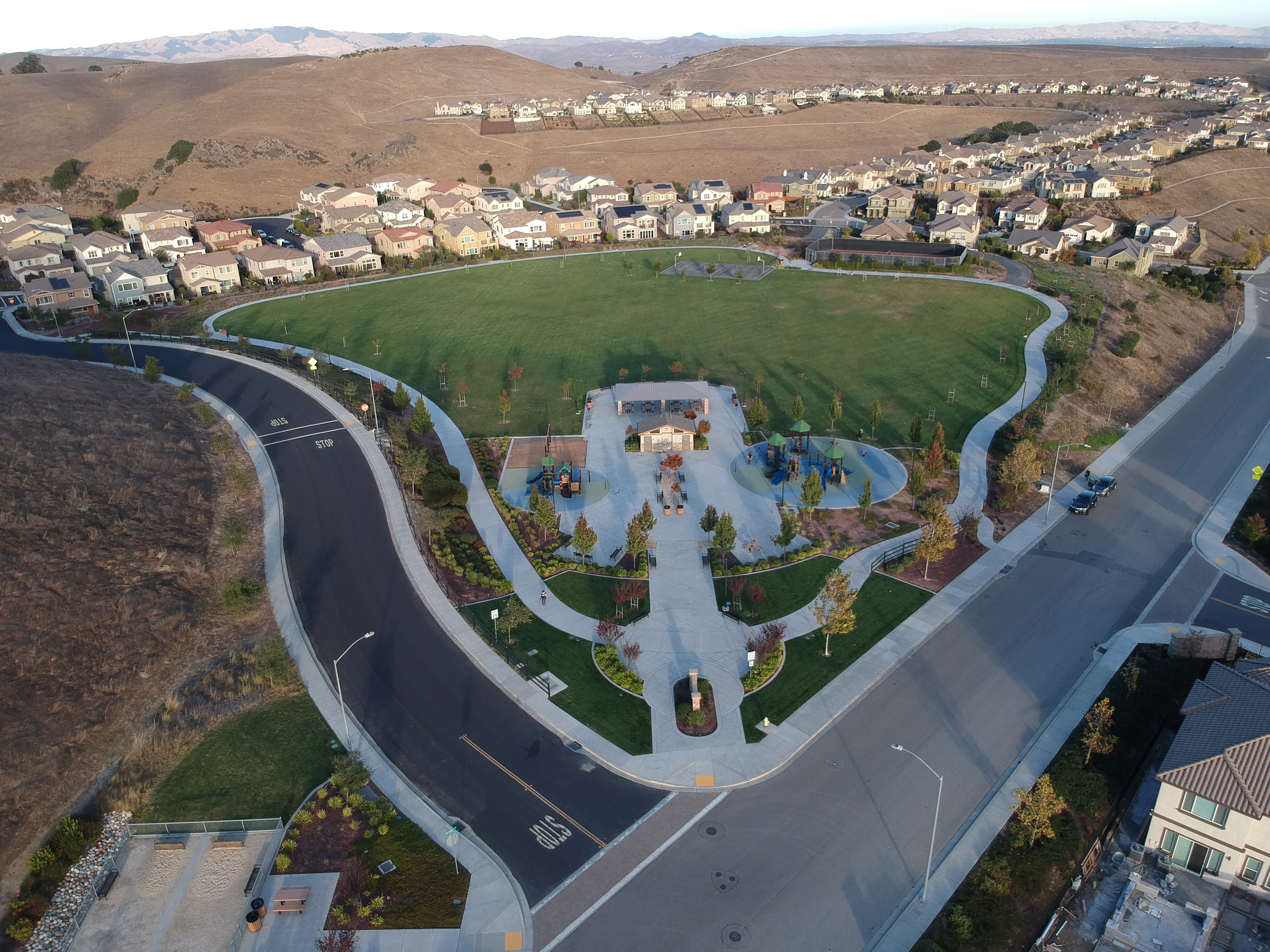
Aerial view of Schaefer Ranch Park in Dublin, CA

== Recreation ==
The Tri-Valley features access to many recreational options, including Alviso Adobe Community Park, Blackhawk Museum, Brushy Peak Regional Preserve, Del Valle Regional Park, Dublin Hills Regional Park, Eugene O'Neill National Historic Site, Forest Home Farms, Iron Horse Regional Trail, Las Trampas Regional Wilderness, Little Hills Picnic Ranch, Livermore Valley Wine Country, Morgan Territory Regional Preserve, Mount Diablo State Park, Pleasanton Ridge Regional Park, Shadow Cliffs Regional Recreation Area and The Wave Waterpark.

== See also ==
- East Bay (San Francisco Bay Area)
- Tri-Valley Community Television
- Livermore Valley AVA
