= Dublin Unified School District =

School district in California, United States

Coordinates: 37°43′0.08″N 121°55′49.89″W

Address
- 7471 Larkdale Avenue Dublin, California, 94568; United States

District information
- Type: Public
- Grades: K–12
- NCES District ID: 0600019

Students and staff
- Students: 12,625
- Teachers: 549.91
- Staff: 429.56
- Student–teacher ratio: 22.96

Other information
- Website: www.dublinusd.org

The Dublin Unified School District (DUSD) serves over 12,900 students, from preschool through adult education, in a diverse suburban environment. The district operates seven elementary schools, two middle schools, one K-8 school, one continuation high school, and one comprehensive high school. Dublin is a suburban city in the East (San Francisco) Bay Area and Tri-Valley regions of Alameda County, California. The city, with a population of approximately 65,716, is located along the north side of the Interstate 580/680 intersection. As of 2018, the graduation rate was 98%.

== Board of trustees ==
- Kristin Speck (Trustee Area 2), President
- Dan Cherrier (trustee Area 3)
- Kristian Reyes (Trustee Area 1)
- Carolina Martinez (Trustee Area 3) Vice President
- Gabi Blackman (Trustee Area 4)

== Superintendent and cabinet ==
- Chris Funk, Superintendent
- Matt Campbell, Assistant Superintendent, Educational Services
- Heather Campos, Assistant Superintendent, Human Resources
- Chris Hobbs, Assistant Superintendent, Business Services

Dublin Partners in Education (DPIE) is the non-profit educational foundation for the Dublin Unified School District and was founded in 1992.

== Dublin schools ==
Dublin has opened 7 new schools in the 21st century. A second comprehensive high school opened to freshmen in the 2023–2024 school year and in August 2024 moved to its own campus, initially restricted to freshmen and sophomores. The name Emerald High School was unanimously chosen as its name by the DUSD Board on August 18, 2020.

=== High schools ===
- Dublin High School
- Emerald High School

=== Middle schools ===
- Eleanor Murray Fallon Middle School
- School of Wells Middle

=== TK-8 schools ===
- Cottonwood Creek School
- Shamrock Hills School (future school)

=== Elementary schools ===
- Amador Elementary School
- James Dougherty Elementary School
- Dublin Elementary School
- Frederiksen Elementary School
- John Green Elementary School
- Harold William Kolb Elementary School
- Murray Elementary School

=== Adult School ===
- Dublin Adult Education

=== Closed Schools ===
DUSD continues to own the buildings for both closed campuses and rents the spaces to private schools and community organizations.

- Neilsen Elementary School (Closed 2013)
- Valley High School (Closed 2026; as of the 2018–2019 school year, it had a staff of 8 teachers for 72 students in grades 10–12.)
