= Bishop Ranch =

Business park in San Ramon, California, USA

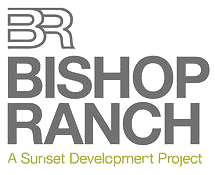
- Interactive map of Bishop Ranch
- Location: San Ramon, California, United States
- Coordinates: 37.7684433°N 121.9702906°W
- Opening date: 1978; 48 years ago
- Developer: Sunset Development Company
- No. of tenants: 550
- No. of workers: 30,000
- Website: www.bishopranch.com

Bishop Ranch is a large business park in San Ramon, California. Tenants include AT&T, Chevron, Bank of the West, PG&E, Robert Half International, Ford Motor Company, SAP, General Electric, JPMorgan Chase, and the Pac-12 Conference. Over 30,000 employees work in Bishop Ranch.

At 1.8 million square feet, the park's anchor building, 2600 Bishop Ranch, is the second-largest office building in the Bay Area, after Apple Park (2.8 million square feet).

== History ==
Bishop Ranch and the East Bay Regional Park District's Bishop Ranch Regional Preserve were originally part of a 3,000-acre parcel (1,200 ha) called Norris Ranch. Western Electric acquired Bishop Ranch in 1955 to house a manufacturing plant. Sunset Development Company purchased the 585-acre parcel from Western Electric in 1978. In 2022, Chevron moved its global headquarters to Bishop Ranch.

In November 2018, Sunset Development Company unveiled City Center Bishop Ranch. City Center is a shopping, dining and entertainment destination for the community of San Ramon, as well as the greater Tri-Valley.

2600 Bishop Ranch originally opened in 1983 as Pacific Bell's new headquarters after that company departed its original hometown of San Francisco. After various acquisitions, Pacific Bell evolved by 2005 into AT&T California, a subsidiary of AT&T. Over the next few years, AT&T's management quietly transferred to Texas many jobs which did not need to be physically performed in California, meaning that AT&T California no longer needed such a large building in San Ramon. In 2013, AT&T sold off 2600 Bishop Ranch in a deal in which it agreed to lease back only the space it actually needed.

== Origins ==
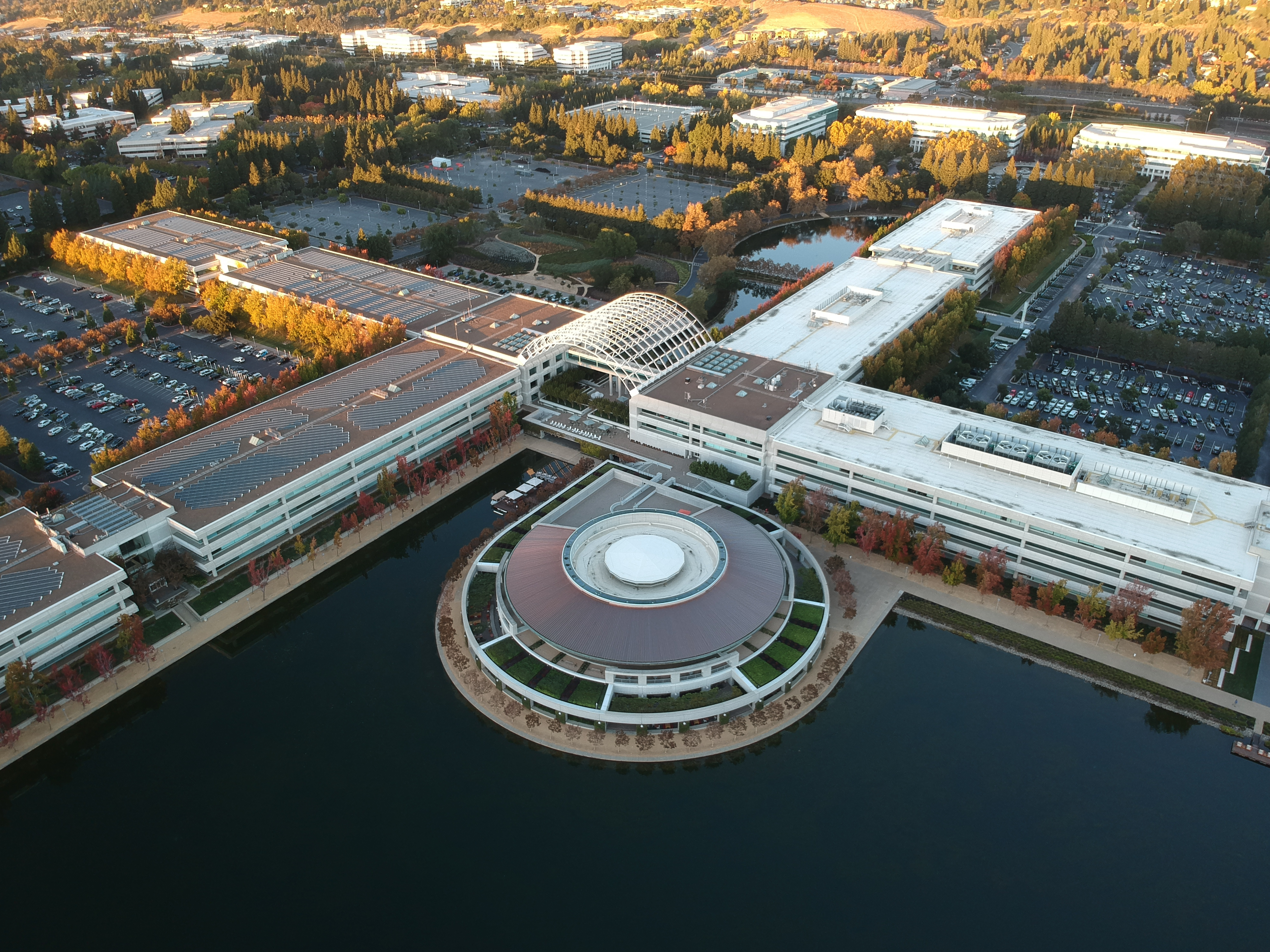
2600 Bishop Ranch

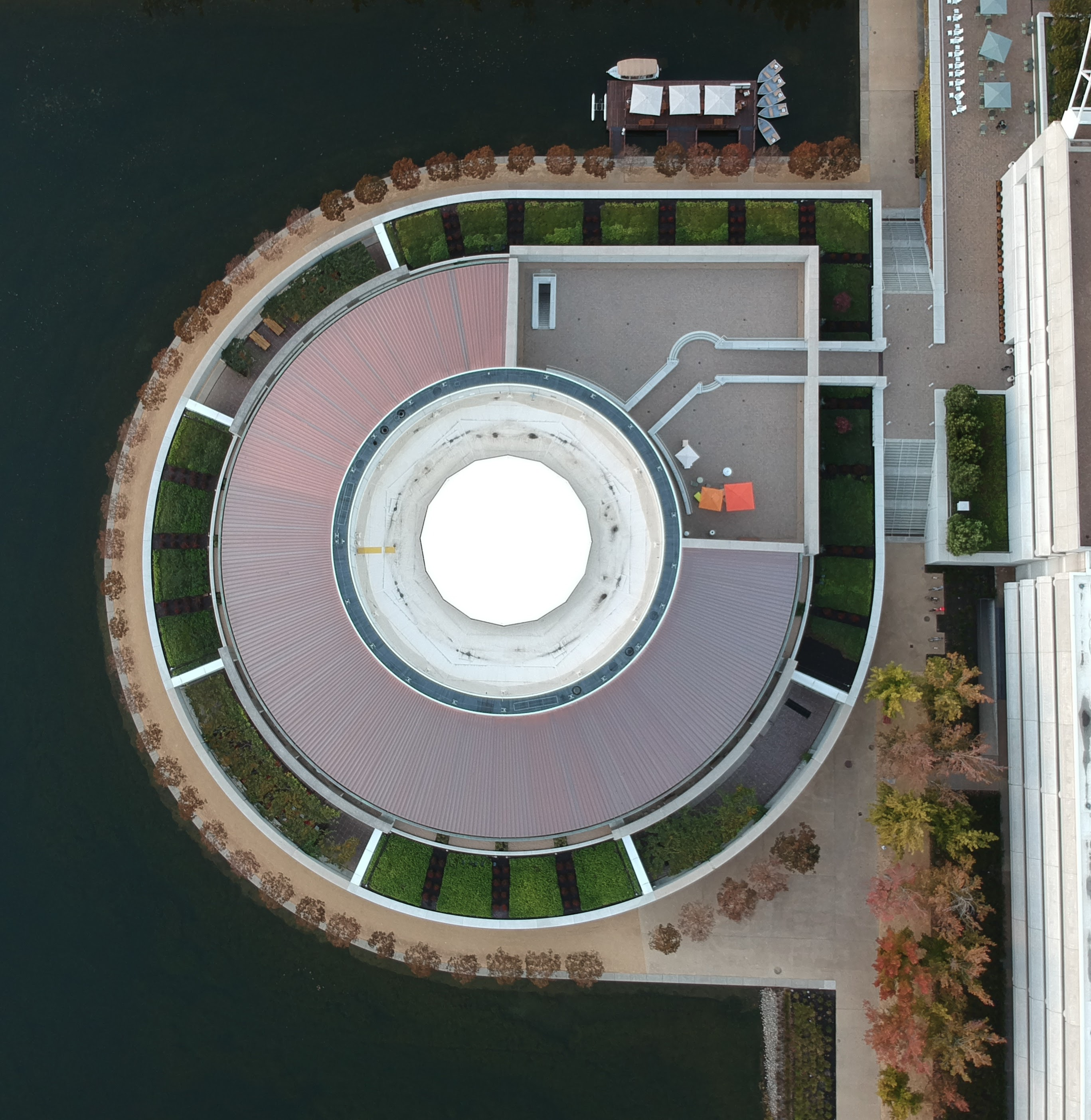
Roundhouse Market & Conference Center

The property that is now Bishop Ranch was farmland deeded to Thomas Bishop, a lawyer, as payment for his work in the separation of a Mr. and Mrs. Norris in 1891. Over the following decades, Bishop and his family expanded the ranch with pear trees, walnut groves and herds of sheep.

== Transportation ==
Bishop Ranch is one bus ride from both the Walnut Creek and Dublin BART stations, with service on County Connection bus routes including 96X, 97X and 35. The 35 serving busses (Not X) Dougherty Valley and Dublin BART run throughout the day.
