= Tri-Valley Community Television =

Public access TV channel in California, United States

TV30 (Cable)
- Pleasanton, California
- Channels: Analog: 30 (Comcast Cable)

Ownership
- Owner: Tri-Valley Community Television Corporation

History
- Founded: 1976
- Call sign meaning: "TV" Stands for "Tri-Valley" and "Television"

Technical information
- Translator(s): 28 & 29

Links
- Website: www.TV30.org

Tri-Valley Community Television (TV30) is a nonprofit public-access television, educational-access television and government-access television (GATV) (PEG) channel serving the Tri-Valley area of California. Its service area includes Livermore, Dublin, Pleasanton and San Ramon. The station operates channels 28, 29 and 30 on the Comcast Cable TV system. It can also be seen throughout the San Francisco Bay Area on AT&T U-verse VDSL service. Until mid-2007, TV30 was one of the few community cable stations with a live daily newscast.

== History ==
Tri-Valley Community Television was founded in 1976 by Darla Stevens, Charlotte Severin, Marshall Kamena and Lee Horner. Originally known as CTV 30 (Community Television channel 30), the station expanded from broadcasting a few hours each day to carrying 30 programs across three channels. By the 1980s, it had expanded beyond coverage of local events and began producing studio programs with the help of the local cable company.

Darla Stevens was executive director of the 501(c)3 California Nonprofit Public Benefit Corporation known as Tri-Valley Community Television until her retirement in November 2003. At that point, then Operations Manager Sheila Tole replaced Stevens as interim Executive Director. In March 2004, Bruce Goddard was hired for the position of Executive Director and Tole departed. Goddard instituted many changes in concert with city staff and the board. However, Goddard left the station the following December, amid accusations by employees Goddard had laid off. Production company owner Glenn Davis was hired as his replacement in July 2005. Davis resigned in early 2008 after an investigation into sexual harassment claims could not support nor deny any claims.

In 2004, the station renamed itself TV30. That change came with several other attempts to revamp the "look" of the station. The name of the newscast was changed from "The 580/680 News" to "TV30 News." The news set was changed from a blue-lit grey set handed down from a San Francisco network affiliate, to a remodeled salmon one built by station employees. In Fall 2005, the set was changed again, this time to a new professionally designed one. This was the first of many moves that sent the station hurtling into debt. TV30 News was again renamed in July 2007 to "TV30 News Live at 4," to reflect what time the show airs live (the same taped version runs again at 7, 9, and 11). The change brought different graphics with it once again, the third time in as many years the on-air "look" changed. A new motto also came with the new name: "The Pictures. The Stories. Your World".

On May 1, 2007, it was reported that the station requested $65,000 from each of the four cities to keep running through the end of June (the end of the station's fiscal year). This comes after the station's board of directors was removed, and it was announced that the mayors from the four cities would oversee the station instead. TV30 had used up most of its $100,000 credit line and was $208,000 in debt. On June 30, the "TV30 News" gave its final broadcast.

In 2012, the city of San Ramon announced that, as a cost-saving measure, it would shift its support from Tri-Valley to Contra Costa Television. Since 1984, Tri-Valley had covered San Ramon, broadcasting local sports, the city's annual Christmas tree lighting, the annual "Mayor's Report," and city council meetings in exchange for an annual subsidy. Contra Costa Television offered these services at a lower price.

In 2014 Executive Director Melissa Tench-Stevens reported that the Digital TV Fairness Act would cost TV30 over $500,000 annually in lost funding.

The station's programming has included programs focused on events, people and places in the Tri-Valley area.

== Management controversies ==
In December 2004 several employees of the station were removed by Bruce Goddard. Those former employees made public accusations about his management style, and threatened lawsuits to the station's board of directors. None of the employees were reinstated but accusations on behalf of the terminated employees lead to Goddard being placed on paid administrative leave pending an investigation. No results were officially released. Goddard refused public comment and chose to resign rather than continue under the cloud.

After an extensive search for a successor, Glenn Davis was hired as the station's new executive director on July 1, 2005. Davis' reign has had its own share of controversies, with the station falling significantly into debt since his inception. After Davis was hired, the station operated in the red for two years in a row for the first time ever. Furthermore, in mid-August 2007, a Contra Costa Times article came out that said the station was being sued for sexual harassment by the former news director, with Davis the main target of the suit. In late December, another employee made similar accusations, and Davis was again placed on administrative leave.

According to a March 5, 2008 article in Pleasanton Weekly, Davis resigned after an investigator concluded there was "insufficient evidence" to support the claims of harassment made by one former and another current employee. A lawsuit is still pending in Alameda County Superior Court.

A March 7, 2008 East Bay Times article says "While the board of directors credited Davis with reversing the long-deteriorating technical condition of the station and restructuring the program schedule, he is also associated with the financial overages that led to budget deficits two years in a row." Indeed, Davis oversaw several graphics upgrades and new set designs. Long-running program "Everything Local" was also taken from a low-budget in-studio community affairs program to a flashy magazine program under Davis's watch.

Dublin Mayor Janet Lockhart also told the newspaper "It was never intended that we would all be financing a fully functioning competitive station -- that's not what we originally started out to be.... Some of the management leadership has kind of led us in that direction."

Following an independent investigation looking into the second sexual harassment investigation against Davis, it was determined that there was insufficient evidence with the claim, but a civil case is still pending in Alameda County. Davis resigned in March 2008.

The TV30 Board of Directors advertised for a new Executive Director in June. Roger Bradley, Administrative Analyst for Dublin, was tasked with screening the applications. Bradley received twenty applications; ten of which were selected for interviews. Bradley sent out a press release on September 12, 2008 announcing the appointment of Melissa Tench-Stevens as the new Executive Director of TV30. Tench-Stevens is currently the president and CEO of The Evers Group, LLC in San Jose.

== Programming ==
Tri-Valley Community Television broadcasts public meetings on an ongoing basis, including city council meetings from each of the four participating jurisdictions, as well as meetings of the Pleasanton School Board, the Dublin School Board, the Livermore School Board and the Livermore Area Recreation and Park District. Most of the station's programming airs on channel 30, while meetings are primarily broadcast on channels 28 and 29.

One of the longest running shows at the station has been Let's Talk Sports. Hosted by George "Dr. B" Baljevich, the show grew from a call-in talk show, to a studio interview talkshow, and later a field production at TV30. The last in-studio taping of this show took place in 2004.

Everything Local is another long-running show that started off in-studio, then moved to the field. It was at first hosted by various faces at the station. When it moved to the field, it was hosted by Eboni Warnking, and is now no longer in production.

The station also receives money to produce and air several shows, including Livermore Life (paid for by the Livermore Downtown Association) and COPPS (City of Pleasanton Police).

Lately there has been a shift away from locally produced programming such as Media Roundtable and Everything Local. The station has started airing programs produced by outside sources such as the University of Hawaii-produced Growing Old in a New Age, and the PBS program California Connected.

=== Local shows produced and aired by TV30 ===
- Conversations With Mel McKay
- SLIPSTREAM
- Let's Talk Sports
- Supervisor's Report with Nate Miley
- Supervisor's Report with David Haubert
- Mayors Report
- Slice of Life Tri-Valley
- Tri-Valley Sports Final
- About The Tri-Valley
- Your Schools
- TV30 Athletic Awards
- Tri-Valley Youth View
- Valley Gardener

=== TV30 shows no longer being produced ===
- Ask The Doctor
- Everything Local
- Magic Mike's Funhouse
- Media Roundtable
- Positively Pleasanton
- The Real Estate Show
- TV30 Weekend (Sometimes referred to as TV30 News: Weekend Edition)
- TV30 News
- Valley Forum
- Spice of Life
- COPPS

=== TV30 News ===
The station's flagship show was the live newscast, titled "TV30 News Live At 4" at the time of its cancellation. TV30 was one of the only community cable stations in the country to have a live, daily newscast. It debuted as "580/680 News", but became "TV30 News" in 2005. In 2007, the name changed again, this time to "TV30 News Live At 4" to emphasize its live presence. That change brought new features, including a controversial traffic segment.

The show was anchored by Tom Morrison since its inception in 1988. George "Dr. B" Baljevich" anchored sports since the beginning. Ian Bartholomew was also a sports anchor, joining in the early 1990s. Shortly after the newscast was launched, Robin Fahr joined Tom Morrison as co-anchor for the show. By 2005, Fahr was only anchoring one or two days a week with Michelle Soba anchoring or Morrison solo-anchoring the rest of the week. Soba took over the desk full-time that year. She left in early 2007, and was replaced by Melinda Meza.

By early 2008, financial problems at the station began to mount, with the news bearing the brunt of the blame. In a March 5, 2008 Pleasanton Weekly article, Dublin Mayor and TV30 board chair Janet Lockhart was quoted as saying "The news program is the most expensive in the station lineup." Lockhart raised concerns over the newscast in the Pleasanton Weekly article, "It makes no sense to me to have a live traffic report aired at 4 p.m. and then the same news repeated through the evening," she added. "I also don't understand why our local station reports on news you can watch on regular stations, such as the latest Britney Spears scandal."

Citing increased costs at keeping the news afloat, the board ultimately canceled "TV30 News Live at 4" in April 2008. The board is considering a weekly or monthly news magazine in its place.
