= Marshall Drummond =

American academic administrator

Dr. Marshall (Mark) Drummond is an American academic administrator. He served as an advisor to the Minister of Higher Education and Scientific Research in the United Arab Emirates and held several ceremonial titles in that regard. He was formerly Chancellor of the Los Angeles Community College District for two separate terms. Drummond graduated San José State University with a BS in Management and Economics, and MBA. In 1979 he graduated from the University of San Francisco receiving the doctorate of education. He is a 1959 alumnus of Menlo Atherton High School.

Previously, he was the Chancellor of the California Community Colleges system from January 2004 through July 2007. He left the system office in August 2007 to return to the Los Angeles Community College District as its chancellor, a post he previously held for six and a half years. Drummond has also been president of Eastern Washington University a post that he held for over 10 years. and professor of business and data processing at Chabot College in Hayward, California.

Drummond is known for breeding, raising and training Tennessee Walking Horses. One of the horses he bred and raised, Double Java, has won many championships. Drummond also breeds, trains and raises mules, and has won recognition at Mule Days and other events.
