= Emerald High School =

Location
- 3600 Central Parkway, Dublin, CA 94568; United States; 37.7088°N 121.8637°W

Information
- Type: Public high school
- Established: 2023
- School district: Dublin Unified School District
- Principal: Lenni Velez
- Grades: 9–12
- Gender: Coeducational
- Enrollment: 346 (2023-2024)
- Campus size: 23.46 acres (9.49 ha)
- Campus type: Suburban
- Colors: Green, blue, and white
- Mascot: Aerouant
- Website: ehs.dublinusd.org

Emerald High School is a four-year high school in the Dublin Unified School District in Dublin, California, USA. The school opened to students for the 2023–2024 school year, and in August 2024 classes began on its own campus, scheduled for completion in the 2026-2027 school year, with all four grades on campus.

== Background ==
In the 2010s, Dublin was the fastest growing city in California. Enrollment in Dublin Unified School District increased 92% over that decade and by approximately 4,000 between 2014 and 2024, and the district has opened several new schools. Emerald High School is the district's second high school; it also has a continuation school. It is the first comprehensive high school built in Alameda County since the opening of Foothill High School in Pleasanton in 1973. After a committee had chosen three finalists from among community suggestions for the new school's name, on August 18, 2020, the school district board unanimously chose "Emerald High School". The school was originally projected to open in fall 2022, but instead opened to students the 2023-2024 school year with the first freshman class, and classes began in the 2024-2025 school year, opening with both freshman (9th graders) and sophomores (10th graders). In the 2025-2026 school year, Emerald welcomed freshman (9th graders), sophomores (10th graders), and juniors (11th graders). They will have seniors in the 2026-2027 school year, meaning that the Class of 2027 is the first to graduate Emerald High School.

== Opening ==
The first freshman class of Emerald High School students studied on the campus of Dublin High School during the 2023–2024 academic year, primarily in portable classrooms. The administration was housed in a portable that had previously been a science classroom. A tour of the new campus was held in April 2024, and a ribbon-cutting on June 8, 2024; it opened to freshmen and sophomores for the 2024–2025 academic year, on August 13, 2024. Expected enrollment in the first year is 950, in 42 classrooms; a grade level will be added each year until scheduled completion in 2026, when the school will have more than 80 classrooms and a capacity of approximately 2,500. The cost of the building is $374 million, funded by taxpayer bonds.

Principal Francis Rojas resigned in October 2024 and the assistant principal, Lenni Velez, was appointed principal.

== Facilities ==
The campus encompasses 23.46 acres (9.49 ha) on the east side of Dublin. It includes two academic towers, an administration building, library, visual and performing arts center, student center and wellness center, gym, and sports field. The Catherine Kuo Performing Arts Center will be completed by April 2027.

== Athletics ==
The school's teams are the Aerouants, dragon-like Celtic folklore monsters, and its colors are green, blue, and white. The mascot was chosen to reflect the Irish heritage of the city of Dublin as well as the students' preference for a sea serpent or Asian dragon to reflect the large number of Asian Americans now living in the city. In its first year, the school competed independently; starting in 2024–2025, it competes in the Bay Valley Athletic League, whose other schools are in Contra Costa County. At opening, the school's facilities included a 31,000-square-foot (2,900 m^{2}) gym, eight tennis courts, and a weight room with rowing machines; a swimming pool is to be added. A shortened version of the mascot, and referred to often, is Aeros.
