= Stephanie Chandler =

American entrepreneur and author

- Education: Chabot College
- Occupations: Entrepreneur, author
- Website: StephanieChandler.com

Stephanie Chandler is an American entrepreneur, author and publisher.

== Background ==
Chandler is the author of several books including The Nonfiction Book Publishing Plan, Own Your Niche and The Nonfiction Book Marketing Plan.

Chandler is also founder and CEO of Authority Publishing, the Nonfiction Authors Association, a marketing community for authors, and the Nonfiction Writers Conference, an annual event conducted entirely online. Some of Chandler's past clients include Lenovo, Visa Business Network, The UPS Store, Yahoo! Small Business, Dell, American Express Open and Deluxe Corporation.

She is a speaker at business events and on the radio and has been featured and discussed in Entrepreneur, Los Angeles Times, Inc., Minneapolis Star Tribune, BusinessWeek, New York Times, and Wired magazine. She is also a blogger for Forbes.

Her first book The Business Startup Checklist and Planning Guide, received a Book of the Year award by Foreword magazine. In 2012, she was honored as one of the Top 100 Small Business Influencers by Small Business Trends, while Own Your Niche was chosen Best Business Book by the Global Ebook Awards.

== Early career ==
Chandler spent a decade working in Silicon Valley in various roles including software sales, technical training, and technical support. In 2003, she opened a 2,800 square-foot bookstore in Sacramento, California. In 2004, she launched BusinessInfoGuide.com, a directory of resources for entrepreneurs, and began writing books about small business marketing. The bookstore was sold in 2007. In 2008, she founded Authority Publishing, a custom publisher specializing in nonfiction books and social media marketing services.

== Recognition ==
- Best Business Book Award at Global Ebook Awards (2012)
- Named in the Top 100 Small Business Influencers by Small Business Trends (2012)
- Book of the Year Award (Silver) recipient from Foreword magazine (2005)
- Finalist for the Stevie's Women in Business Awards

== Books ==
- The Nonfiction Book Publishing Plan: The Professional Guide to Profitable Self-Publishing (Authority Publishing, September 2018)
- The Nonfiction Book Marketing Plan: Online and Offline Promotion Strategies to Build Your Audience and Sell More Books (Authority Publishing, June 2013)
- Own Your Niche: Hype-Free Internet Marketing Tactics to Establish Authority in Your Field and Promote Your Service-Based Business (Authority Publishing, February 2012)
- The Conference Catcher: An Organized Journal for Capturing Ideas, Resources, and Action Items at Educational Conferences, Trade Shows, and Events (Authority Publishing, February 2011)
- Booked Up! How to Write, Publish, and Promote a Book to Grow Your Business (Authority Publishing, October 2010)
- LEAP! 101 Ways to Grow Your Business (Career Press, September 2009)
- The Author’s Guide to Building an Online Platform: Leveraging the Internet to Sell More Books (Quill Driver Press, May 2008)
- From Entrepreneur to Infopreneur: Make Money with Books, eBooks and Information Products (John Wiley & Sons, December 2006)
- The Business Startup Checklist and Planning Guide: Seize Your Entrepreneurial Dreams! (Aventine Press, September 2005)
