= Chabot College =

Community college in Hayward, California, US

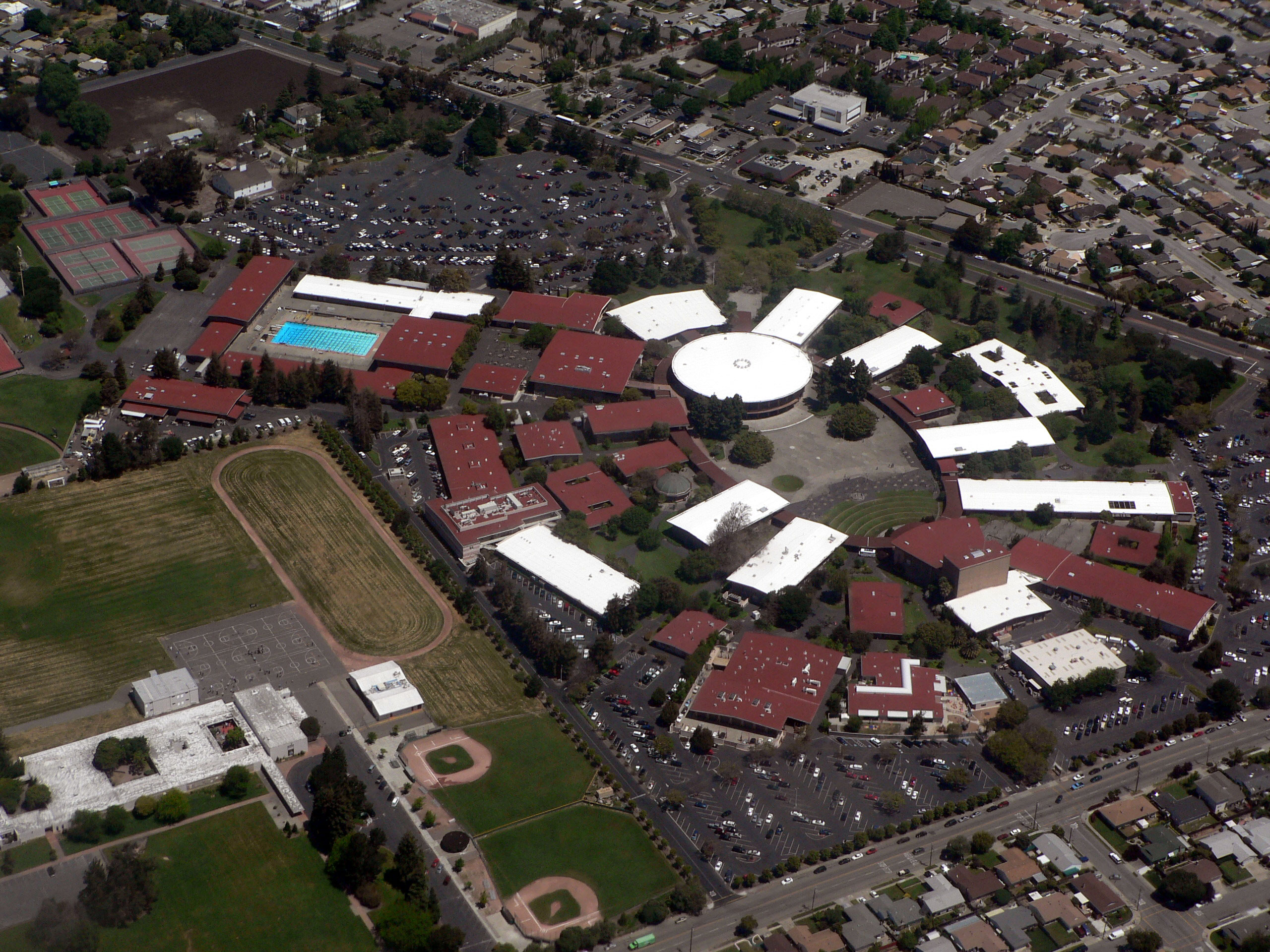
- Type: Public community college
- Established: 1961
- Affiliations: Chabot-Las Positas Community College District
- President: Jamal A. Cooks
- Administrative staff: 516
- Students: 13,145
- Location: Hayward, California, United States; 37°38′28″N 122°6′20″W
- Campus: Suburban, 94 acres (380,000 m^{2})
- Mascot: Gladiator
- Website: www.chabotcollege.edu

- Location in California

Chabot College (Chabot or CC; /ʃəˈboʊ/ shə-BOH) is a public community college in Hayward, California. It is part of the Chabot-Las Positas Community College District.

== History ==
Chabot College was the first college opened by the Chabot-Las Positas Community College District. The formation of a "junior college district" was approved by the voters on January 10, 1961, and the first board of trustees elected on April 18, 1961. Chabot College opened for classes on September 11, 1961, on a 7.5-acre (30,000 m^{2}) temporary site in San Leandro with an enrollment of 1,163 students. The 94-acre (380,000 m^{2}) Chabot College site on Hesperian Boulevard in Hayward opened for its first day of classes on September 20, 1965.

The college primarily serves residents of Alameda County in the East Bay area (generally the suburban region south of Oakland), including the district communities of Hayward, Castro Valley, San Leandro, San Lorenzo and Union City.

The school is named for noted Bay Area entrepreneur Anthony Chabot.

== Organization and administration ==
On August 1, 2023, Jamal A. Cooks became president of the college.

== Academic profile ==
Chabot offers a curriculum of over 175 majors of study, awarding more than 100 associate degrees and certificates. Chabot is on a semester system.

The college features six academic divisions: Applied Technology and Business, Language Arts, Math and Sciences, Physical Education and Health, the College of the Arts, and Social Sciences. The Business program offers degrees in business, Accounting, Retail Management, Business Management, Marketing and certificates in various areas, including Accounting, Health Care Management, Human Resources Assistant, Entrepreneurship, Real Estate, Marketing, Retailing, Management, etc.

=== Accreditation ===
Chabot College is accredited by the Accrediting Commission for Community and Junior Colleges. Specific programs are accredited by the Council on Dental Education, American Dental Association, the Committee on Allied Health Education and Accreditation in collaboration with the American Hospital Health Information, Management Association, and the America Medical Assisting Association. The program in nursing is accredited by the California Board of Registered Nursing. The college is approved by the California State Department of Education and is a member of the American Association of Community and Junior Colleges and the Community College League of California. Chabot College is an accredited institutional member of the National Association of Schools of Art and Design.

== Educational paths ==
Chabot provides the following academic pathways:

- Technical and career-vocational education programs
- Transfer education programs to four-year universities
- General education
- Basic skills instruction
- English as a second language programs
- Community and continuing Education programs
- Radio & Television Broadcasting

== Student Life ==
Student demographics as of Fall 2023
Race and ethnicity	Total
Hispanic	43%
White	17%
Asian	16%
African American	8%
Filipino	7%
Multiracial	6%
Unknown	3%
Pacific Islander	1%

=== Radio station KCRH ===
KCRH is an 18 watt radio station operated by the mass communications class at Chabot.

=== Television station KCTH 27 ===
Chabot College's Television Studio was established when the college first opened in 1964. It was the first West Coast College Television Station with 5 On Campus Channels that allowed instructors to receive 5 independent cable TV feeds of programming from the studio. Lately, it became the Community Media Center for the East bay by taking over Public-access television channels from Comcast due to the DIVCA (Digital Infrastructure Video Communications Act). Which makes the Studio available to the communities as well as for Educational-access television use. Local business and Individuals can now use the Leased access High Definition Studios, with access to over 100,000 viewers and on line streaming as well as AT&T-U-viewers. Currently the Station runs KCTH 27 the Educational-access television channel, KCMC 28 and 29, also Channel 99 under Hayward on AT&T U-verse. It is growing in programming and equipment.

== Athletics ==
Chabot College has 16 intercollegiate sports.

In 1987 the Chabot College ultimate disc team won the intercollegiate national championship.

The Bay Area Ambassadors soccer team has played at the Gladiator Stadium from 2009 to 2012.

== Noted people ==
=== Notable alumni ===
- Jeff Barnes, former NFL player
- Cliff Burton, bassist for the heavy metal band Metallica
- Jim Martin, guitarist, formerly of rock band Faith No More
- Lester Conner, basketball coach
- Stephanie Chandler, entrepreneur and author
- Mark Davis, Major League Baseball pitcher
- Tim Davis, football player
- Tamara De Treaux, actress who played E.T. the Extra-Terrestrial
- Manny Fernandez, former NFL player
- Ed Galigher, defensive lineman for the NFL's San Francisco 49ers and New York Jets
- Chris Geile, offensive lineman for the NFL's Detroit Lions
- Tom Hanks, Academy Award-winning actor
- Bruce Henderson, journalist and author
- Robert Jenkins, former NFL player
- Stevie Johnson, wide receiver for the NFL's San Francisco 49ers
- Von Joshua, Major League Baseball outfielder
- Eric Lane, former NFL player
- Darren Lewis, Major League Baseball outfielder
- Lorenzo Lynch, former NFL player
- Bip Roberts, All-Star Major League Baseball second baseman
- Brandon Kolb, Major League Baseball pitcher
- Aaron Ledesma, Major League Baseball infielder
- Mike McRae, Olympic long jumper
- Doug Padilla, Olympic distance runner
- Carl Potts, comic book artist
- Rick Rodriguez, Major League Baseball pitcher
- Nate Schierholtz, outfielder with the Chicago Cubs major league baseball team
- Cal Stevenson (born 1996), baseball outfielder for the San Francisco Giants
- Junior Tautalatasi, former NFL player
- Adrian Ward, former NFL player
- Lyle West, former NFL football player with NY Giants, played in Super Bowl XXXV
- Ned Yost, former Milwaukee Brewers and Kansas City Royals manager
- Mike Young, Major League Baseball outfielder

=== Faculty ===
- Marshall Drummond, business professor
- Helen Feyler-Switz, art instructor
- S. Floyd Mori, economics professor
