= Sheryl Staub-French =

American and Canadian civil engineer

Sheryl Staub-French is an American and Canadian civil engineer who works as a professor of civil engineering at the University of British Columbia, where she directs the BIM TOPiCS Lab and is associate dean for equity, diversity, and education in the Faculty of Applied Science. Her research concerns building information modeling and its application in the digital support of project management and construction management.

== Education and career ==
Staub-French graduated in 1988 from Dublin High School, in the East Bay region of California. She majored in civil engineering at Santa Clara University, a nearby Catholic university, while also playing on the university's basketball team. In 1992, she received the university's Pat Malley Award for her athletic performance; she graduated with a bachelor's degree in 1993.

After the intensity of being a student athlete, she intended that to be the end of her education, but after a year of working in industry, her interests shifted from practical structural engineering to the construction process, and she returned to graduate study at Stanford University. There, she received a master's degree before completing her Ph.D. in civil and environmental engineering in 2002. Her dissertation, Feature-driven Activity-based Cost Estimating, was supervised by Martin Fischer.

Her interest in the University of British Columbia (UBC) began as a graduate student, through meeting with a professor from there, visiting Stanford on sabbatical. She joined UBC after completing her Ph.D. In 2014, she was given the newly-founded Goldcorp Professorship in Women in Engineering, funding her to recruit more women to become engineering students at UBC. She became the first associate dean for equity, diversity, and education in 2019, and was appointed to a one-year term as interim head of the Department of Civil Engineering in 2024.

== Recognition ==
Staub-French was given Santa Clara University's Distinguished Engineering Alumni Award in 2015. She was elected to the Canadian Academy of Engineering in 2021. In 2022, she received UBC's Envisioning Equality award.

== Personal life ==
Staub-French is married to Julia Staub-French, the executive director of a non-profit agency, Family Services of the North Shore. They have two children.
