= Helen Feyler-Switz =

American artist

- Helen Shafter Feyler, from the 1964 yearbook of Long Beach State College
- Born: Helen Shafter; March 25, 1925; Philadelphia, Pennsylvania, United States
- Died: July 18, 2006 (aged 81); Fremont, California, United States
- Occupations: Artist, art instructor

Helen Shafter Feyler-Switz (March 25, 1925 – July 18, 2006) was an American artist and art instructor, based in California.

== Early life and education ==
Helen Shafter was born in Philadelphia, the daughter of Wasyl (William) Shafter and Anna Cheredarchuk Shafter. Her parents were immigrants from Austria; the family's surname was Szwczuk (sometimes written Shewchuk), until her father changed it upon naturalization in 1922. Her parents' home language was Ukrainian.

Shafter earned a bachelor's degree in art and French at Temple University, and later completed a master of fine arts degree at California State University, Long Beach. In the 1960s, Feyler-Switz pursued further studies with sculptor Joop Beljon, at the Royal Academy of Art, The Hague. She also studied with François Stahly in Aspen, Colorado.

== Career ==
Working in oils, wood, bronze, and cast concrete, Feyler-Switz made paintings and sculptures and taught art at Chabot College, Ohlone College, Cypress College, Saddleback College, and California State University, Fullerton. Her sculptures were installed at California State University, Long Beach, Chabot College, the First United Methodist Church in Fremont, California, and St. Francis High School in Mountain View, California. She also designed a fountain in Fountain Valley, California, and sculptures in a reflecting pool in Rancho Santa Fe, California. Her work was seen in exhibitions throughout California from the 1960s into the 1990s.

Feyler-Switz was one of the artists included in Maurine St. Gaudens' Emerging from the Shadows: A Survey of Women Artists Working in California, 1860-1960 (four volumes, 2016), and one of her paintings was included in the related 2018 show Something Revealed: California Women Artists Emerge, 1860-1960 at the Pasadena Museum of History.

== Personal life ==
Helen Shafter married widower Alfred E. Feyler in 1949, and moved with him to California. After Feyler died in 1968, she married fellow art instructor Louis Switz in 1971. Feyler-Switz died in Fremont in 2006, at the age of 81.
