= Dublin Pioneer Cemetery =

Cemetery in Alameda County, California

Coordinates: 37°41′59″N 121°56′16″W

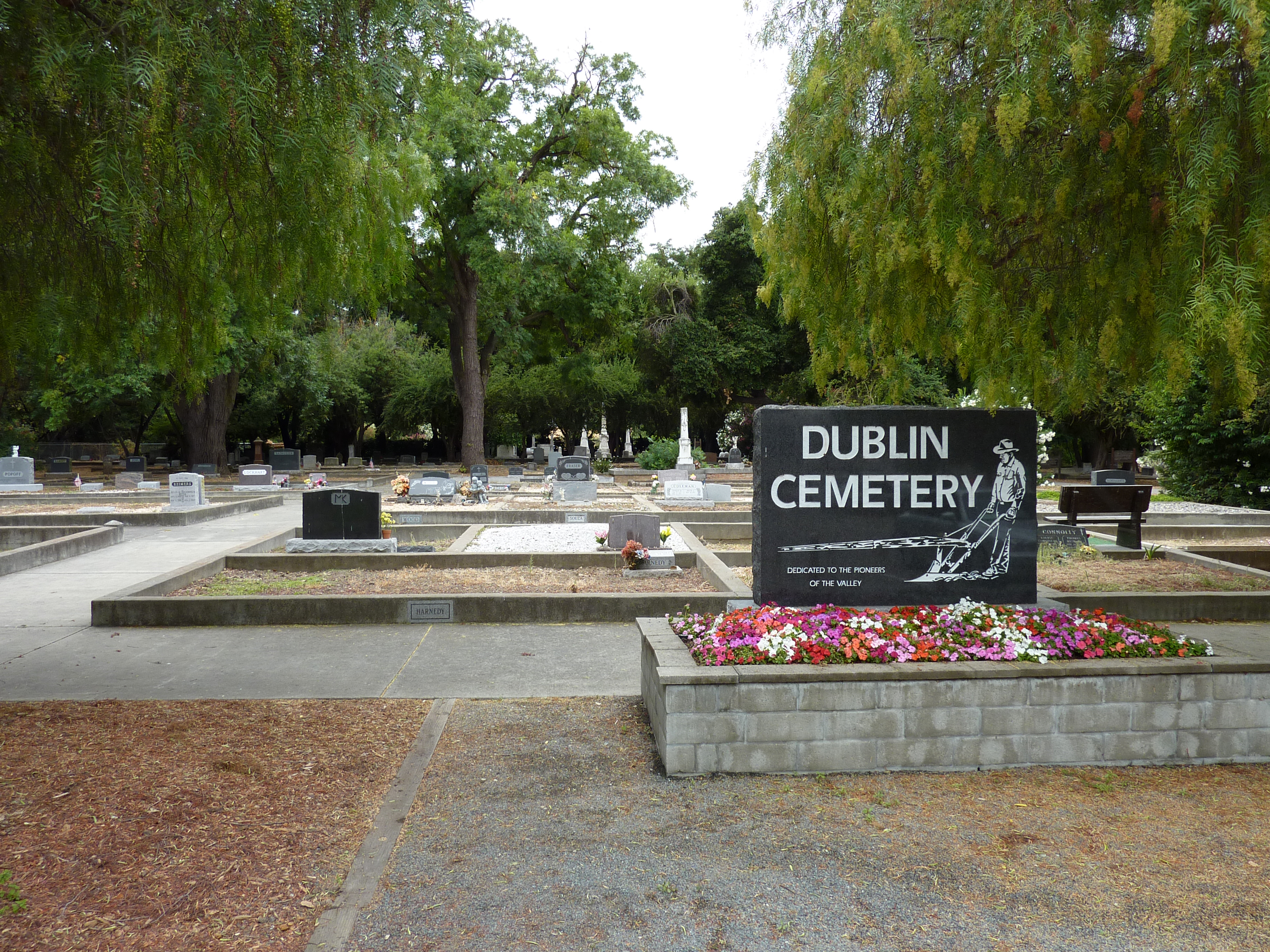
Dublin Pioneer Cemetery

The Dublin Pioneer Cemetery is located in Dublin, Alameda County, California. It contains the remains of many of the pioneer settlers who arrived in the area with the 1849 California Gold Rush. The cemetery was established in 1859 behind Old St. Raymond's Church.

Tom Donlon fell to his death while he was working on the construction of the church, and was the first person interred after its formal dedication. There is an earlier headstone dated 1852.

In 1964 the cemetery was taken over by the Dublin Cemetery, Inc. Sometime after 1990, it was acquired by the City of Dublin. As of 2006, it contained 426 graves, and it remains an active cemetery.
