= The Quarry Lane School =

Coordinates: 37°43′39.25″N 121°52′12.1″W

- 6363 Tassajara Rd. Dublin, CA 94568; United States

Information
- Type: Private
- Established: 1991
- Founder: Sabri Arac
- Faculty: 120
- Grades: Preschool - 12
- Enrollment: 950
- Mascot: Cougar
- Website: http://www.quarrylane.org

The Quarry Lane School is a private, college-preparatory and International Baccalaureate school for students in preschool through twelfth grade in Dublin, California.

== History ==
The Quarry Lane School was founded in 1991 by Sabri Arac as an infant/toddler preschool. It added an elementary school at its original Pleasanton, California campus. In 2000, Arac opened a campus in Dublin, California to accommodate the elementary school. The Pleasanton campus served only preschoolers.

In 2004, Arac opened the second Pleasanton preschool campus, the Pleasanton West campus. In 2005, the Dublin Campus expanded to include a middle school and high school. Its first class graduated in 2010.

A fourth campus, the Dublin West campus, was opened in fall 2022.

The Quarry Lane School offers college preparatory, honors, and AP classes. It offers the East Bay’s only International Baccalaureate (IB) Program in a private setting and offers both IB Diploma and Certificate Programs.

== Extracurricular activities ==
=== Clubs and activities ===
Some current Upper School clubs include Jazz Band, Chess, Drama, Photography, Journalism, Environmental, Red Cross, and Current Events.

Lower School students also take enrichment courses outside core subjects, which include Engineering, Visual/Fine Art, Computer Science, Spanish or Mandarin Chinese, Physical Education, and Music.

=== Robotics ===
Quarry Lane Robotics is offered after school for elementary through high school students. Elementary and middle school students compete in the FIRST Tech Challenge, whereas high school students compete in the FIRST Robotics Competition.

=== Competitive sports ===
As of the 2025-26 school year, the following athletics teams were available for high school students:

- Girls’ volleyball
- Boys’ volleyball
- Girls’ tennis
- Boys’ tennis
- Co-ed soccer
- Co-ed golf
- Co-ed swim
- Girls’ basketball
- Boys’ basketball
- Co-ed track and field
- Co-ed badminton

As of the 2021-22 school year, the following athletics teams were available for middle school students:

- Co-ed cross country
- Boys’ soccer
- Girls’ soccer
- Boys’ volleyball
- Girls’ volleyball
- Boys' basketball
- Girls' basketball
- Co-ed track and field
