= Dublin Hills Regional Park =

Park in California, US

- Type: Regional park
- Location: Alameda County, California
- Nearest city: Dublin, California
- Area: 654 acres (2.65 km^{2})
- Created: July 22, 2010
- Operator: East Bay Regional Park District

Dublin Hills Regional Park covers 654 acres (2,650,000 m^{2}) in Alameda County, California, United States, west of the city of Dublin. It is part of the East Bay Regional Park District (EBRPD). The park is accessible from the Donlon Hill Staging Area, which is on Dublin Boulevard near Dublin, California.

== Geography ==
Dublin Hills Regional Park is largely undeveloped and serves primarily as wildlife habitat. There are several trails within the park that serve hikers, bikers and equestrians. However, there are no reservable campsites or picnic sites. The most notable geographic feature in the park is a ridge which starts at Donlon Point, on the southern boundary of the park, and runs northward to Wiedeman Hill, which lies outside the northern boundary. The ridge acts as an open space corridor through the park, although it is interspersed with steep canyons.

=== Boundaries ===
The park is bounded on the south by I-580, Schaefer Ranch on the southwest, private grazing land to the northwest, north and northeast and the California Highlands on the southeast.

=== Hiking ===
The main trail in the park, the 2-mile Calaveras Ridge Regional Trail, follows the Calaveras Ridge into the Dublin Hills. Towards the end of the trail, the Calaveras Ridge merges with higher mountains, and the trail divides, both parts coming to an end at private property shortly after.

The Calaveras Trail does not climb to the top of Donlon Point. To climb Donlon Point, a 1/3-mile trail must be taken to the top of this hill.

A network of short trails (the Donlon Loop Trail) leads to a housing development along Dublin Boulevard. Hikers are not allowed to park in this housing development. A loop can be made with this network of short trails, although this route is too narrow for cyclists and equestrians. A further Martin Canyon Creek Trail, which connects to both the Donlon Loop Trail and the Calaveras Ridge Trail, goes in the direction of the Martin Canyon Creek Trail open space. Other minor trails come to dead-ends at the edges of the park.

== History ==
According to the Dublin Hills Regional Park map, some of the grasslands in Dublin Hills Regional Park have not been touched by man since the 1800s. Much of the Dublin Hills area, like Vargas Plateau, was originally ranchland.

At its opening in July 2010, the park covered 520 acres. EBRPD had bought about 400 acres (1,600,000 m^{2}) of land for $2.3 million, while developers contributed 120 acres (490,000 m^{2}).

In September, 2015, EBRPD announced that it had bought a 362 acres (1.46 km^{2}) parcel of land on the northern boundary of the Dublin Hills park that was owned by the Wiedemann Ranch. This parcel would become part of Bishop Ranch Open Space Reserve and would connect the Bishop Ranch preserve with the Dublin Hills park.
