= Chabot–Las Positas Community College District =

Local college administrative unit in California, USA

Location
- 7600 Dublin Blvd., 3rd Floor; Dublin, California 94568 United States
- Coordinates: 37.703545°N 121.9298°W

District information
- Schools: Chabot College; Las Positas College

Other information
- Website: www.clpccd.cc.ca.us

The Chabot–Las Positas Community College District is a public school district based in Alameda County, California, in the United States. Colleges in the district include Chabot College in Hayward, and Las Positas College in Livermore.
