= Adrian Ward (American football) =

American gridiron football player (born 1982)

Profile
- Position: Cornerback

Personal information
- Born: July 1, 1982 (age 44); Berkeley, California, U.S.
- Listed height: 5 ft 10 in (1.78 m)
- Listed weight: 170 lb (77 kg)

Career information
- College: UTEP
- NFL draft: 2005: 7th round, 219th overall pick

Career history
- Minnesota Vikings (2005)*; New York Giants (2005)*; Calgary Stampeders (2007)*
- * Offseason or practice squad member only

Adrian Michael Ward (born July 1, 1982) is an American former professional football cornerback for the Minnesota Vikings and the New York Giants in the National Football League (NFL). He played college football for the University of Texas at El Paso after attending Chabot College in Hayward, California. He was selected by the Vikings in the seventh round of the 2005 NFL draft with the 219th overall pick. Waived by the Vikings in September 2005, Ward was signed a little over a week later to the Giants' practice squad, on which he competed briefly. In 2007, the Calgary Stampeders of the Canadian Football League (CFL) signed him as a free agent.
