= Dublin High School (California) =

Public high school in California, United States

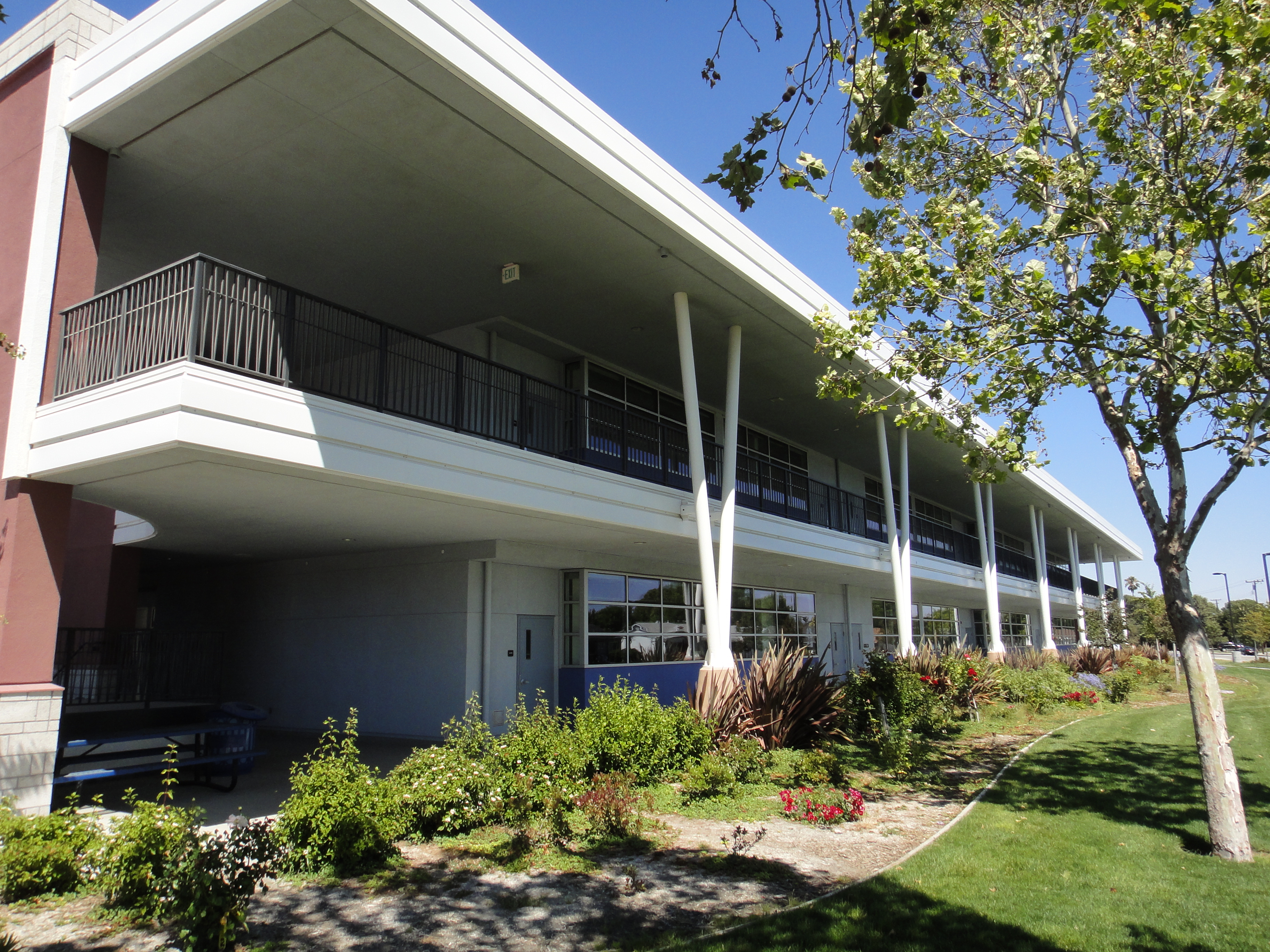
- DHS Math & Science Building

Location
- 8151 Village Parkway; Dublin, California 94568; United States; 37°43′13.1″N 121°55′32.48″W

Information
- Type: Public high school
- Established: 1968
- Principal: Maureen Byrne
- Faculty: 137.46 (FTE)
- Enrollment: 3,224 (2023–2024)
- Student to teacher ratio: 23.45
- Campus type: Suburban
- Colors: Navy blue and white (& red - less frequent)
- Mascot: Grady The Gael
- Nickname: DHS
- Feeder schools: Wells Middle School; Fallon Middle School; Cottonwood Creek K-8 School
- Website: Dublin High School

Dublin High School is a four-year high school located in the East San Francisco Bay Area. It is one of the two high schools in Dublin, California, along with Emerald High School and serves about 3,200 students.

== History ==
By the peak of the California Gold Rush in the 1850s, Dublin had established itself as a significant crossroads city in the San Francisco Bay Area. The Murray School District, consisting of the quaint Murray School, was established in 1866 to meet the educational needs of an ever-increasing population. This proved satisfactory until the late 1950s after World War II, when real estate developers chose Dublin as a site for large-scale suburban development. The population subsequently skyrocketed, from 750 to 13,641 by 1970.

The city scrambled to expand the school system, opening and closing several schools within the next few decades. Dublin High School was established amidst this process in 1968—first as the second high school in Pleasanton, California, sharing the campus of Amador Valley High School by means of a staggered schedule for the 1968–69 school year. The school moved to its current campus in Fall 1969. Its first senior class graduated in June 1971. After the incorporation of the City of Dublin in 1982, Dublin High combined with the Murray School District to form the Dublin Unified School District in July 1988.

In organizational meetings during the summer of 1968 in Pleasanton, chaired by the new Dublin Assistant Principal Robert Hagler and attended by a committee of students, the school colors and mascot were proposed and adopted by the student body later that year. Given the school's Irish place name, Hagler had suggested that the mascot (the Gael) and colors (red and blue) of nearby Saint Mary's College of California might be an appropriate starting point for the discussions, and the committee eventually agreed with Hagler's idea, while adding white to the colors. In a gesture of good will, Saint Mary's donated athletic gear to the new school's athletic department.

=== Modern issues and renovations ===
73.2% of Dublin voters approved a $184 million bond measure in the November 2004 election, which the Dublin Unified School District planned to use in funding various school renovation projects. Dublin High School was the primary beneficiary of the measure, with $120 million dedicated to a complete renewal of the campus (which began in 2008 and was completed in 2015). The renewal included a new 500-seat Center for Performing Arts and Education, a modernization of the 1968 gymnasium, and a new courtyard.

Over time, this too proved insufficient. Dublin's population continued to drastically increase in the 21st century, reaching a total of 46,036 by the year 2010. By 2015, the Dublin Unified School District outlined a second comprehensive high school as one of its top priorities—as listed in its Facilities Master Plan—citing a survey showing Dublin High faculty members' desires for additional classrooms and renovations of old facilities. By September 2020, plans to build and open the new Emerald High School were finalized.

Dublin voters also passed another $99 million bond measure in 2012 to fund the construction of a 47,000 sq. ft. Science and Engineering Building, which was completed in April 2021.

In the meantime, 2017 saw a beginning of protest and outcry from Dublin High teachers, who had struggled with increased class sizes without proper staffing accommodation or financial compensation. As negotiations for appropriate pay raises and contractual improvements stagnated for months, members and supporters of the Dublin Teachers Association (DTA) took to the streets in a candlelight march to the District office, culminating in a series of statements at the ongoing School Board meeting. This was the first of several marches which took place within the next couple years. In March 2019, the DTA threatened to go on strike if negotiations remained stagnant; a tentative agreement including a pay raise and class size limitation was reached in April.

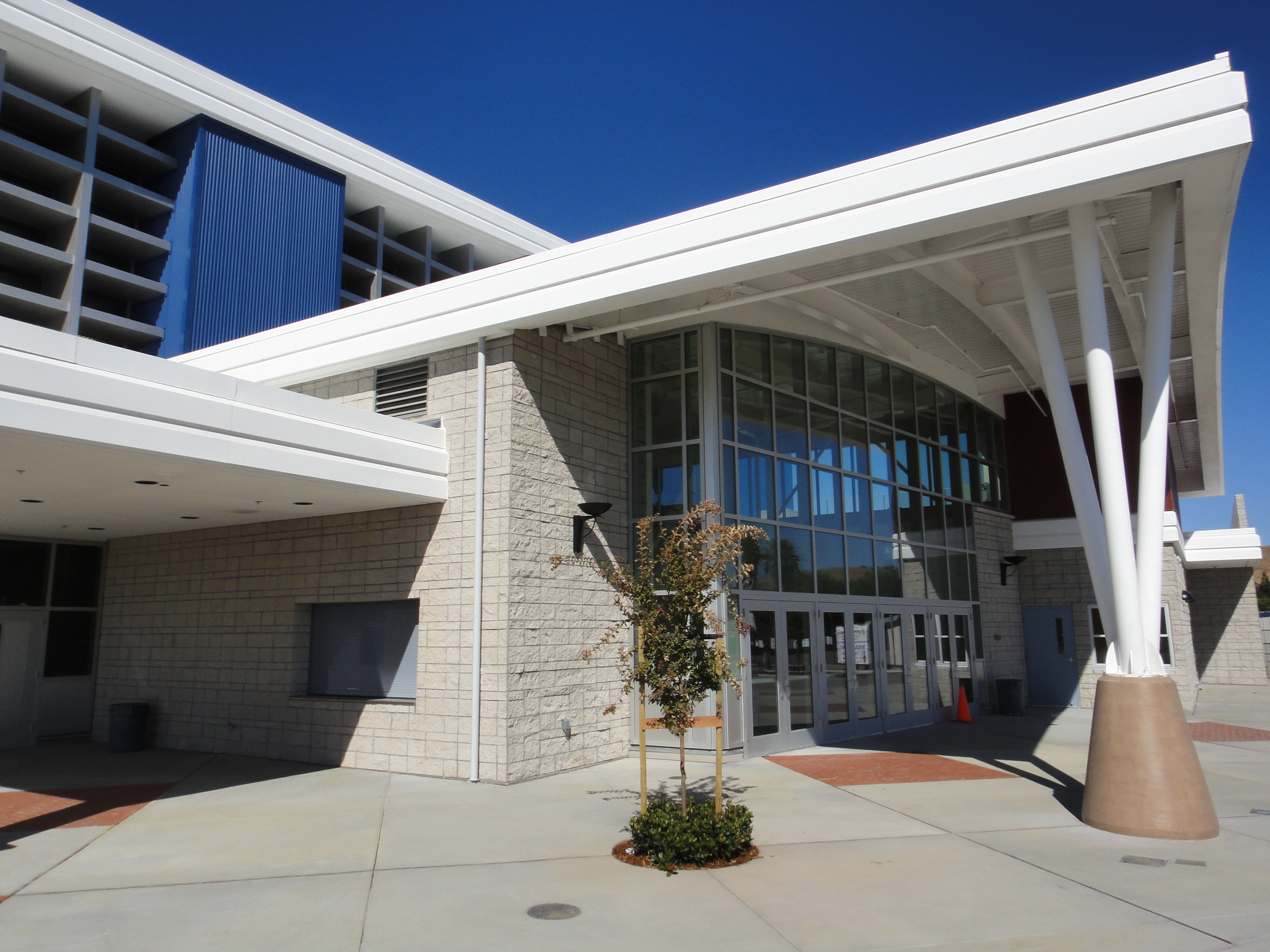
DHS Sports Complex

== Transportation ==
Dublin High School is served by three different bus routes, most of which take students from Dublin High to East Dublin and back. This service is provided by Wheels, an LAVTA bus service.

The school also has two parking lots, one located on Brighton Drive and one on Village Parkway. In 2021, the Village Parkway parking lot was expanded at the old site of the now-defunct Dublin Swim Center. Student parking is only available to juniors and seniors.

== Athletics ==
Dublin High School competes in the EBAL (East Bay Athletic League) valley league, including other schools such as Granada, Dougherty Valley and Livermore high schools.

== Music Program ==
Dublin High School Music Program has much to offer. Current Director is Jack Bainton, for Choir is Claire Yackle. There is a marching band, color guard, Wind ensemble, Symphonic band, Orchestra and Choir.

Dublin High School has multiple opportunities in the music program. It offers Marching band and color guard from August to November. It is a requirement that as a student you enroll in band camp before the start of school, the end of July. The Irish Guard attends every football game, performs in parades and competes in field show competitions.

There is Winter Percussion and Winter Guard, this is from November- April. Wind ensemble is composed of wind and percussion instrumentalists that premiere concert ensembles. Jazz Ensemble is a select group, saxophone, trumpet, trombone, guitar, keyboard, bass, and percussion players. The symphonic band is wind and percussion instrumentalists performing concert style. Orchestra is an advanced strings course, to join there is a required audition, and minimum of two years in another program. The choir has three different versions; show choir, concert choir and chamber choir.

== Notable events and accolades ==
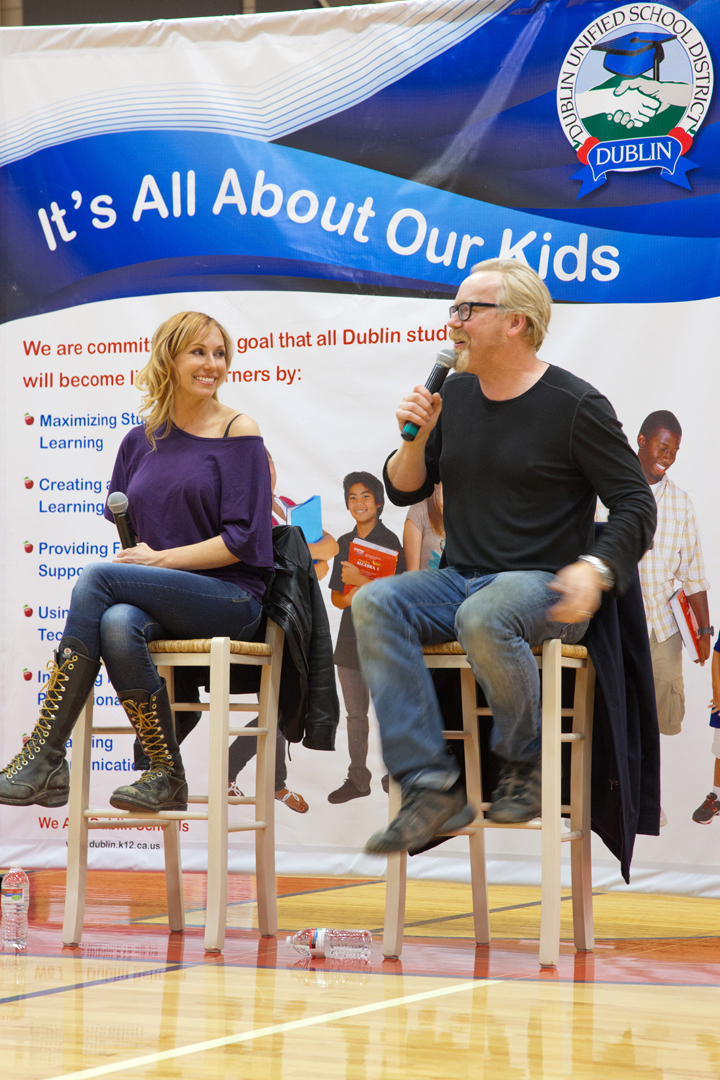
MythBusters stars at Dublin High School

On February 22, 2012, MythBusters stars Adam Savage and Kari Byron participated in a panel session at the Dublin High School Engineering and Design Academy Open House.

Teacher Eugene Chou won the 6th annual Project Lead The Way California Teacher of the Year award on February 2, 2017.

The Dublin Unified School District was recognized by Green Street Scene in 2009 with a Green Building Award for the use of green technology in the renewal of Dublin High School.

Dublin High has been given the California Distinguished School award five times. (1990, 1992, 1996, 2003, and 2017).

It was given a California Department of Education statewide rank of 10 (out of 10)

It was awarded a silver medal in the 2015 U.S. News & World Report ranking of high schools.

== Notable alumni ==
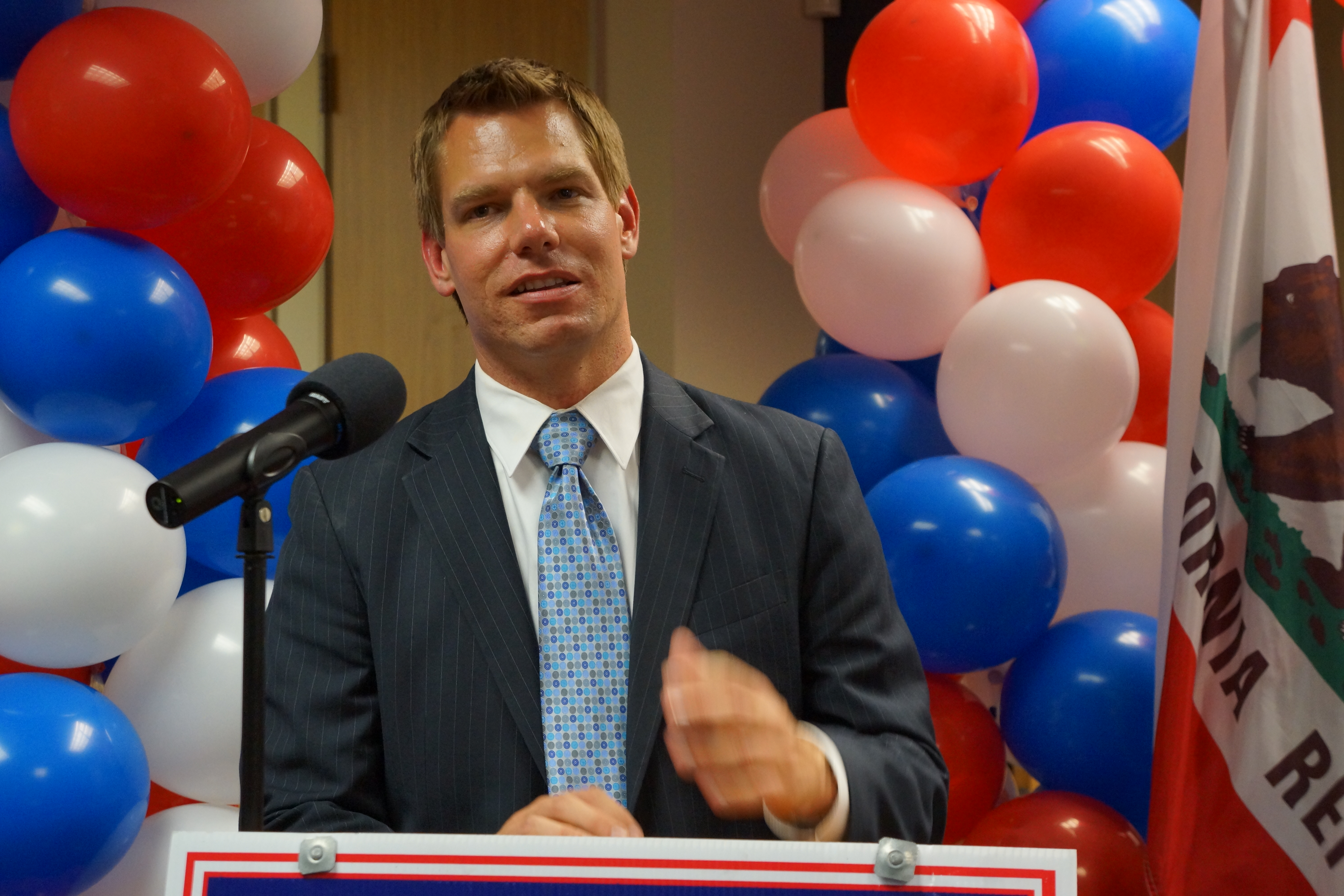
Eric Swalwell, Dublin High School Class of 1999

- Amogh Arepally, US U19 Cricketer
- Chuck Billy, singer for Testament
- Alex Cappa, NFL right guard, Tampa Bay Buccaneers, Super Bowl LV
- Tanner Damonte, professional League of Legends player for 100 Thieves
- Phil Demmel, guitarist for Machine Head
- Droop-E, Bay Area hip-hop producer and rapper
- Doug James, baritone saxophonist with Roomful of Blues, Duke Robillard, and Jimmie Vaughan’s Tilt-a-Whirl Band
- Robert Jenkins, former NFL left/right tackle and coach for the Los Angeles Rams and Oakland Raiders
- Anika Kolan, US U19 Cricketer
- Myles Parrish, musician for former hip hop and pop duo Kalin and Myles.
- Justin Peelle, NFL tight ends coach, Philadelphia Eagles
- Steve "Zetro" Souza, Singer for Exodus
- Sheryl Staub-French, civil engineering professor at the University of British Columbia
- Eric Swalwell, Congressman, United States House of Representatives, California's 14th congressional district, former candidate in the 2020 Democratic Party presidential primaries
- Ned Yost, manager of the Kansas City Royals
