= Bishop Ranch Regional Preserve =

Coordinates: 37.75563°N 121.97073°W

- Interactive map of Bishop Ranch Regional Preserve
- Location: Contra Costa County, California
- Nearest city: San Ramon, California
- Area: 806 acres (3.26 km^{2})
- Operator: East Bay Regional Park District

Bishop Ranch Regional Preserve (BRRP), also known as Bishop Ranch Regional Open Space Preserve, is a 444-acre (1.80 km^{2}) regional park on a ridge top at the edge of San Ramon, California. It is near a residential area, west of San Ramon Valley Road and south of Bollinger Canyon Road. Trails are steep and there are no facilities other than a trailhead. It is part of the East Bay Regional Park District (EBRPD).

Bishop Ranch preserve is primarily a place for observing nature. There are three trails for hiking biking and horseback riding, but no facilities for picnicking or camping. The steep terrain makes the trails generally unsuitable for wheelchairs.

In August, 2015, EBRPD announced that it had acquired a 362 acres (1.46 km^{2}) tract along the Calaveras Ridge that will be added to BRRP, connecting Bishop Ranch with Dublin Hills Regional Park. (Note: Acquisition of the Wiedemann parcel will bring the total area of BRRP to 806 acres (3.26 km^{2})). EBRPD board member Beverly Lane said this is part of an EBRPD plan to create a continuous trail that will reach from Sunol to Lafayette through six regional parks. It cost $2 million, and was previously owned by the Wiedemann family, which had raised cattle here since the 1860s. The new addition includes the local landmark, Harlan Hill, which rises to an elevation of 1,719 feet (524 m). EBRPD must complete a land-use plan for the Bishop Ranch open space, before it can open this new acquisition for public use.
