= Old St. Raymond's Church =

Historic church in California, United States

- St. Raymond Church
- U.S. National Register of Historic Places
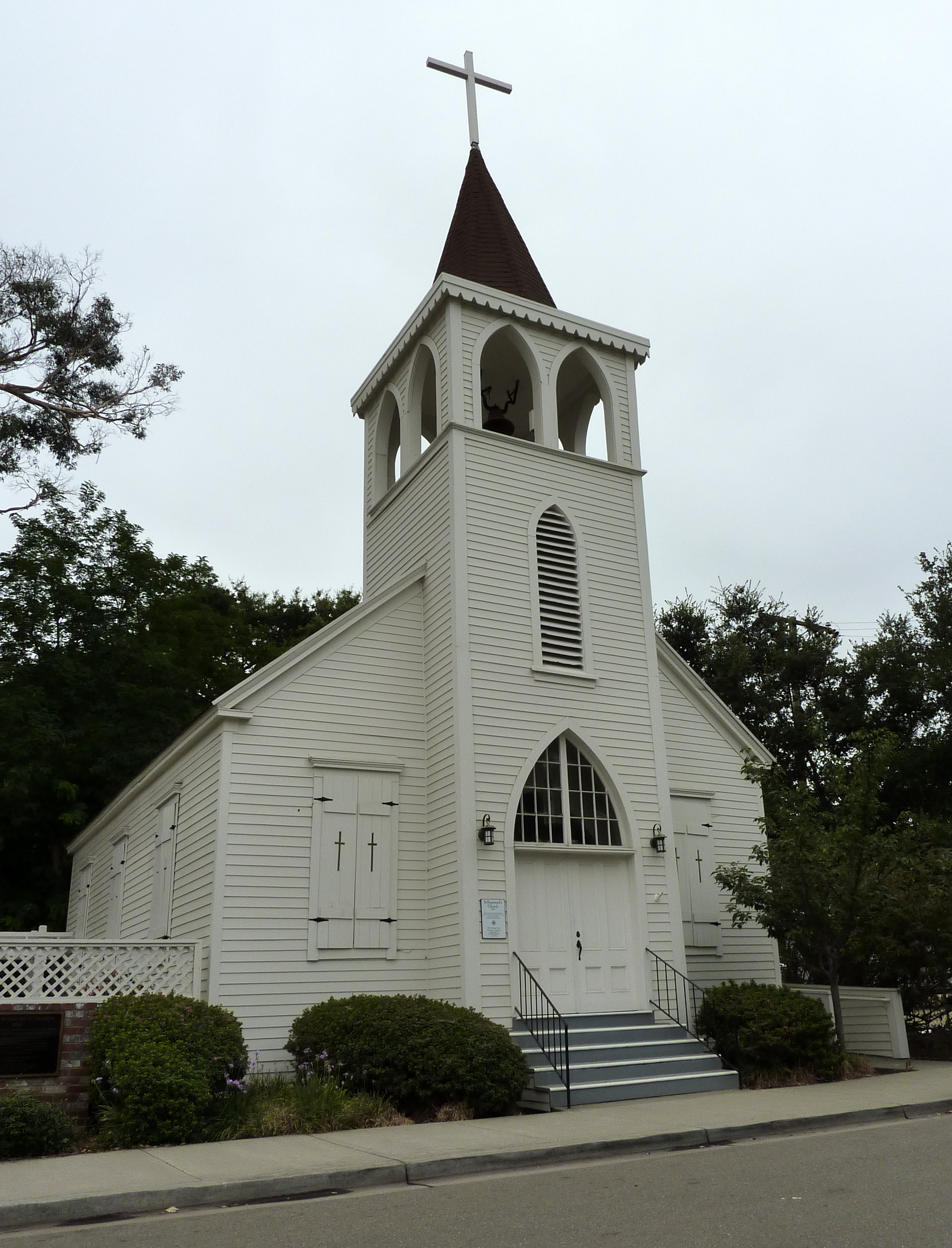
- Old St. Raymond Church

- Location within San Francisco Bay Area Location within California Location within the United States
- Location: 6600 Donlon Way, Dublin, California
- Coordinates: 37°42′0″N 121°56′17″W
- Built: 1859
- Architects: Donlon, Tom; Fallon, Jeremiah
- Architectural style: Greek Revival, Gothic
- NRHP reference No.: 06000242
- Added to NRHP: April 12, 2006

Old St. Raymond Church is a historic church in Dublin, California. The building was placed on the National Register of Historic Places on April 12, 2006.

The oldest extant Catholic church in Alameda and Contra Costa counties, it was built in 1859 and dedicated in 1860. The structure was erected on the northeast corner of 4 acres (0.016 km^{2}) of land donated by Michael Murray and Jeremiah Fallon that also served as the site of the historic Old Murray Schoolhouse and Dublin Pioneer Cemetery. Jeremiah donated $30 in cash toward the church's construction costs.

The church features simple Gothic Revival design and a New England–style white clapboard exterior along with nicked wooden benches and wide-plank redwood floors. It was constructed by the Murray and Fallon families, Irish immigrants from Elphin, County Roscommon. The families left Ireland before the Great Famine and lived in New York City before joining early wagon trains to the west—including the Donner Party. But both families parted from the Donner Party at Fort Bridger, Wyoming. Wood for the chapel came from the nearby Oakland hills; the logs were hauled by oxen and milled in Dublin. During construction of the church, pioneer Tom Donlon fell to his death on September 6, 1859. He was the first to be formally buried in the Dublin Pioneer Cemetery.

Originally a mission church, the local residents were unable to afford a full-time priest so a member of the Oakland clergy would ride to St. Raymond's once a month by mule to offer Mass. Later the church came under St. Leander's Church in San Leandro, then St. Michael's in Livermore and finally, in 1961 it came within the jurisdiction of St. Augustine's in Pleasanton. It held its first wedding in 1865 between Ellen Fallon (daughter of Jeremiah) and William Tehan. The belfry was first added in 1880. In 1966, the church moved to a new, much larger location (also named St. Raymond's Church) and the Oakland Diocese gave the old church to Amador-Livermore Valley Historical Society (ALVHS) to be preserved and restored. ALVHS put the building to many uses, then sold the church to the City of Dublin in 1993. The city was also able to acquire the adjacent Old Murray Schoolhouse and the Dublin Pioneer Cemetery to set up an area deemed the Dublin Heritage Center. The City of Dublin rents the building out for community and private use.

The first recorded renovation of Old St. Raymond's Church was 1922, and the most recent soon after the city took possession of the structure. The church's general appearance has remained unchanged since its construction in 1859. Through private donations, a new bell tower was constructed; in 1967 the church's restoration was complete.

== See also ==
- Dublin Pioneer Cemetery – established behind the church. The first burial there is of a worker who fell to his death while building the church.
