= Patelco Credit Union =

American bank

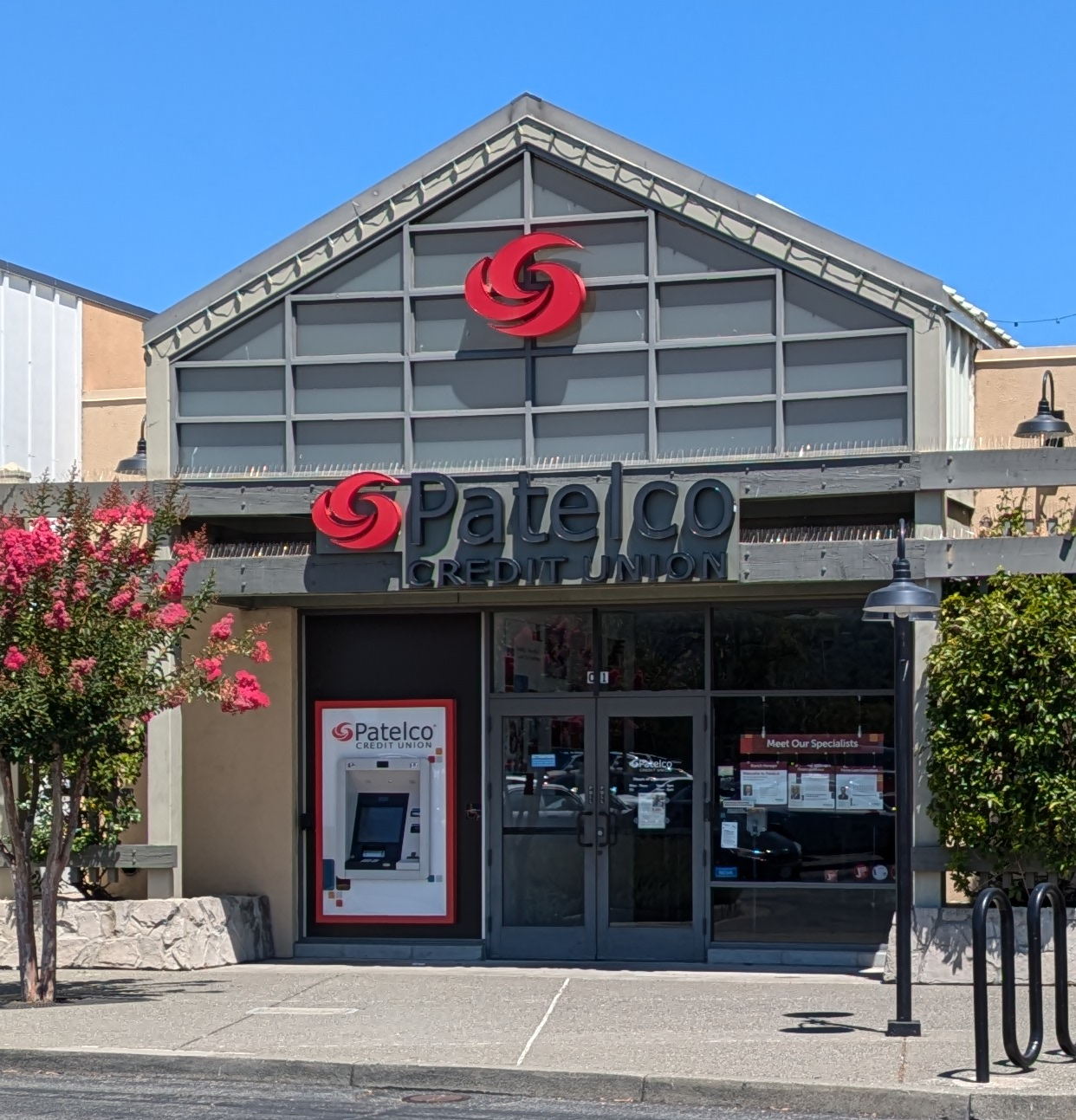
- Patelco branch in Novato
- Type: Credit union
- Industry: Financial services
- Founded: 1936
- Headquarters: Dublin, California, United States
- Number of locations: 35 Branches
- Key people: Erin Mendez, President/CEO Jesse Rivera, Board of Directors Chairman
- Services: Savings; checking; online banking; consumer loans; mortgages; credit cards; investments; insurance
- Total assets: ▲US$ 9.6 billion (2025)
- Number of employees: 750
- Website: patelco.org

Patelco Credit Union is a member owned, not-for-profit credit union that serves Northern California, particularly the San Francisco Bay Area. Founded in 1936, it is one of the oldest and largest credit unions in the country, with more than $9 billion in assets.

== History ==
Patelco Credit Union once served the former Pacific Telephone & Telegraph Company (later Pacific Bell, now known as AT&T). After the Breakup of the Bell System in 1983, it expanded its membership eligibility to the general public, and now operates 35 branches in Northern California, and nationwide through its virtual branch, online banking system and ATM network. It provides services in the form of deposits, lending, investments, and insurance.

Ken Burns became the CEO in 2009 and resigned in 2013, when the current CEO Erin Mendez took over. In 2014, Patelco had $4 billion in assets and around 279,000 members. On their 80th anniversary in 2016, Patelco had more than $5 billion in assets and 300,000 members. In 2019, Patelco reached $7 billion in assets and 350,000 members. By the end of 2025, Patelco's assets totaled more than $9.6 billion with nearly 530,000 members.

On June 29th, 2024, Patelco had experienced a ransomware attack, causing a partial service outage. It's started to provide daily updates in its Security Incident Updates & Information Center.

== Charitable Contributions ==
Patelco Credit Union has made charitable contributions through grants, volunteerism, fundraising and disaster relief efforts. Following the 2015 Lake County Fire, Patelco created a disaster relief program that provided no- or low-cost financial assistance to affected members. The program was activated in 2016 for members affected by the Clayton wildfire. Days after wildfires broke out in 2018, Patelco employees volunteered at the Redwood Empire Food Bank, where they packed more than 7,500 pounds of fruits and vegetables. Patelco also raised $234,000 through an online donation drive for three Santa Rosa nonprofit organizations .

Between 2001 and 2004, Patelco’s largest grant recipients were Habitat for Humanity East Bay/Silicon Valley, which received $185,000, and Children’s Miracle Network, which received $140,000. In 2024, Patelco provided 13 grants totaling more than $304,000 to organizations focused on food security, affordable housing, and children’s health and development. Patelco employees have also participated in fundraising and volunteer activities in the Bay Area, including Cycle of Hope and the Nourish Gala and Drive-in to Fight Hunger.
