= Dublin, California =

City in California, United States

- City
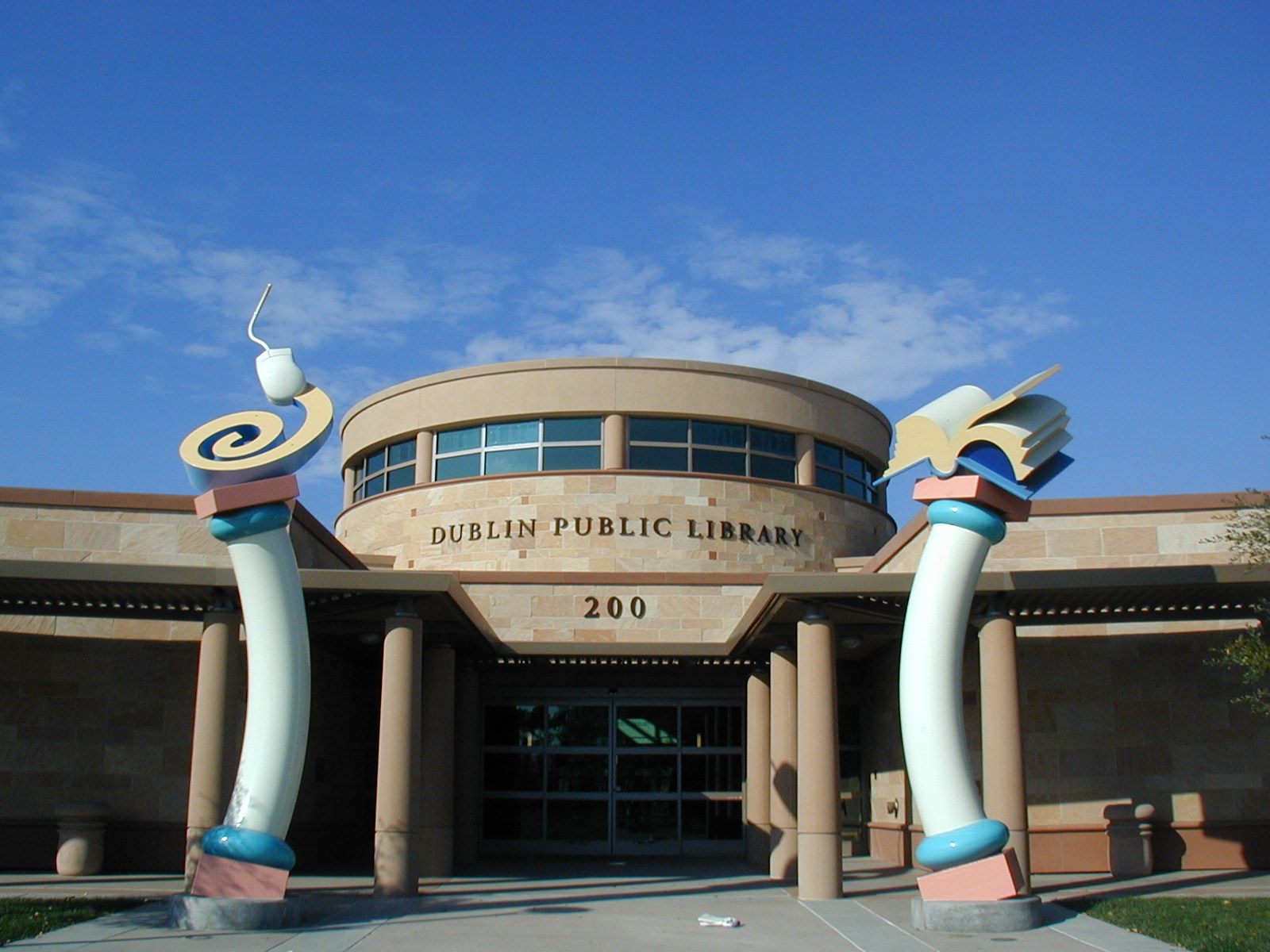
- Public library in Dublin

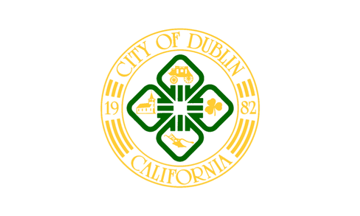
- Flag Seal
- Interactive map of Dublin, California
- Location in California Dublin, California (the United States)
- Coordinates: 37°42′08″N 121°56′09″W
- Country: United States
- State: California
- County: Alameda
- Incorporated: February 1, 1982
- Named for: Dublin, Ireland

Government
  - Mayor: Sherry Hu
  - State Senate: Jerry McNerney (D)
  - State Assembly: Rebecca Bauer-Kahan (D) and Liz Ortega (D)
  - U. S. Congress: Mark DeSaulnier (D) and Aisha Wahab (D)

Area
  - Total: 15.23 sq mi (39.44 km^{2})
  - Land: 15.23 sq mi (39.44 km^{2})
  - Water: 0 sq mi (0.00 km^{2}) 0%
- Elevation: 367 ft (112 m)

Population (2020)
  - Total: 72,589
  - Density: 4,766.5/sq mi (1,840.36/km^{2})
- Time zone: UTC−8 (PST)
  - Summer (DST): UTC−7 (PDT)
- ZIP Code: 94568
- Area code: 925
- FIPS code: 06-20018
- GNIS feature IDs: 1655980, 2410362
- Website: dublin.ca.gov

Dublin is a suburban city of the East Bay in California, United States. It is located within the Amador Valley of Alameda County's Tri-Valley region. It is located along the north side of Interstate 580 at the intersection with Interstate 680, roughly 35 miles (56 km) east of downtown San Francisco, 23 miles (37 km) east of downtown Oakland, and 31 miles (50 km) north of downtown San Jose.

The name "Dublin" is in reference to the city of Dublin, Ireland, because of the large number of Irish who lived in the area. The post office formally adopted the name in the 1890s. The area was first called Alamilla Springs, named after a spring located near the modern intersection of Dublin Boulevard and Dougherty Road. Another explanation suggests that the name may have developed from local references at the crossroads, either to a pair of inns known as the “Double Inns,” or to wagon drivers who would “double” their teams of horses before climbing a nearby hill.

Its population was 72,589 as of the 2020 census, which had grown from 46,063 in 2010. In 2013, Dublin was the second fastest-growing city in the state of California, behind only Santa Clarita. In 2019, census data showed Dublin as one of the fastest-growing cities in the country.

== History ==
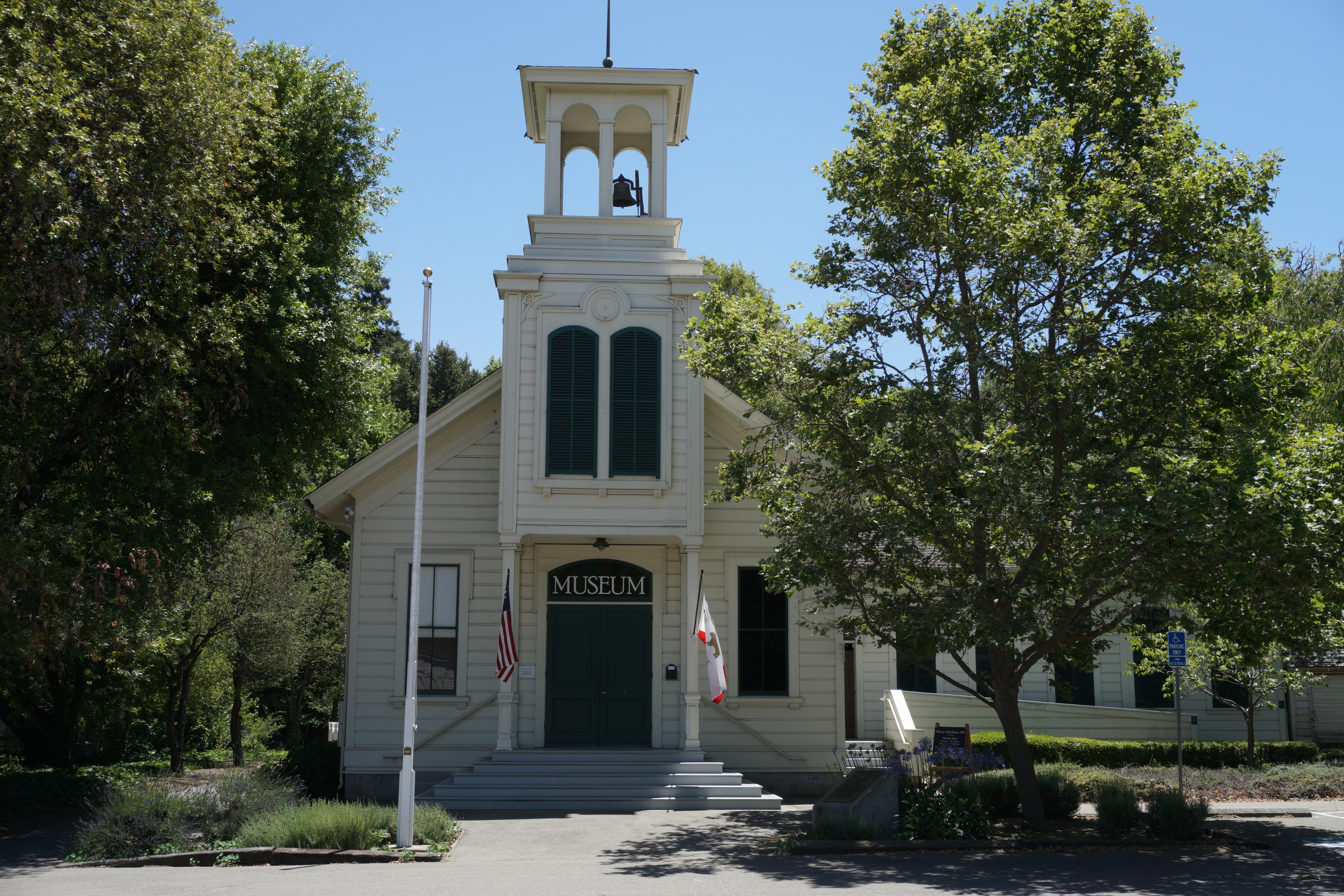
The Murray Schoolhouse was built in 1856 and moved twice to its present location in the Dublin Heritage Center.

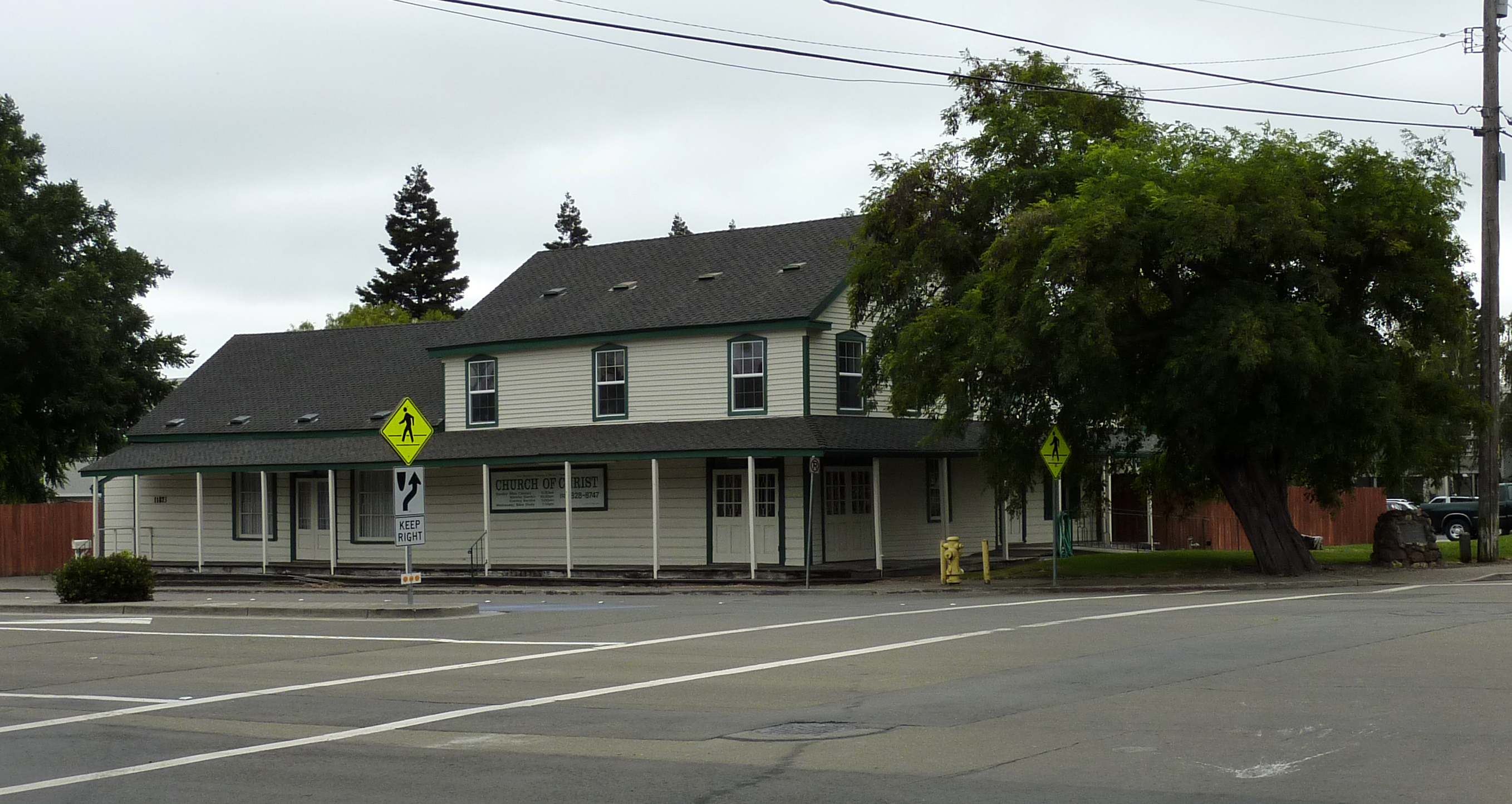
Historic Green's Store is now used as a church.

In 1835, José María Amador was granted 16,500 acres for his service as a Mexican soldier and in Mission San Jose, where he was an administrator in the valley now named Amador Valley after him. In 1850, Irish settlers bought land from Amador and founded a town.

Several historical sites are preserved and located where Dublin Boulevard is crossed by Donlon Way, itself formerly the northernmost segment of the main road to Sunol and Niles Canyon (present-day Foothill Road):

- The Murray Schoolhouse was established in 1856 with 50 pupils.
- Green's Store (opened in 1860) is the current home of the Dublin Church of Christ.
- The Dublin Pioneer Cemetery was formally established in 1859, although people had been buried in the churchyard previously.
- Old St. Raymond's Church (built in 1859) is the oldest extant Catholic church in Alameda and Contra Costa counties, and is listed on the National Register of Historic Places.

Dublin Boulevard, a generally east–west road running just north of Interstate 580, was a part of the Lincoln Highway and later U.S. Route 50. The street formerly curved southward near today's Hansen Drive to follow present-day Dublin Canyon Road toward Hayward.

In 1960, the first housing tracts were built in West Dublin, transforming the formerly rural community into a suburb. It grew steadily from the early 1960s onward as both a residential and retail center. The city became incorporated in February 1982.

Although a post office operated from 1860 to 1908 in Dougherty, which broke off from Dublin, Dublin's first post office was opened in 1963, and is still in operation today.

Dublin housed a federal low-security women's prison, FCI Dublin, until it shut down in 2024. Many employees were convicted of sexually abusing prisoners. The US government agreed to pay over $100 million to the victims.

=== MythBusters cannonball incident ===
On December 6, 2011, during shooting for an episode of MythBusters at Camp Parks, a cannonball went skyward and zoomed through a nearby residence, coming to rest in a car. Many residents were shaken and the community was shocked, but nobody was injured. MythBusters cast members Adam Savage and Kari Byron hosted a student engineering event at Dublin High School, a move to express gratitude to the community of Dublin for the access to Camp Parks as a shooting location. The Dublin Film Commission declared December 6 "Victory in the battle for Dublin", poking at the rogue cannonball incident, and announced plans to host a film festival every December 6 to honor Dublin's fallen cannonball. On December 6, 2012, Tri-Valley Film Coalition President Morgan Finley King hosted a film festival at the Dublin Library, in which winners of each category were awarded a "Golden Cannonball Award".

=== Measure M ===
In 2000, following a conflict with Mayor Guy Houston and developers of the West Dublin Hills, Morgan King and David Bewley began a ballot initiative known as Measure M. The objective of the measure was to prevent the Dublin Hills from becoming overwhelmed with housing that had been promised to voters and that the housing would not be built on preserved open space. Measure M won in every precinct in Dublin and on the absentee ballots.

== Geography ==
According to the United States Census Bureau, the city has a total area of 15.2 square miles (40 km^{2}), all land.

=== Neighborhoods ===
Wallis Ranch is a subdivision developed by Trumark Communities with about 816 units, which opened its first phase in September 2016. Trumark divided the project into eight neighborhoods, selling seven of them to other homebuilders, including Warmington Residential, PulteGroup, Taylor Morrison, KB Home, and D.R. Horton. Architects KTGY Architecture + Planning, Dahlin Group and Gates and Associates were the master plan architects. Teichert Construction built the infrastructure.

Tassajara Hills is another subdivision built by Toll Brothers, roughly 370 detached homes. Transit-oriented development around the city's two BART stations continues with the Aster and Valor Crossing developments. Valor Crossing is an affordable housing project specifically designed for veterans and their families. Avalon Dublin Station is another recently completed luxury rental development by AvalonBay Communities.

== Demographics ==
Historical population
Census	Pop.	Note	%±
1970	13,641		—
1980	13,496		−1.1%
1990	23,229		72.1%
2000	29,973		29.0%
2010	46,036		53.6%
2020	72,589		57.7%
2025 (est.)	71,602	▼	−1.4%
U.S. Decennial Census; 1860–1870 1880-1890; 1900 1910 1920; 1930 1940 1950; 1960 1970 1980; 1990 2000 2010; 2020

=== Racial and ethnic composition ===
Dublin, California – Racial and ethnic composition Note: the US Census treats Hispanic/Latino as an ethnic category. This table excludes Latinos from the racial categories and assigns them to a separate category. Hispanics/Latinos may be of any race.
Race / Ethnicity (NH = Non-Hispanic)	Pop 2000	Pop 2010	Pop 2020	% 2000	% 2010	% 2020
White alone (NH)	18,869	20,380	18,149	62.95%	44.27%	25.00%
Black or African American alone (NH)	2,995	4,214	2,740	9.99%	9.15%	3.77%
Native American or Alaska Native alone (NH)	156	164	376	0.52%	0.36%	0.52%
Asian alone (NH)	3,050	12,170	38,858	10.18%	26.44%	53.53%
Pacific Islander alone (NH)	85	277	202	0.28%	0.60%	0.28%
Some other race alone (NH)	61	141	340	0.20%	0.31%	0.47%
Multiracial (NH)	898	2,027	3,573	3.00%	4.40%	4.92%
Hispanic or Latino (any race)	4,059	6,663	8,351	13.54%	14.47%	11.50%
Total	29,973	46,036	72,589	100.00%	100.00%	100.00%

=== 2020 census ===
As of the 2020 census, Dublin had a population of 72,589. The population density was 4,766.5 inhabitants per square mile (1,840.4/km^{2}). The median age was 36.4 years. The age distribution was 26.3% under 18, 6.2% aged 18 to 24, 35.6% aged 25 to 44, 23.6% aged 45 to 64, and 8.2% aged 65 or older. For every 100 females, there were 91.8 males, and for every 100 females age 18 and over, there were 88.5 males age 18 and over.

The census reported that 95.0% of the population lived in households, 0.5% lived in noninstitutionalized group quarters, and 4.5% were institutionalized. The city was 100.0% urban and 0.0% rural.

There were 23,526 households, of which 47.8% had children under age 18 living in them. Of all households, 64.7% were married-couple households, 4.9% were cohabiting couple households, 17.7% had a female householder with no partner present, and 12.7% had a male householder with no partner present. About 16.6% of households were one person, and 4.1% were one person aged 65 or older. The average household size was 2.93. There were 18,147 families (77.1% of all households).

There were 24,426 housing units at an average density of 1,603.9 units per square mile (619.3 units/km^{2}). Of these, 23,526 (96.3%) were occupied, 62.1% were owner-occupied, and 37.9% were occupied by renters. The homeowner vacancy rate was 1.1%, and the rental vacancy rate was 5.1%.

=== 2023 ACS estimates ===
In 2023, the US Census Bureau estimated that 40.6% of the population was foreign-born. Of all people aged five or older, 50.9% spoke only English at home, 5.3% spoke Spanish, 16.0% spoke other Indo-European languages, 26.5% spoke Asian or Pacific Islander languages, and 1.3% spoke other languages. Of those 25 or older, 95.5% were high-school graduates and 69.5% had a bachelor's degree.

The median household income was $205,046, and the per capita income was $81,377. About 3.3% of families and 4.3% of the population were below the poverty line.

=== 2010 census ===
The 2010 United States census reported that Dublin had a population of 46,036. The population density in 2010 was 3,087.1 people per square mile (1,192.0/km^{2}). The racial makeup of Dublin was 51.3% White, 9.4% African American, 0.5% Native American, 26.8% Asian, 0.6% Pacific Islander, 5.3% from other races, and 6.0% from two or more races. Hispanics or Latinos of any race were 14.5%.

The Census reported that 87.5% of the population lived in households, 0.2% lived in non-institutionalized group quarters, and 12.3% were institutionalized.

Of the 14,913 households, 39.5% had children under 18 living in them, 57.8% were opposite-sex married couples living together, 9.3% had a female householder with no husband present, 4.1% had a male householder with no wife present. There were 775 (5.2%) unmarried opposite-sex partnerships, 1.0% were same-sex married couples or partnerships. About 21.5% were made up of individuals, and 578 (3.9%) had someone living alone who was 65 or older. The average household size was 2.70. About 10,613 were families, 71.2% of all households; the average family size was 3.19.

The population distribution was 10,297 22.4% under 18, 8.0% from 18 to 24, 38.2% from 25 to 44, 24.1% from 45 to 64, and 7.3% who were 65 or older. The median age was 35.3 years. For every 100 females, there were 108.8 males. For every 100 females 18 and over, there were 109.4 males.

The 15,782 housing units had an average density of 1,058.3 per square mile (408.6/km^{2}); 14,913 were occupied, of which 63.2% were owner-occupied and 36.8% were occupied by renters. The homeowner vacancy rate was 2.5%; the rental vacancy rate was 5.0%; 58.5% of the population lived in owner-occupied housing units and 28.9% lived in rental housing units.

The median income for a household in the city was $114,699 for a family was $128,737. The per capita income for the city was $44,679.

== Economy ==
Dublin has undergone significant remodeling and expansion, with almost every shopping center in Dublin being remodeled while new shopping centers continued to be built. Dublin Place and Dublin Retail Center were followed by Hacienda Crossings, The Shops at Waterford, The Shops at Tralee Village, Grafton Station, Fallon Gateway, and Persimmon Place.

Dublin is the site of Santa Rita Jail, the principal jail for Alameda County. The third-largest jail in California and the fifth-largest in the United States, Santa Rita Jail is considered a "megajail", specified to hold 4,000 prisoners at any one time, making it as large as, or larger than, many of California's state prisons. It was completed at a cost of $172 million in 1983.

The Parks Reserve Forces Training Area, historically known as Camp Parks, is located in Dublin. A subinstallation of Fort Hunter Liggett, Camp Parks is the only training facility within a short drive for the 11,000-plus reservists in the San Francisco Bay Area. Firing ranges and a wide variety of training facilities are available. The post is home to the Regional Training Site-Intelligence, Regional Training Site-Medical, and the 91st DIV Battle Projection Center. Growth is on the horizon as new facilities have been built and more are programmed for construction in the near future.

Dublin was formerly home to the headquarters of Sybase, Inc (now part of SAP SE) and is currently home to the headquarters for CallidusCloud, Patelco Credit Union, Ross Stores, TriNet, Medley Health, Challenge Dairy, and Arlen Ness.

=== Top employers ===
According to the city's 2025 Comprehensive Annual Financial Report, the top employers in the city are:

#	Employer	# of Employees
1	United States Government (including Federal Correctional Institution, Dublin)	4,052
2	County of Alameda	1,364
3	Dublin Unified School District	1,301
4	Ross Stores	1,140
5	Zeiss Meditec	672
6	Kaiser Permanente	662
7	Patelco Credit Union	474
8	Snowflake Inc.	375
9	Target	331
10	City of Dublin	321

== Arts and culture ==
The annual Saint Patrick's Day celebration includes a 5K Fun Run and Walk, a pancake breakfast, a two-day festival, and a parade. The parade is popular with residents and visitors from outside Dublin alike and has been growing in popularity each year. It is sponsored by the Dublin Rotary Club and features bands and colorful floats. The Dublin firefighters sponsor the pancake breakfast, and tours of the firehouse are popular with children. The festival continues all weekend and features food, games, kiddie rides, arts and crafts, and information about local organizations. The festival had been held near the end of the parade route in Shamrock Village on Amador Valley Blvd, but was relocated to the Civic Center on Dublin Blvd in 2007, moving it closer to the growing population in the eastern part of Dublin.

== Parks and recreation ==
Dublin has two dog parks: Dougherty Hills Dog Park, which comprises an area for large dogs, with another area for small dogs and a dog run at Bray Commons.

Dublin opened Fallon Sports Park in East Dublin in 2010. The first phase of the Fallon Sports Park includes two adult softball fields, two Little-League baseball fields, two synthetic-turf soccer fields, four lighted basketball courts, four lighted tennis courts, and a rough-grade BMX bike facility. The second lower extension was completed in March 2018. The extension added two fully lit turf soccer fields, a 90-foot baseball diamond, tanbark playground, additional restrooms, family picnic tables, and four bocce ball courts. In October 2022, the upper third expansion was completed, closest to the Dublin Fire Station 18. This extension added a cricket field, four sand volleyball courts, two Little-League fields, and multisport batting cages.

Emerald Glen Park is the largest community park in Dublin. On Memorial Day weekend 2017, the city opened The Wave at Emerald Glen Park, a 31,000-square foot facility, which is anchored by an indoor pool for year-round swimming lessons, exercise programs, and recreational use.

The 30-acre Don Biddle Community Park is in the heart of Dublin, at 6100 Horizon Parkway. Named for former Dublin Vice Mayor Don Biddle, the park features tennis courts, basketball courts, two playgrounds, picnic areas, a community garden and orchard, a garden shed, an expansive great lawn, shade structures, an outdoor classroom, and towering veterans art sculptures.

== Government ==
=== Local ===
The City of Dublin is a general law city operating under a city council/city manager form of local government. This form of government combines an elected mayor and council and an appointed local government administrator. The city council elections are nonpartisan. The mayor serves a two-year term, and council members serve four-year terms.

The mayor and city council, as a collegial body, are responsible for setting policy, setting and prioritizing goals and objectives, and approving the budget. The mayor, with confirmation by the city council, makes appointments to the city's advisory commissions and committees.

The council appoints the city manager, who is responsible for the day-to-day administrative operation of the city, including:

- Delivery of services
- Hiring of personnel
- Implementation of capital projects
- Preparation of the budget

As of March 2025, the Council consisted of Mayor Sherry Hu, Vice Mayor Kashef Qaadri, Jean Josey, Michael McCorriston, and John Morada.

Additionally, Dublin has a Youth Advisory Committee, for teens aged 13–18; a Planning Commission; Parks and Community Services Commission; Heritage and Cultural Arts Commission; Human Services Commission; and a Senior Center Advisory Committee.

=== State and federal ===
In the House of Representatives, Dublin is part of two districts: California's 10th congressional district, represented by Democrat Mark DeSaulnier, and California's 14th congressional district, represented by Democrat Aisha Wahab. In the State Assembly, it is part of both the 16th Assembly district, represented by Democrat Rebecca Bauer-Kahan, and the 20th Assembly district, represented by Democrat Liz Ortega. In the State Senate, it is in the 5th senatorial district, represented by Democrat Jerry McNerney.

Dublin has 28,798 registered voters with 12,071 (41.9%) registered as Democrats, 5,044 (17.5%) registered as Republicans, and 10,505 (36.5%) decline to state voters.

Dublin vote by party in presidential elections
Year	Democratic	Republican
2024	65.5% 17,772	29.8% 8,069
2020	72.9% 21,191	25.3% 7,363
2016	69.2% 14,312	24.6% 5,089
2012	65.4% 11,061	32.4% 5,484
2008	66.1% 11,098	32.4% 5,441
2004	56.6% 7,534	42.4% 5,635
2000	52.7% 5,282	43.5% 4,356
1996	51.3% 4,347	38.2% 3,238
1992	42.5% 4,100	31.6% 3,047
1988	43.0% 3,248	55.4% 4,187
1984	34.8% 2,141	63.8% 3,923

== Education ==
Dublin Unified School District operates the public schools, including seven elementary schools (Amador, Dougherty, Dublin, Frederiksen, John Green, Kolb, and Murray), one K-8 school (Cottonwood Creek), two middle schools (Wells and Fallon), one alternative high school (Valley), and two comprehensive high schools: Dublin High School, and Emerald High School.

Private schools include:

- Valley Christian School
- The Quarry Lane School, a non-parochial K-12 school.
- St. Raymond School, Catholic school (grades K–8).
- St. Philip Lutheran School. Preschool and grades K–8.

== Infrastructure ==
=== Transportation ===
==== Public Transit ====
Dublin is served by BART with two rail stations, Dublin/Pleasanton and West Dublin/Pleasanton, The West Dublin station began construction in 2007. The project cost $80 million and opened in March 2011. The West Dublin/Pleasanton station includes a hotel, restaurant, 210 apartments, and 170,000 sq ft (16,000 m^{2}). of office space.

Local bus service is provided by WHEELS.

==== Roads ====
Dublin is situated at the intersection of Interstate 580 and Interstate 680. No US Routes or major California State Highways run directly through Dublin, though California State Route 84 orbits Dublin and surrounding cities from its south to its east.

The Iron Horse Regional Trail, a walking and biking rail trail, goes through Dublin.

==== Airports ====
Dublin's closest airport is Livermore Municipal Airport, though the airport is a general aviation airport with no regularly scheduled commercial service. Through BART, Dublin is accessible to all three major San Francisco Bay Area airports; distance-wise, it is closest to Oakland International Airport.

=== Law enforcement ===
There are full-time 911 emergency services. Police services are contracted to and provided by the Alameda County Sheriff's Office. Fire services are provided by Alameda County Fire Department.

The California Highway Patrol (CHP) Dublin Office is located off of Gleason Drive. The CHP provides safety, service, and security to the public on freeways/unincorporated highways and on state property.

== Notable people ==
- Christopher Andersen, journalist, former editor of Time and People magazines, No. 1 New York Times bestselling author
- Catharine Baker, attorney and former member of the California State Assembly
- Alex Cappa, Offensive tackle for the Las Vegas Raiders
- Tanner Damonte, professional League of Legends player for 100 Thieves
- Phil Demmel, heavy metal guitarist (formerly of Machine Head)
- Droop-E, Bay Area hip-hop producer and rapper
- Guy Houston, former member of the California State Assembly and former mayor of Dublin
- Robert Jenkins, former NFL left/right tackle and coach for the Los Angeles Rams and Oakland Raiders
- Ted Leonard, singer and guitarist for Enchant and Spock's Beard
- Miriam Nakamoto, professional female Muay Thai fighter and mixed martial artist
- Justin Peelle, NFL tight end with the San Francisco 49ers
- Nor Sanavongsay, award-winning writer and illustrator and the founder of Sahtu Press, Inc.
- Steve Souza, vocalist for Exodus and Dublin Death Patrol
- Eric Swalwell, former U.S. representative from California's 15th congressional district
- Ned Yost, former manager of the Kansas City Royals

== Twin city ==
Dublin is twinned with Bray, County Wicklow in Ireland.

== See also ==
- Dublin, Ohio
- List of Irish place names in other countries
