= Fremont, California =

City in California, United States

- City
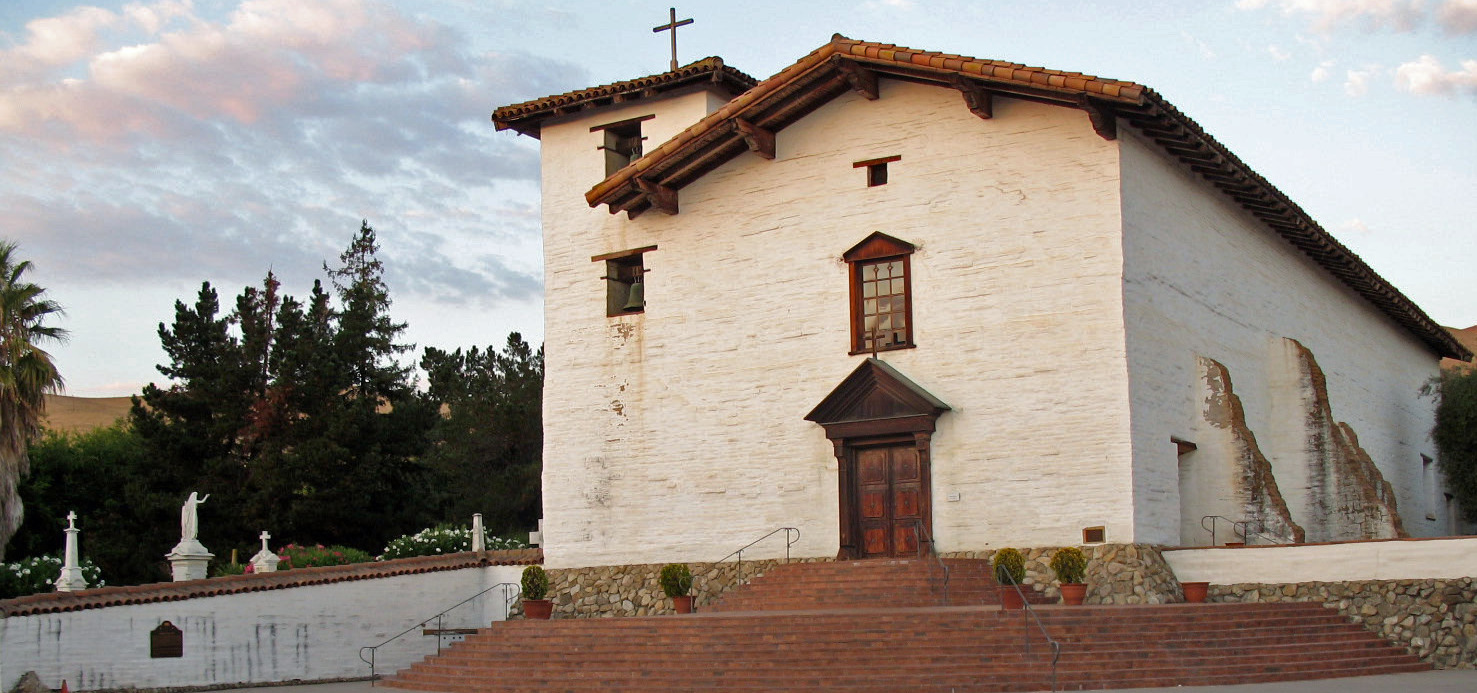
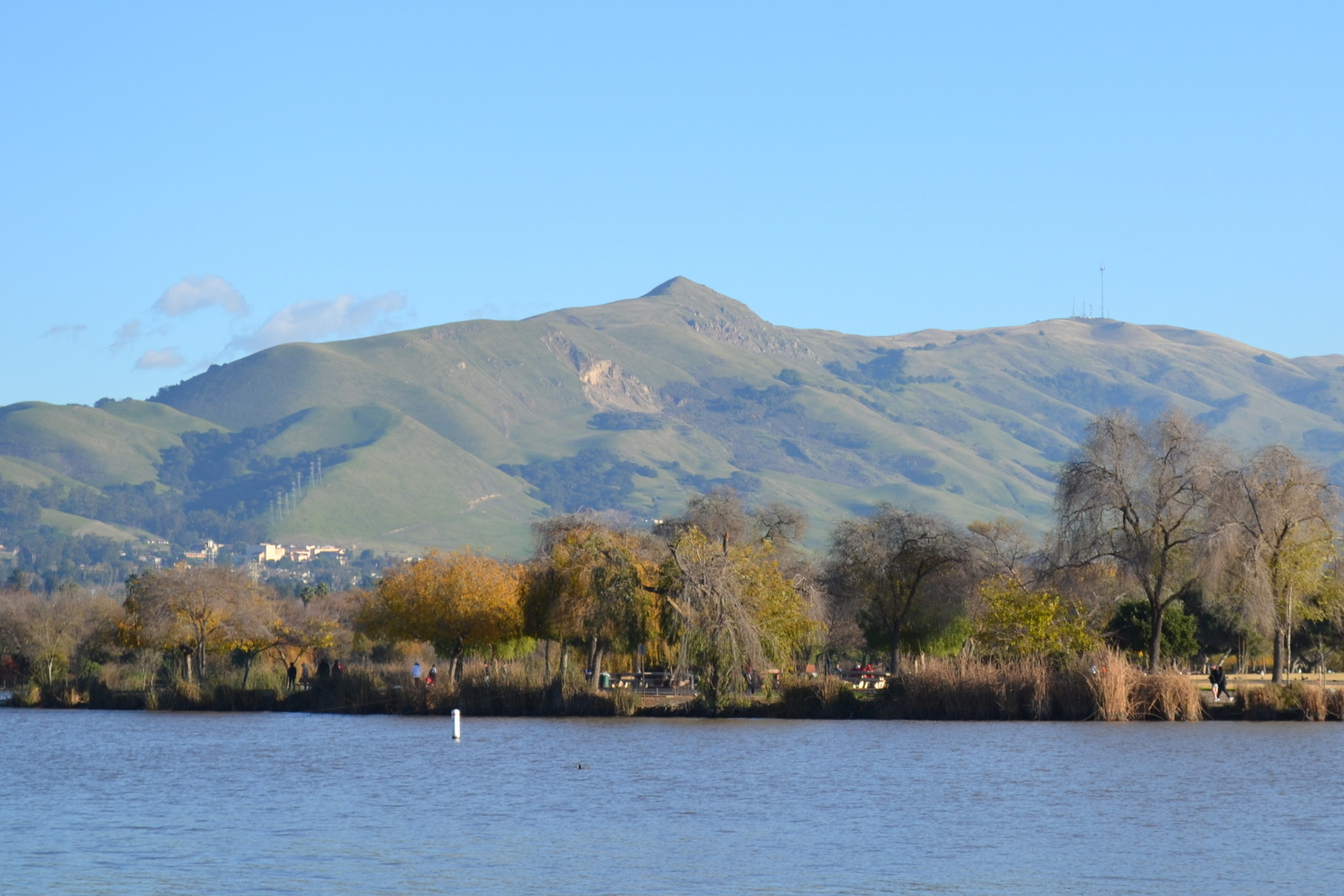
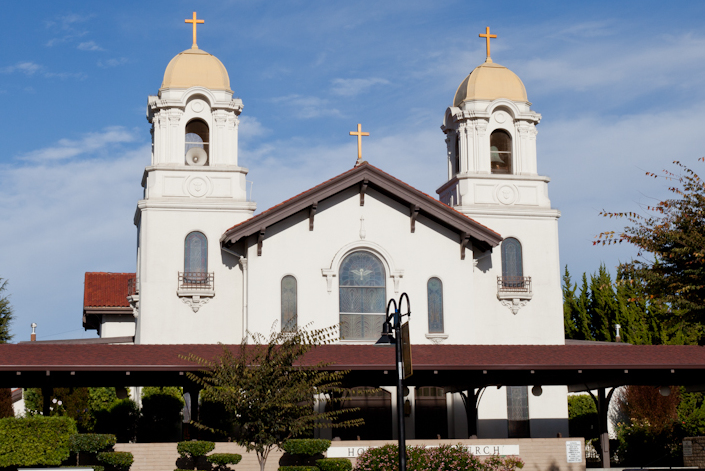
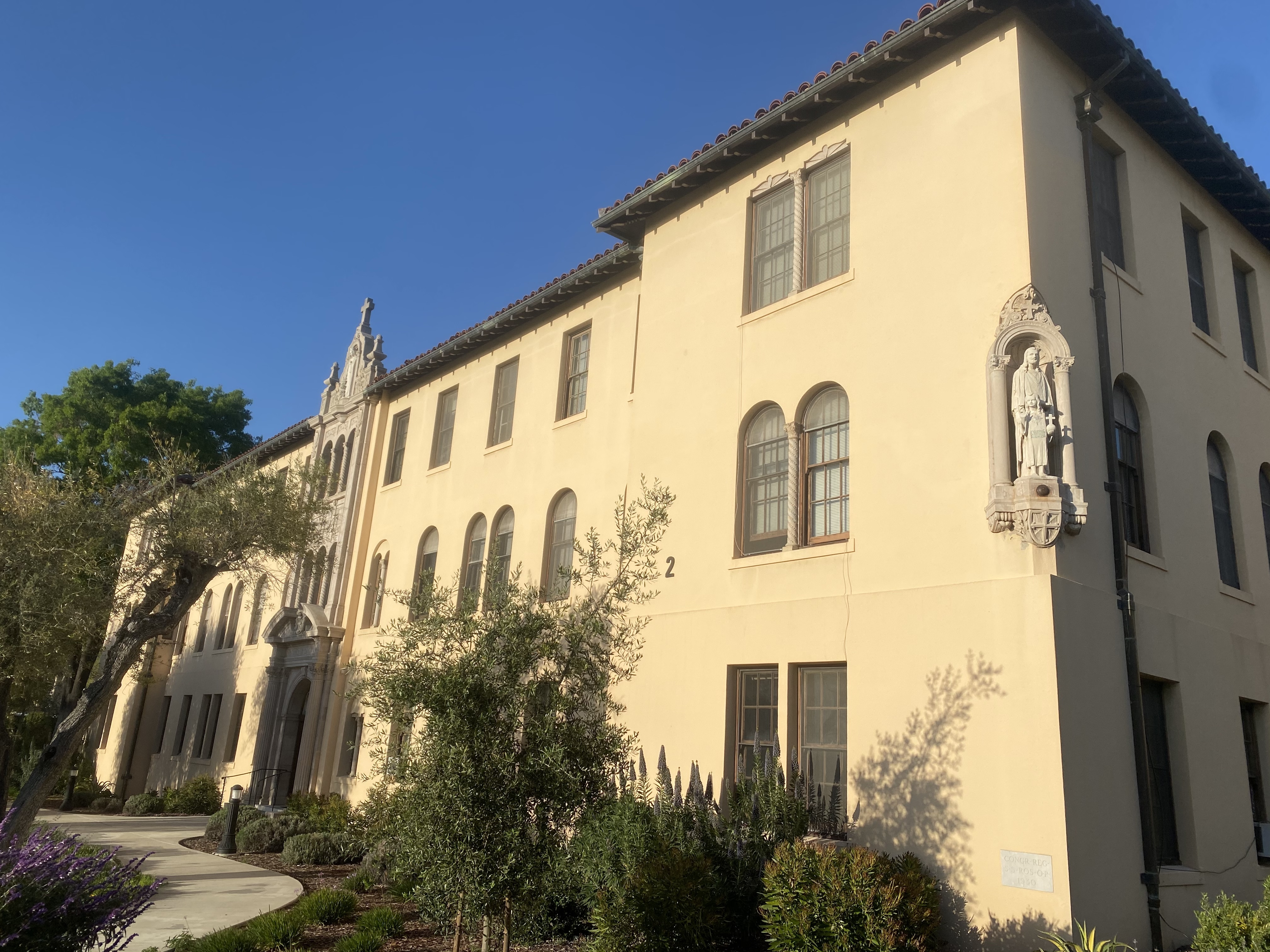
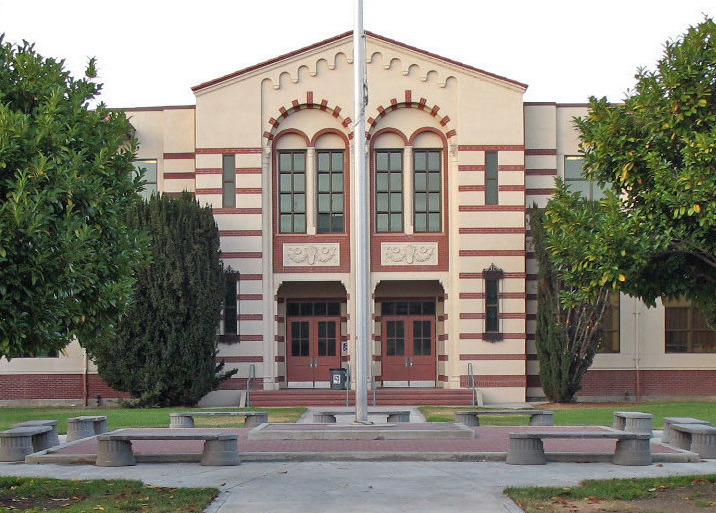
- Mission San José View of Mission Peak from Lake Elizabeth Holy Spirit Church Dominican Convent of the Holy Rosary Washington High School

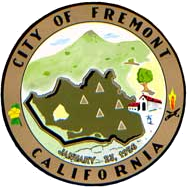
- Seal
- Interactive map of Fremont, California
- Location within the Bay Area Location within California Location within the United States
- Coordinates: 37°32′55″N 121°59′18″W
- Country: United States
- State: California
- County: Alameda
- Incorporated: January 23, 1956
- Named for: John C. Frémont

Government
  - Type: Council–manager
  - City council: Mayor Raj Salwan (D); Vice Mayor Yajing Zhang; Councilmembers; Teresa Keng; Desrie Campbell; Kathy Kimberlin; Yang Shao; Yajing Zhang; Raymond Liu
  - City manager: Karena Shackelford
  - California's 10th State Senate district: Vacant
  - California's 24th State Assembly district: Alex Lee (D)
  - United States House of Representatives: Aisha Wahab (D) and Ro Khanna (D)

Area
  - Total: 88.46 sq mi (229.10 km^{2})
  - Land: 78.31 sq mi (202.83 km^{2})
  - Water: 10.14 sq mi (26.27 km^{2}) 11.6%
- Elevation: 56 ft (17 m)

Population (2020)
  - Total: 230,504
  - Rank: 2nd in Alameda County; 16th in California; 104th in the United States
  - Density: 2,943.4/sq mi (1,136.4/km^{2})
- Time zone: UTC−8 (Pacific)
  - Summer (DST): UTC−7 (PDT)
- ZIP codes: 94536–94539, 94555
- Area code: 510, 341
- FIPS code: 06-26000
- GNIS feature IDs: 277521, 2410545
- Website: www.fremont.gov

Fremont (/ˈfriːmɒnt/) is a city in Alameda County, California, United States. Located in the East Bay region of the Bay Area, Fremont has a population of 230,504 as of 2020, making it the fourth most populous city in the Bay Area, behind San Jose, San Francisco, and Oakland. It is the closest East Bay city to the high-tech Silicon Valley network of businesses, and has a strong tech industry presence. The city's largest employer is a Tesla manufacturing plant, employing 25,000 people as of 2024.

The city's origins lie in the community that arose around Mission San José, founded in 1797 by the Spanish under Padre Fermín Lasuén. Fremont was incorporated on January 23, 1956, when the former towns of Mission San José, Centerville, Niles, Irvington, and Warm Springs unified into one city. Fremont is named after John C. Frémont, a general who helped lead the American Conquest of California from Mexico and later served as Military Governor of California and then U.S. Senator.

== History ==
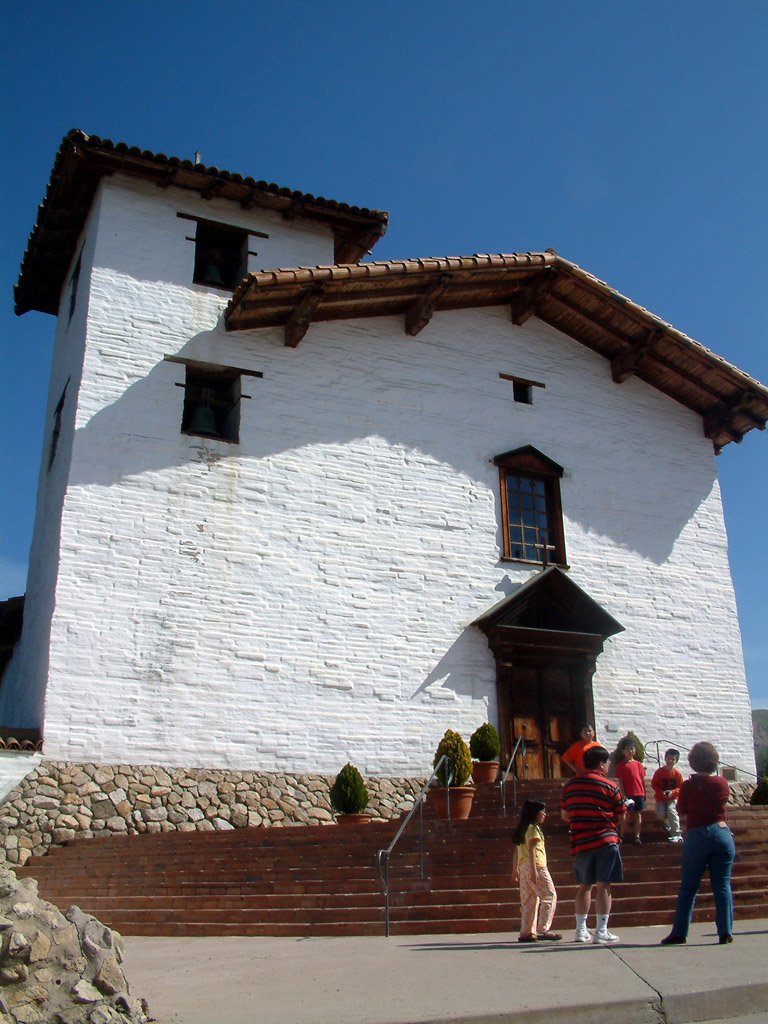
Fremont's origins lie in the community that arose around Mission San José, founded in 1795 by the Spanish under Padre Fermín de Lasuén.

=== Early history ===
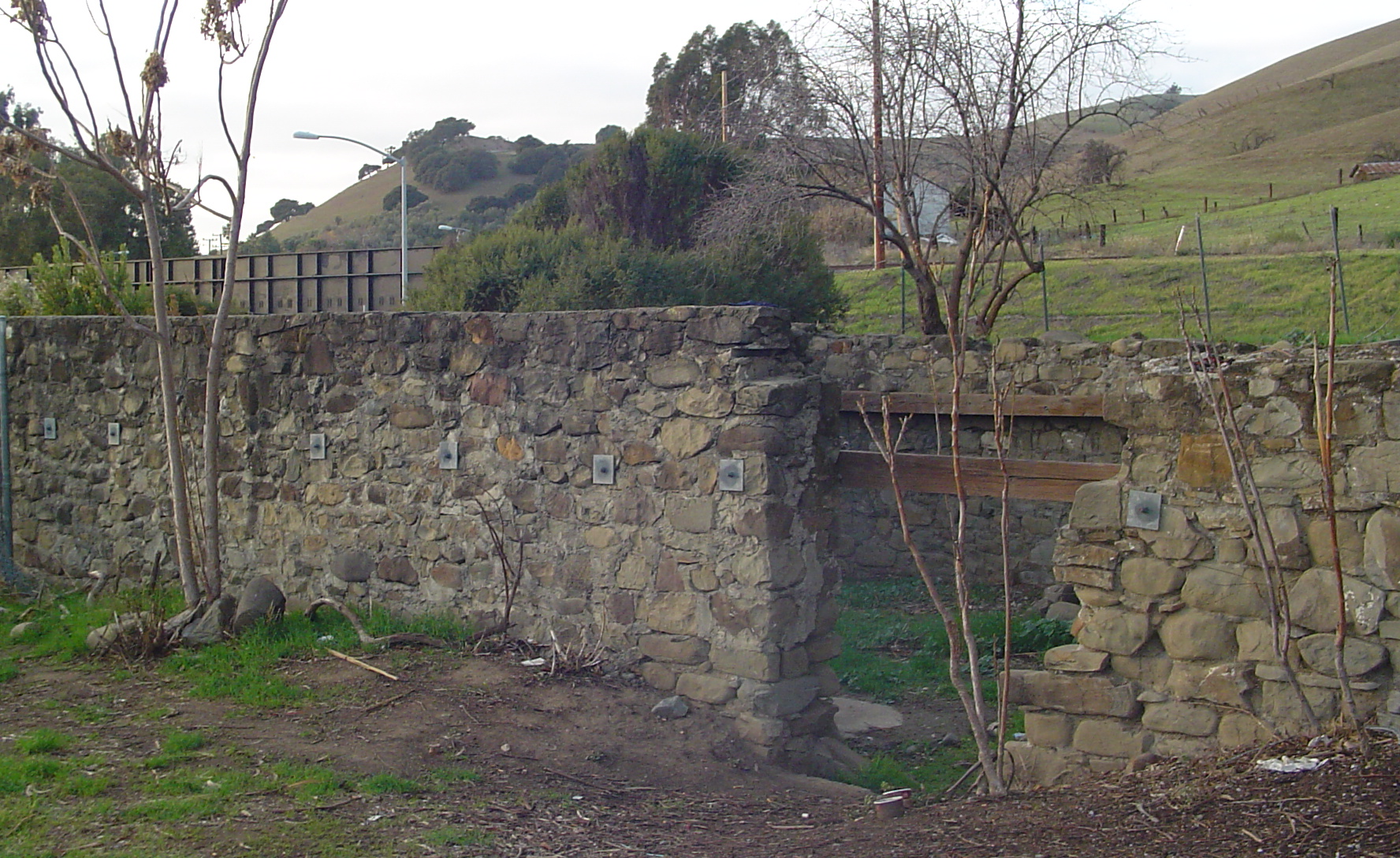
Vallejo Mill, built in 1853 by José de Jesús Vallejo

The recorded history of the Fremont area began on June 6, 1797, when Mission San José was founded by the Spaniard Father Fermín de Lasuén. The Mission was established at the site of the Ohlone village of Oroysom. The tribe lived between present-day San Francisco and Monterey and more lands eastward. They lived in dome-shaped shelters made out of redwood bark or woven tule. They were primarily hunter-gatherers; men hunted and trapped waterfowl, rabbits, deer, elk, and bears, whilst women gathered nuts, berries, and root vegetables. The Ohlone tribe lived beside rivers and estuaries because of the natural resources like fish and shellfish. In warm weather, men wore mostly nothing; in the winter, they wore animal hide or feather capes. Other than the weather, ceremonies also decided what the Ohlone men wore. The women wore deerskin aprons over skirts made of tule or shredded bark.

Until 1769, the tribe lived peacefully but Spanish soldiers and missionaries arrived in California to expand Spanish dominion in the Americas and convert the Native Americans to Catholicism. The Ohlone people weren't intimidated by the Franciscan priests, who welcomed them into their missions to live and work. Before missions, the Natives used tools made of stone, animal bones, and wood. The missionaries taught them how to make metal tools and weapons and priests also showed them how to make adobe bricks. The bricks were then used to build missions rather than for the tribe to utilize. The Spaniards brought cattle, pigs and sheep and encouraged the Ohlone to give up hunting and gathering to try farming and ranching instead. Living in the missions meant Ohlone people were forced into converting to Christianity and told to forget the superstitious beliefs that connected them to nature. Along with that, overpopulation caused food shortages and the Spanish brought diseases to the tribe, causing a lot of deaths and trouble that made an impact on a lot of lives.

On their second day in the area, the Mission party killed a grizzly bear in Niles Canyon. The first English-speaking visitor to Fremont was the renowned trapper and explorer Jedediah Smith in 1827. The Mission prospered, eventually reaching a population of 1,887 inhabitants in 1831. The influence of the missionaries declined after 1834 when the Mexican government enacted secularization.

José de Jesus Vallejo, brother of Mariano Vallejo, was the grantee of the Rancho Arroyo de la Alameda Mexican land grant. His family was influential in the Fremont area in the late colonial era and owned and built a flour mill at the mouth of Niles Canyon. In 1846 the town's namesake John C. Frémont led a military expedition to map a trail through Mission Pass for reaching the Pacific coast and to take possession of California from Mexico for the United States.

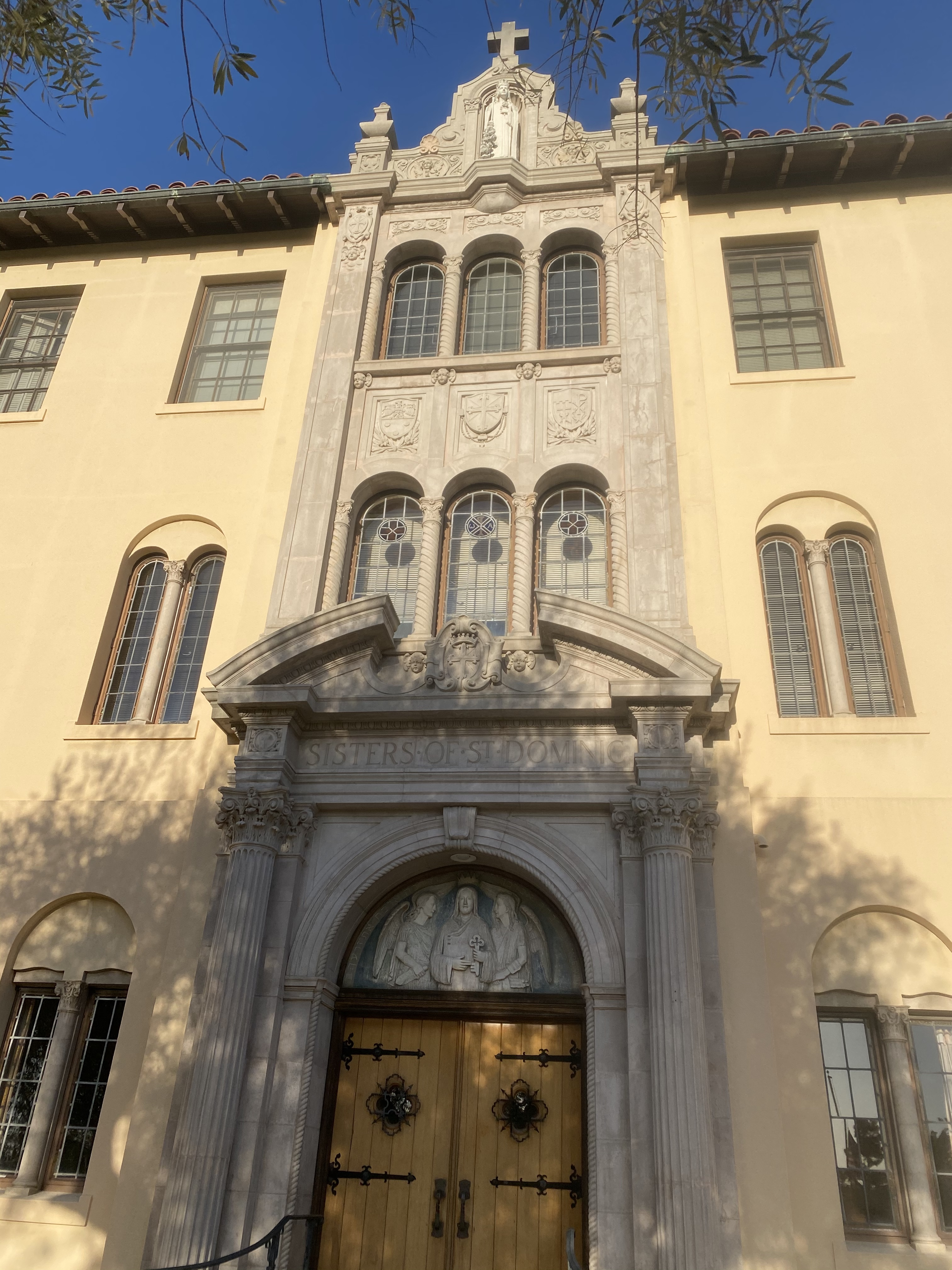
Dominican Convent of the Holy Rosary, founded in 1906

The Fremont area grew rapidly at the time of the California Gold Rush. A town called Mission San José grew up around the old mission, with its own post office from 1850. Agriculture dominated the economy with grapes, nursery plants and olives as leading crops. In 1868 the 6.8-magnitude Hayward earthquake on the Hayward Fault collapsed buildings throughout the Fremont area, ruining Mission San José and its outbuildings. Until the 1906 San Francisco earthquake caused its destruction, the Fremont area's Palmdale Winery was the largest in California. The ruins of the Palmdale Winery are still visible near the Five Corners in Irvington at the intersection of Washington Boulevard and Osgood. From 1912 to 1915, the Niles section of the Fremont area was the earliest home of California's motion picture industry (see Essanay Studios). Charlie Chaplin filmed several movies in the Fremont area, most notably The Tramp.

=== Incorporation ===
Fremont was incorporated in 1956 under the leadership of Wally Pond, chair of the incorporation committee, when five towns in the area, Irvington, Centerville, Mission San José, Niles, and Warm Springs, came together to form a city. Glenmoor Gardens, the largest subdivision in Fremont, was under construction in the area, by developers Ralph E. Cotter Jr., James R. Meyer, civil engineer Fred T. Duvall, and contractors James L. Reeder, and Robert H. Reeder. When the Glenmoor Gardens Homeowners Association (GGHA) was incorporated, in March 1953, there were no more than 75 houses in the subdivision. It was probably the first such organization in the Fremont area; in its scope and structure. The five-member board of directors (which included James Meyer and James Reeder) was set up to oversee a full range of services, from police and fire protection to street maintenance (which later became the purview of the city government).

Fremont became more industrialized between 1953 and 1962. The first Fremont post office opened in 1956. A boom in high-tech employment in the 1980s to the late 1990s, especially in the Warm Springs District, caused rapid development in the city and linked the city with the Silicon Valley. The Apple factory where the first Mac computer was manufactured was located in Fremont; production ceased in 1993. Other semiconductor and telecommunications firms soon opened in the city, including Cirrus Logic, Asyst Technologies, Mattson Technology, Lam Research, Premisys Communications, and Nextlink California. Approximately 750 high-tech companies had offices, headquarters, or production facilities in Fremont by 1999. These firms included fifteen of the top one hundred fastest-growing public companies in the San Francisco Bay Area and eighteen of the top fifty companies in the East Bay. The high-tech growth in Fremont continues today and is a major industry for the city.

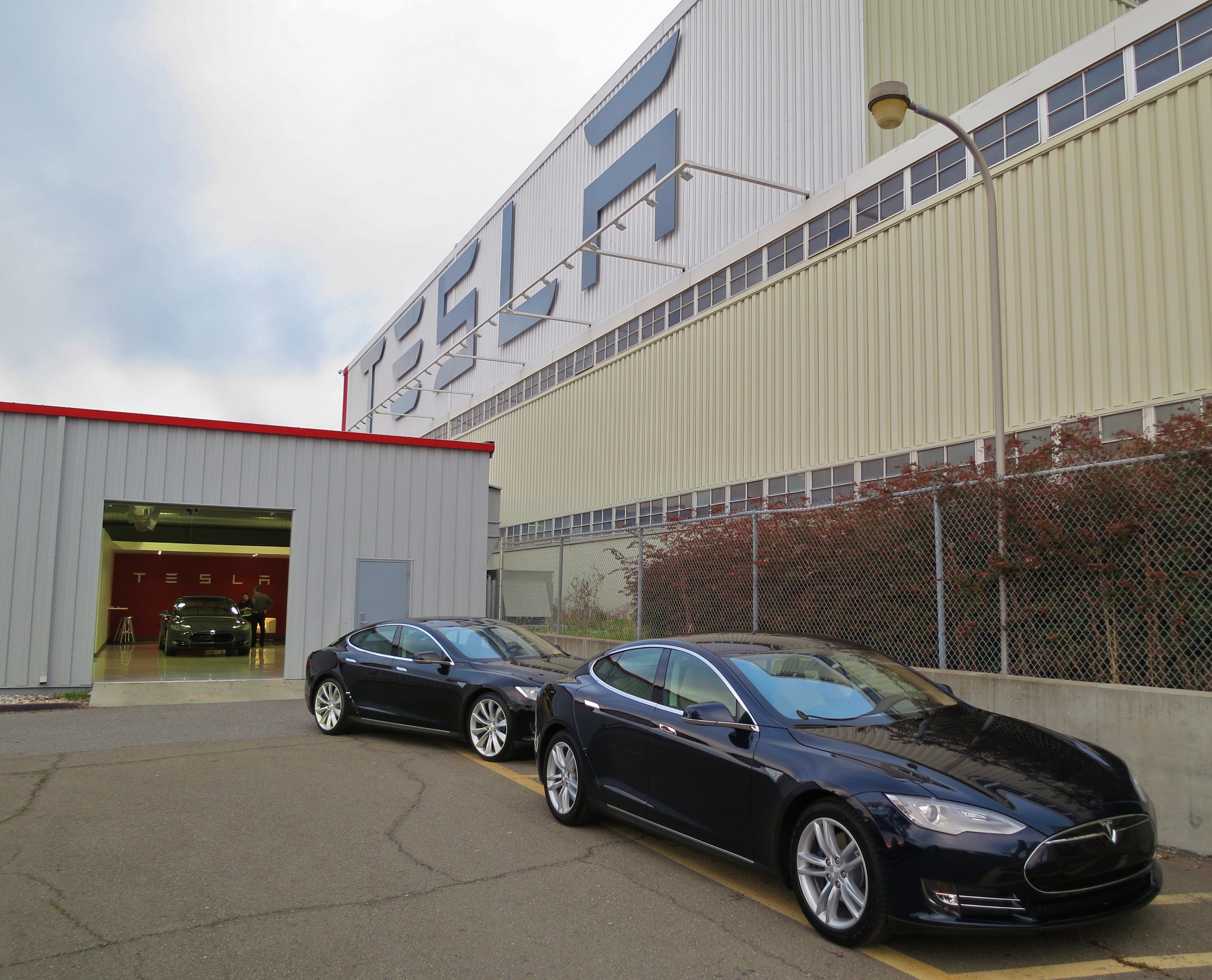
Tesla Factory (2012) in South Fremont

The General Motors automotive assembly plant in South Fremont was the town's largest employer, and Fremont was known for its drag strip. In the 1980s, the plant became a joint venture automotive assembly plant of Toyota and General Motors, and was renamed NUMMI. Toyota and NUMMI shut down its operations in early 2010. Part of the plant was acquired in June 2010 by Tesla Motors as its primary production plant, known as the Tesla Factory.

Solyndra, a solar panel manufacturer, was promoted in 2010 by President Barack Obama as a model for government investment in green technology after his administration approved a $535 million Department of Energy loan guarantee and the company built a $733 million state-of-the-art robotic facility, but in 2011 the company filed for Chapter 11 bankruptcy and laid off 1,000 workers. Data storage company Seagate Technology, incorporated in the Republic of Ireland with executive offices in Cupertino, acquired the former Solyndra building, which serves as Seagate's headquarters as of 2020.

=== Homeless criminalization ===
In May 2024, the city council began considering a "Strategic Plan to Address Homelessness" in the city, with a five-year time span, in order to reduce the homeless population. Many of the homeless in the city live in their vehicles, but the city's Safe Parking measures of having designated parking lots for homeless people to stay were seen as only a temporary solution. This led to consideration in September 2024 of new rules that would place a ban on camping on public property and the use of large vehicles like RVs in residential areas. This would include a requirement for all parked vehicles in the city to be moved after 72 hours in a location. It was noted by San Francisco Chronicle reporter Sarah Ravani that the city's previous efforts to actually help the homeless population by expanding housing options, among other methods, had resulted in a 21% reduction over the prior year in the number of people that were homeless without needing municipal punishments to be enacted.

These bans were enacted by the city council in February 2025, with additional expansions to the proposed ordinance. The updated version included a $1000 fine and a misdemeanor criminal charge with six months jail time against anyone found "aiding, abetting, or concealing" members of the homeless population. The definition of these terms was not clarified in the ordinance. Over a dozen local civil rights groups and community organizations sent a letter petition against the ordinance, noting that the camping provision effectively made it illegal to be homeless anywhere in the city and the added abetting provision made it illegal for anyone to help homeless people by providing shelter themselves. David Bonaccorsi from the Fremont for Everyone organization pointed out that the growing number of jobs in the city due to the expanding tech center had not included an adequate expansion in housing, meaning many of the people obtaining the new jobs had no housing available to purchase in the first place. The following month, the city council voted to remove the "aiding and abetting" provision from the ordinance after groups filed a lawsuit challenging the ordinance, while leaving the camping ban in effect.

== Geography ==
In 1956, five small, independent towns (Centerville, Niles, Irvington, Mission San José, and Warm Springs) located between the East Bay rolling hills and the San Francisco Bay were annexed into a single new, incorporated city called Fremont. Six decades later, these places have greatly expanded, are no longer separate communities, and are considered districts or community plan areas of the City of Fremont. The town of Newark was originally slated to join the annex, but ultimately its voters declined since Newark representatives suspected that they would become an industrial district; Newark became its own incorporated city in 1955. Later, Newark annexed a patch of unincorporated land between Mowry Avenue and Stevenson Boulevard, land which is now occupied by Newpark Mall and the surrounding plazas. Since incorporation, Fremont has created six more districts, which it calls "community plan areas" for planning purposes. These include Central, North Fremont, South Fremont, and Bayside. The two other districts, Baylands and the Hill Areas, are primarily open space.

The area consisting of Fremont and the cities of Newark and Union City is known collectively as the Tri-City Area (different from the adjacent Tri-Valley area encompassing Pleasanton, Dublin, and Livermore).

=== Centerville District ===
Centerville was formerly the main town in Washington Township. Centerville is located at 37°33′15″N 121°59′57″W. It lies at an elevation of 52 feet (16 m). Centerville was started by George Lloyd who started selling cold beer to stage passengers from a tent in 1850. Capt. George Bond set up a general store and the name Centerville was chosen. The post office opened Centreville post office in 1855 and changed the spelling to Centerville in 1893. The Centerville Pioneer Cemetery contains the burial places of many of the city's founding pioneers.

Centerville can be traced back to its native American roots. Spanish, Mexican, Italian, Portuguese and Swiss (Swiss Park), peoples were among the early settlers that contributed greatly to the growth of Centerville.

Early Centerville was a quiet farming community, which consisted of large Spanish land grants divided into smaller farms. The Freitas Ranch on Thornton Ave was probably the largest of the working farms. There were acres of apricot along with other fruit and nut orchards and large fields of various types of fresh produce.

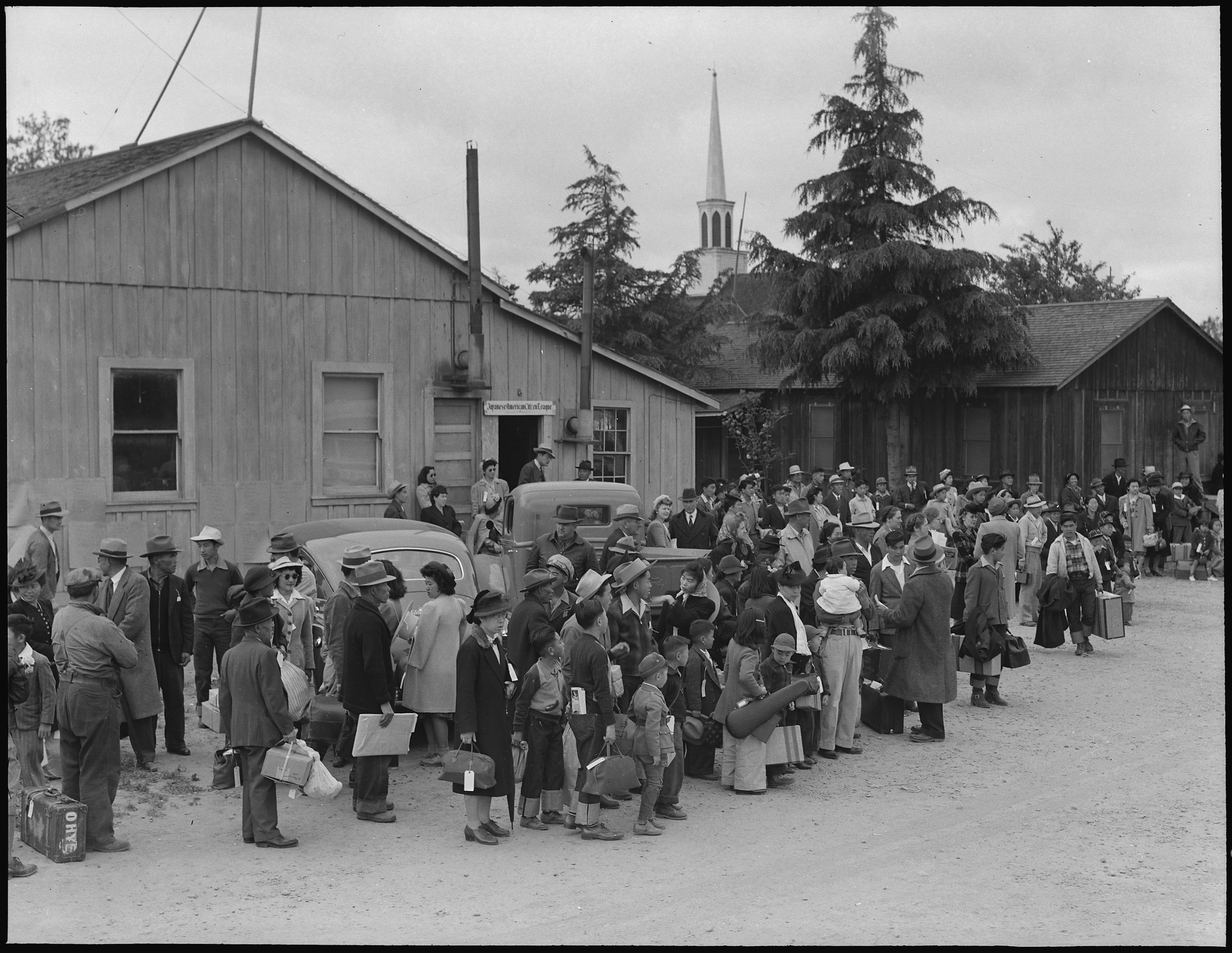
Families of Japanese ancestry being removed from Centerville, California during World War II

After President Roosevelt issued Executive Order 9066, which authorized military commanders to exclude "any or all persons" from certain areas in the name of national defense, the Western Defense Command began ordering Japanese Americans living on the West Coast to present themselves for "evacuation" from the newly created military zones. This included many Centerville farming families.

Centerville was also a main stop for the early railways. This gave the local farmers a way to quickly get their produce to market. With the access to railway service there was once a large cannery on Baine Ave. west of Fremont Ave. (now Peralta) next to the tracks. In 1959, the cannery was destroyed in the largest fire in Fremont's history. The fire lasted for two days, and effectively put an end to what had been the largest employer in Centerville at the time. The cannery was never rebuilt.

Housing developments began to appear in the area after World War II. Most of the early housing stood along Fremont Blvd from Decoto Road south to Washington High school, along Thornton Ave from Fremont Blvd west to the Newark city border, and along Peralta Blvd from Fremont Blvd to Niles.

For city planning purposes, Centerville was enlarged to encompass most of the north central residential section of Fremont, from Mowry Ave to Decoto Rd, from I-880 to the BART line. This Centerville community plan area includes the sprawling subdivisions, developed in the 1950s and 1960s, of Glenmoor Gardens, bounded by Central Avenue, Fremont Boulevard, Mowry Avenue, and the I-880 freeway. and the Cabrillo Park subdivision bound by Thornton Ave, Fremont Blvd, Decoto Road and the I-880 freeway. Also the Brookvale subdivisions, the Quarry Lakes Regional Recreation Area, and part of Parkmont. The area is served by two high schools, Washington High School established in 1892, which for a long time was the only high school in the area and American High School established in 1972. It also has two middle schools, Centerville Middle School and Thornton Middle School, which now stands on the old main site of the Freitas ranch.

=== Niles District ===
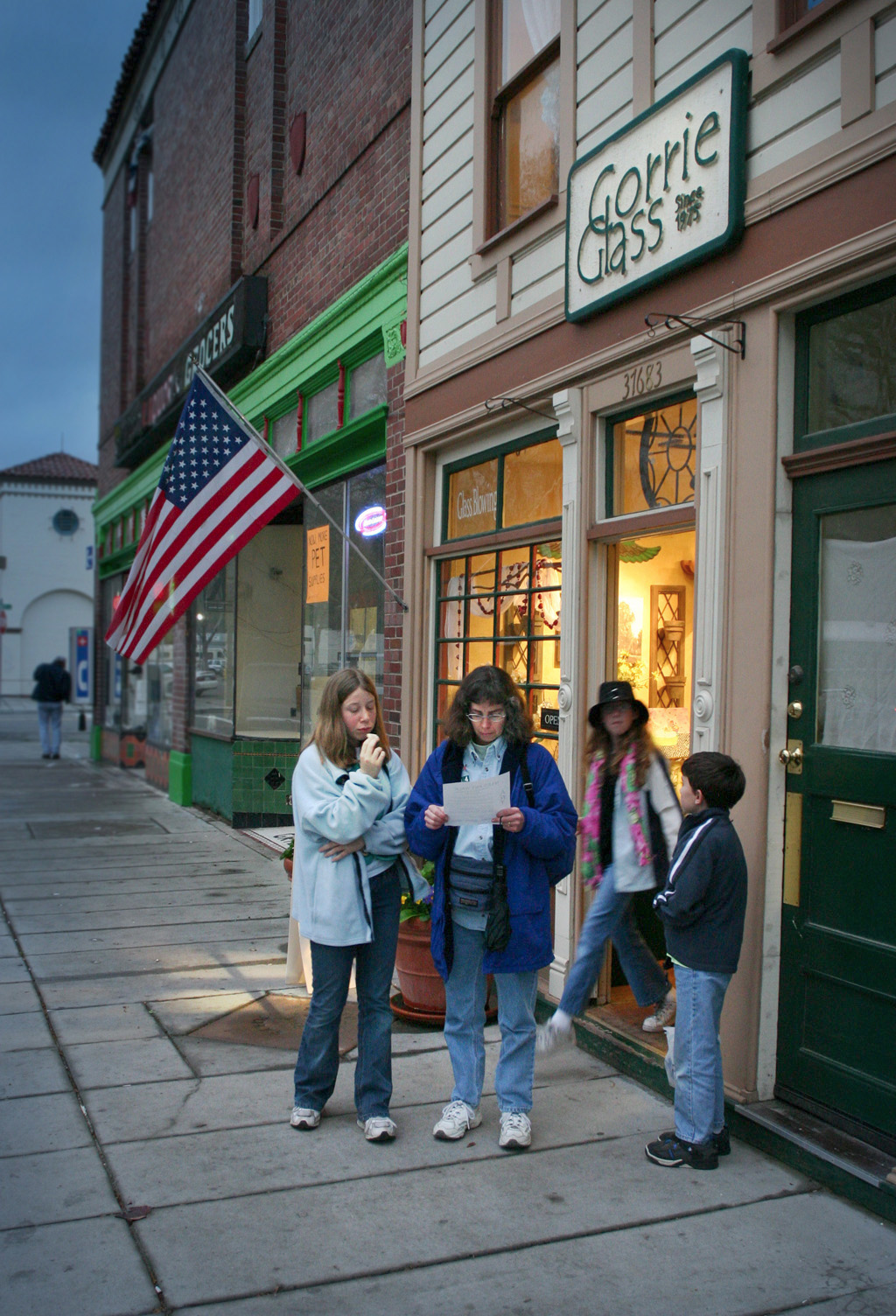
Niles Art Walk 2005

The former town of Niles is physically divided from other parts of Fremont and neighboring Union City by Mission Boulevard (State Route 238) to the east and north, Alameda Creek to the south, Union Pacific Railroad to the west and southeast, and the Quarry Lakes to the southwest. The hills of Niles are lower than those of the area south of the Alameda Creek in Mission San Jose. Old Town Niles features its own library, post office, and silent movie theater as well as a large number of antique and craft stores. Niles is located at 37°34′44″N 121°58′40″W. It lies at an elevation of 112 feet (34 m).

The community, once called Vallejo Mills, got its name from the Central Pacific Railroad's Niles junction and station, opened in April 1870 as part of the First transcontinental railroad and named after their railroad attorney and stockholder Addison Niles, who became associate justice on the California Supreme Court two years later. A post office was opened at Niles on Vallejo Street in 1873.

Niles was the West Coast home (1912–1916) of one of the first motion picture companies, Essanay Studios. Charlie Chaplin and Broncho Billy Anderson filmed some of their most famous silent movies in Niles and the scenic Niles Canyon that stretches between Niles and Sunol. The nonprofit Niles Essanay Silent Film Museum offers both artifacts of Niles' early years and, each Saturday evening, screenings of early-twentieth-century silent films, many of which were filmed locally.

The Niles Canyon Railway runs along Alameda Creek in Niles Canyon and carries passengers on weekend excursions, including a holiday "train of lights", which is extremely popular – tickets for these trains typically sell out by early October. The Niles Canyon Railroad has a small but well-maintained collection of historic rail stock.

Part of historic Niles is Mayhew Spring, also known as Mayhew's Sulphur Spring, which was owned by H.A. Meyhew and located 600 feet (180 m) north of the Niles railroad station. In September 1869, four months after the famous golden spike ceremony at Promontory Summit, Utah, the Central Pacific Railroad completed the transcontinental rail link between Sacramento and the San Francisco Bay, with trains switching at the San Jose junction in the canyon. Central Pacific then built a junction in the valley and opened it in April 1870 as Niles.

Also part of Niles is 1909 Niles Junction built by the Western Pacific Railroad, located at 37°34′35″N 121°58′17″W and situated at an elevation of 79 ft (24 m).

=== Irvington District ===
The Irvington District area, once the town of Irving, has cycled through many name changes over time. In the early 1850s two emancipated black men were traveling with E.L. Beard through California, reputedly in search of a fortune. The former slaves noticed the busy traffic at the crossroads of what is today the "Five Corners" intersection. Although now gone, there were two embarcaderos (water crossings) at this area. One of these crossings had a ferry. Realizing the financial opportunity of the area, the former slaves constructed the first building at the cross roads, a tavern with an inn. This tavern was later known as Dave's Saloon. This corner, today the intersection of Fremont and Washington Boulevards, Union and Bay Streets, is now commonly known as "Five Corners" or Irvington Square. Irvington Square's marker, Irvington Plaza park, is located at 37°31′22″N 121°58′18″W. The inn and several of the other original buildings were demolished by the city of Fremont in the early 1980s. In 1871 Washington College, the first industrial educational institution in California was established in Washington township near the crossroads. As a result, the US Postal Service established a post office called Washington Corners at the college in 1870, which became the name of the settlement on the 1878 Alameda County map of Washington Township.

In 1884, realizing the need for a proper town name, local inhabitants selected the name of Irving. The name was chosen in honor of Judge Irving, the local traveling circuit judge of the time. Later, when the railroad came through the area, the published train schedule pamphlets erroneously listed the Irving train depot as "Irvington." The town petitioned the railroad about the error. The railroad company notified the town that it was too costly for them to replace the train schedule pamphlets (over $100,000); and in 1887 following the recommendation, the people of Irving changed the town name to Irvington.

The Irvington district has two main neighborhoods: Irvington Woods and the Irvington Square. The neighborhood is ethnically mixed and is primarily working class. For city planning purposes, the Irvington area was enlarged to encompass most of the south central residential section of Fremont, from Auto Mall Parkway to Mowry Avenue, from I-880 to roughly the BART line (excluding the Central District described below). This Irvington community plan area includes the Sundale neighborhood, the South Sundale neighborhood, 28 Palms, Blacow, and Grimmer subdivisions. The area is served by three high schools: Irvington High School, Robertson High School, and John F. Kennedy High School.

The Irvingtonian period of North American mammals is named for this district due to the fossil sequence excavated here.

=== Mission San Jose District ===
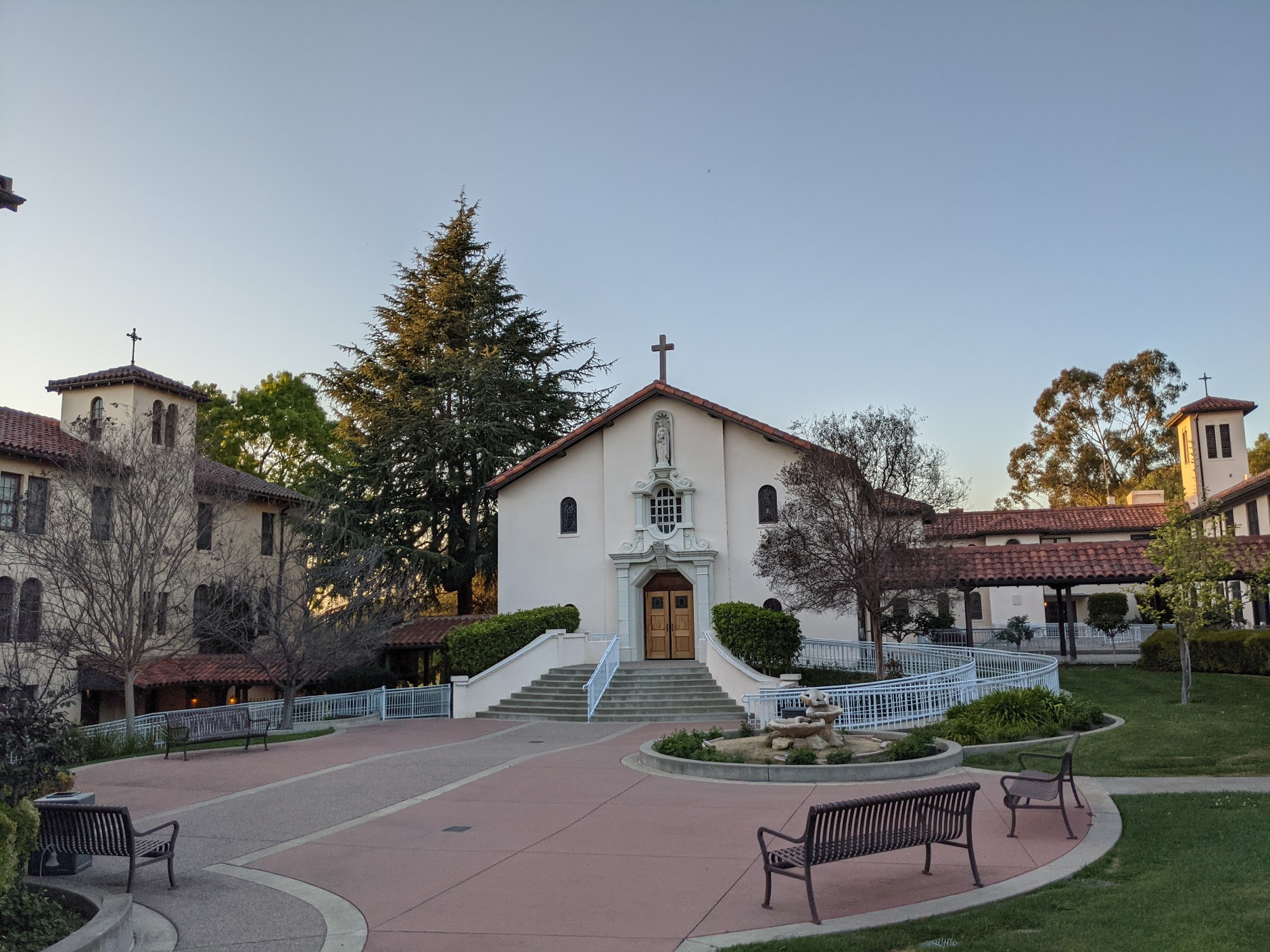
Dominican Convent of the Holy Rosary

At the time of the California Gold Rush, a boom town grew up around the old Mission, to equip and transport 49ers overland to the gold fields. A post office was opened at Mission San Jose in 1850.

The district, like Niles, is surrounded by hills. The hills are higher and steeper than Niles, with the highest points being on the Mission Ridge. Mission San Jose district lies close to the northern two peaks, Mission Peak and Mount Allison. The height of the peaks range from 2,517 to 2,604 ft (794 m), and they see some snowfall occasionally. Mission Peak is a popular hiking spot and attracts residents from all over the East Bay.

Fremont's community college, Ohlone College, is situated one block away from the mission and serves over 12,000 students.

Mission San Jose has the highest concentration of Asian Americans in Fremont – over 50% of the population as of the 2000 census. The local high school is Mission San Jose High School, ranked as the 93rd best high school in the nation by U.S. News & World Report, as well as 13th in California (as of 2024). The median family income for the Mission San Jose area (ZIP code 94539) exceeded $114,595 in 2005. Owing to an influx of professionals and other affluent families seeking access to the top-performing local public schools, Mission San Jose's median home value reached $831,000 in 2006, earning the community a rank of 237 on Forbes magazine's list of the 500 most affluent communities in the United States.

==== Mission San Jose ====
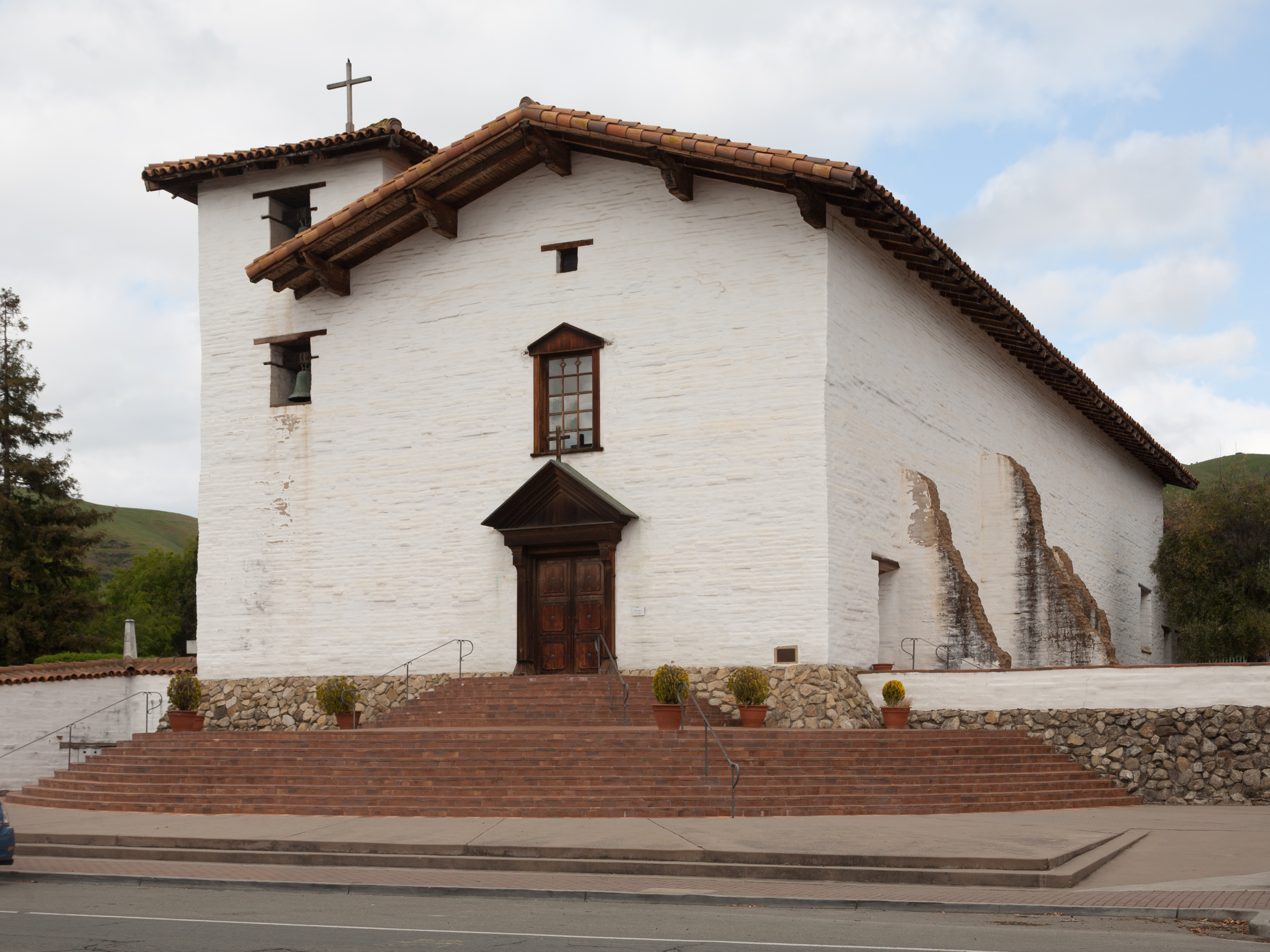
The main facade of the restored 1809 Mission San José chapel, on the National Register of Historic Places

Nestled at the base of Fremont's rolling hills is the Mission San José, one of the oldest of the Spanish missions in California, for which this district is named. The church building that exists today is a reconstruction (dedicated in 1985 for daily Mass and tours) of the original 1809 adobe church that was destroyed by the 1868 Hayward-fault earthquake. One side of the original mission quadrangle remains, housing a museum. Mission San Jose is located at 37°31′59″N 121°55′13″W; and lies at an elevation of 305 feet (93 m).

=== Warm Springs District ===
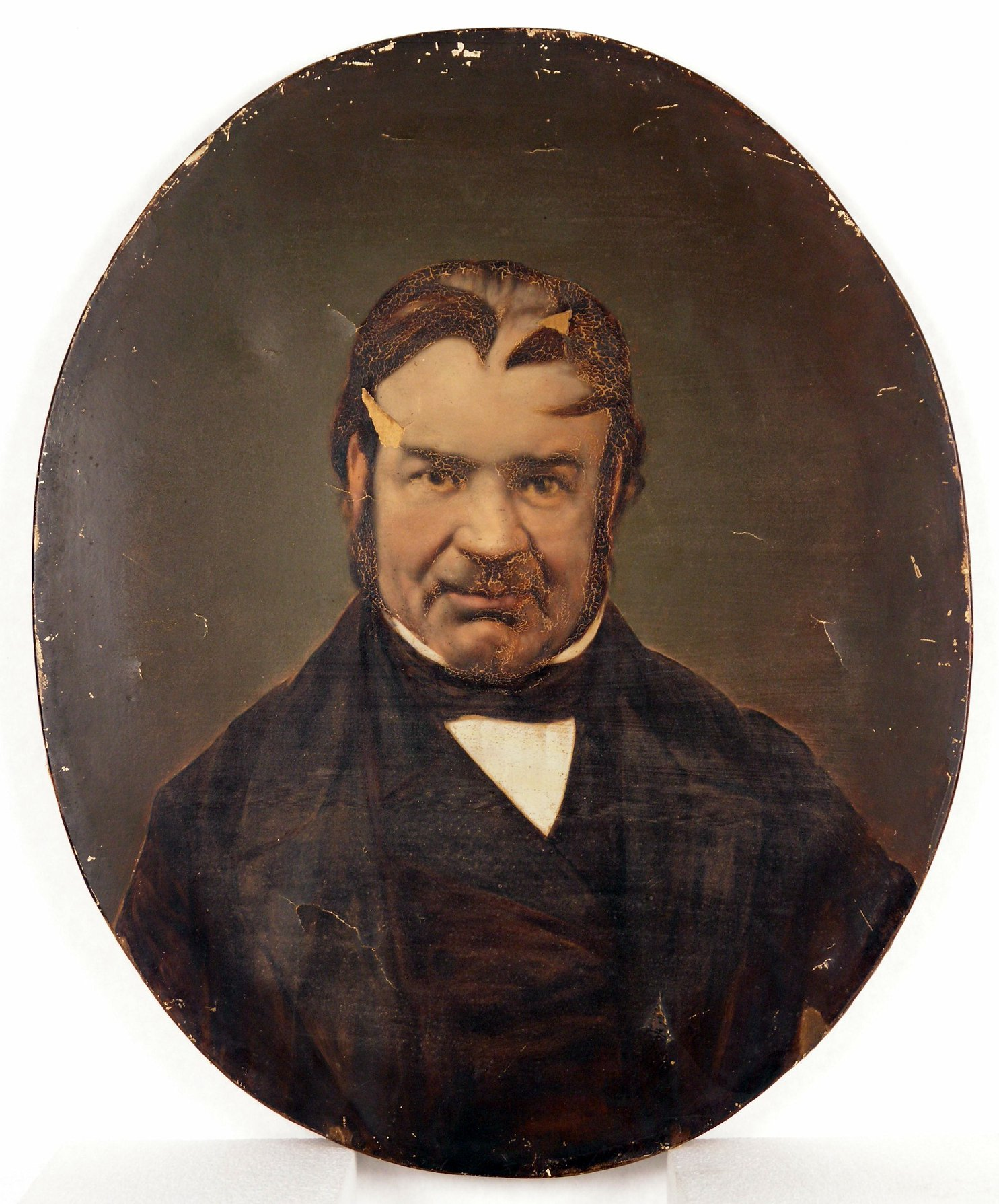
Don Antonio Suñol, owner of Rancho Agua Caliente, from which the Warm Springs district takes its name

The former town of Warm Springs is located on Rancho Agua Caliente and is so named for the springs that are located there. In early times, there was a settlement called Harrisburgh (also, Harrisburg and Peacock's) a short distance east from the small settlement of Warm Springs. A post office opened in Harrisburgh in 1865 and changed its name to Warm Springs in 1885. The name Harrisburgh commemorated Abram Harris, who settled there in 1858. The name Peacock's commemorated George W. Peacock, its first postmaster. The post office name changed to Warmsprings in 1895 and reverted to Warm Springs in 1950.

The Warm Springs district is the southernmost portion of Fremont whose hub is the Warm Springs and Mission Boulevard intersection. It is located at 37°29′14″N 121°55′45″W, and lies at an elevation of 62 feet (19 m). Warm Springs has attracted the headquarters of many high-tech companies including Nielsen Norman Group, Lam Research, Corsair and Lexar of the US as well as foreign high-tech companies such as Elitegroup Computer Systems, and Asus. The district is also home to blue-collar industry. The San Jose mission is also present.

Warm Springs also serves as commercial center for the mainly residential Mission San Jose district, especially since the construction of Pacific Commons, a large, modern regional shopping center. The Oakland Athletics talked about moving their stadium to this area. By 2010, Warm Springs was home to one of the SF Bay Area's only two coffee houses to employ baristas who wear bikinis, Your Coffee Cups, a concept that gained some controversy from Bay Area newspapers and news stations. This controversy led to the eventual closing of the business. Later, a new bikini coffee stand opened in Warm Springs called Pink Pantherz, which continues to operate as of 2025.

The BART extension to Warm Springs began construction in 2009 and Warm Springs/South Fremont station opened for service on March 25, 2017.

=== Central district ===
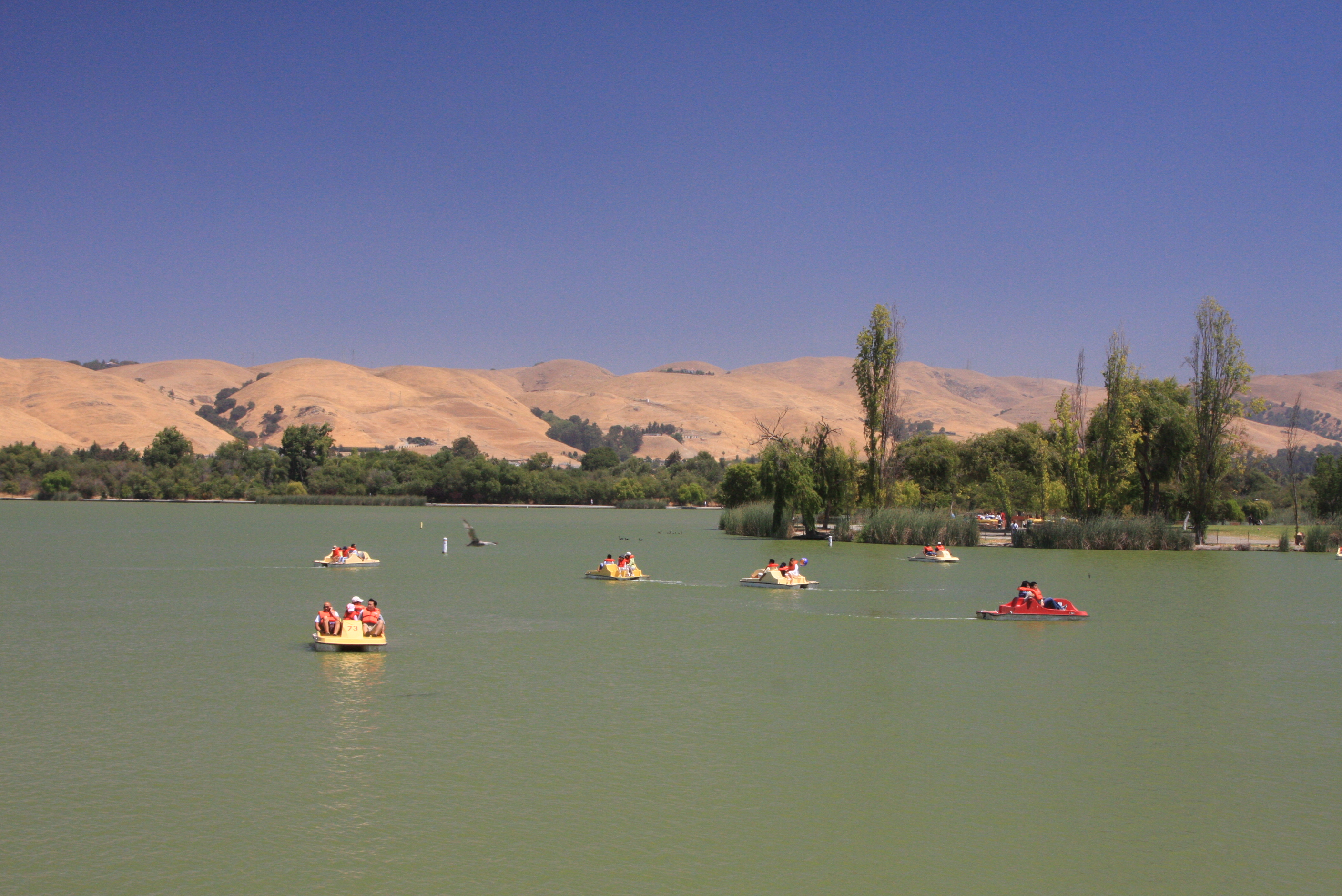
Lake Elizabeth of Fremont Central Park

The central district is surrounded by the Centerville, Niles, Mission San Jose, and Irvington communities. The central district contains retail shopping centers (e.g., the Fremont Hub), the Fremont Bay Area Rapid Transit station, health care centers and Central Park (Lake Elizabeth).

City planners envisioned and have begun to develop a mid-density, pedestrian friendly, transit oriented development, bounded by Mowry Ave, Fremont Blvd, Walnut Ave, and Paseo Padre Pkwy referred to as Downtown Fremont. To support enhanced access, one of the central streets, the Capital Avenue extension to Fremont Blvd, was completed in 2016, as the city pursues its plans for a Downtown Fremont.

Most of Fremont is part of the Laguna Creek Watershed.

=== North Fremont District ===
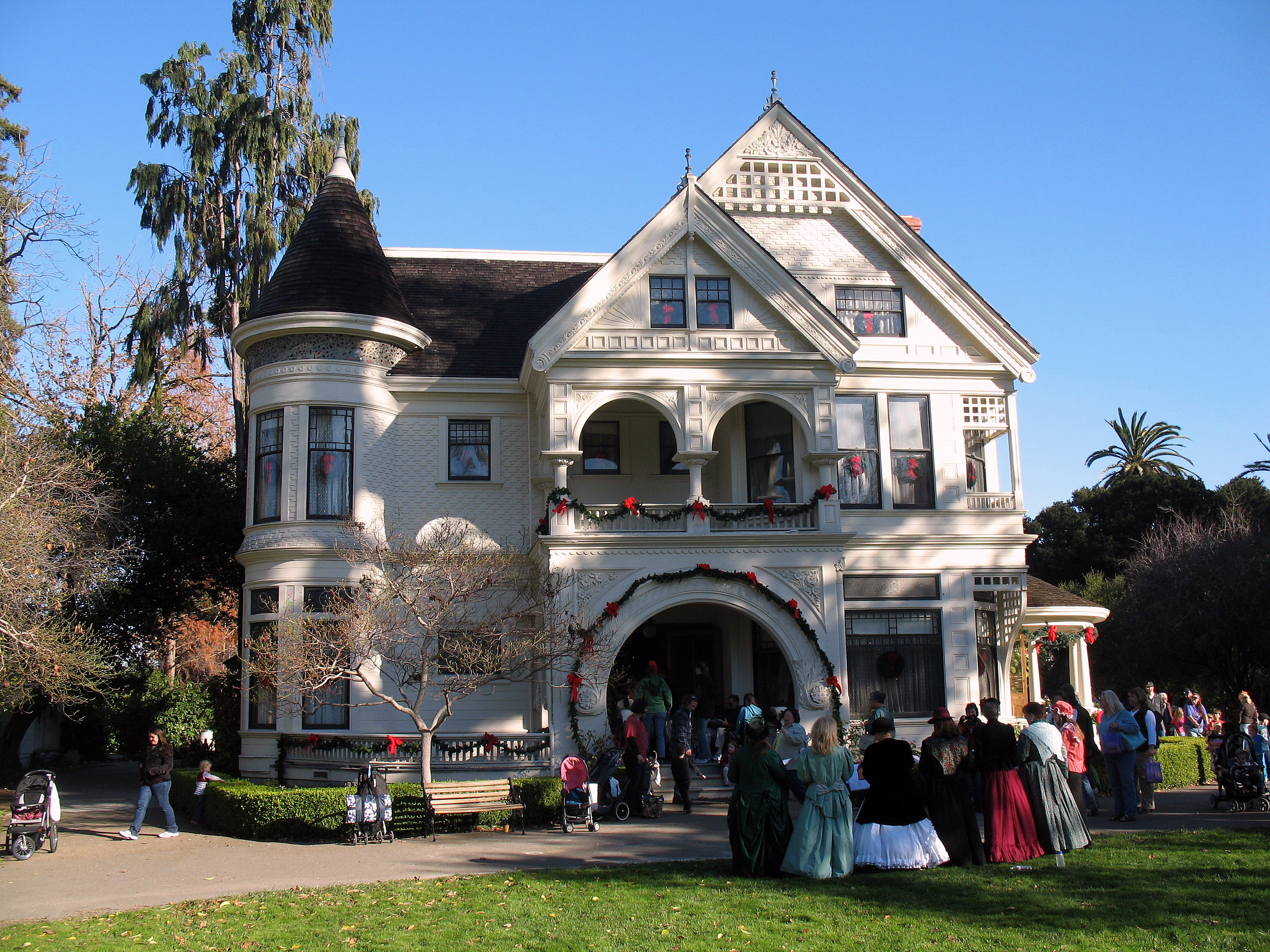
George Washington Patterson House (1857), Ardenwood, on the National Register of Historic Places

North Fremont is a primarily residential district surrounded by Union City, Centerville District, Newark, and Coyote Hills Regional Park. It is a growing community that includes the Ardenwood neighborhood, the Lakes and Birds neighborhood, and the Northgate neighborhood. It is the site of the Ardenwood Historic Farm, which has the George Washington Patterson House as one of its highlights, and the Ardenwood Technology Park. A 99 Ranch Market is one of many Asian businesses in the North Fremont District. Thornton Middle School and American High School, which are both physically located in the enlarged Centerville District, also serve as the middle and high school, respectively, for this community.

=== South Fremont District ===
South Fremont is a primarily industrial district, east of Interstate 880 and west of Interstate 680, south of Auto Mall Parkway and north of Brown Rd. The area overlaps with Warm Springs, with which it shares the eponymous BART station. The composition of the area will change, because thousands of residential units were under construction as of 2016. It is sandwiched between the Irvington and Warm Springs community plan areas. It is noted as the site of the Tesla Factory as well as the site of the Warm Springs / South Fremont BART station. In 2022, a pedestrian bridge was built from the BART station to Lopes Court. It cost $41 million.

=== Bayside Industrial District ===
Bayside Industrial is a primarily industrial and commercial district, west of Interstate 880 between Newark and Milpitas.

=== Hill Area District ===
Hill Area is an open land district that forms the eastern edge of Fremont. It is the site of Mission Peak.

=== Climate ===
Fremont has a warm-summer Mediterranean climate (Köppen: Csb) typical of the San Francisco Bay Area. This climate features warm, dry summers and cool, wet winters. Like nearby San Jose, precipitation is fairly low (about 17 inches or 430 mm per year) because the city lies in the rain shadow of the Santa Cruz Mountains to the west. The highest temperature recorded was 110 °F (43 °C) on September 6, 2022. The lowest temperature recorded was 21 °F (−6 °C) on December 23, 1990.

Climate data for Fremont, California, 1991–2020 normals, extremes 1996–present
| Month | Jan | Feb | Mar | Apr | May | Jun | Jul | Aug | Sep | Oct | Nov | Dec | Year |
|---|---|---|---|---|---|---|---|---|---|---|---|---|---|
| Record high °F (°C) | 74 (23) | 79 (26) | 90 (32) | 91 (33) | 98 (37) | 108 (42) | 103 (39) | 102 (39) | 110 (43) | 102 (39) | 84 (29) | 73 (23) | 110 (43) |
| Mean maximum °F (°C) | 67.5 (19.7) | 72.3 (22.4) | 77.2 (25.1) | 83.6 (28.7) | 87.9 (31.1) | 94.1 (34.5) | 91.1 (32.8) | 92.0 (33.3) | 93.1 (33.9) | 86.1 (30.1) | 77.1 (25.1) | 67.5 (19.7) | 96.6 (35.9) |
| Mean daily maximum °F (°C) | 58.6 (14.8) | 61.4 (16.3) | 65.1 (18.4) | 67.7 (19.8) | 71.1 (21.7) | 75.3 (24.1) | 77.9 (25.5) | 78.2 (25.7) | 78.3 (25.7) | 73.3 (22.9) | 64.6 (18.1) | 58.4 (14.7) | 69.2 (20.7) |
| Daily mean °F (°C) | 50.6 (10.3) | 52.9 (11.6) | 55.8 (13.2) | 58.0 (14.4) | 61.5 (16.4) | 65.0 (18.3) | 67.3 (19.6) | 67.7 (19.8) | 67.2 (19.6) | 62.6 (17.0) | 55.4 (13.0) | 50.5 (10.3) | 59.5 (15.3) |
| Mean daily minimum °F (°C) | 42.6 (5.9) | 44.4 (6.9) | 46.4 (8.0) | 48.3 (9.1) | 51.9 (11.1) | 54.7 (12.6) | 56.8 (13.8) | 57.1 (13.9) | 56.0 (13.3) | 52.0 (11.1) | 46.2 (7.9) | 42.5 (5.8) | 49.9 (9.9) |
| Mean minimum °F (°C) | 32.9 (0.5) | 34.9 (1.6) | 37.9 (3.3) | 40.5 (4.7) | 45.8 (7.7) | 49.1 (9.5) | 52.5 (11.4) | 53.5 (11.9) | 49.3 (9.6) | 44.1 (6.7) | 37.0 (2.8) | 31.7 (−0.2) | 30.6 (−0.8) |
| Record low °F (°C) | 26 (−3) | 31 (−1) | 34 (1) | 34 (1) | 41 (5) | 46 (8) | 48 (9) | 46 (8) | 46 (8) | 40 (4) | 32 (0) | 27 (−3) | 26 (−3) |
| Average precipitation inches (mm) | 3.00 (76) | 3.17 (81) | 2.52 (64) | 1.22 (31) | 0.50 (13) | 0.16 (4.1) | 0.00 (0.00) | 0.02 (0.51) | 0.10 (2.5) | 0.69 (18) | 1.59 (40) | 2.97 (75) | 15.94 (405) |
| Average precipitation days | 9.9 | 9.5 | 9.6 | 5.9 | 3.1 | 0.9 | 0.0 | 0.3 | 0.7 | 2.9 | 7.0 | 10.3 | 60.1 |
Source 1: NOAA
Source 2: National Weather Service (mean maxima/minima 2006–2020)

== Demographics ==
Historical population
| Census | Pop. | Note | %± |
|---|---|---|---|
| 1960 | 43,790 | | — |
| 1970 | 100,869 | | 130.3% |
| 1980 | 131,945 | | 30.8% |
| 1990 | 173,339 | | 31.4% |
| 2000 | 203,413 | | 17.3% |
| 2010 | 214,089 | | 5.2% |
| 2020 | 230,504 | | 7.7% |
| 2025 (est.) | 226,442 | ▼ | −1.8% |
U.S. Decennial Census; 1860–1870 1880-1890; 1900 1910 1920; 1930 1940 1950; 1960 1970 1980; 1990 2000 2010; 2020

=== 2020 ===
Fremont city, California – Racial composition Note: the US Census treats Hispanic/Latino as an ethnic category. This table excludes Latinos from the racial categories and assigns them to a separate category. Hispanics/Latinos may be of any race.
| Race (NH = Non-Hispanic) | 2020 | 2010 | 2000 | 1990 | 1980 |
|---|---|---|---|---|---|
| White alone (NH) | 16.6% (38,160) | 26.5% (56,766) | 41.4% (84,149) | 63.5% (110,131) | 75.9% (100,181) |
| Black alone (NH) | 2.2% (5,108) | 3.2% (6,743) | 3% (6,084) | 3.6% (6,279) | 2.5% (3,292) |
| American Indian alone (NH) | 0.2% (470) | 0.2% (458) | 0.3% (656) | 0.6% (965) | 0.6% (805) |
| Asian alone (NH) | 63.7% (146,875) | 50.3% (107,679) | 36.8% (74,773) | 18.8% (32,565) | 6.8% (8,987) |
| Pacific Islander alone (NH) | 0.4% (967) | 0.5% (1,064) | 0.4% (736) | | |
| Other race alone (NH) | 0.6% (1,315) | 0.2% (388) | 0.3% (553) | 0.2% (308) | 0.2% (316) |
| Multiracial (NH) | 3.7% (8,593) | 4.3% (9,293) | 4.5% (9,053) | — | — |
| Hispanic/Latino (any race) | 12.6% (29,016) | 14.8% (31,698) | 13.5% (27,409) | 13.3% (23,091) | 13.9% (18,364) |

According to the census estimate, the median income for a household in the city from 2020 to 2024 (in 2024 dollars) was $181,506. About 4.5% of the population were below the poverty line, including 5.9% of those under age 18 and 6.2% of those age 65 or over. The most reported detailed ancestries were Indian (29.3%), Chinese (19.1%), Mexican (9.1%), Filipino (6.9%), English (4.9%), and German (4.8%).

=== 2010 ===
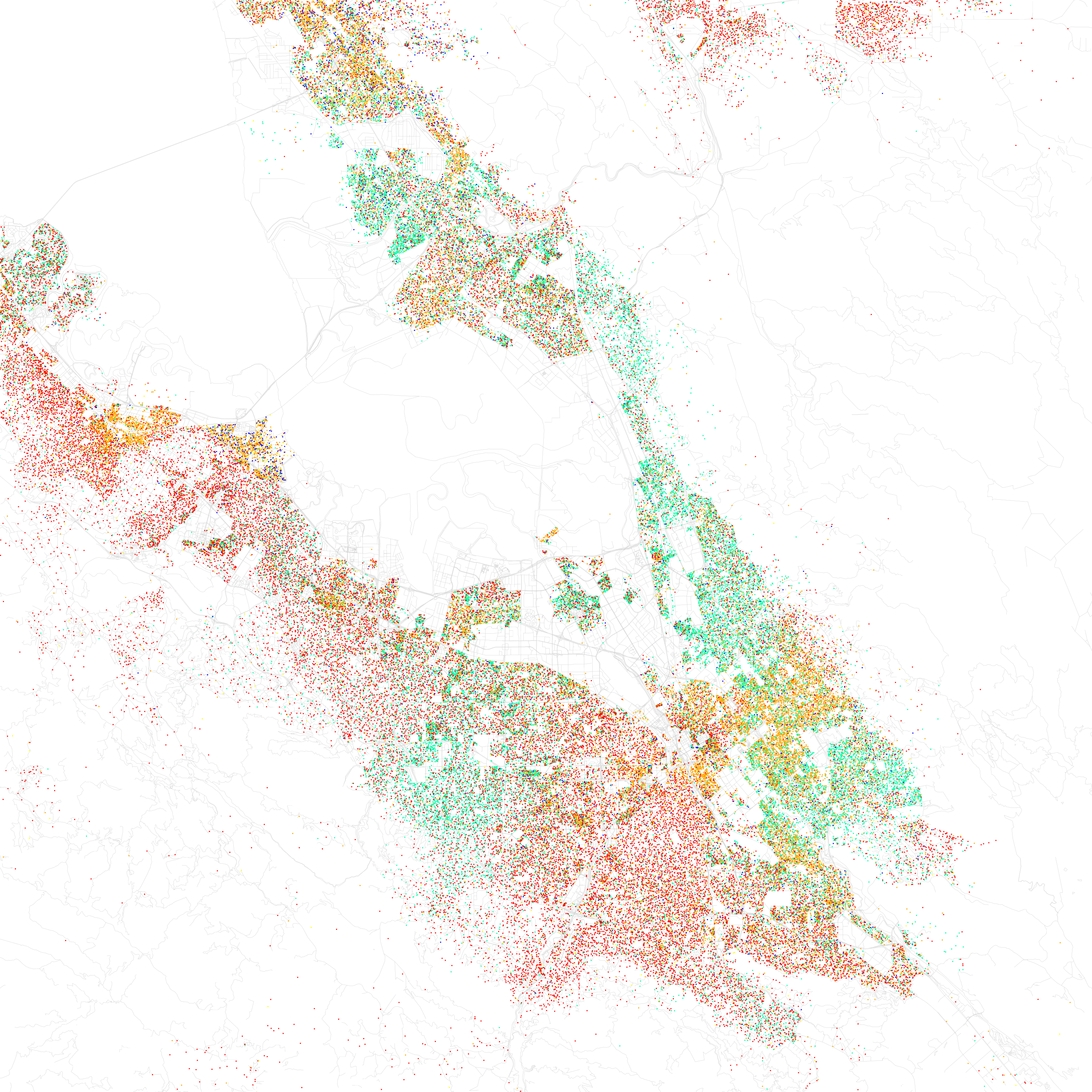
Map of racial distribution in the southern San Francisco Bay Area, 2010 U.S. Census. Each dot is 25 people: ⬤ White ⬤ Black ⬤ Asian ⬤ Hispanic ⬤ Other

The 2010 United States census reported that Fremont had a population of 214,089. The population density was 2,443.7 inhabitants per square mile (943.5/km^{2}).

The Census reported that 212,438 people (99.2% of the population) lived in households, 969 (0.5%) lived in non-institutionalized group quarters, and 682 (0.3%) were institutionalized.

There were 71,004 households, out of which 31,070 (43.8%) had children under the age of 18 living in them, 45,121 (63.5%) were opposite-sex married couples living together, 7,070 (10.0%) had a female householder with no husband present, 3,382 (4.8%) had a male householder with no wife present. There were 2,779 (3.9%) unmarried opposite-sex partnerships, and 444 (0.6%) same-sex married couples or partnerships. 11,576 households (16.3%) were made up of individuals, and 3,697 (5.2%) had someone living alone who was 65 years of age or older. The average household size was 2.99. There were 55,573 families (78.3% of all households); the average family size was 3.36.

The population was spread out, with 53,216 people (24.9%) under the age of 18, 15,610 people (7.3%) aged 18 to 24, 66,944 people (31.3%) aged 25 to 44, 56,510 people (26.4%) aged 45 to 64, and 21,809 people (10.2%) who were 65 years of age or older. The median age was 36.8 years. For every 100 females, there were 98.9 males. For every 100 females age 18 and over, there were 96.4 males.

There were 73,989 housing units at an average density of 844.5 units per square mile (326.1 units/km^{2}), of which 71,004 were occupied, of which 44,463 (62.6%) were owner-occupied, and 26,541 (37.4%) were occupied by renters. The homeowner vacancy rate was 1.3%; the rental vacancy rate was 4.5%. 136,606 people (63.8% of the population) lived in owner-occupied housing units and 75,832 people (35.4%) lived in rental housing units.

Fremont has a large Deaf community, in large part because it is home of the Northern California campus of the California School for the Deaf. The school district is called the Fremont Unified School District which also serves parts of Union City and Hayward.

== Economy ==
Companies headquartered in Fremont include Antec Inc, Electronics for Imaging, Ikanos Communications, Lam Research, Seagate Technology, Fremont Bank, Nielsen Norman Group, Oplink Communications, SYNNEX, S3 Graphics, Tailored Brands and DCKAP.

=== Top employers ===
According to the city's June 2024 Annual Comprehensive Financial Report, the top employers in the city are:

| # | Employer | # of Employees |
|---|---|---|
| 1 | Tesla, Inc. | 25,000 |
| 2 | Lam Research | 4,000 |
| 3 | Washington Hospital | 2,400 |
| 4 | Kaiser Permanente | 1,600 |
| 5 | Synnex | 1,400 |
| 6 | Western Digital | 1,100 |
| 7 | City of Fremont | 1,000 |
| 8 | Fremont Unified School District | 800 |
| 9 | Boehringer Ingelheim | 800 |
| 10 | Sutter Health | 775 |

== Culture and recreation ==
The City of Fremont has been a Tree City USA since 1996. There are approximately 55,000 trees in city parks, streets, and landscaped boulevard areas. The city operates the Olive Hyde Art Gallery, adjacent to Mission San Jose, which has featured Bay Area artists such as Wendy Yoshimura, the California Society of Printmakers and the Etsy collective. The public gallery is housed in a former home of Olive Hyde, a descendant of early San Francisco Mayor George Hyde.

Other cultural, historical, or scientific landmarks include: Fremont Central Park and Lake Elizabeth, Ardenwood Historic Farm, California Nursery Historical Park, Don Edwards National Wildlife Refuge, Mission Peak Regional Preserve, Niles Essanay Silent Film Museum, Washington Township Museum of Local History, Quarry Lakes Regional Recreation Area, Shinn Park and Arboretum, and Coyote Hills Regional Park.

=== Media ===
Founded in 2002, the Tri-City Voice serves Fremont and the nearby cities of Union City and Newark. The weekly is based in the Fremont, and publishes the city's legal notices.

== Government ==
An elected mayor heads Fremont city government for a four-year term. The mayor chairs the city council, which has four elected council members in addition to the mayor. Two new seats have been added to the council beginning in 2018, for a total of seven seats when district-based elections are phased in. The council adopts the city's budget, and decides major policies. The city council appoints a city manager and city attorney. The city manager hires city staff and manages day-to-day business. Advisory bodies work with the city council on some issues, to facilitate the council's final decisions. The mayor appoints advisory body members, subject to the approval of a majority of the council. Most members serve four-year terms of office without pay, with the exception of planning commissioners.

The City of Fremont directly provides services related to public safety, land use regulation, infrastructure maintenance, parks and recreation, and local social services. To provide these services, the city government is organized into 22 departments, from Animal Services to Transportation Engineering.

According to a 2009 financial report, city revenues were $280 million, expenditures $200 million, assets $1,200 million, cash and investments $340 million, and liabilities $260 million. As of 2015, the annual budget was $160 million and the city had 800 employees.

The city council has adopted a balanced budget by July 1 of each year. Budget problems have in some past years involved cuts in services, reductions in city staffing and wage concessions by labor unions.

Special districts provide water and sewer services for the city: Alameda County Water District and Union Sanitary District. A private contractor, Allied Waste (now Republic Services), provides garbage collection and recycling services to the city.

=== Grand jury investigation of record-keeping ===
In 2015, a grand jury found that the city government did not comply with state law on public records, by deleting most emails after 30 days instead of the required two years. All emails were automatically labeled as "unsaved drafts" unless manually designated for retention. The city did not keep any record of councilmember emails, which used fremont.gov addresses and were relayed on to councilmembers' private email accounts. Though city officials held that automatic deletion would reduce data storage costs, the grand jury determined that the cost of complying with the state law would not be significant.

=== District-based elections ===
The city phased in district-based instead of at-large elections for all but one seat on the city council, beginning in November 2018. Two new seats were added, from five seats to seven. Six of the seats required residence inside a district, while the seat held by the mayor remained at large. The council chose the new district boundaries in June 2017, a controversial vote that drew accusations of gerrymandering to favor two of the incumbents.

The districting was forced by the threat of a legal action from a group claiming that Latino minorities who were 14 percent of the population had not been adequately represented. Few or no Latinos were elected to the council during 1956–2017. Some claimed that the results of precinct voting may have been polarized along racial lines.

=== Politics ===
According to the California Secretary of State, as of February 20, 2024, the city of Fremont has 118,717 registered voters. Of those, 59,594 (50.19%) are registered Democrats, 17,021 (14.34%) are registered Republicans, and 37,095 (31.24%) have declined to state a political party.

== Education ==
=== Primary and secondary schools ===
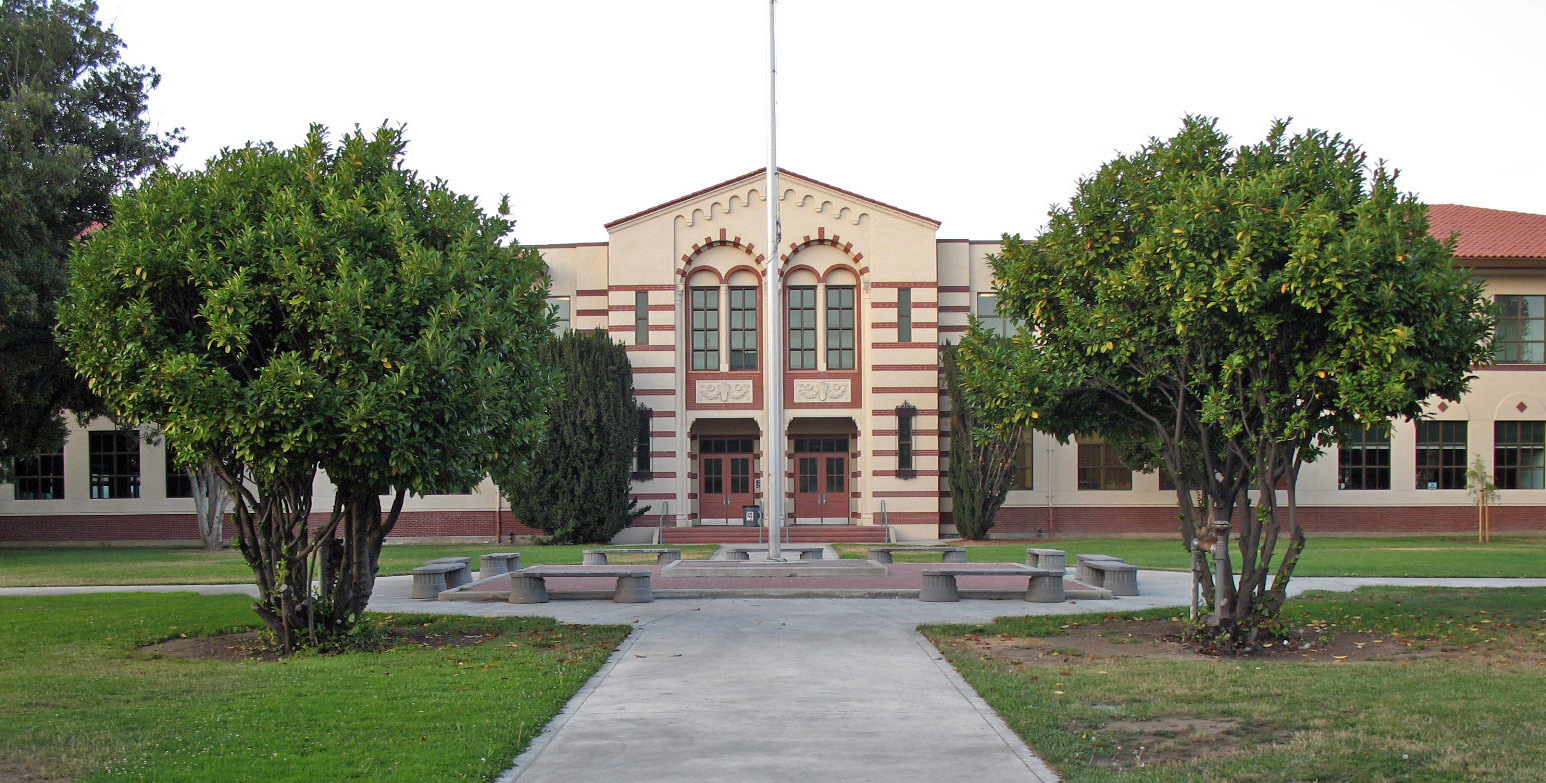
Washington, the oldest high school in Fremont, on the National Register

The Fremont Unified School District has five high schools for grades 9–12: American, Irvington, Kennedy, Mission San Jose and Washington. The 5,000 seat Tak Fudenna Stadium serves all five high schools as a venue for football, track, soccer and high school graduation ceremonies. These five high schools, along with James Logan High School in Union City and Newark Memorial High School in Newark, make up the Mission Valley Athletic League (M.V.A.L.).

The district has a continuation high school (Robertson); two independent study programs (Vista and COIL); an adult school; five middle schools for grades 6–8 (Centerville, Hopkins, Horner, Thornton and Walters); and 29 elementary schools. The district operates the Mission Valley Regional Occupational Program jointly with Newark and New Haven Unified School Districts.

For the year 2019, William Hopkins JHS, Mission San Jose HS, John F. Kennedy HS, and American HS all received the California Distinguished Schools Award, administered by the California Department of Education.

Fremont Christian School and Averroes High School in Fremont are not part of FUSD. California School for the Deaf, Fremont serves Northern California and shares a campus with the statewide California School for the Blind.

=== Colleges and universities ===
The Ohlone Community College District operates Ohlone College in Fremont, and a smaller campus in Newark. The University of Phoenix Bay Area Campus and San Francisco Bay University offers undergraduate and graduate programs in technology and management areas.

=== Public libraries ===
The Alameda County Library is headquartered in Fremont. The Fremont Main Library is the largest branch with the highest circulation of the Alameda County Library, and shares its building with the Alameda County Library Administration. It has the Maurice Marks Center for Local and California History, and the Fukaya public meeting room. Alameda County Library has other branch libraries in Centerville, Irvington and Niles.

== Transportation ==
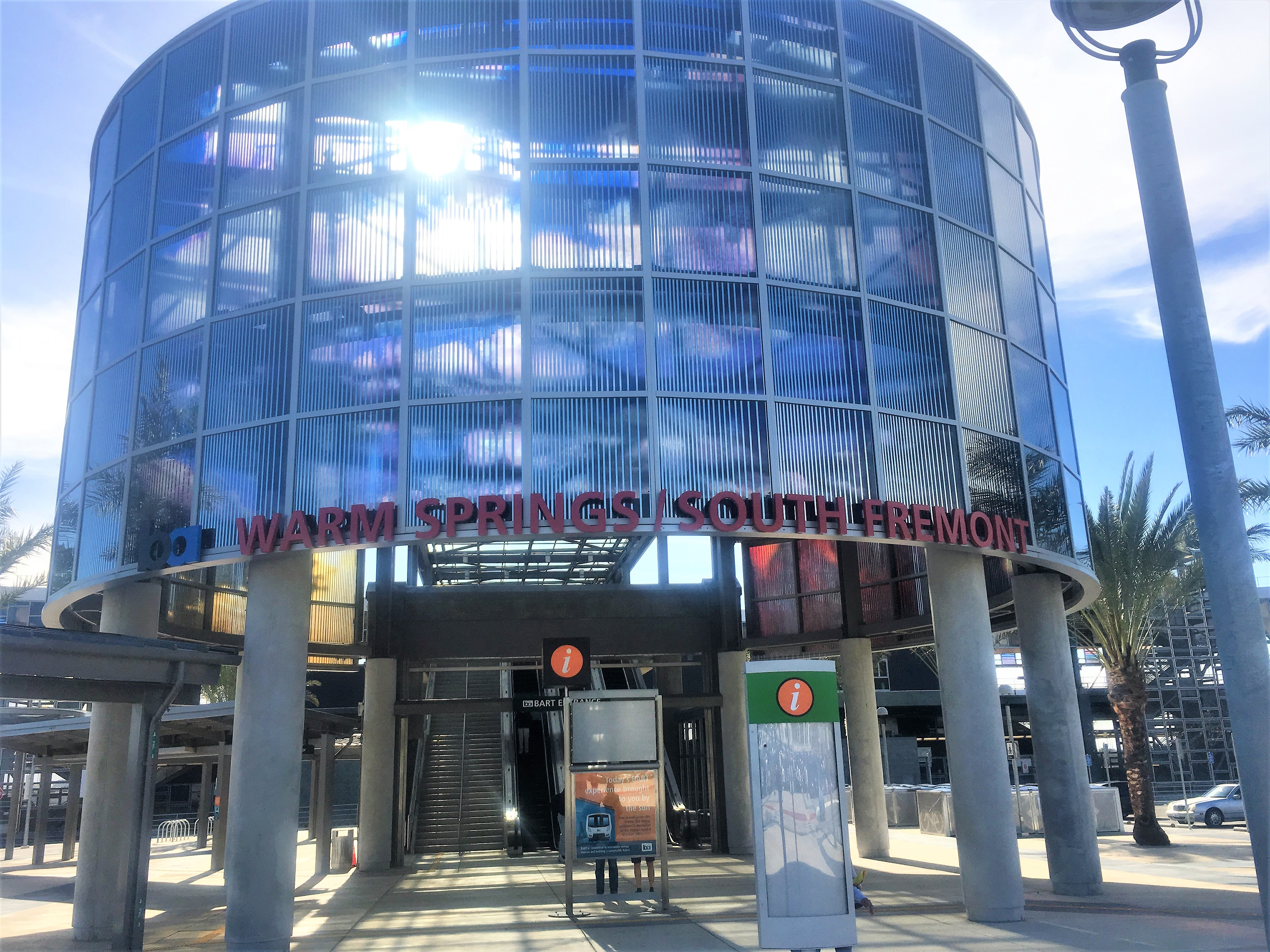
Entrance of Warm Springs South Fremont Station

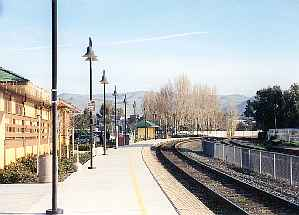
View of Fremont-Centerville (Amtrak station) from Platform #1

Fremont is served by Interstate 880 (Nimitz Freeway) and Interstate 680 (Sinclair Freeway). Though they do not intersect, they are connected in the Warm Springs district via a very busy one-mile segment of Mission Boulevard which is SR 262. In addition, it is served by SR 84 and the segment of Mission Boulevard which is SR 238. The city is the eastern terminus of the Dumbarton Bridge.

Elevated sound levels exist along Interstate 880; Caltrans and the city have sought to mitigate sound levels by constructing noise barriers.

Regional rail transportation is provided by BART and the Altamont Corridor Express (ACE). Fremont's BART station once served as the southernmost terminus for the BART system; a 5.4-mile (8.7 km) BART extension to the Warm Springs / South Fremont station opened on March 25, 2017. A southward BART extension into Santa Clara county and the Milpitas and Berryessa/North San José stations opened on June 13, 2020; a further BART extension to downtown San Jose is in progress. The Fremont-Centerville station provides a stopping point for ACE service, which travels from Stockton to San Jose, as well as for Amtrak's Capitol Corridor service. Bus service is provided by AC Transit locally.

=== Future rail ===
Caltrain is undertaking environmental and engineering review for a planned Dumbarton Rail Corridor between the Peninsula and Alameda County. It would add Caltrain stations to Union City, Fremont-Centerville, Newark, and Menlo Park/East Palo Alto.

== Notable people ==
- DeAnna Bennett, mixed martial artist
- Ashish Chattha, soccer player
- Karen Chen, figure skater, US National Champion 2017
- Rosalie Chiang, actress
- Emilio Castillo, founding member of Tower of Power
- Dom Corleo, rapper
- Vinod Dham, father of the Intel Pentium
- Shawon Dunston, Major League Baseball infielder
- Dina Eastwood, ex-wife of actor/director Clint Eastwood
- Dennis Eckersley, Major League Baseball Hall of Famer, pitched for several MLB teams; Washington High School graduate
- Harry Edwards, sociologist and civil rights activist; worked with San Francisco 49ers and Golden State Warriors, professor at UC-Berkeley; resides in Fremont
- Yousef Erakat, YouTube personality
- Qader Eshpari, Afghan musical artist
- Robb Flynn, musician
- Tony Gemignani, World Champion Pizza Maker.
- Pragathi Guruprasad, Indian playback singer
- MC Hammer, musical artist
- Bud Harrelson, Major League Baseball player and coach
- Don Hertzfeldt, animator
- Ariel Hsing, Olympic table tennis player
- Khaled Hosseini, award-winning Afghan author
- Karin Ireland, author
- Izye, trap-pop and R&B singer-songwriter
- Ro Khanna, U.S. representative
- Dominic Kinnear, professional soccer player and coach
- Steven Kwan - MLB player
- Steve Lewis, sprinter, Olympic gold medalist
- Christine Liang, president and founder of ASI Corp.
- Allan Haines Loughead, co-founder of Lockheed Corporation
- Mikh McKinney, basketball player
- Justin Medlock, NFL placekicker
- Helen Wills Moody, tennis pro, won 31 Grand Slam championships
- Juanita More, drag queen and activist
- Lamond Murray, John F. Kennedy High School graduate, UC-Berkeley and NBA basketball player
- Sammy Obeid, comedian, performed 1,000 nights of comedy in a row, a world record
- Julie Pinson, actress
- Gary Plummer, Mission San Jose High School graduate, USFL and NFL football player
- Rome Ramirez, of Sublime with Rome
- Randy Ready, John F. Kennedy High graduate; Major League Baseball player 1983–1995
- Dick Ruthven, Irvington High graduate, starting pitcher for 1980 World Series champion Philadelphia Phillies
- Ryan Sinn, musician
- Joel Souza, film director and screenwriter
- Sid Sriram, Indian playback singer
- Ray Stevens, pro wrestler
- Cal Stevenson (born 1996), baseball outfielder for the San Francisco Giants
- Kevin Tan, Olympic gymnast
- Meagan Tandy, model and actress
- Pat Tillman, football player who left his NFL career to enlist in the U.S. Army
- Robert Turbin, NFL running back
- Kevin Turner, Mission San Jose High School graduate, linebacker in NFL for several teams
- Vanity, former singer and actress turned evangelist; spent final years in Fremont
- Bill Walsh, coach of NFL's San Francisco 49ers in Hall of Fame; coached for Washington High School
- Sean Wang, film director
- Len Wiseman, film director
- John Woodcock, NFL defensive lineman
- Kristi Yamaguchi, figure skater, Olympic gold medalist

== Sister cities ==
Fremont was formerly a sister city to Elizabeth, South Australia until Elizabeth merged with Munno Para to form the City of Playford in 1997. Currently, Fremont is twinned with the following cities:

| City | Subdivision | Country | Date |
|---|---|---|---|
| Puerto Peñasco | Sonora | Mexico | 1971 |
| Fukaya | Saitama Prefecture | Japan | 1979 |
| Horta | Azores | Portugal | 1987 |
| Lipa City | Batangas | Philippines | 1992 |
| Jaipur | Rajasthan | India | 1993 |

== See also ==
- California Nursery Company
- Mission Peak
- Narika
- Vallejo Flour Mill
