= Washington Township Museum of Local History (Fremont, California) =

Historical museum located in Fremont, California

Coordinates: 37°31′48″N 121°55′13″W

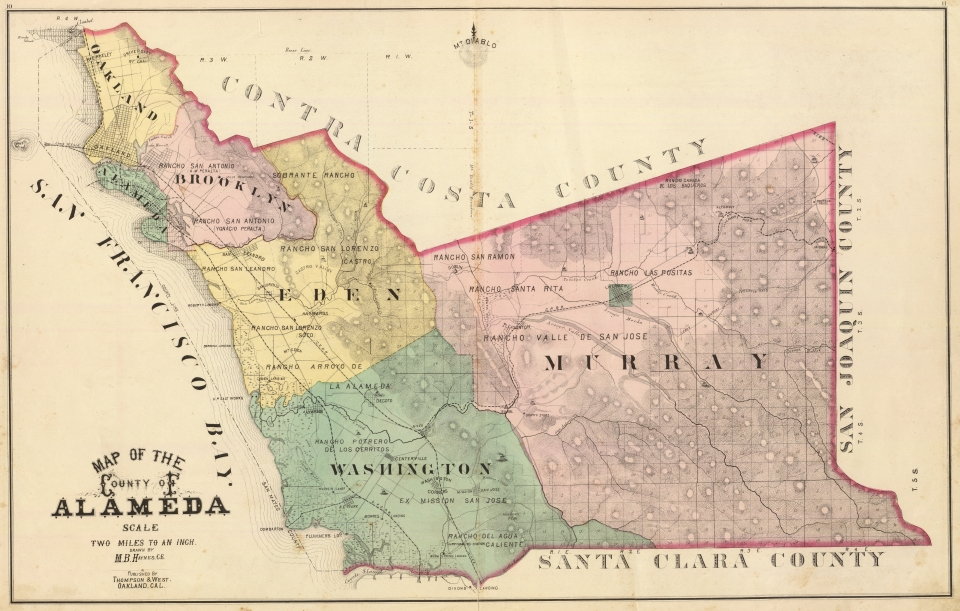
Alameda County, 1878 (six townships): Washington Township in green (lower left)

Washington Township Museum of Local History is a historical museum located in Fremont, California. The two historical organizations, the Mission Peak Heritage Foundation (MPHF) and Washington Township Historical Society (WTHS), formed the Museum of Local History Guild to focus on education, archival research and preservation of the historical resources of Washington Township. The Washington Township was created in 1853 from the southwestern part of Alameda County. For many decades, Washington Township consisted of agricultural fields dotted with eight towns, many now part of Fremont and some with local historians publishing their stories. The eight towns were the town of Newark, the two towns that became Union City, viz., Alvarado and Decoto, and the five towns that became Fremont, viz., Centerville, Niles (Vallejo Mills), Mission San Jose, Irvington, and Warm Springs.

Cecilia Weed was one of the people who led the effort to create the museum. Philip Holmes was the museum's first president.

The historical collection of Dr. Robert Fisher found a home here, which includes local record books, documents and 7500 photographs.

The museum is located in a historic fire station building which was built in 1954 for the Mission San Jose Fire District. Volunteer fire-fighters operated the fire station until the City of Fremont took over. It served as a fire station until 1994, then was remodeled and leased to the Mission Peak Heritage Foundation and The Washington Township Historical Society for use as a museum. Volunteers have landscaped the garden around the museum.

The Washington Township Museum of Local History offers tours for classes and other groups at the museum and the Higuera Adobe Historical Park. Walking tours explore local history from the settlement of Washington Township through the development of the Tri-cities: Fremont, Newark and Union City.

== See also ==
- Washington Township, Alameda County, California
- Alameda County, California
