= Niles Essanay Silent Film Museum =

Film museum in the Niles District of Fremont, California

Coordinates: 37.57707°N 121.98013°W

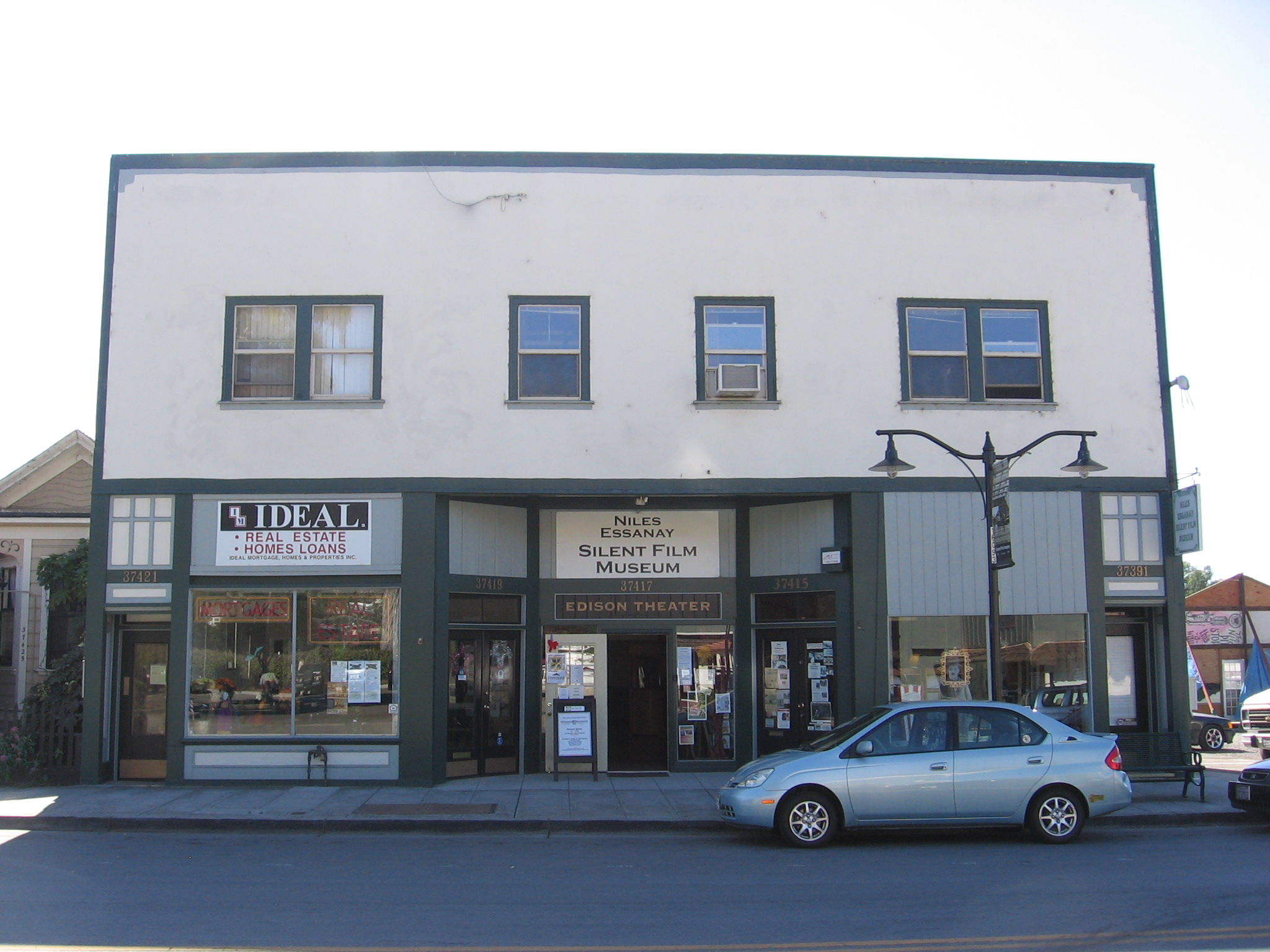
The Niles Film Museum in 2012

The Niles Essanay Silent Film Museum is located in what is now the Niles district in the city of Fremont, California. The museum is housed in the Edison Theater building, a century-old Nickelodeon movie theater, just half a block from the former site of the Niles Essanay Studios where Broncho Billy and Charlie Chaplin made films in the 1910s. It is dedicated to preserving and showing silent films and their history.

The museum houses a large collection of Motion Picture equipment and related artifacts, as well as about 10,000 Silent Films in their archive.

== Restoration work ==
The silent film historical work of one of the members of its staff, David Kiehn, was featured on 60 Minutes for demonstrating that a film shot in San Francisco titled A Trip Down Market Street was actually made a few days before the 1906 San Francisco earthquake. When Google made a Google Doodle for April 16, 2011, in celebration of Chaplin's 122nd birthday, they collaborated with the Niles Silent Film Museum to produce the short.
