= Fremont Hub =

- Location: Fremont, California
- Coordinates: 37.544102°N 121.987984°W
- Address: 39281 Fremont Hub
- Management: Kimco Realty
- Owner: Kimco Realty
- Stores: 60
- Floor area: 504,666 square feet (46,885.0 m^{2})
- Website: fremonthub.shopkimco.com

Fremont Hub is a regional outdoor shopping center in Fremont, California, United States, in the San Francisco Bay Area. It is located on Mowry Avenue in the city's Central District. The shopping center is anchored by Target, and it also includes major retailers such as Marshalls, Michaels, Ross Dress for Less, Safeway and Trader Joe's.

The Fremont Hub was originally constructed in the early 1960s, and included then-major anchors Montgomery Ward among others. It was built around the existing residential property along Fremont Blvd. which became a popular Halloween attraction in later years.

By 1968, Safeway had also anchored at the Hub, as well as a small movie theater called "Fox Theater".

The Hub continued expansion into the 1970s with additional restaurants added along the perimeter of the property, such as Shelly's.

In the 1980s, additional storefronts were added along the perimeter of the property again, and Safeway moved into a larger building on the NW corner of the property, with several other businesses moving in, such as daycare center Kidspark. Montgomery Ward remodeled in approximately 1982 in a national move to modernize their stores.

The original Fox Theater was torn down in 1986 and in its place a much larger multiplex movie theater called "GCC Fremont Hub 8 Cinemas" opened.

In 1999, the theater changed ownership and became Bollywood theater Naz 8 Cinemas, then closed in October 2004 after going out of business in 2003. The movie theater was demolished and a PetsMart was built in its place the following year. In approximately 2000, the larger Safeway complex received an additional remodel, closing Kidspark and converting the space into smaller tenants on the opposite side of the building, such as the UPS Store and a nail salon.

In 1997, Montgomery Ward filed for bankruptcy, and in 2001, the major retailer shut its doors. After an extensive remodel, Target then opened its doors in its place the following year.

The exterior of the mall featured several redesigns as well, happening most notably in the 1980s and 2000s.

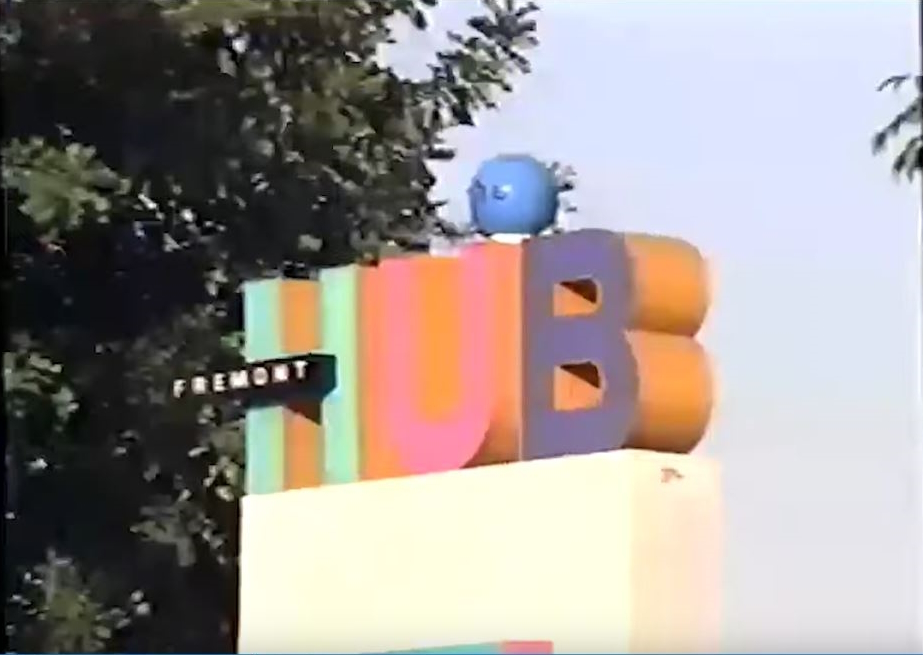
The main entry sign installed in a 1980s exterior redesign of the Hub. It was torn down around 2000.
