= Alameda County Library =

Public library system in California's Alameda County

- Location: Alameda, California
- Established: 1910
- Branches: 11

Collection
- Size: 1,115,484 items

Access and use
- Circulation: 6,796,800
- Population served: 589,666

Other information
- Budget: $40,531,136
- Website: http://www.aclibrary.org

The Alameda County Library, in Alameda County, California, is a public library system that provides services from eleven branch libraries in the cities of Albany, Dublin, Fremont, Newark and Union City and the unincorporated communities of Castro Valley, Cherryland and San Lorenzo. According to 2005/2006 statistics, the total service area represents a population of about 522,000, and annual circulation is reported to be around 5.5 million. Its headquarters are located in Fremont.

The County Library was established in 1910 and is governed by the Alameda County Board of Supervisors. The Alameda County Library Advisory Commission advises the County Librarian and the Board of Supervisors on library services.

== Funding ==
The County Library is funded primarily by local property taxes, with additional revenue from state grants and contracts with cities for additional open hours and services. Service in unincorporated areas is funded in part by a utility users and business license tax collected in unincorporated areas, and allocated by the Board of Supervisors. The Alameda County Library Foundation and Friends or Library League groups support library programs and services in each community.

== Branches ==
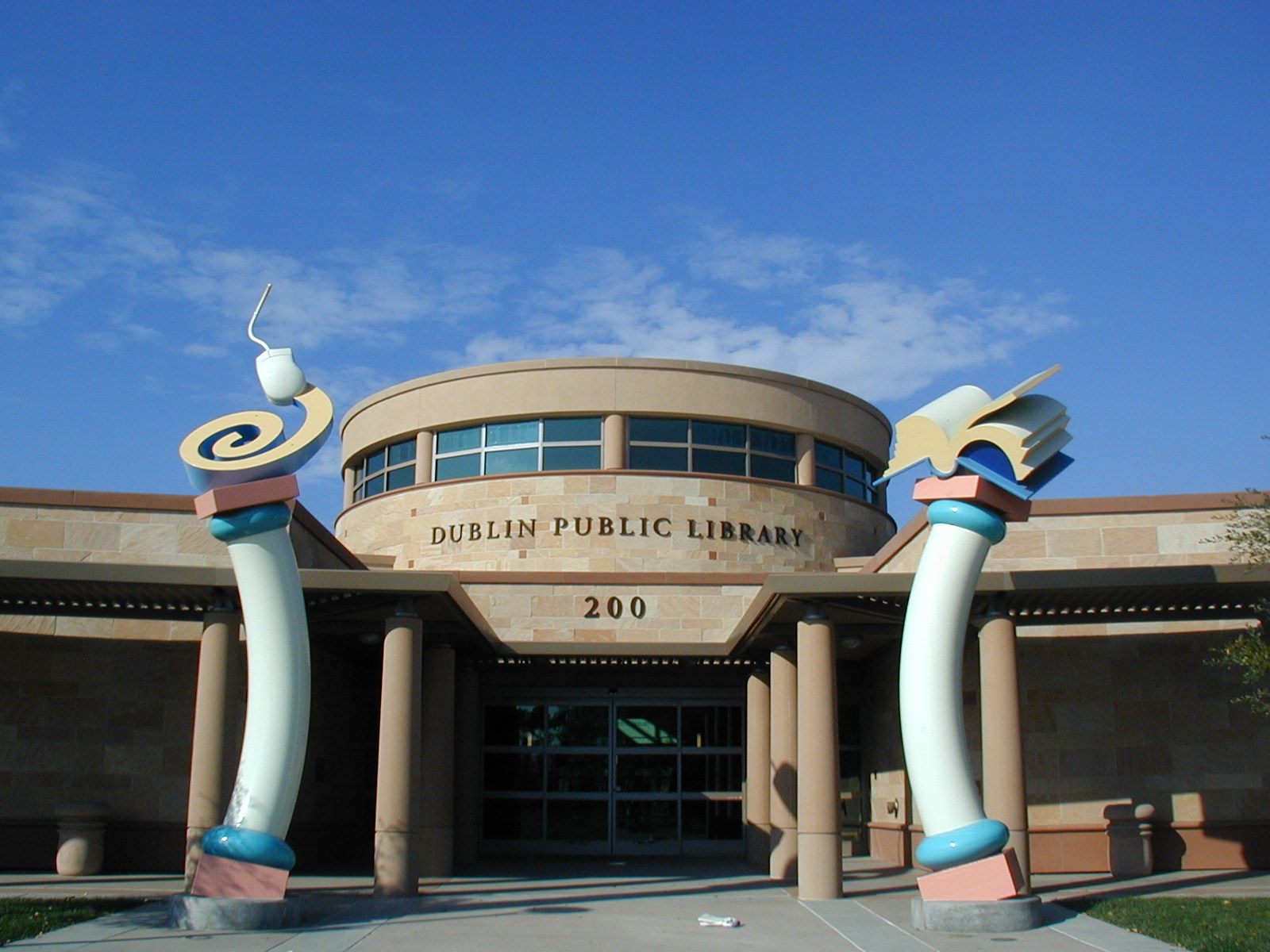
The Alameda County Library branch in Dublin.

As of 2022, the Alameda County Library has eleven branch libraries.

- Albany
- Castro Valley (received funding for a new library that opened in 2009)
- Centerville (Fremont)
- Cherryland
- Dublin
- Irvington (Fremont)
- Fremont Main
- Newark
- Niles (Fremont)
- San Lorenzo
- Union City

Though the cities of Alameda and Berkeley are part of Alameda County, their city libraries are not part of the Alameda County Library system.

=== Castro Valley ===
The Castro Valley Library serves approximately 60,000 residents in the unincorporated area of Castro Valley, California.

==== History ====
The original Castro Valley Library was first opened in 1927 on Castro Valley Blvd, in a water tank owned by the Booth family. It later moved to another building, at 20055 Redwood Road, which was designed by architects Wahamaki and Corey. That building opened in 1962 with a collection of over 23,000 items, at a cost of $230,000. The current collection is approximately 100,000 items. A new replacement library opened on October 31, 2009, at 3600 Norbridge Ave. The new library has been funded by a combination of state bond (13.9 million) and public support for a total cost of $22,276,464. The architect for the project is Noll and Tam, Berkeley, California. The contractor for the new building is W.A. Thomas, Inc., Martinez, California. A groundbreaking ceremony was held April 18, 2008.

== Services and programs ==
The Alameda County Library Bookmobile is a library on wheels with books, magazines, music CDs, CDROMs, videos, DVDs and books on cassette and CD for children, teens, and adults. The bookmobile visits schools and neighborhoods once every two weeks.

=== Youth services ===
- The Booklegger program is dedicated to independent reading by children by visiting classrooms, and introducing selected books.
- The Homework Help program provides students with homework assistance during after-school hours. The Albany, Castro Valley, Dublin, Newark, San Lorenzo and Union City libraries have Homework Centers.

=== Adult services ===
- The Homeword Bound program consists of volunteers trained by Older Adults Services to bring the library to seniors and others who are unable to visit their local branch library.

=== Jail services ===
Alameda County Library provides library service and literacy/life skills instruction to men and women held in county jails. Most of the materials circulated each year are donated by members of the community.

- The Write to Read is a program bringing library services, programs and literacy to incarcerated youth.
- Reading for Life (RFL) is a 16-week self-sufficiency skills training academy for pre-release, low-literacy level inmates in the Alameda County Jail system.
- The Jail Tutoring program trains and assigns volunteer literacy tutors to English-speaking inmates in the Alameda County Jail who read and write below the eighth grade level.

== Community languages ==
Alameda County Library collects languages that support the community demographics. A Community Language Committee was formed to identify the needs of communities and sustain a balanced collection of international languages.

The library actively collects works in the following languages:

- Chinese
- French
- Hindi
- Korean
- Persian
- Spanish
- Tagalog
- Vietnamese

== Timeline ==
- 1910 - The Alameda County Library Department was organized as part of the Oakland Free Library. San Lorenzo opened as the first Alameda County branch.
- 1911 - Irvington, Newark and Niles branches established.
- 1913 - Albany branch opened.
- 1914 - Dublin branch established.
- 1918 - Board of Supervisors established Alameda County Library; contract with Oakland ends.
- 1920s - Jail Service began.
- 1948 - Bookmobile put into operation.
- 1964 - Publication of the Henderson Report which recommended the Library's current organizational structure including the proposal that the systems' central library be located in Fremont. Alameda County Library Advisory Commission established by ordinance.
- 1965 - Opening of the Union City branch.
- 1966 - The Libraries of Alameda County, Contra Costa County, Alameda City, and Richmond formed the East Bay Cooperative Library System (this system would develop into the Bay Area Library Information System).
- 1970 - Dublin moved to its new building on Village Parkway.
- 1971 - Main Spanish language collection bought with federal funds. Fremont Main opened in September, in November. Irvington branch building, which moved to a new building in April, was destroyed by fire in November.
- 1972 - Irvington branch reopened.
- 1973- Audio-visual collection established with revenue sharing grants.
- 1974 - Centerville closed by fire; half of the collection was saved.
- 1976 - Centerville reopened in their new building.
- 1977 - Bay Area Library & Information System (BALIS) formed.
- 1978 - All libraries closed at the end of June because of Proposition 13 funding decrease. Branches reopened for circulation in August (except Niles and Irvington which opened later).
- 1980 - Jail services reestablished in November.
- 1983 - New Newark Library opened.
- 1984 - Budget for library materials reaches $1 million.
- 1985 -Library received John Cotton Dana Award for 'Know How' campaign.
- 1986 - Library received John Cotton Dana Award for Picture Books campaign.
- 1988 - Circulation exceeds 3 million items. Library won John Cotton Dana Award for the Local Support Project.
- 1989 - Fremont Main Library moved to 2400 Stevenson Blvd.
- 1991 - Albany Library awarded $2,599,393 grant from the 1988 California Library Construction and Renovation Bond Act toward the construction of a new library.
- 1993 - State shifted property taxes to cover state budget deficit resulting in a 40% reduction in County Library revenues. Library open hours and staff were reduced by approximately 50% as a result.
- 1994 - New Albany Library opened at 1247 Marin Avenue.
- 1995 - Public access to the World Wide Web available at Fremont Main, San Lorenzo, and Union City Libraries funded by the State Info People Grant. Castro Valley's workstation was funded by community donations.
- 1996 - Provided a gateway to the Internet through the Library's on-line public access catalog (OPAC). Established an independent Alameda County Library Foundation with the goal of seeking donations from businesses and individuals to enhance library services. Received a three-year grant for $221,000 from the Lila Wallace-Reader's Digest Fund through the Alameda County Library Foundation to contribute to the Adult Literacy Program.
- 1997 - Introduced CD-ROMs for checkout at all locations.
- 1999 - Pleasanton withdraws from the Alameda County Library and forms a city library.
- 2003 - New Dublin Library opens at 200 Civic Plaza.
- 2004 - Castro Valley is awarded $13.9 million in bond funding to build a new replacement facility.
- 2006 - Free wireless internet access is added throughout Alameda County Library locations.
- 2019 - Elimination of library fines.

== Awards ==
Write to Read

- 2006 Coming Up Taller award, bestowed by the President's Committee on the Arts and the Humanities. This award recognizes the outstanding nature the library program in serving the literacy needs of incarcerated youth.
- 2006 Movers & Shakers Award from Library Journal.
- Alameda County Office of Education Public Service Award, 2005.
- Community Partnership Award, from the University of California, Berkeley, 2000.

== Sources ==
- Alameda County Library Website Alameda County Library. Retrieved on 2007-10-10.
- Alameda County Library Strategic Plan (1998). Becoming a Model of Excellence: Alameda County Library
