= Qader Eshpari =

Afghan singer living in America

قادر اشپاری Qader Eshpari
- Born: Qader Eshpari; April 1975 (age 50); Kabul, Afghanistan
- Genres: Pop, Soft Rock
- Occupations: Singer, composer
- Instrument: Voice
- Years active: 1996–present
- Labels: Negah, CineVision, Afghanistans Advance Music

Qader Eshpari (Dari: قادر اشپاری) (born April 1975) is an Afghan-American singer. He is of the new generation of exiled artists who have achieved fame outside of Afghanistan. He currently lives in Fremont, California.

Qader has given concerts all over the world. Including dozens of times in Europe, United States, Canada. Once in Australia.

== Early life ==
Qader Eshpari was born in a suburb of Kabul. To avoid the impending war in Afghanistan, his family moved to Pakistan, then to Germany and a while later they immigrated to the United States.

After finishing high school in Las Vegas, Nevada, Qader moved to California to pursue higher education. There he earned a degree in Computer Science. After working for IBM as a Technical Support Engineer for three years, he decided to return to his childhood passion once again. He started composing music and worked with various other musicians to start a career in this field professionally.

== Involvements ==
Eshpari has a deep interest in Indian movie culture and music and much of his recorded songs reflect this. His renditions of popular Indian film songs are present in almost every album. He is also an active traveler and has toured all over United States, Canada, Australia, Europe and India. Most of these trips have been concert performances. During his 2006 visit to Afghanistan he sang to a group of disadvantaged children at an orphanage.

Eshpari returned to Afghanistan after 25 years in November 2005, with the intention to record new music videos there. He swiftly held a concert at Kabul's Ghazi Stadium.

== Contribution ==
Eshpari's has been credited with creating and arranging music for over 100 albums for various singers from Afghanistan. Other achievements include an English song: Dance with Me (from his Sahil Eshq CD). Qader Eshpari's first professional music video is released and it is called Ashiana.

== Discography ==
=== Albums ===
Source:"قادر اشپاری ، در برنامه خاطره ها و ترانه ها" (in Persian). British Broadcasting Corporation. November 9, 2008.

- 1996: Soroode Asheqi
- 1997: Sabrina
- 1998: Sia Moo
- 2001: Only You
- 2003: Sahil Eshq
- 2005: Naazi Jaan
- 2009: Generation X

== Videography ==
- 2007: Ashiana (DVD)
