= Narika =

Asian-American culture in California

- Founded: April 1992
- Type: Domestic violence organization
- Location: Fremont, California
- Website: www.narika.org

Narika is a Fremont, California organization that confronts domestic violence in South Asian American communities.

Narika was founded in 1991 as the Bay Area Indian Women's Support Group and later as the South Asian Women's Support Group. Founders launched a crisis helpline, and established the organization in 1992.

The group works with a variety of community partners and offers services to women and children in abusive situations in English, Bengali, Gujarati, Hindi, Kannada, Konkani, Malayalam, Marathi, Nepali, Punjabi, Sinhala, Tamil, Telugu, Tibetan, and Urdu.
