= Christine Liang =

Taiwanese-American businesswoman

- Born: Christine Chu; Taiwan
- Education: Deming University (BA)
- Occupation: Businesswoman
- Years active: 1987–present
- Employer: ASI Corp.
- Known for: Largest family-owned business in the Silicon Valley
- Spouse: Marcel Liang (m. 1984)
- Children: 2
- Website: www.asipartner.com

Christine Liang is a Taiwanese-American businesswoman. She is the president and founder of ASI Corp., a Fremont, California-based wholesale distributor of computer software, hardware, and accessories.

== Biography ==
Born Christine Chu, she attended Deming University in Taipei and graduated with a bachelor's degree in accounting in 1979. She married Marcel Liang in 1984. Half a year after their marriage, Marcel left Taiwan to pursue his graduate degree at Emporia State University in Emporia, Kansas, while she remained in Taiwan, working for a jewelry store. Marcel received his MBA in 1986 and moved to the Silicon Valley to work for a motherboard manufacturer, where Liang joined him.

Initially she was employed by a retail firm that sold computer keyboards and cases, but decided to open her own business importing computer components from Asia and distributing them in the United States. She founded Asia Source Inc. in Sunnyvale, California, in 1987, using $16,000 in personal savings. In 1989 Marcel joined the company as chairman and CEO. As the company branched into distribution of U.S.-made products, the business name was changed to ASI in 2001.

Liang credits her older brother, James Chu, founder of ViewSonic, with stocking ASI's initial inventory by selling her computer monitors and components at cost price. ASI imports and distributes monitors, disk drives, keyboards, motherboards, and floppy drives. Its clients are large computer companies and retailers, as well as value-added resellers who build computers for specific markets and needs. ASI maintains 10 warehouses in the United States and also offers customer support.

ASI Corp. is the largest family-owned business in Silicon Valley, with 2014 revenues of $1.39 billion. In 2010 the company was ranked first on DiversityBusiness.com's list of the Top 100 Women-Owned Businesses in California, and in 2015 the firm ranked in the top 5 of the Top 500 Women-Owned Businesses in the United States. Liang serves as president, with a 51% share; her husband Marcel Liang is chairman and CEO.

== Awards and recognition ==
Liang has received recognition for running a woman-owned business. In 1996 she was ranked 17th on Working Woman's list of the top 50 women-owned businesses; she was ranked 12th on the magazine's 1997 list and 22nd on its 1998 list. Also in 1996, she was a finalist for Entrepreneur of the Year by Inc. The National Foundation for Woman Business Owners included her on its 1997 list of the Leading Woman Entrepreneurs of The World.

In 2007 Pink placed Liang 4th on its list of America's 50 Top Women Business Owners of 2007. Avenue has named her one of the 500 Most Influential Asian Americans.

== Personal ==
Liang and her husband Marcel have two children. They reside in Fremont, California.
