= DCKAP =

Software product company

- Company type: Private
- Available in: English
- Headquarters: Austin, Texas
- Founder: Karthik Chidambaram
- Industry: Computer Software, SaaS
- Website: Official website

DCKAP is a cloud-based software product company that empowers distributors to build, connect, automate & grow their online business. DCKAP Integrator, the ERP Integration platform, connects distributors' ERP systems with eCommerce, CRM, Inventory, Accounting, Logistics, Marketplaces like 3M, and more, so that data automatically flows between applications in real time. Headquartered in Austin, TX, and Development Center in Chennai, India, today DCKAP is a remote-first and fully distributed workforce company. Founded in 2005 by Karthik Chidambaram.

== History ==
DCKAP was founded in Chicago, Illinois and Chennai, India in 2005. Two years later, it moved its headquarters to Fremont, California, and later to Round Rock Texas. In 2008, DCKAP set up an office in Chennai, India.

In 2009, the company began working with Magento, Drupal, WordPress, and other open source technologies. Three years later, it entered the mobile apps market with new iOS applications such as HomeFly and Learn Alphabets & Numbers. In 2014, the firm moved into commerce, content development, and consulting.

In 2022, DCKAP rebranded to a product company. Its products include DCKAP Integrator and DCKAP PIM.

== Products and Services ==
DCKAP Integrator is the ERP Integration platform that connects distributors' ERP systems to any number of business applications—including the eCommerce platform, CRM, Inventory, Accounting, Logistics, and Marketplaces like 3M, to name a few.

Depending on the integration, it can provide real-time customer data, product data, inventory data, order data, financial data, and more. It helps distributors save thousands of hours of manual work, create smoother workflows, and make better decisions backed by accurate data.

== Employees ==
Karthik Chidambaram is DCKAP's Founder and CEO. Before starting DCKAP in 2005, out of his apartment in Chicago, he worked as a consultant to the Fireman's Fund Insurance Company and IBM and as an Assistant Scientific Programmer for the Argonne National Laboratory in Argonne, Illinois.

== Clients ==
DCKAP have helped hundreds of distributors across various sectors. Worked with names such as Robertson Lighting, Sunrise Electrical Supply (an IMARK Electrical member), Province Electrical (a Canadian Schneider Electric distributor), C-Line Products, Bosch Hydraulic Connections, WG Henschen, Belmont Equipment & Technologies, and Marysville Marine Distributors - helping them save costs and improve business insights.
