= Izye =

American singer and songwriter

- Citizenship: American
- Occupations: Singer, songwriter
- Website: iamizye.com

Izye (born Isabel Rose Garcia; February 15, 2001) is an American singer and songwriter known for her work in trap-pop and R&B music.

== Biography ==
=== Early life and education ===
Izye was raised in the San Francisco Bay Area.

=== Career ===
Izye began her music career in 2019. She has released ten singles, including “Read My Mind” (2024), a collaboration with Marc E. Bassy, as well as “Your Girl” (2021), “Drip” (2022), “fwmf” (2022), “Selena” (2023), and “Nervous” (2024).

She released her first EP, F**K BOYS; GET MONEY!! in 2022. In 2024, she released “Tiramisu”, one of the tracks on her first EP, featuring Brooke Amor.

In May 2025, she joined FLO as an opening act on five dates of the west coast leg of their Access All Areas North American tour. On May 11, 2025, she released her second EP, “Breaking Cycles, Not Hearts.”

== Discography ==
S. No	Year	Title
1	2022	F**K BOY$; GET MONEY!!! (EP)
2	2023	Drip
3	2023	Selena
