= Washington Township, Alameda County, California =

Former civil township

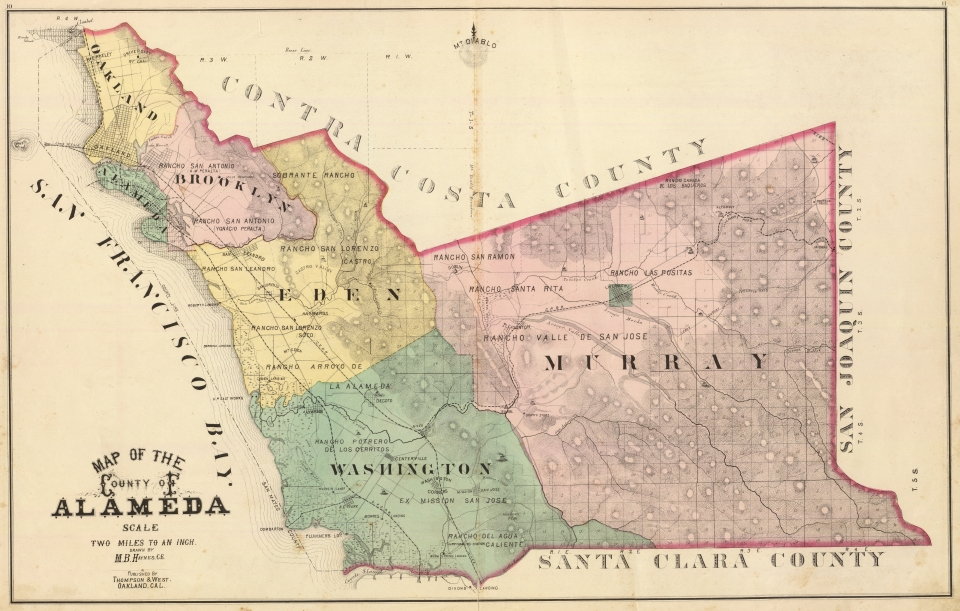
Washington Township (in green, lower left) within Alameda County as of 1878

Washington Township is a former township of Alameda County, California, United States in the San Francisco Bay Area region, which includes the present day cities of Union City, Fremont, and Newark. The first permanent settlement in the area was Mission San José, established in 1797. The township was formed in 1853, and named for president George Washington.

== History ==
Events leading to the formation of the township began in 1797 with the establishment of Mission San José by the Spanish. Many Ohlone Native Americans settled at the mission to work, ending their traditional village life of hunting and gathering. In 1834, Mexico released California's Native Americans from the control of the mission system, as well as giving the mission property to caretakers.

Several Mexican land grants were given from this area. Fulgencia Higuera received a grant known as Rancho Agua Caliente in 1839. Andrews Pico and Juan B. Alvarado were granted the outer lands of Mission San José, known as Rancho Ex-Mission San José, in 1846, but it was taken from them by California courts in 1859. Thomas Pacheco and Augustin Alviso received Rancho Potrero de los Cerritos in 1844, and José de Jesus Vallejo received Rancho Arroyo de la Alameda (which extended into Eden Township) in 1842.

The California gold rush beginning in 1848 brought many prospectors to travel through the Mission San José area to the mountains, making the Mission an important trading site.

In 1849, California became a United States territory, and when California achieved statehood in 1850, the area became part of Santa Clara County. In 1853, Alameda County was formed from portions of Contra Costa and Santa Clara Counties, and was divided into six townships including Washington. Alvarado in present-day Union City was designated as the county seat.

== Geographical features ==
Washington Township is bounded to the west by the San Francisco Bay, and to the east by a mountain range that includes the 2,520-foot-tall Mission Peak. Alameda Creek runs from east to west through Niles Canyon, which was used as a passage for the first transcontinental railroad.

Alameda Creek is the most important stream in Alameda County and the Township. From this Creek is derived the name of the County. Alameda Creek was the former boundary between Contra Costa and Santa Clara Counties during the period from 1850, when Contra Costa and Santa Clara Counties were formed, to 1853 when Alameda County was carved from these two Counties. The portion of Washington Township south of Alameda Creek is the only part of Alameda County that is not derived from Contra Costa County.
