= Karin Ireland =

American author

Karin Ireland is an American author of children's literature and books for adults. Several of her books for adults are self-help guides, and she has written a memoir.

== Biography ==
Ireland has written a variety of books for children, including Don't Take Your Snake for a Stroll, which was first published in 2003 by Harcourt. She is also the author of Albert Einstein, a biography published by Silver Burdett Press in 1989 as part of the Pioneers in Change series for children age 12 and over.

Her writing for adults includes Boost Your Child's Self-Esteem: Simple, Effective Ways to Build Children's Self-Respect and Confidence. Ireland has also written a memoir based on her experience with breast cancer.

== Selected works ==
=== Children's books ===
- Hollywood Stuntpeople, Messner (1980). ISBN 067134062X
- Helicopters at Work, Messner (1983). ISBN 0671465031
- Albert Einstein, Silver Burdett Press (1989).
- Wonderful Nature, Wonderful You, Dawn Publications (1996). (ISBN 1-883220-48-3)
- Don't Take Your Snake for a Stroll, Harcourt (2003) and Scholastic Inc. (2005). (ISBN 0-439-74646-9)

=== Other works ===
- Boost Your Child's Self-Esteem: Simple, Effective Ways to Build Children's Self-Respect and Confidence (2000) (ISBN 0-425-17295-3)
- Learning to Trust Myself: Lessons From Cancer and Other Life Dilemmas (ISBN 0-9761452-0-0).
- The Job Survival Instruction Book: 400+ Tips, Tricks, and Techniques to Stay Employed, Third Edition, published by Course Technology PTR (ISBN 1-4354-5710-2)
