= 2026 California's 14th congressional district special election =

- June 16, 2026 (first round); August 18, 2026 (runoff)

California's 14th congressional district
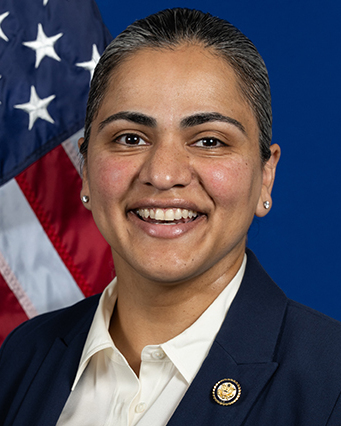

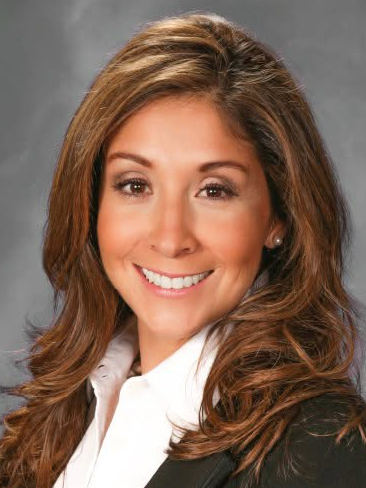

Candidate	Aisha Wahab	Melissa Hernandez	Rakhi Israni Singh
Party	Democratic	Democratic	Democratic
First round	52,961; 42.8%	20,731; 16.8%	15,910; 12.9%
Runoff	51,734; 53.1%	45,700; 46.9%	Eliminated
Candidate	Wendy Huang	Dena Maldonado
Party	Republican	Republican
First round	11,407; 9.2%	11,188; 9.0%
Runoff	Eliminated	Eliminated
- Consolidated precinct results for the 2026 CA-14 special general election Wahab: 50-60% 60-70% 70-80% 80-90% 90-100% Hernandez: 50-60% 60-70% 70-80% 80-90% 90-100% Other: Tie No votes
U.S. Representative before election
Eric Swalwell
Democratic
Elected U.S. Representative
Aisha Wahab
Democratic

The 2026 California's 14th congressional district special election was held on June 16, 2026, to fill the vacant seat in California's 14th congressional district left by Eric Swalwell, who resigned in April after facing allegations of sexual misconduct. No candidate received a majority, so a runoff was held on August 18 between Aisha Wahab and Melissa Hernandez. The special election was conducted under "old boundaries" which were used in 2022 and 2024, while the full term November 2026 election will take place under new boundaries as a result of Proposition 50.

Wahab, a political progressive, was seen as the favorite to win the runoff, while Hernandez received massive support from the pro-Israel lobby in the closing days of the race. Wahab was declared the winner of the runoff on August 20, two days after election night, due to preliminary results being too close to call. She will serve the remainder of Swalwell's term in the 119th United States Congress.

== Background ==
Incumbent Representative Eric Swalwell did not seek re-election in 2026 and instead ran for governor of California. In April 2026, he faced allegations of sexual misconduct from several women. Amid growing calls for him to withdraw, he suspended his gubernatorial campaign on April 12. The following day, he announced his pending resignation from Congress, which was filed and took effect on April 14.

Governor Gavin Newsom announced on April 14 that the special election would be held on August 18, but California special election rules state that the first round would be held on the ninth preceding Tuesday, June 16. Over half of the unofficial candidates in the special election also filed to run in the regularly-scheduled election for California's 14th congressional district. April 23 was the filing deadline for candidates in the special election.

In April 2026, regional Democratic leaders attempted to broker a "caretaker" agreement to avoid an August runoff. The goal was to secure a swift victory by clearing the candidate field for former State Senator Bob Wieckowski to serve as a placeholder for the rest of Swalwell's term. However, he made it clear he would only run if he received a unanimous endorsement from all major contenders. The agreement fell apart when Aisha Wahab refused to sign on. Party leaders, including Representative Zoe Lofgren, had pushed the deal in hopes that a single unified candidate could clear the 50% threshold. Lofgren argued that the narrow margins in the House necessitated full representation to prevent crucial legislation from hypothetically failing by a single vote. Various candidates who ran for the special election also ran in the regularly-scheduled election, including Wahab, Melissa Hernandez, Wendy Huang, Dena Maldonado, Rakhi Israni Singh and Tom Wong.

== Candidates ==
=== Advanced to runoff ===
- Melissa Hernandez (Democratic), Bay Area Rapid Transit Board of Directors District 5, former mayor of Dublin, and candidate in the regular general election
- Aisha Wahab (Democratic), state senator from the 10th district (2022–2026), candidate for this district in 2020 and the regular general election

=== Eliminated in primary ===
- Alisha Cordes (Democratic), business administrator and candidate in the regular primary election
- Wendy Huang (Republican), retired tech executive and candidate in the regular primary election
- Dena Maldonado (Republican), florist and withdrawn candidate in the regular primary election
- Sheriene Ridenour (Democratic), administrative law judge
- Rakhi Israni Singh (Democratic), attorney and candidate in the regular primary election
- Jot Thiara (Democratic), businessman and Republican candidate for CA-01 in the 2026 special election
- Tom Wong (Republican), small business owner and candidate for this district in 2022
- Jack Wu (Republican), educator
- Victor Zevallos (No party preference), financial business strategist

=== Declined ===
- Victor Aguilar Jr. (Democratic), San Leandro city councilor (2018–present) and candidate in the regular primary election (endorsed Wieckowski)
- Carin Elam (Democratic), nonprofit founder and candidate in the regular primary election (endorsed Wieckowski)
- Steve Glazer (Democratic), former state senator from the 7th district (2015–2024) and candidate for California state controller in 2022 (endorsed Wieckowski)
- Matt Ortega (Democratic), former digital director for the Hillary Clinton 2016 presidential campaign and candidate in the regular primary election (endorsed Wieckowski)
- Bob Wieckowski (Democratic), former state senator from the 10th district (2014–2022) and candidate for this district in 2020

== First round ==
=== Endorsements ===
Aisha Wahab (D)

Newspapers

- The Mercury News
- San Francisco Chronicle
Bob Wieckowski (D) (declined)

U.S. representatives

- Zoe Lofgren, CA-18 (1995–present)

State legislators

- Steve Glazer (Democratic), former SD-07 (2015–2024)

=== Results ===
2026 California's 14th congressional district special election
Party	Candidate	Votes	%
Democratic	Aisha Wahab	52,961	42.8
Democratic	Melissa Hernandez	20,731	16.8
Democratic	Rakhi Israni Singh	15,910	12.9
Republican	Wendy Huang	11,407	9.2
Republican	Dena Maldonado	11,188	9.0
Republican	Tom Wong	5,075	4.1
Democratic	Sheriene Ridenour	2,489	2.0
Republican	Jack Wu	2,101	1.7
No party preference	Victor Zevallos	831	0.7
Democratic	Alisha Cordes	713	0.6
Democratic	Jot Thiara	271	0.2
Total votes		123,677	100.0

== Runoff ==
=== Endorsements ===
Melissa Hernandez (D)

U.S. representatives

- Adam Gray, CA-13 (2025–present)
- Sam Liccardo, CA-16 (2025–present)
- Zoe Lofgren, CA-18 (2023–present)

Statewide officals

- Fiona Ma, California State Treasurer (2019–present)

Labor unions

- Teamsters Joint Council 7
- Alameda County Firefighters IAFF Local 55
- Fremont Firefighters IAFF Local 1689
- Livermore-Pleasanton Firefighters IAFF Local 1974

Organizations

- AIPAC
- Congressional Hispanic Caucus
- Elect Democratic Women
- New Democrat Coalition
Aisha Wahab (D)

State legislators

- Bob Wieckowski, former state senator from the 10th district (2014–2022) and candidate for this district in 2020

Labor unions

- National Nurses United
- SEIU
- California Labor Federation

Organizations

- Our Revolution
- Sierra Club
- Equality California
- Congressional Progressive Caucus

Political parties

- California Democratic Party

=== Fundraising ===
Campaign finance reports as of July 29, 2026
Candidate	Raised	Spent	Cash on hand
Melissa Hernandez (D)	$1,534,263	$1,358,127	$176,136
Aisha Wahab (D)	$631,749	$484,843	$146,906
Source: Federal Election Commission

=== Results ===
2026 California's 14th congressional district special election runoff
Party	Candidate	Votes	%
Democratic	Aisha Wahab	51,734	53.1
Democratic	Melissa Hernandez	45,700	46.9
Total votes		97,434	100.0
Democratic hold			

== See also ==
- 2026 United States House of Representatives elections
- List of special elections to the United States House of Representatives
- List of United States representatives from California
- 119th United States Congress
