= Lily Mei =

American politician

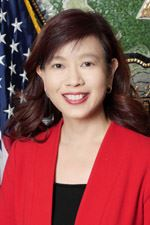
- Official portrait

Mayor of Fremont
- In office 2016–2024
- Preceded by: Bill Harrison
- Succeeded by: Raj Salwan

Member of the Fremont City Council
- In office 2014–2016

Personal details
- Born: Chicago, Illinois, U.S.
- Party: Democratic
- Children: 2
- Education: Drexel University

Lily Mei is an American politician who served as mayor of Fremont, California. She was elected mayor in November 2016, becoming the first female and first Asian American mayor of Fremont.

== Life and career ==
Mei was born in Chicago to Chinese parents and moved to Philadelphia at three years old. She attended Drexel University, earning a Bachelor of Science in business administration. She moved to Fremont in 1994 with her husband, with whom she has two children. Mei began her involvement in politics as a Fremont school board member in 2008 and was reelected in 2012. Mei was elected to Fremont City Council in 2014.

In 2016, Mei campaigned to become mayor of Fremont against incumbent Bill Harrison. The rate of development, traffic congestion, and class sizes of Fremont were among the most salient issues surrounding the election. Mei positioned herself as a candidate who would "stop rampant development", using the slogan prominently in her campaign, while Harrison portrayed Mei as stopping all development. On November 6, 2016, she won the election becoming the first female and first Asian American mayor of Fremont, and ultimately served two terms from 2016 to 2024.

In the wake of the George Floyd's murder, protests against police brutality occurred across America including Fremont. At a march, Mei refused to kneel with protesters, later explaining that she only kneels when praying. In response, protesters demonstrated outside Mei's home a month later, demanding a reduction in police funding. After former state senator Bob Wieckowski termed out in 2022, Mei ran to fill his seat representing California's 10th senatorial district. She won the primary along with Hayward councilwoman Aisha Wahab.

During the campaign, Mei was labelled anti-LGBTQ by the Alameda County Democratic Party for voting against recognizing Harvey Milk Day on school calendars and not voting to include queer authors in an AP English curriculum. She became ineligible for the party's endorsement and Democrats could be reprimanded for publicly supporting her. In response, Mei said she initially rejected Harvey Milk Day because the other School Board Trustees, Lara Calvert-York and Ann Crosbie also rejected her request adding Fred Korematsu and other community leaders. Later a new School Board with Lily Mei voted to accept Fred Korematsu, the other community leaders and Harvey Milk as days to celebrate and recognize. She never banned any LGBTQ books from Fremont schools. The Alameda County Democratic Party failed to recognize this response from Lily Mei and the new School Board Trustees accepting Harvey Milk Day, Fred Korematsu and the other community leaders, including LGBTQ books for Fremont schools to recognize. Special interest groups spent over $7 million on the election. Mei's largest donors were charter school advocates and DaVita, while Wahab's largest donations, 90% were from labor unions. On November 8, 2022, Mei lost the election.

Political offices
Preceded by Bill Harrison	Mayor of Fremont, California; 2016–2024	Succeeded by Raj Salwan
