= Raj Salwan =

American politician

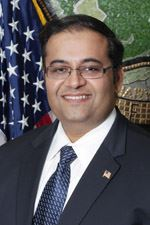
- Official portrait

Mayor of Fremont, California
- Incumbent
- Assumed office December 10, 2024
- Preceded by: Lily Mei

Fremont City Council
- In office 2016–2024

Personal details
- Born: Amritsar district, Punjab, India
- Party: Democratic
- Children: 3
- Education: University of California, Irvine; Tuskegee University

Raj Salwan is an Indian-born American politician serving as mayor of Fremont, California. He was elected mayor in November 2024 and assumed office in December 2024, becoming the first Indian American mayor of Fremont.

== Life and career ==
Salwan was born in a village near Amritsar, India, immigrating to the United States at age six. He grew up in Fremont, where he attended Vallejo Mill Elementary School and Washington High School during the 1980s. He studied biological sciences at UC Irvine and earned a Doctor of Veterinary Medicine from Tuskegee University. Following his college graduation, then mayor of Fremont Bob Wasserman encouraged Salwan to join the Human Relations Commission. He filled the role in 2005. Salwan later served as Fremont's planning commissioner. In 2014, Salwan ran for Fremont City Council but lost to Lily Mei and Rick Jones. In the subsequent 2016 election, Salwan campaigned again and secured his seat along with Vinnie Bacon. In city council, Salwan reduced traffic congestion by 33% and organized a committee to allocate more land for school construction. He was appointed Vice Mayor in 2018 and ran again for City Council in District 5 in 2020, beating Dolev Gandler.

After former mayor Lily Mei termed out, Salwan campaigned to become mayor in 2024 against candidates Vinnie Bacon, Rohan Marfatia, and Hui Ng. During the 2024–25 mayoral campaign, both candidates, Salwan and Bacon, faced criticism from their opponents. News outlets reported on various accusations and responses exchanged during the race. Salwan denied wrongdoing in response to campaign allegations, and emphasized the need to focus on issues rather than personal attacks. Bacon admitted that he missed many meetings due to work, and faced many campaign violations from the FPPC.

On November 5, 2024, Salwan won the election and subsequently assumed office on December 10, 2024. He became the first Indian American mayor of Fremont. In February 2025, Salwan voted in favor of a Fremont city ordinance designed to address large, fire-prone encampments in public rights-of-way. The original draft by the city attorney included a clause prohibiting “aiding or abetting” the establishment of encampments, which drew criticism from homelessness outreach groups. Salwan stated that the measure was not intended to target service providers, but to improve public safety while continuing outreach and shelter access. In March 2025, following community feedback, the city council unanimously voted to remove the contested clause.

Political offices
Preceded by Lily Mei	Mayor of Fremont, California; 2024–present	Incumbent
