= California's 10th district =

California's 10th district may refer to:

- California's 10th congressional district
- California's 10th State Assembly district
- California's 10th State Senate district
