= 2026 United States House of Representatives elections in California =

- November 3, 2026

All 52 California seats to the United States House of Representatives
- Reporting: 83.0% as of Nov 10 at 10:12 AM PST
	Majority party	Minority party	Third party
Party	Democratic	Republican	Independent
Last election	43	9	0
Seats before	43	8	1
Seats after	48	4	0
Seat change	▲5	▼4	▼1
Popular vote	7,645,126	3,232,011	76,313
Percentage	69.80%	29.51%	0.70%

Democratic hold Democratic gain
Republican hold
Democratic
50–60%
60–70%
70–80%
80–90%
90–100%
Republican
50–60%
60–70%
70–80%
90–100%

Passed map under California Proposition 50 (effective 2027–2033 starting with the 2026 elections) Interactive map version

The 2026 United States House of Representatives elections in California were held on November 3, 2026, to elect the 52 U.S. representatives from the State of California, one from each of the state's congressional districts. The elections coincided with other elections to the House of Representatives, elections to the United States Senate, and various state and local elections. The passage of Proposition 50 in 2025 significantly altered many districts. The primary elections took place on June 2, 2026.

== Redistricting ==
=== Background ===
In November 2025, votes decisively approved a constitutional amendment to allow for mid-decade redistricting and to instate a map that would have likely given Democrats 5 additional seats in the House of Representatives. The map defined in Proposition 50 is a Democratic gerrymander intended to offset the gerrymander by Texas Republicans, both of which are part of the broader 2025–2026 United States redistricting effort. It redraws several congressional districts to incorporate larger shares of urban and suburban Democratic voters, increasing Democratic registration advantages in competitive districts and converting several Republican-leaning seats into Democratic-leaning ones. Republicans have responded to Proposition 50 with legislation, their own propositions, and litigation. Republicans challenged the proposition in court both before the election, as well as after it was passed by the voters, but their legal efforts were exhausted when the Supreme Court of the United States refused to hear the appeal.

== Overview ==
United States House of Representatives elections in California, 2026 primary election — June 2, 2026
Party	Votes	Percentage	Candidates	Advancing to general	Seats contesting
Democratic	5,633,898	63.83	154	59	51
Republican	3,036,585	34.40	96	44	43
No party preference	136,016	1.54	32	1	1
Peace and Freedom	8,764	0.10	2	0	0
Libertarian	8,725	0.10	4	0	0
Green	2,352	0.03	1	0	0
Total	8,826,340	100.00	289	104	—

United States House of Representatives elections in California, 2026 General election — November 3, 2026
Party	Votes	Percentage	Seats before	Seats after	+/–
Democratic	7,645,126	69.80%	43	48	▲5
Republican	3,232,011	29.51%	8	4	▼4
No party preference	76,313	0.70%	1	0	▼1
Totals	10,953,450	100.00%	52	52	—

== Statewide polling ==
=== Statewide congressional polls ===
Poll source	Date(s) administered	Sample size (Note: Key: A – all adults RV – registered voters LV – likely voters V – unclear)	Margin of error	Democratic	Republican	Undecided
SurveyUSA (Note: Poll sponsored by KGTV and The San Diego Union-Tribune)	October 19–24, 2026	799 (LV)	± 5.3%	58%	32%	11%
M3 Strategies	October 21–23, 2026	489 (LV)	± 4.4%	61%	38%	1%
SurveyUSA	September 15–20, 2026	742 (LV)	± 4.6%	58%	33%	10%

== Districts 1–26 ==
District		Incumbent				Candidates
Location	2026 PVI	Member	Party	First elected	Status	Candidates
California 1	D+7	James Gallagher	Republican	2026 (special)	Incumbent lost re-election. Democratic gain.	▌ ✓ Mike McGuire (Democratic); ▌James Gallagher (Republican)
California 2	D+13	Jared Huffman	Democratic	2012	Incumbent re-elected.	▌ ✓ Jared Huffman (Democratic); ▌Robin Littau (Republican)
California 3	D+6	Ami Bera; Redistricted from the 6th district	Democratic	2012	Incumbent re-elected.	▌ ✓ Ami Bera (Democratic); ▌Robb Tucker (Republican)
California 4	D+8	Mike Thompson	Democratic	1998	Incumbent advanced to general.	▌Eric Jones (Democratic); ▌Mike Thompson (Democratic)
California 5	R+10	Tom McClintock	Republican	2008	Incumbent re-elected.	▌ ✓ Tom McClintock (Republican); ▌Michael Masuda (Democratic)
California 6	D+5	Kevin Kiley; Redistricted from the 3rd district	Independent	2022	Incumbent lost re-election. Democratic gain.	▌ ✓ Richard Pan (Democratic); ▌Kevin Kiley (Independent)
California 7	D+7	Doris Matsui	Democratic	2005 (special)	Incumbent advanced to general.	▌Doris Matsui (Democratic); ▌Mai Vang (Democratic)
California 8	D+19	John Garamendi	Democratic	2009 (special)	Incumbent re-elected.	▌ ✓ John Garamendi (Democratic); ▌Rudy Recile (Republican)
California 9	D+8	Josh Harder	Democratic	2018	Incumbent re-elected.	▌ ✓ Josh Harder (Democratic); ▌John McBride (Republican)
California 10	D+18	Mark DeSaulnier	Democratic	2014	Incumbent re-elected.	▌ ✓ Mark DeSaulnier (Democratic); ▌Jeff Frese (Republican)
California 11	D+36	Nancy Pelosi	Democratic	1987 (special)	Incumbent retired. Democratic hold.	▌ ✓ Scott Wiener (Democratic); ▌Connie Chan (Democratic)
California 12	D+39	Lateefah Simon	Democratic	2024	Incumbent re-elected.	▌ ✓ Lateefah Simon (Democratic); ▌Jamie Joyce (Democratic)
California 13	D+2	Adam Gray	Democratic	2024	Incumbent re-elected.	▌ ✓ Adam Gray (Democratic); ▌Kevin Lincoln (Republican)
California 14	D+19	Aisha Wahab	Democratic	2026 (special)	Incumbent re-elected.	▌ ✓ Aisha Wahab (Democratic); ▌Melissa Hernandez (Democratic)
California 15	D+26	Kevin Mullin	Democratic	2022	Incumbent re-elected.	▌ ✓ Kevin Mullin (Democratic); ▌Charles Hoelter (Republican)
California 16	D+25	Sam Liccardo	Democratic	2024	Incumbent re-elected.	▌ ✓ Sam Liccardo (Democratic); ▌Peter Soulé (Republican)
California 17	D+21	Ro Khanna	Democratic	2016	Incumbent re-elected.	▌ ✓ Ro Khanna (Democratic); ▌Ritesh Tandon (Republican)
California 18	D+16	Zoe Lofgren	Democratic	1994	Incumbent re-elected.	▌ ✓ Zoe Lofgren (Democratic); ▌Shane Lewis (Republican)
California 19	D+18	Jimmy Panetta	Democratic	2016	Incumbent re-elected.	▌ ✓ Jimmy Panetta (Democratic); ▌Peter Coe Verbica (Republican)
California 20	R+16	Vince Fong	Republican	2024 (special)	Incumbent re-elected.	▌ ✓ Vince Fong (Republican); ▌Sandra Van Scotter (Democratic)
California 21	D+5	Jim Costa	Democratic	2004	Incumbent re-elected.	▌ ✓ Jim Costa (Democratic); ▌Kyle Kirkland (Republican)
California 22	D+1	David Valadao	Republican	2012; 2018 (lost); 2020	Incumbent lost re-election. Democratic gain.	▌ ✓ Randy Villegas (Democratic); ▌David Valadao (Republican)
California 23	R+9	Jay Obernolte	Republican	2020	Incumbent re-elected.	▌ ✓ Jay Obernolte (Republican); ▌Tessa Lynn Hodge (Democratic)
California 24	D+13	Salud Carbajal	Democratic	2016	Incumbent re-elected.	▌ ✓ Salud Carbajal (Democratic); ▌Bob Smith (Republican)
California 25	D+4	Raul Ruiz	Democratic	2012	Incumbent re-elected.	▌ ✓ Raul Ruiz (Democratic); ▌Joe Males (Republican)
California 26	D+9	Julia Brownley	Democratic	2012	Incumbent retired. Democratic hold.	▌ ✓ Jacqui Irwin (Democratic); ▌Sam Gallucci (Republican)

== Districts 27–52 ==
District		Incumbent				Candidates
Location	2026 PVI	Member	Party	First elected	Status	Candidates
California 27	D+6	George T. Whitesides	Democratic	2024	Incumbent re-elected.	▌ ✓ George T. Whitesides (Democratic); ▌Jason Gibbs (Republican)
California 28	D+14	Judy Chu	Democratic	2009 (special)	Incumbent re-elected.	▌ ✓ Judy Chu (Democratic); ▌April Verlato (Republican)
California 29	D+19	Luz Rivas	Democratic	2024	Incumbent re-elected.	▌ ✓ Luz Rivas (Democratic); ▌Angélica Dueñas (Democratic)
California 30	D+21	Laura Friedman	Democratic	2024	Incumbent re-elected.	▌ ✓ Laura Friedman (Democratic); ▌Scott Meyers (Republican)
California 31	D+8	Gil Cisneros	Democratic	2018; 2020 (lost); 2024	Incumbent re-elected.	▌ ✓ Gil Cisneros (Democratic); ▌Eric Ching (Republican)
California 32	D+14	Brad Sherman	Democratic	1996	Incumbent re-elected.	▌ ✓ Brad Sherman (Democratic); ▌Larry Thompson (Republican)
California 33	D+7	Pete Aguilar	Democratic	2014	Incumbent re-elected.	▌ ✓ Pete Aguilar (Democratic); ▌Stephanie Vargas (Republican)
California 34	D+28	Jimmy Gomez	Democratic	2017 (special)	Incumbent lost re-election. Democratic hold.	▌ ✓ Angela Gonzales-Torres (Democratic); ▌Jimmy Gomez (Democratic)
California 35	D+6	Norma Torres	Democratic	2014	Incumbent re-elected.	▌ ✓ Norma Torres (Democratic); ▌Mike Cargile (Republican)
California 36	D+21	Ted Lieu	Democratic	2014	Incumbent re-elected.	▌ ✓ Ted Lieu (Democratic); ▌Houston Brignano (Republican)
California 37	D+33	Sydney Kamlager-Dove	Democratic	2022	Incumbent re-elected.	▌ ✓ Sydney Kamlager-Dove (Democratic); ▌Samantha Mota (Democratic)
California 38	D+8	None (new seat)			New member elected. Democratic gain.	▌ ✓ Hilda Solis (Democratic); ▌Pedro Casas (Republican)
California 39	D+7	Mark Takano	Democratic	2012	Incumbent re-elected.	▌ ✓ Mark Takano (Democratic); ▌Steve Manos (Republican)
California 40	R+6	Young Kim	Republican	2020	Incumbent lost re-election.	▌ ✓ Ken Calvert (Republican); ▌Young Kim (Republican)
California 40	R+6	Ken Calvert; Redistricted from the 41st district	Republican	1992	Incumbent re-elected. Republican hold.	▌ ✓ Ken Calvert (Republican); ▌Young Kim (Republican)
California 41	D+9	Linda Sánchez; Redistricted from the 38th district	Democratic	2002	Incumbent re-elected.	▌ ✓ Linda Sánchez (Democratic); ▌Mitch Clemmons (Republican)
California 42	D+8	Robert Garcia	Democratic	2022	Incumbent re-elected.	▌ ✓ Robert Garcia (Democratic); ▌Brian Burley (Republican)
California 43	D+27	Maxine Waters	Democratic	1990	Incumbent re-elected.	▌ ✓ Maxine Waters (Democratic); ▌Cristian Morales (Republican)
California 44	D+20	Nanette Barragán	Democratic	2016	Incumbent re-elected.	▌ ✓ Nanette Barragán (Democratic); ▌Genevieve Angel (Republican)
California 45	D+3	Derek Tran	Democratic	2024	Incumbent re-elected.	▌ ✓ Derek Tran (Democratic); ▌Chuong Vo (Republican)
California 46	D+10	Lou Correa	Democratic	2016	Incumbent re-elected.	▌ ✓ Lou Correa (Democratic); ▌David Pan (Republican)
California 47	D+6	Dave Min	Democratic	2024	Incumbent re-elected.	▌Jenny Le Roux (Republican); ▌ ✓ Dave Min (Democratic)
California 48	D+2	Darrell Issa	Republican	2000; 2018 (retired); 2020	Incumbent retired. Democratic gain.	▌Jim Desmond (Republican); ▌ ✓ Marni von Wilpert (Democratic)
California 49	D+7	Mike Levin	Democratic	2018	Incumbent re-elected.	▌ ✓ Mike Levin (Democratic); ▌Armen Kurdian (Republican)
California 50	D+10	Scott Peters	Democratic	2012	Incumbent re-elected.	▌ ✓ Scott Peters (Democratic); ▌Steve Cohen (Republican)
California 51	D+10	Sara Jacobs	Democratic	2020	Incumbent re-elected.	▌ ✓ Sara Jacobs (Democratic); ▌Ricardo Cabrera (Republican)
California 52	D+11	Juan Vargas	Democratic	2012	Incumbent re-elected.	▌ ✓ Juan Vargas (Democratic); ▌Jeff Belle (Republican)
