= Aisha Wahab =

American politician (born 1987)

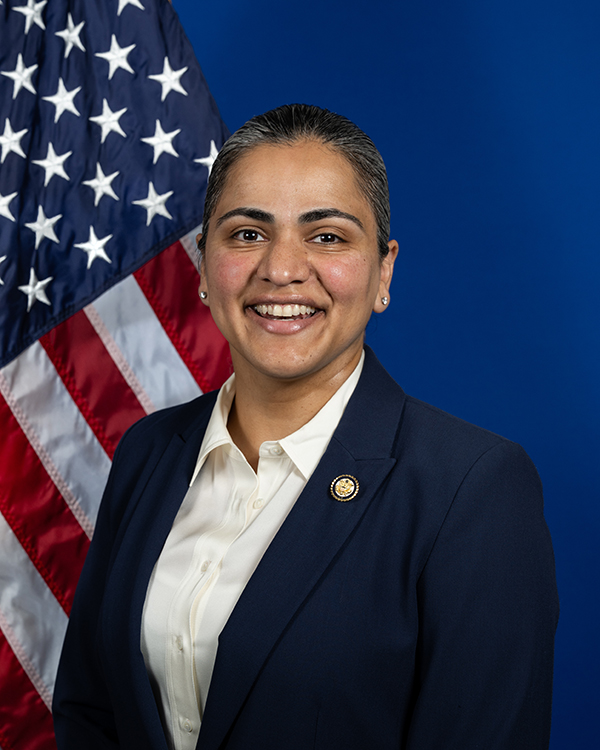
- Official portrait, 2026

Member of the U.S. House of Representatives from California's 14th district
- Incumbent
- Assumed office September 2, 2026
- Preceded by: Eric Swalwell

Member of the California Senate from the 10th district
- In office December 5, 2022 – September 1, 2026
- Preceded by: Bob Wieckowski
- Succeeded by: Scott Sakakihara (elect)

Member of the Hayward City Council
- In office December 11, 2018 – December 5, 2022
- Preceded by: Marvin Peixoto
- Succeeded by: George Syrop
- Constituency: At-large district

Personal details
- Born: January 11, 1987 (age 39) Queens, New York City, U.S.
- Party: Democratic
- Education: Ohlone College (attended); San Jose State University (BA); California State University, East Bay (MBA); University of Southern California (DSW)
- Website: House website Campaign website

Aisha Wahab (Note: /aɪˈiːʃəˈwəˈhɑːb/ eye-EE-shuh wuh-HAHB) (born January 11, 1987) is an American politician who has served as the U.S. representative from California's 14th congressional district since 2026. A member of the Democratic Party, Wahab served as a member of the California State Senate from the 10th district from 2022 to 2026 and on the Hayward City Council from 2018 to 2022. She is among the first Afghan Americans elected to public office in the United States, the first Muslim and Afghan American elected to the California State Senate, and the first Afghan American elected to Congress.

Born to Afghan refugees in New York City, Wahab was raised in Fremont, California. She has a doctorate in social work from the University of Southern California. Before entering politics, she worked in nonprofit organizations and IT consulting. She was elected to the Hayward City Council in 2018 and to the California State Senate in 2022, where she served as assistant majority leader.

Wahab was elected to Congress in a special election to complete the term of Eric Swalwell, who resigned amid allegations of sexual misconduct. Wahab defeated Democratic opponent Melissa Hernandez in both the special election on August 18 and the general election for a two-year term on November 3.

== Early life and education ==
Wahab was born in Queens, New York City, to a Pashtun family from Afghanistan that came to the United States in the 1980s as refugees fleeing the Soviet–Afghan War. Soon after her birth, her father was murdered, and his murder was never solved. Her mother died shortly thereafter, leaving Wahab and her sister in foster care. The sisters were then adopted by a Fremont, California couple sharing the same ethnic background as their biological parents.

Wahab graduated from John F. Kennedy High School and Ohlone College, both in Fremont, before earning a Bachelor of Arts in political science from San Jose State University in 2010. During and after college, she was an account manager and business development director for various startup companies in the San Francisco Bay Area. In 2011, the economic impacts of the Great Recession caused Wahab to lose her job and her parents to lose their business. When Wahab's parents' home was foreclosed on, the family was priced out of Fremont and moved to Hayward, California, where they became renters.

Wahab earned a Master of Business Administration from California State University, East Bay, in 2013. She was involved in student government during graduate school and became an IT consultant after graduation.

In 2024, Wahab completed a doctorate in social work at the USC Suzanne Dworak-Peck School of Social Work.

== Early political career ==
=== Hayward City Council ===
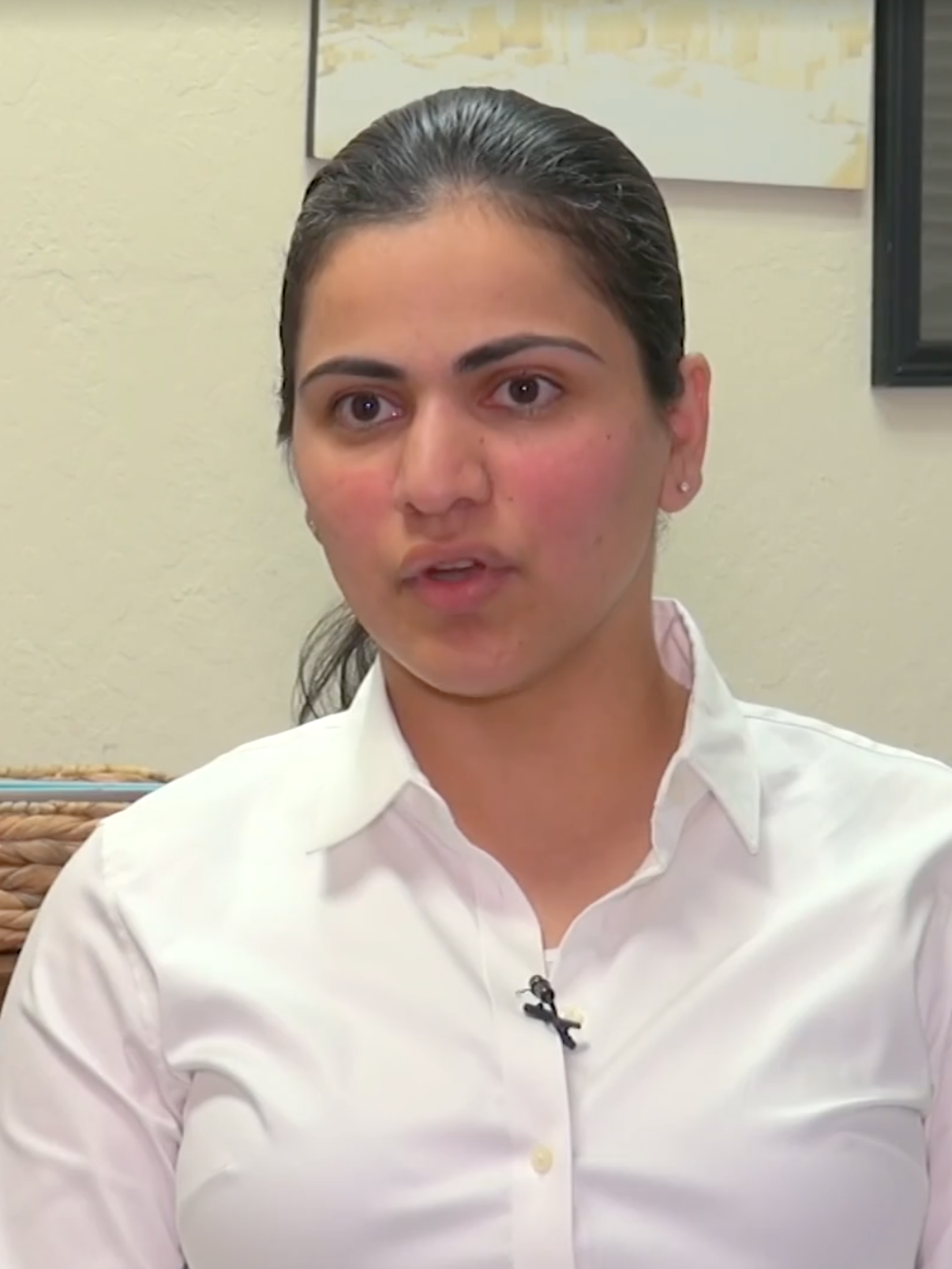
Wahab during an interview with Voice of America's Dari Service, 2018

Wahab ran for Hayward City Council in 2018. She was the top vote-getter in a field of seven candidates vying for an at-large city council seat, beating two incumbents. Along with New Hampshire state representative Safiya Wazir, Wahab was the first Afghan American elected to public office in the United States.

In 2019, California state assemblymember Bill Quirk recognized Wahab as Woman of the Year from Assembly District 20.

Wahab served on the Hayward City Council from 2018 to 2022. She did not run for reelection in 2022, instead successfully running for the California State Senate.

== California State Senate ==
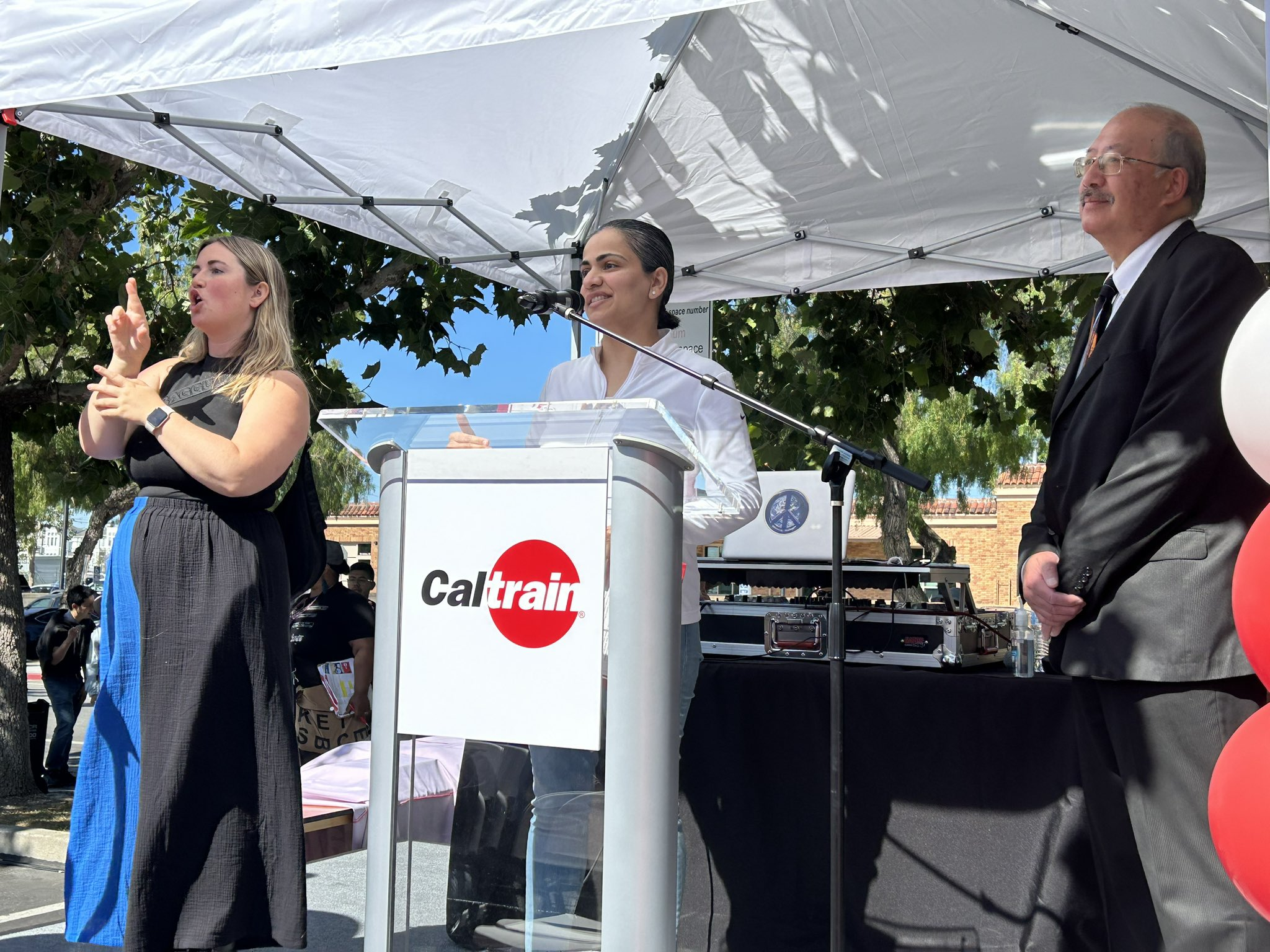
Wahab at the Caltrain Electric Train Tour, 2023

=== 2022 election ===
Wahab announced she would run for the California State Senate in the 10th district, which spans from Hayward to Sunnyvale. Incumbent state senator Bob Wieckowski was term-limited and endorsed Wahab to succeed him. During the campaign, she said she would focus on California's housing crisis and stagnating wages. California state assemblymember Alex Lee, whose district overlaps with Wahab's, and former Federal Election Commission chair Ann Ravel backed her campaign. She advanced to the top-two primary on June 7 and won the general election on November 8, defeating Fremont mayor Lily Mei, a moderate Democrat, in the general election. Her victory made Wahab the first Muslim and Afghan American elected to the California State Senate.

=== Tenure ===
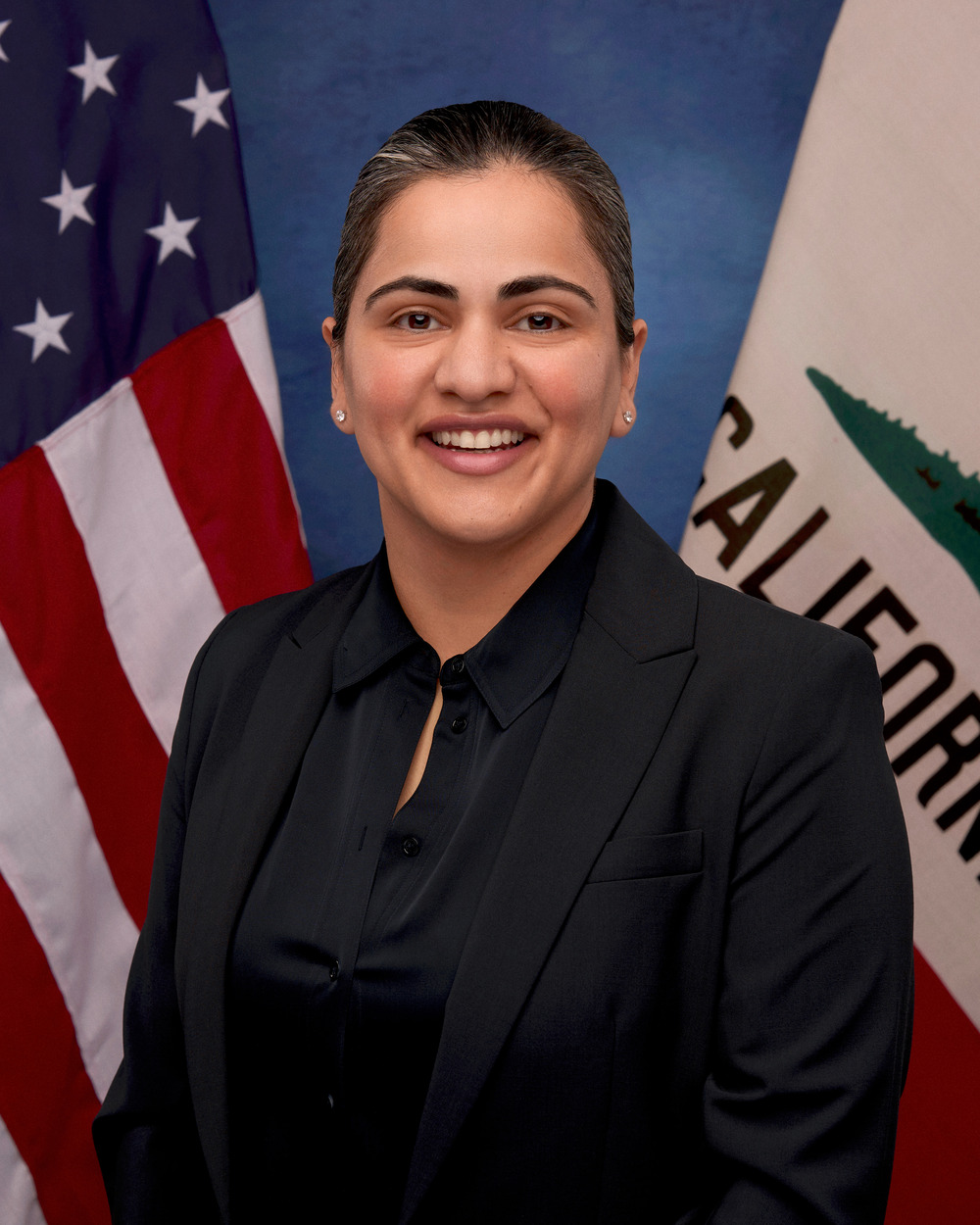
Official State Senate portrait, 2024

Wahab was sworn in as a state senator on December 5, 2022. While in office, Wahab maintained a broad legislative portfolio spanning housing, public safety, health and human services, infrastructure, workforce development, and labor protections. During the 2023–2025 legislative sessions, she authored, principal-coauthored, or coauthored legislation across these policy areas, with dozens of measures enacted into law and others advancing through committee and appropriations processes.

Her housing-related state legislative work includes more than 20 bills addressing tenant protections, rental practices, and housing affordability, alongside committee-level leadership on broader housing policy and infrastructure considerations. She also authored and supported numerous measures focused on foster youth, post-adoption protections, and service delivery standards.

Wahab's health-related legislation included measures expanding access to essential services and addressing equity in public health settings, while her public safety work has addressed firearm safety, traffic enforcement practices, and criminal justice procedures. Additional legislative activity has focused on workforce development, economic security, infrastructure planning, and labor and workplace protections.

Enacted legislation authored by Wahab includes measures addressing tenant security deposits, menstrual equity in schools and public facilities, expanded educational support for foster and homeless youth, post-adoption contact protections, and reforms affecting criminal records and survivor access to justice.

Wahab served as assistant majority leader during the 2026 legislative session. She resigned from the State Senate at the end of that legislative session to take office in the U.S. House of Representatives.

==== Housing ====
In 2023, Wahab authored SB 466, a bill to modify the Costa–Hawkins Rental Housing Act and allow cities to expand rent control. The bill failed to advance. In 2025, she introduced SB 436, which would bar landlords from evicting a tenant for failure to pay rent if the tenant pays back the rent. Wahab has said that parking mandates are necessary for new housing, and has often criticized efforts in California to exempt new housing projects from them.

In 2025, Wahab was named chair of the Senate Housing Committee by Mike McGuire. As chair, she has criticized efforts to increase housing supply in California amid a housing shortage and said in her first hearing as chair that California needs to move away from "development, development, development", expressing skepticism that increased housing supply would lead to lower housing prices. Wahab is a renter and has long criticized new construction without protection for low-income tenants. She has called YIMBY proposals to reduce California's zoning regulations "giveaways to developers".

Wahab initially criticized SB 79, a pro-development bill led by Scott Wiener that would allow apartment buildings near mass transit stations without local control and would override traditional zoning regulations. She said she would support increases in housing supply if developers subsidize more affordable housing and if the housing comes with a minimum number of parking spaces. According to CalMatters, Wahab's opposition to SB 79 "nearly killed" the legislation due to her role as chair of the housing committee. She initially voted against it but voted for it and spoke in favor of it after amendments. It was signed into law by Governor Gavin Newsom.

In testimony before the 2026 Senate Housing Committee, Wahab highlighted the importance of preserving existing affordable housing, including mobile home parks, as part of efforts to address California's housing shortage, noting that several of the state's largest mobile home communities are in her district.

==== Caste discrimination ====
In March 2023, Wahab introduced SB 403, a bill with a broad objective to prohibit caste discrimination. SB 403, which involved adding caste into the definition of ancestry under multiple discrimination laws, passed the California State Senate in May 2023. The bill was considered controversial by some in the South Asian community and Wahab was subject to four recall attempts, none of which had enough signatures to appear on the ballot. The bill's proponents argued that an explicit ban on caste discrimination was needed to increase awareness of such bias, but its opponents, including several Indian American organizations, said the proposal unfairly targeted Hindu residents because the caste system was most commonly associated with them. In October 2023, SB 403 was vetoed by Newsom, who argued that "caste discrimination is already prohibited under existing civil rights protections".

==== Child welfare oversight ====
In April 2024, Wahab, a former foster youth in Alameda County, requested that the Joint Legislative Audit Committee approve a state audit of the Alameda County Department of Children and Family Services (DCFS), writing that she sought the review "due to years of issues within the Department of Children and Family Services within Alameda County's Social Services Agency, especially concerning foster youth" and citing "clear systemic failures and a lack of administrative planning to support foster youth with emerging and complex needs". The request cited earlier controversies, including the 2022 death of eight-year-old Sophia Mason of Hayward, after social workers reportedly missed repeated warnings of abuse.

The committee approved the audit, and in September 2025 California State Auditor Grant Parks released Report 2024-108, which found that the department did not consistently initiate or complete investigations of child abuse and neglect referrals within required time frames, did not always ensure foster youth received timely physical and mental health services, and did not always ensure that youth maintained connections with family members.

At an October 27, 2025, news conference at Hayward City Hall, Wahab joined current and former local officials to demand what she called immediate and measurable reform, calling the department's record "decades of failure" and saying, "This is not mismanagement, it's criminal neglect."

Contending that the county had not acted with sufficient urgency, in December 2025 Wahab's office established the Alameda County DCFS Audit Implementation Taskforce to monitor implementation of the audit's recommendations. Chaired by Wahab, the taskforce brought together state legislators, representatives of the Alameda County Board of Supervisors, subject-matter experts, and community stakeholders, and first met on January 30, 2026. At a February 2026 meeting, a representative of the State Auditor's office told members that the county's claimed corrective actions were self-reported and not documented, and Wahab pressed the county to provide verifiable evidence.

Wahab subsequently urged the California Department of Social Services (CDSS)—the state agency responsible under Welfare and Institutions Code section 10600 for supervising county child welfare systems—to exercise its oversight authority and conduct an on-site review. CDSS conducted the review on March 26, and on July 16, it notified the county that its findings warranted state intervention and monitoring under Welfare and Institutions Code section 10605(e), directing DCFS to develop a corrective action plan to be implemented no later than October 1.

The CDSS report documented systemic deficiencies across nearly every phase of casework. In a sample of front-end referrals, reviewers found that more than two-thirds of "evaluated out" cases had a missing or incomplete risk-assessment tool, and that in a supplemental sample the tool's recommended response time did not match the priority recorded in the state case-management system in roughly 70 percent of referrals—most often downgraded from an immediate to a ten-day response without a documented rationale. Referrals passed through an average of six or more staff before investigation, diffusing accountability, and some new abuse allegations on already open cases were routed to the family's existing social worker rather than an emergency-response worker, contrary to state policy. Reviewers also found that the county's foster-care case plans were largely generic rather than individualized, that timely Child and Family Team meetings occurred in fewer than half of cases reviewed, and that documentation of efforts to place children with relatives frequently ended at identification with no record of follow-through. The report attributed much of this to a sustained workforce crisis—vacancies, high turnover, and unsustainable caseloads concentrated in the Emergency Response Unit—and directed the county to develop a Corrective Action Plan, subject to CDSS approval and ongoing on-site monitoring.

==== Alameda County Discretionary Funds Transparency Act ====
In February 2026, Wahab introduced Senate Bill 1193, the Alameda County Discretionary Funds Transparency Act, which would require the Alameda County Board of Supervisors to approve discretionary fund awards to community organizations, nonprofits, and private entities by majority vote, publish a quarterly log of such expenditures, and bar supervisors from awarding the funds within 90 days of an election in which they appear on the ballot. Modeled on transparency rules already applied to Orange County, the bill applies only to Alameda County. Wahab said it established "a simple standard: public money, public process, public trust."

Wahab framed the bill as a response to what she called a long documented record of governance concerns rather than any single incident. According to her office, a 2016–2017 Alameda County Civil Grand Jury report on the Board's discretionary spending concluded that the process "constitutes a failure of good governance practices", and the Board adopted only one of that report's recommendations, declining the remainder, including a proposed cap on discretionary grants. Wahab said the bill was intended to "prevent waste, fraud, abuse, favoritism, and conflicts of interest before they become scandal", calling the county's history "a pattern" rather than "one old incident". Local reporting noted that Wahab had not publicly alleged specific misuse of funds by any named supervisor, instead citing grand jury reports, audits, and legal filings as evidence of a systemic pattern.

The Alameda County Board of Supervisors voted unanimously in April 2026 to formally oppose it. Supervisor David Haubert publicly criticized the measure, and Supervisor Nate Miley said the county might challenge it in court. Wahab disputed that the bill would delay nonprofit funding and rejected suggestions that it was introduced as political retaliation.

The bill advanced through the Legislature without a recorded dissenting vote, passing the full State Senate 37–0 in May and clearing the Assembly Local Government Committee 9–0 in July. As of July 2026 it is awaiting a vote on the Assembly floor, which must occur before the Legislature's constitutional deadline for passing bills at the end of the two-year session; if passed, it will return to the Senate for concurrence in amendments before going to the governor.

== U.S. House of Representatives ==
=== 2020 congressional campaign ===
After incumbent U.S. representative Eric Swalwell announced he would run in the 2020 Democratic Party presidential primaries, Wahab announced she would run to replace him in California's 15th congressional district. Her support for progressive policies such as Medicare for All and identity as a millennial women of color led to comparisons to Alexandria Ocasio-Cortez. Swalwell then ended his presidential campaign and ran for re-election to Congress, leading Wahab to suspend her campaign three weeks later.

=== 2026 congressional campaigns ===
Wahab being sworn in by U.S. House Speaker Mike Johnson, September 2026.

On January 24, 2026, Wahab announced that she would run in the 2026 U.S. House of Representatives election in California's 14th congressional district after the incumbent, Eric Swalwell, announced his candidacy for governor of California in the 2026 election. Swalwell later suspended his campaign, and on April 14 resigned from Congress due to allegations of sexual misconduct, leading Newsom to call a special election. State party leaders attempted to nominate former state senator Bob Wieckowski to serve in a "caretaker" role, avoiding the possibility of a runoff and thus a prolonging of the vacancy in Swalwell's former district. Wiecowski said he would run only if endorsed by all major contenders. Wahab did not endorse him, instead declaring her candidacy in the special election.

In the June 2 primary election for the next term, Wahab led a field of nine candidates with 38.3% of the vote. She received support from the California Democratic Party, the Congressional Progressive Caucus, and the state chapter of the Service Employees International Union. She advanced to the general election against fellow Democrat Melissa Hernandez, the former mayor of Dublin, who finished with 17.2% of the vote ahead of Republican candidate Wendy Huang. In the first round of the special election on June 16, Wahab again led with 42.8% of the vote. Failing to receive a majority, she advanced to the August 18 runoff against Hernandez.

Wahab was seen as the favorite in the runoff. Hernandez received substantial support from the pro-Israel lobby in the closing days of the race, including more than $5 million in funding from two super PACs affiliated with AIPAC. The runoff was closer than originally anticipated, with no winner declared until August 20, when Wahab was declared the winner, with 53.1% of the vote. She defeated Hernandez again in the general election in November to win a full two-year term.

=== Tenure ===
Wahab took office during the 119th Congress on September 2, 2026. She is the first Afghan American member of the United States Congress.

== Electoral history ==
Electoral history of Aisha Wahab
Year	Office		Party	Primary			General			Result	Swing	Ref.
Year	Office		Party	Total	%	P.	Total	%	P.	Result	Swing	Ref.
2018	Hayward City Council		Nonpartisan				15,949	27.22	1st	Won	N/A	
2022	California State Senate	10th	Democratic	42,731	30	2nd	114,997	53.7	1st	Won	Hold	
2026 (special)	U.S. House	14th	Democratic	52,961	42.8	1st	51, 610	53.1	1st	Won	Hold	
2026	U.S. House	14th	Democratic	59,238	38.28	1st	TBD					
Source: Secretary of State of California | Statewide Election Results

== See also ==
- List of Muslim members of the United States Congress

== Notes ==
U.S. House of Representatives
Preceded by Eric Swalwell	Member of the U.S. House of Representatives from California's 14th congressional district 2026–present	Incumbent
U.S. order of precedence (ceremonial)
Preceded by Everton Blair	United States representatives by seniority 433rd	Succeeded by Eleanor Holmes Norton as U.S. Delegate
