= Bill Harrison (politician) =

American accountant and politician

Mayor of Fremont, California
- In office December 2012 – December 2016
- Preceded by: Gus Morrison
- Succeeded by: Lily Mei

Personal details
- Political party: Democratic

Bill Harrison is an American accountant and politician who was the mayor of Fremont, California, between December 2012 and December 2016, succeeding appointed mayor Gus Morrison.

== Background and career ==
He was born and raised in Fremont, is a graduate of University of California, Santa Barbara, and is a certified public accountant.

Prior to 2012, Harrison was a city councilman. On November 6, 2012, Harrison out-polled four rivals to win the independently elected mayor's office with 34% of the vote.
