= Gus Morrison =

American politician (1934/1935–2023)

Mayor of Fremont, California
- In office January 30, 2012 – 2013
- Preceded by: Bob Wasserman
- Succeeded by: Bill Harrison

Mayor of Fremont, California
- In office 1994 – December 2004
- Preceded by: Bill Ball
- Succeeded by: Bob Wasserman

Mayor of Fremont, California
- In office 1985–1989
- Preceded by: Leon Mezzetti
- Succeeded by: Bill Ball

Personal details
- Born: 1934/1935 Buffalo, New York, U.S.
- Died: December 14, 2023 (aged 88)
- Spouse: Joy
- Children: Three
- Education: San Jose State University

Gus Morrison (1934/1935 – December 14, 2023) was an American politician and engineer. Morrison served as the Mayor of Fremont, California, for three different tenures: 1985 to 1989, 1994 to 2004, and 2012. On January 30, 2012, Morrison was appointed Mayor by the Fremont City Council following the death of his predecessor, the late Bob Wasserman, effective immediately. He was inaugurated into office to complete the remainder of Wasserman's unexpired term (ending in December 2012) on January 31, 2012.

== Life and career ==
Morrison was first elected to the Fremont City Council in 1978. He ran for Fremont mayor in 1980, losing to Leon Mezzetti. He defeated Mezzetti in a rematch in 1985, serving for two electoral cycles before being defeated by Bill Ball in 1989, narrowly losing with 10,436 votes to Ball's 10,868 votes. In 1994, Morrison defeated incumbent Mayor Bill Ball in a rematch of the 1989 mayoral election. Morrison narrowly won with 20,811 votes to Ball's 20,376 votes.

Between 2004 and 2012, Morrison worked as a political consultant.

Morrison died on December 14, 2023, at the age of 88.
