= Bob Wieckowski =

American attorney and politician

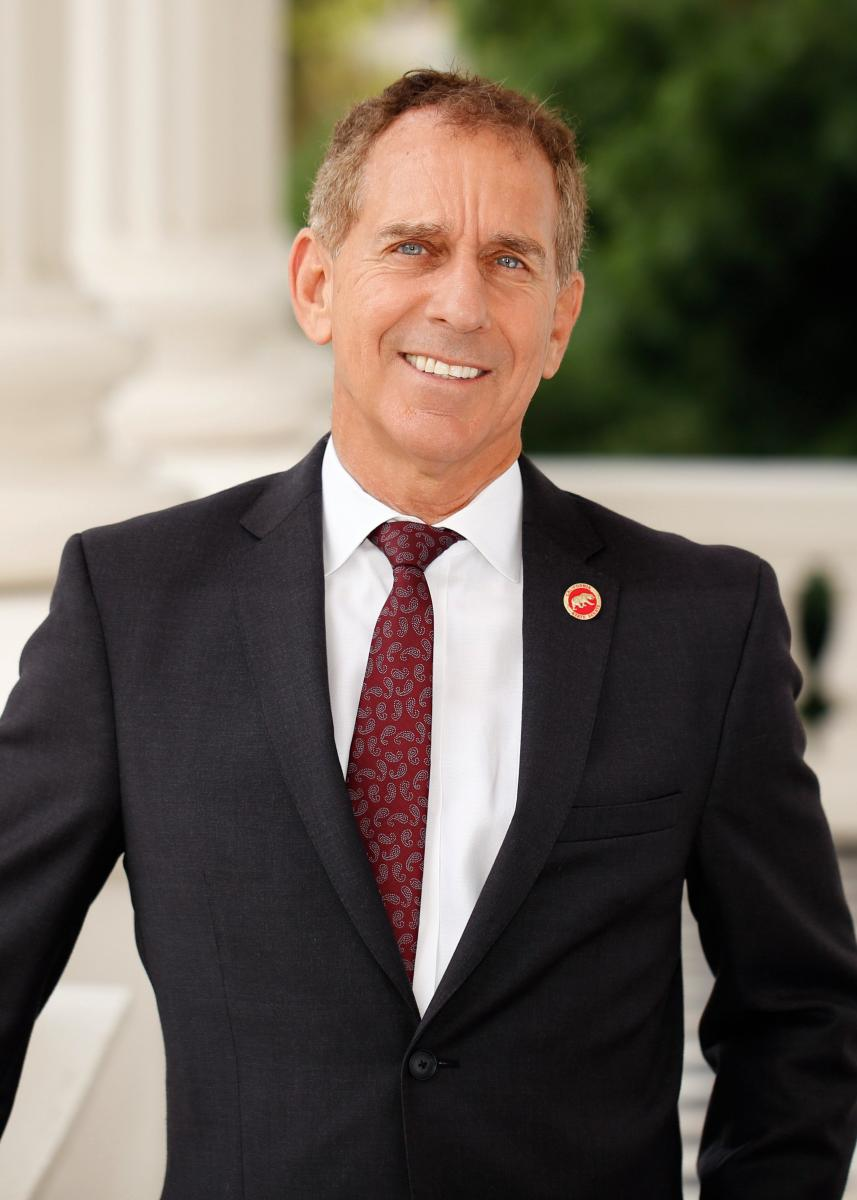
- Official portrait, 2017

Member of the California State Senate from the 10th district
- In office December 1, 2014 – December 4, 2022
- Preceded by: Ellen Corbett
- Succeeded by: Aisha Wahab

Member of the California State Assembly
- In office December 6, 2010 – November 30, 2014
- Preceded by: Alberto Torrico
- Succeeded by: Kansen Chu
- Constituency: 20th district (2010–2012); 25th district (2012–2014)

Personal details
- Born: February 18, 1955 (age 71) San Francisco, California, U.S.
- Party: Democratic
- Spouse: Sue Lemke (m. 2015)
- Education: University of California, Berkeley (BA); Santa Clara University (JD)
- Website: State Senate district

Robert Anthony Wieckowski (born February 18, 1955) is an American attorney and politician who served in the California State Senate from 2014 to 2022. A Democrat, he represented the 10th Senate District, which encompassed the central and southern portions of the East Bay and South Bay. He previously served in the State Assembly from 2010 to 2014.

He announced a bid to replace Eric Swalwell as the representative for California's 15th congressional district, but dropped out a few weeks later.

== Biography ==
Wieckowski is a small business owner and a bankruptcy attorney. He received his B.A. from University of California, Berkeley and his J.D. from Santa Clara University Law School.

Wieckowski was first elected to the California State Assembly in 2010 to represent the 20th Assembly District, then the 25th Assembly District in 2012 after redistricting. Before being elected to the State Legislature, he served as vice mayor and a city councilor for District A in Fremont from December 6, 2004, to December 6, 2010, preceded by Bill Pease and succeeded by Dominic Dutra.

Wieckowski served as chair of the Assembly Judiciary Committee. He was also a member of the Assembly Insurance, Health, and Public Employees, Retirement and Social Security committees.

In his first term in office, Wieckowski passed 24 bills through the legislature, 21 of which were signed into law by California Governor Jerry Brown. He launched the Made in California Jobs Initiative to expand California manufacturing, invest in biotechnology research, and fight for small businesses.

Wieckowski lives in Fremont with his wife, Sue Lemke, and her son Luke. Wieckowski's parents are Gene and Helen Wieckowski.

Wieckowski left office on December 4, 2022, due to term limits, and was succeeded by Aisha Wahab. After leaving office, he returned to his law practice as a bankruptcy attorney.
