= California's 10th senatorial district =

American legislative district

California's 10th State Senate district
- Current senator: Vacant
- Population (2010) • Voting age • Citizen voting age: 923,707; 704,066; 524,928
- Demographics: 25.41% White; 5.98% Black; 24.33% Latino; 41.12% Asian; 0.48% Native American; 1.15% Hawaiian/Pacific Islander; 0.26% other; 1.26% remainder of multiracial
- Registered voters: 482,785
- Registration: 51.03% Democratic; 13.67% Republican; 31.28% No party preference

California's 10th senatorial district is one of 40 California State Senate districts. It is currently vacant after Aisha Wahab resigned to become a U.S. Representative.

== District profile ==
The district includes the East Bay in Alameda County and the northwestern corner of Silicon Valley in Santa Clara County, including Fremont, Hayward, Union City, Newark, Milpitas, Sunnyvale, and Santa Clara.

== Election results from statewide races ==
Year	Office	Results
2021	Recall	No 74.1 – 25.9%
2020	President	Biden 73.2 – 24.8%
2018	Governor	Newsom 73.2 – 26.8%
2018	Senator	Feinstein 59.3 – 40.7%
2016	President	Clinton 74.7 – 19.8%
2016	Senator	Harris 67.3 – 32.7%
2014	Governor	Brown 76.1 – 23.9%
2012	President	Obama 74.3 – 23.4%
2012	Senator	Feinstein 76.9 – 23.1%

Election results from statewide races
Year	Office	Results
2002	Governor	Davis 60.9 - 29.7%
2000	President	Gore 63.5 - 32.4%
2000	Senator	Feinstein 64.3 - 30.0%
1998	Governor	Davis 66.0 - 29.9%
1998	Senator	Boxer 60.4 - 36.2%
1996	President	Clinton 58.6 - 30.0%
1994	Governor	Brown 48.5 - 47.2%
1994	Senator	Feinstein 57.3 - 35.0%
1992	President	Clinton 61.3 - 27.2%
1992	Senator	Boxer 55.8 - 33.5%
1992	Senator	Feinstein 64.3 - 28.7%

== List of senators representing the district ==
Due to redistricting, the 10th district has been moved around different parts of the state. The current iteration resulted from the 2021 redistricting by the California Citizens Redistricting Commission.

Senators	Party	Years served	Counties represented	Notes
John H. Dickinson	Republican	January 5, 1880 – January 8, 1883	San Francisco	Dickinson and Neumann served together.
Paul Neumann	Republican	January 5, 1880 – January 8, 1883	San Francisco	Dickinson and Neumann served together.
George H. Perry	Republican	January 8, 1883 – January 3, 1887	San Francisco	Perry and McClure served together.
David McClure	Republican	January 8, 1883 – January 3, 1887	San Francisco	Perry and McClure served together.
Edward C. Hinshaw	Democratic	January 3, 1887 – January 5, 1891	Sonoma	
James W. Ragsdale	Republican	January 5, 1891 – January 7, 1895	Sonoma	
John Charles Holloway	Republican	January 7, 1895 – January 2, 1899	Sonoma	
James C. Sims	Democratic	January 2, 1899 – January 5, 1903	Sonoma	
William Chapman Ralston, Jr.	Republican	January 5, 1903 – January 7, 1907	Alpine, Amador, Calaveras, El Dorado, Mono	
Anthony Caminetti	Democratic	January 7, 1907 – January 4, 1915	Alpine, Amador, Calaveras, El Dorado, Mono	
James Wilson Struckenbruck	Democratic	January 4, 1915 – January 6, 1919	San Joaquin	
Frank S. Boggs	Democratic	January 6, 1919 – January 5, 1931	Amador, San Joaquin	
William P. Rich	Republican	January 5, 1931 – January 8, 1951	Sutter, Yuba County, California	
Edward C. Johnson	Republican	January 8, 1951 – January 7, 1963	Sutter, Yuba County, California	
Harold Thomas Sedgwick	Republican	January 7, 1963 – January 2, 1967	Sutter, Yuba County, California	
George Moscone	Democratic	January 2, 1967 – November 30, 1974	San Francisco	
Arlen F. Gregorio	Democratic	December 2, 1974 – November 30, 1978	San Mateo, Santa Clara	
Marz Garcia	Republican	December 4, 1978 – November 30, 1982	Los Angeles	
Bill Lockyer	Democratic	December 6, 1982 – November 30, 1998	Alameda	
Bill Lockyer	Democratic	December 6, 1982 – November 30, 1998	Alameda, Santa Clara	
Liz Figueroa	Democratic	December 7, 1998 – November 30, 2006	Alameda, Santa Clara	
Ellen Corbett	Democratic	December 4, 2006 – November 30, 2014	Alameda, Santa Clara	
Bob Wieckowski	Democratic	December 1, 2014 – November 30, 2022	Alameda, Santa Clara	
Aisha Wahab	Democratic	December 4, 2022 – September 1, 2026	Alameda, Santa Clara	Resigned after winning the CA-14 special election
Vacant		September 1, 2026 – present	Alameda, Santa Clara	

== Election results (1990-present) ==
=== 2022 ===
2022 California State Senate 10th district election
Primary election
Party	Candidate	Votes	%
Democratic	Lily Mei	47,149	33.1
Democratic	Aisha Wahab	42,731	30.0
Republican	Paul J. Pimentel	30,742	21.6
Democratic	Jamal Khan	10,424	7.3
Democratic	Raymond Liu	6,932	4.9
Democratic	Jim Canova	4,391	3.1
Total votes		142,369	100.0
General election
Democratic	Aisha Wahab	114,997	53.7
Democratic	Lily Mei	99,011	46.3
Total votes		214,008	100.0
Democratic hold			

=== 2018 ===
2018 California State Senate 10th district election
Primary election
Party	Candidate	Votes	%
Democratic	Bob Wieckowski (incumbent)	102,122	71.5
Republican	Victor G. San Vicente	34,357	24.0
Libertarian	Ali Sarsak	6,420	4.5
Total votes		142,899	100.0
General election
Democratic	Bob Wieckowski (incumbent)	205,239	75.6
Republican	Victor G. San Vicente	66,156	24.4
Total votes		271,395	100.0
Democratic hold			

=== 2014 ===
2014 California State Senate 10th district election
Primary election
Party	Candidate	Votes	%
Democratic	Bob Wieckowski	36,773	35.4
Republican	Peter Kuo	27,332	26.3
Democratic	Mary Hayashi	21,448	20.6
Democratic	Roman Reed	14,098	13.6
No party preference	Audie Bock	4,284	4.1
Total votes		103,935	100.0
General election
Democratic	Bob Wieckowski	111,162	68.0
Republican	Peter Kuo	52,302	32.0
Total votes		163,464	100.0
Democratic hold			

=== 2010 ===
2010 California State Senate 10th district election
Party	Candidate	Votes	%
Democratic	Ellen Corbett (incumbent)	139,799	66.6
Republican	Rob Maffit	58,262	27.8
American Independent	Ivan Chou	11,871	5.6
Total votes		209,932	100.0
Democratic hold			

=== 2006 ===
2006 California State Senate 10th district election
Party	Candidate	Votes	%
Democratic	Ellen Corbett	136,846	73.4
Republican	Lou Filipovich	49,638	26.6
Total votes		186,484	100.0
Democratic hold			

=== 2002 ===
2002 California State Senate 10th district election
Party	Candidate	Votes	%
Democratic	Liz Figueroa (incumbent)	103,247	66.9
Republican	James G. Gunther	46,056	29.8
Libertarian	Ervan Darnell	4,997	3.2
Total votes		154,300	100.0
Democratic hold			

=== 1998 ===
1998 California State Senate 10th district election
Party	Candidate	Votes	%
Democratic	Liz Figueroa	129,496	68.7
Republican	Bob Gough	59,071	31.3
Total votes		188,567	100.0
Democratic hold			

=== 1994 ===
1994 California State Senate 10th district election
Party	Candidate	Votes	%
Democratic	Bill Lockyer (incumbent)	124,365	63.0
Republican	Anthony R. Smith Sr.	73,141	37.0
Total votes		197,506	100.0
Democratic hold			

=== 1990 ===
1990 California State Senate 10th district election
Party	Candidate	Votes	%
Democratic	Bill Lockyer (incumbent)	111,253	60.6
Republican	Howard Hertz	72,390	39.4
Total votes		183,643	100.0
Democratic hold			

== See also ==
- California State Senate
- California State Senate districts
- Districts in California
