= Bob Wasserman =

American politician (1934–2011)

Mayor of Fremont, California
- In office December 2004 – December 29, 2011
- Preceded by: Gus Morrison
- Succeeded by: Anu Natarajan (interim until Jan. 30, 2012); Gus Morrison

Personal details
- Born: January 12, 1934 Gary, Indiana
- Died: December 29, 2011 (aged 77) Fremont, California
- Party: Democratic
- Spouse: Linda Wasserman
- Children: Dan and Jill
- Education: California State University, Los Angeles; University of Southern California
- Profession: Police chief; politician

Robert "Bob" Wasserman (January 12, 1934 – December 29, 2011) was an American politician and retired police chief, who served as the Mayor of Fremont, California, from 2004 to 2011. He has been credited with integrating Fremont's economy and workforce into the larger Silicon Valley during his tenures as mayor and a city councilman.

== Biography ==
=== Early life ===
Wasserman was born in Gary, Indiana, on January 12, 1934, to Morris and Alice Wasserman. He moved with his family to Los Angeles when he was three years old, and attended schools in the city. Wasserman served in the U.S. Army National Guard in 1949 when he was just 16 years old. He falsely told the army recruiter that he was 18 years old at the time of his enlistment. He was honorably discharged in 1952 after serving in the Korean War. Following his discharge, Wasserman joined the California National Guard, where he served as a military police inspector and rose to the rank of sergeant first class.

Wasserman continued his education during the early 1950s. He obtained a bachelor's degree in political science and administration from California State University, Los Angeles. Wasserman also received a master's degree in public administration from the University of Southern California.

Wasserman met his future wife, Linda, while working for the Montebello, California, police department. (She was also a Montebello municipal employee at the time). They married at a ceremony at the Montebello city hall in 1958 and had two children: Daniel, born in 1963, and Jill, born in 1966.

=== Career ===
Wasserman began his career in law enforcement when he joined the Montebello, California, Police Department as a police officer in 1953. He held positions in police departments throughout Southern California during the 1950s, 60s and 70s.

Wasserman moved to San Carlos, California in 1969 to become the chief of the San Carlos Police Department. He and his family returned to Southern California in 1972 to become police chief of the Brea Police Department, which encompassed Brea and Yorba Linda.

Wasserman was hired as the police chief of Fremont, California, in 1976. He remained in the position until his retirement in 1992. Former Fremont Police Captain Mike Lanam noted in 2012 that Wasserman, "took a fledgling department and brought it to state and national prominence." Wasserman was named Law Enforcement Executive of the Year and served as president of the California Peace Officers’ Association. In the 1980s, Wasserman was appointed to a national law enforcement task force serving as Chief of Staff of the White House National Drug Control policy, by U.S. President Ronald Reagan.

Wasserman also served as the Deputy Commissioner of Interpol task force, during the United States involvement in Bosnia, and was directly reported to by the contingent commander overseeing operations there.

Wasserman launched a political career in the years prior and was first elected to the Fremont city council in 1992. During the 1990s and 2000s, Wasserman watched Fremont transition to an integral part of the Silicon Valley from a quiet, small East Bay city. By 1999, 750 high tech companies were headquartered in Fremont, including Lam Research, Cirrus Logic and Premisys Communications. Fifteen of top one hundred fastest growing companies in the San Francisco Bay Area were also located in Fremont by the same year. Wasserman and other members of the city government were credited with attracting them to Fremont.

=== Mayor of Fremont ===
In 2004, incumbent Mayor Gus Morrison was term limited from seeking re-election. Wasserman, a member of the city council, announced his candidacy for mayor. Wasserman won the mayoral election on November 2, 2004, with 26,763 votes, or 52.6 percent of the popular vote, defeating fellow city councilman, Bill Pease. He was inaugurated in December 2004.

He was re-elected to a second, four-year term on November 4, 2008. Wasserman won the 2008 election with 42% of the vote, defeating city councilman Steve Cho, who took 32%, and former Mayor Gus Morrison, who garnered 21%.

Wasserman has been credited with developing a new general plan for the city. He recruited technology corporations from Silicon Valley, as well as companies from other industries, to move into Fremont. He also spearheaded efforts to build a Bay Area Rapid Transit station in the Warm Springs District of Fremont, which under construction, as of 2012. Other major projects attributed to Wasserman included the completion of the Pacific Commons shopping center, the Niles Town Plaza, the Aqua Adventure Water Park and the Washington Grade Separation. A new skatepark, which Wasserman supported is also under construction near Fremont Central Park.

In 2005, Wasserman, a Democrat, appointed Republican Dirk Lorenz to the Fremont Planning Commission, despite Lorenz's past opposition to Wasserman's mayoral candidacy.

Wasserman was a strong proponent of moving the Oakland A's Major League Baseball team from Oakland to Fremont. In 2006, Wasserman and Alameda County Supervisor Scott Haggerty sent a joint letter to Oakland A's co-owner Lew Wolff asking him to move the team to a proposed stadium in Fremont, to be called Cisco Field. However, the proposal fell through in 2009 through a combination of opposition from Fremont residents and business groups, as well as the Great Recession. The proposed stadium's proximity to the Don Edwards San Francisco Bay National Wildlife Refuge and San Francisco Bay also drew criticism from critics. Under pressure, Wolff withdrew from the plans, which would have included the construction of a new $1.8 billion, 32,000 seat baseball stadium, on February 24, 2009.

Wasserman lobbied to keep the New United Motor Manufacturing, Inc (NUMMI) from closing in 2010. However, the NUMMI factory, a joint venture between General Motors and Toyota, closed on April 1, 2010, leading to job losses. Wasserman facilitated efforts to find new owners for the plant. The city successfully recruited Tesla Motors to open a production facility, called the Tesla Factory, at the plant later in 2010. Tesla now uses a portion of the land at the Tesla Factory to manufacture the Tesla Model S, an electric vehicle sedan.

The mayor helped pass a city council resolution in opposition to California Proposition 8, a state ballot initiative which banned same sex marriage, in 2008.

== Final years ==
Wasserman had been hospitalized for pneumonia in 2005 and 2008. After the 2008 hospitalization, he brought an oxygen tank with him to city council meetings.

Wasserman died of respiratory complications at the age of 77 on December 29, 2011, at Kaiser Hospital in Fremont. He had been in the hospital for the treatment of respiratory problems. He was survived by his wife of 53 years, Linda, and their two children, Jill and Dan. A funeral for the mayor, attended by 1,200 people, was held at the Harbor Light Church in Fremont on January 6, 2012. Dignitaries included state Sen. Ellen Corbett, law enforcement officers from throughout the region, mayors, business and political leaders, and the Alameda County Board of Supervisors.

Fremont Vice Mayor Anu Natarajan became interim Mayor until the city council could name a permanent replacement.
