= California's 14th congressional district =

U.S. House district for California

Coordinates: 37.5°N 122.4°W

- Interactive map of district boundaries
- Representative: Aisha Wahab; D–Hayward
- Population (2025): 727,630
- Median household income: $147,041
- Ethnicity: 38.0% Asian; 25.6% White; 24.8% Hispanic; 5.1% Black; 4.6% Two or more races; 1.1% Pacific Islander Americans; 0.8% other
- Cook PVI: D+20

California's 14th congressional district is a congressional district in the U.S. state of California. It is currently represented by Aisha Wahab, a Democrat from Hayward, who took office on September 2, 2026. Wahab won a special election to fill the vacancy left by the resignation of Eric Swalwell, who resigned amid allegations of rape and sexual misconduct.

As of 2022, the 14th district is in Alameda County and includes the cities of Hayward, Pleasanton, Livermore, Union City, Castro Valley, and parts of Dublin and Fremont. Immediately prior to that, the district included most of San Mateo County and the southwest side of San Francisco.

With a Cook Partisan Voting Index of D+20, the district is tied with California's 29th congressional district as the 13th most liberal out of the 52 districts in California.

== Recent election results from statewide races ==
=== 2023–2027 boundaries ===
Year	Office	Results
2008	President	Obama 70–30%
2010	Governor	Brown 62–34%
2010	Lt. Governor	Newsom 61–32%
2010	Secretary of State	Bowen 62–30%
2010	Attorney General	Harris 56–37%
2010	Treasurer	Lockyer 66–28%
2010	Controller	Chiang 63–29%
2012	President	Obama 71–29%
2014	Governor	Brown 71–29%
2016	President	Clinton 71–23%
2018	Governor	Newsom 70–30%
2018	Attorney General	Becerra 71–29%
2020	President	Biden 72–26%
2022	Senate (Reg.)	Padilla 70–30%
2022	Governor	Newsom 68–32%
2022	Lt. Governor	Kounalakis 69–31%
2022	Secretary of State	Weber 69–31%
2022	Attorney General	Bonta 67–33%
2022	Treasurer	Ma 68–32%
2022	Controller	Cohen 63–37%
2024	President	Harris 66–30%
2024	Senate (Reg.)	Schiff 67–33%

== Composition ==
FIPS County Code	County	Seat	Population
1	Alameda	Oakland	1,648,556

Due to the 2020 redistricting, California's 14th congressional district has been shifted geographically to the East Bay. It encompasses most of Alameda County, except for the Oakland Area and the Tri-City Area, which are taken in by the 12th district and 17th district respectively. The 14th district includes the north side of the city of Fremont; the western part of the city of Dublin; portions of San Leandro; the cities of Hayward, Livermore, Pleasanton, and Union City; and the census-designated places Ashland, San Lorenzo, Cherryland, Fairview, Castro Valley, and Sunol.

The 14th district and the 12th are partitioned by Grant Ave, Union Pacific, Lewelling Blvd, Wicks Blvd, Manor Blvd, Juniper St, Dayton Ave, Padre Ave, Fargo Ave, Edgemoor St, Trojan Ave, Beatty St, Fleming St, Highway 880, Floresta Blvd, Halcyon Dr, Hesperian Blvd, Thornally Dr, Highway 185, 150th Ave, Highway 580, Benedict Dr, San Leandro Creek, and Lake Chabot Regional Park. The 14th district and the 17th are partitioned by Mission Peak Regional Park, Witherly Ln, Mission Blvd, Washington Blvd, Farallon Cmn, Paseo Padre Parkway, Grimmer Blvd, Blacow Rd, Omar St, Butano Park Dr, Farina Ln, Nimitz Freeway, Highway 84.

=== Cities and CDPs with 10,000 or more people ===
- Fremont – 230,504
- Hayward – 162,954
- San Leandro – 91,008
- Livermore – 87,955
- Pleasanton – 79,871
- Dublin – 72,589
- Union City – 70,143
- Castro Valley – 66,441
- San Lorenzo – 29,581
- Ashland – 23,823
- Cherryland – 15,808
- Fairview – 11,341

== List of members representing the district ==
Member	Party	Dates	Cong ress(es)	Electoral history	Counties
District created March 4, 1933
Thomas F. Ford (Los Angeles)	Democratic	March 4, 1933 – January 3, 1945	73rd 74th 75th 76th 77th 78th	Elected in 1932. Re-elected in 1934. Re-elected in 1936. Re-elected in 1938. Re-elected in 1940. Re-elected in 1942. Retired.	1933–1953; Los Angeles
Helen Gahagan Douglas (Los Angeles)	Democratic	January 3, 1945 – January 3, 1951	79th 80th 81st	Elected in 1944. Re-elected in 1946. Re-elected in 1948. Retired to run for U.S. Senator.	1933–1953; Los Angeles
Sam Yorty (Los Angeles)	Democratic	January 3, 1951 – January 3, 1953	82nd	Elected in 1950. Redistricted to the 26th district.	1933–1953; Los Angeles
Harlan Hagen (Hanford)	Democratic	January 3, 1953 – January 3, 1963	83rd 84th 85th 86th 87th	Elected in 1952. Re-elected in 1954. Re-elected in 1956. Re-elected in 1958. Re-elected in 1960. Redistricted to the 18th district.	1953–1963; Kern, Kings, Tulare
John F. Baldwin Jr. (Martinez)	Republican	January 3, 1963 – March 9, 1966	88th 89th	Redistricted from the 6th district and re-elected in 1962. Re-elected in 1964. Died.	1963–1975; Contra Costa
Vacant		March 9, 1966 – June 7, 1966	89th		1963–1975; Contra Costa
Jerome Waldie (Antioch)	Democratic	June 7, 1966 – January 3, 1975	89th 90th 91st 92nd 93rd	Elected to finish Baldwin's term. Re-elected in 1966. Re-elected in 1968. Re-elected in 1970. Re-elected in 1972. Retired to run for Governor of California.	1963–1975; Contra Costa
John J. McFall (Manteca)	Democratic	January 3, 1975 – December 31, 1978	94th 95th	Redistricted from the 15th district and re-elected in 1974. Re-elected in 1976. Lost re-election and resigned.	1975–1983; Alameda, Amador, Calaveras, El Dorado, Mono, San Joaquin, Stanislaus, Tuolumne
Vacant		December 31, 1978 – January 3, 1979	95th		1975–1983; Alameda, Amador, Calaveras, El Dorado, Mono, San Joaquin, Stanislaus, Tuolumne
Norman D. Shumway (Stockton)	Republican	January 3, 1979 – January 3, 1991	96th 97th 98th 99th 100th 101st	Elected in 1978. Re-elected in 1980. Re-elected in 1982. Re-elected in 1984. Re-elected in 1986. Re-elected in 1988. Retired.	1975–1983; Alameda, Amador, Calaveras, El Dorado, Mono, San Joaquin, Stanislaus, Tuolumne
Norman D. Shumway (Stockton)	Republican	January 3, 1979 – January 3, 1991	96th 97th 98th 99th 100th 101st	Elected in 1978. Re-elected in 1980. Re-elected in 1982. Re-elected in 1984. Re-elected in 1986. Re-elected in 1988. Retired.	1983–1993; Alpine, Amador, El Dorado, Lassen, Modoc, Nevada, Placer, Plumas, San Joaquin, Sierra
John Doolittle (Rocklin)	Republican	January 3, 1991 – January 3, 1993	102nd	Elected in 1990. Redistricted to the 4th district.	1983–1993; Alpine, Amador, El Dorado, Lassen, Modoc, Nevada, Placer, Plumas, San Joaquin, Sierra
Anna Eshoo (Atherton)	Democratic	January 3, 1993 – January 3, 2013	103rd 104th 105th 106th 107th 108th 109th 110th 111th 112th	Elected in 1992. Re-elected in 1994. Re-elected in 1996. Re-elected in 1998. Re-elected in 2000. Re-elected in 2002. Re-elected in 2004. Re-elected in 2006. Re-elected in 2008. Re-elected in 2010. Redistricted to the 18th district.	1993–2003; San Mateo, northwestern Santa Clara
Anna Eshoo (Atherton)	Democratic	January 3, 1993 – January 3, 2013	103rd 104th 105th 106th 107th 108th 109th 110th 111th 112th	Elected in 1992. Re-elected in 1994. Re-elected in 1996. Re-elected in 1998. Re-elected in 2000. Re-elected in 2002. Re-elected in 2004. Re-elected in 2006. Re-elected in 2008. Re-elected in 2010. Redistricted to the 18th district.	2003–2013 Southern San Mateo, northwestern Santa Clara, Santa Cruz
Jackie Speier (Hillsborough)	Democratic	January 3, 2013 – January 3, 2023	113th 114th 115th 116th 117th	Redistricted from the 12th district and re-elected in 2012. Re-elected in 2014. Re-elected in 2016. Re-elected in 2018. Re-elected in 2020. Redistricted to the 15th district and retired.	2013–2023 San Mateo, southwestern San Francisco
Eric Swalwell (Livermore)	Democratic	January 3, 2023 – April 14, 2026	118th 119th	Redistricted from the 15th district and re-elected in 2022. Re-elected in 2024. Resigned.	2023–2027 Part of Alameda
Vacant		April 14, 2026 – September 2, 2026	119th		2023–2027 Part of Alameda
Aisha Wahab (Hayward)	Democratic	September 2, 2026 – present	119th	Elected in runoff to finish Swalwell's term. Re-elected in 2026.	2023–2027 Part of Alameda
Aisha Wahab (Hayward)	Democratic	September 2, 2026 – present	119th	Elected in runoff to finish Swalwell's term. Re-elected in 2026.	2027–present Part of Alameda

== Election results ==
=== 1932 ===
1932 United States House of Representatives elections in California
Party	Candidate	Votes	%
Democratic	Thomas F. Ford	47,368	57.1
Republican	William D. Campbell	35,598	42.9
Total votes		82,966	100.0
Turnout			
Democratic win (new seat)			

=== 1934 ===
1934 United States House of Representatives elections in California
Party	Candidate	Votes	%
Democratic	Thomas F. Ford (incumbent)	52,761	61.0
Republican	William D. Campbell	33,945	37.1
Progressive Party (US, 1924)	Lyndon R. Foster	2,487	2.7
Socialist	Harry Sherr	1,130	1.2
Communist	Lawrence Ross	1,086	1.2
Total votes		91,409	100.0
Turnout			
Democratic hold			

=== 1936 ===
1936 United States House of Representatives elections in California
Party	Candidate	Votes	%
Democratic	Thomas F. Ford (incumbent)	63,365	61.0
Republican	William D. Campbell	25,497	24.6
Progressive Party (US, 1924)	Albert L. Johnson	12,874	12.4
Communist	Harold J. Ashe	1,329	1.3
Socialist	Glen Trimble	770	0.7
Total votes		103,855	100.0
Turnout			
Democratic hold			

=== 1938 ===
1938 United States House of Representatives elections in California
Party	Candidate	Votes	%
Democratic	Thomas F. Ford (incumbent)	67,588	68.3
Republican	William D. Campbell	31,375	31.7
Total votes		98,963	100.0
Turnout			
Democratic hold			

=== 1940 ===
1940 United States House of Representatives elections in California
Party	Candidate	Votes	%
Democratic	Thomas F. Ford (incumbent)	73,137	64.3
Republican	Herbert L. Herberts	37,939	33.3
Communist	Pettis Perry	2,732	2.4
Total votes		113,808	100.0
Turnout			
Democratic hold			

=== 1942 ===
1942 United States House of Representatives elections in California
Party	Candidate	Votes	%
Democratic	Thomas F. Ford (incumbent)	49,326	67
Republican	Herbert L. Herberts	24,349	33
Total votes		73,675	100
Turnout			
Democratic hold			

=== 1944 ===
1944 United States House of Representatives elections in California
Party	Candidate	Votes	%
Democratic	Helen Gahagan Douglas	65,729	51.6
Republican	William D. Campbell	61,767	48.4
Total votes		127,496	100.0
Turnout			
Democratic hold			

=== 1946 ===
1946 United States House of Representatives elections in California
Party	Candidate	Votes	%
Democratic	Helen Gahagan Douglas (incumbent)	53,536	54.4
Republican	Frederick M. Roberts	44,914	45.6
Total votes		98,450	100.0
Turnout			
Democratic hold			

=== 1948 ===
1948 United States House of Representatives elections in California#District 14
Party	Candidate	Votes	%
Democratic	Helen Gahagan Douglas (incumbent)	89,581	65.3
Republican	W. Wallace Braden	44,611	32.5
Progressive	Sidney Moore	2,904	2.2
Total votes		137,096	100.0
Turnout			
Democratic hold			

=== 1950 ===
1950 United States House of Representatives elections in California
Party	Candidate	Votes	%
Democratic	Sam Yorty	47,653	49.4
Republican	Jack W. Hardy	35,543	36.8
Progressive	Charlotta A. Bass	13,364	13.8
Total votes		96,560	100.0
Turnout			
Democratic hold			

=== 1952 ===
1952 United States House of Representatives elections in California#District 14
Party	Candidate	Votes	%
Democratic	Harlan Hagen	70,809	51
Republican	Thomas H. Werdel (incumbent)	68,011	49
Total votes		138,820	100
Turnout			
Democratic gain from Republican			

=== 1954 ===
1954 United States House of Representatives elections in California
Party	Candidate	Votes	%
Democratic	Harlan Hagen	75,194	65
Republican	Al Blain	40,270	35
Total votes		115,464	100
Turnout			
Democratic hold			

=== 1956 ===
1956 United States House of Representatives elections in California
Party	Candidate	Votes	%
Democratic	Harlan Hagen (incumbent)	94,461	63
Republican	Myron F. Tisdel	55,509	37
Total votes		149,970	100
Turnout			
Democratic hold			

=== 1958 ===
1958 United States House of Representatives elections in California
Party	Candidate	Votes	%
Democratic	Harlan Hagen (incumbent)	120,347	100.0
Turnout			
Democratic hold			

=== 1960 ===
1960 United States House of Representatives elections in California
Party	Candidate	Votes	%
Democratic	Harlan Hagen (incumbent)	97,026	56.5
Republican	G. Ray Arnett	74,800	43.5
Total votes		171,826	100.0
Turnout			
Democratic hold			

=== 1962 ===
1962 United States House of Representatives elections in California
Party	Candidate	Votes	%
Republican	John F. Baldwin Jr. (incumbent)	99,040	62.9
Democratic	Charles R. Weidner	58,469	37.1
Total votes		157,509	100.0
Turnout			
Republican hold			

=== 1964 ===
1964 United States House of Representatives elections in California
Party	Candidate	Votes	%
Republican	John F. Baldwin Jr. (incumbent)	117,272	64.9
Democratic	Russell M. Koch	63,469	35.1
Total votes		180,741	100.0
Turnout			
Republican hold			

=== 1966 (Special) ===
1966 special election
Party	Candidate	Votes	%
Democratic	Jerome R. Waldie		53.7
Republican	Frank J. Newman		31.2
Republican	John A. Richardson		10.5
Democratic	Leo Antonio Costa		4.3
Republican	Dooris G. "Duke" Johnston		1.6
Republican	Tallak B. Wralstad		1.2
Total votes			100.0
Turnout			
Democratic gain from Republican			

=== 1966 ===
1966 United States House of Representatives elections in California
Party	Candidate	Votes	%
Democratic	Jerome R. Waldie (incumbent)	108,668	56.4
Republican	Frank J. Newman	83,878	43.6
Total votes		192,546	100.0
Turnout			
Democratic hold			

=== 1968 ===
1968 United States House of Representatives elections in California
Party	Candidate	Votes	%
Democratic	Jerome R. Waldie (incumbent)	152,500	71.6
Republican	David W. Schuh	56,598	26.6
American Independent	Luis W. Hamilton	3,945	1.9
Total votes		213,043	100.0
Turnout			
Democratic hold			

=== 1970 ===
1970 United States House of Representatives elections in California
Party	Candidate	Votes	%
Democratic	Jerome R. Waldie (incumbent)	148,655	74.5
Republican	Byron D. Athan	50,750	25.5
Total votes		199,405	100.0
Turnout			
Democratic hold			

=== 1972 ===
1972 United States House of Representatives elections in California
Party	Candidate	Votes	%
Democratic	Jerome R. Waldie (incumbent)	158,948	77.6
Republican	Floyd E. Sims	45,985	22.4
Total votes		204,933	100.0
Turnout			
Democratic hold			

=== 1974 ===
1974 United States House of Representatives elections in California
Party	Candidate	Votes	%
Democratic	John J. McFall (incumbent)	101,932	70.9
Republican	Charles M. "Chuck" Gibson	34,679	24.1
American Independent	Roger A. Blaine	7,367	4.9
Total votes		143,978	100.0
Turnout			
Democratic hold			

=== 1976 ===
1976 United States House of Representatives elections in California
Party	Candidate	Votes	%
Democratic	John J. McFall (incumbent)	123,285	72.5
Republican	Roger A. Blaine	46,674	27.5
Total votes		169,959	100.0
Turnout			
Democratic hold			

=== 1978 ===
1978 United States House of Representatives elections in California
Party	Candidate	Votes	%
Republican	Norman D. Shumway (incumbent)	95,962	53.4
Democratic	John J. McFall (incumbent)	76,602	42.6
American Independent	George Darold Waldron	7,163	4.0
Total votes		179,727	100.0
Turnout			
Republican gain from Democratic			

=== 1980 ===
1980 United States House of Representatives elections in California
Party	Candidate	Votes	%
Republican	Norman D. Shumway (incumbent)	133,979	60.7
Democratic	Ann Cerney	79,883	36.2
Libertarian	Douglas G. Housley	6,717	3.0
Total votes		220,579	100.0
Turnout			
Republican hold			

=== 1982 ===
1982 United States House of Representatives elections in California
Party	Candidate	Votes	%
Republican	Norman D. Shumway (incumbent)	134,225	63.4
Democratic	Baron Reed	77,400	36.6
Total votes		211,625	100.0
Turnout			
Republican hold			

=== 1984 ===
1984 United States House of Representatives elections in California
Party	Candidate	Votes	%
Republican	Norman D. Shumway (incumbent)	179,238	73.3
Democratic	Ruth Paula Carlson	58,384	23.9
Libertarian	Fred W. Colburn	6,850	2.8
Total votes		244,472	100.0
Turnout			
Republican hold			

=== 1986 ===
1986 United States House of Representatives elections in California
Party	Candidate	Votes	%
Republican	Norman D. Shumway (incumbent)	146,906	71.6
Democratic	Bill Steele	53,597	26.1
Libertarian	Bruce A. Daniel	4,658	2.3
Total votes		205,161	100.0
Turnout			
Republican hold			

=== 1988 ===
1988 United States House of Representatives elections in California
Party	Candidate	Votes	%
Republican	Norman D. Shumway (incumbent)	173,876	62.6
Democratic	Patricia Malberg	103,899	37.4
Total votes		277,775	100.0
Turnout			
Republican hold			

=== 1990 ===
1990 United States House of Representatives elections in California
Party	Candidate	Votes	%
Republican	John Doolittle	128,309	51.5
Democratic	Patricia Malberg	120,742	48.5
Total votes		249,051	100.0
Turnout			
Republican hold			

=== 1992 ===
1992 United States House of Representatives elections in California
Party	Candidate	Votes	%
Democratic	Anna Eshoo	146,873	56.7
Republican	Tom Huening	101,202	39.0
Libertarian	Chuck Olson	7,220	2.8
Peace and Freedom	David Wald	3,912	1.5
No party	Sims (write-in)	12	0.0
No party	Maginnis (write-in)	3	0.0
Total votes		259,232	100.0
Turnout			
Democratic gain from Republican			

=== 1994 ===
1994 United States House of Representatives elections in California
Party	Candidate	Votes	%
Democratic	Anna Eshoo (incumbent)	130,713	60.60
Republican	Ben Brink	78,475	39.40
Total votes		199,188	100.0
Turnout			
Democratic hold			

=== 1996 ===
1996 United States House of Representatives elections in California
Party	Candidate	Votes	%
Democratic	Anna Eshoo (incumbent)	149,313	64.9
Republican	Ben Brink	71,573	31.1
Peace and Freedom	Timothy Thompson	3,653	1.6
Libertarian	Joseph Dehn	3,492	1.5
Natural Law	Robert Wells	2,144	0.9
Total votes		230,175	100.0
Turnout			
Democratic hold			

=== 1998 ===
1998 United States House of Representatives elections in California
Party	Candidate	Votes	%
Democratic	Anna Eshoo (incumbent)	129,663	68.64
Republican	Chris Haugen	53,719	28.44
Libertarian	Joseph W. Dehn III	3,166	1.68
Natural Law	Anna Currivan	2,362	1.25
Total votes		188,910	100.0
Turnout			
Democratic hold			

=== 2000 ===
2000 United States House of Representatives elections in California
Party	Candidate	Votes	%
Democratic	Anna Eshoo (incumbent)	161,720	70.3
Republican	Bill Quraishi	59,338	25.8
Libertarian	Joseph W. Dehn III	4,715	2.0
Natural Law	John Black	4,489	1.9
Total votes		230,262	100.0
Turnout			
Democratic hold			

=== 2002 ===
2002 United States House of Representatives elections in California
Party	Candidate	Votes	%
Democratic	Anna Eshoo (incumbent)	117,055	68.2
Republican	Joe Nixon	48,346	28.2
Libertarian	Andrew B. Carver	6,277	3.6
Total votes		171,678	100.0
Turnout			
Democratic hold			

=== 2004 ===
2004 United States House of Representatives elections in California
Party	Candidate	Votes	%
Democratic	Anna Eshoo (incumbent)	182,712	69.8
Republican	Chris Haugen	69,564	26.6
Libertarian	Brian Holtz	9,588	3.6
No party	Dennis Mitrzyk (write-in)	24	0.0
Total votes		262,088	100.0
Turnout			
Democratic hold			

=== 2006 ===
2006 United States House of Representatives elections in California
Party	Candidate	Votes	%
Democratic	Anna Eshoo (incumbent)	141,153	71.1
Republican	Rob Smith	48,097	24.3
Libertarian	Brian Holtz	4,692	2.3
Green	Carol Brouillet	4,633	2.3
Total votes		198,575	100.0
Turnout			
Democratic hold			

=== 2008 ===
2008 United States House of Representatives elections in California
Party	Candidate	Votes	%
Democratic	Anna Eshoo (incumbent)	141,623	70.1
Republican	Ronny Santana	44,902	22.2
Libertarian	Brian Holtz	8,670	4.2
Green	Carol Brouillet	7,090	3.5
Total votes		202,285	100.0
Turnout			
Democratic hold			

=== 2010 ===
2010 United States House of Representatives elections in California
Party	Candidate	Votes	%
Democratic	Anna Eshoo (incumbent)	151,217	69.1
Republican	Dave Chapman	60,917	27.8
Libertarian	Paul Lazaga	6,735	3.1
Total votes		218,869	100.00
Turnout			
Democratic hold			

=== 2012 ===
2012 United States House of Representatives elections in California
Party	Candidate	Votes	%
Democratic	Jackie Speier	203,828	79%
Republican	Deborah (Debbie) Bacigalupi	54,455	21%
Total votes		258,283	100.00%
Democratic hold			

=== 2014 ===
2014 United States House of Representatives elections in California
Party	Candidate	Votes	%
Democratic	Jackie Speier	114,389	77%
Republican	Robin Chew	34,757	23%
Total votes		149,146	100.00%
Democratic hold			

=== 2016 ===
2016 United States House of Representatives elections in California
Party	Candidate	Votes	%
Democratic	Jackie Speier	231,630	81%
Republican	Angel Cardenas	54,817	19%
Total votes		286,447	100%
Democratic hold			

=== 2018 ===
2018 United States House of Representatives elections in California
Party	Candidate	Votes	%
Democratic	Jackie Speier	211,384	79%
Republican	Cristina Osmeña	55,439	20%
Total votes		266,823	100%
Democratic hold			

=== 2020 ===
2020 United States House of Representatives elections in California
Party	Candidate	Votes	%
Democratic	Jackie Speier (incumbent)	278,227	79.3
Republican	Ran Petel	72,684	20.7
Total votes		350,911	100.0
Democratic hold			

=== 2022 ===
2022 United States House of Representatives elections in California
Party	Candidate	Votes	%
Democratic	Eric Swalwell (incumbent)	137,612	69.3
Republican	Alison Hayden	60,852	30.7
Total votes		198,464	100.0
Democratic hold			

=== 2024 ===
2024 United States House of Representatives elections in California
Party	Candidate	Votes	%
Democratic	Eric Swalwell (incumbent)	187,263	67.8
Republican	Vin Kruttiventi	89,125	32.2
Total votes		276,388	100.0
Democratic hold			

=== 2026 (special) ===
2026 California's 14th congressional district special election
Primary election
Party	Candidate	Votes	%
Democratic	Aisha Wahab	52,961	42.8
Democratic	Melissa Hernandez	20,731	16.8
Democratic	Rakhi Israni Singh	15,910	12.9
Republican	Wendy Huang	11,407	9.2
Republican	Dena Maldonado	11,188	9.0
Republican	Tom Wong	5,075	4.1
Democratic	Sheriene Ridenour	2,489	2.0
Republican	Jack Wu	2,101	1.7
No party preference	Victor Zevallos	831	0.7
Democratic	Alisha Cordes	713	0.6
Democratic	Jot Thiara	271	0.2
Total votes		123,677	100.0
Runoff election
Democratic	Aisha Wahab	51,692	53.1
Democratic	Melissa Hernandez	45,670	46.9
Total votes		97,362	100.0
Democratic hold			

== Historical district boundaries ==
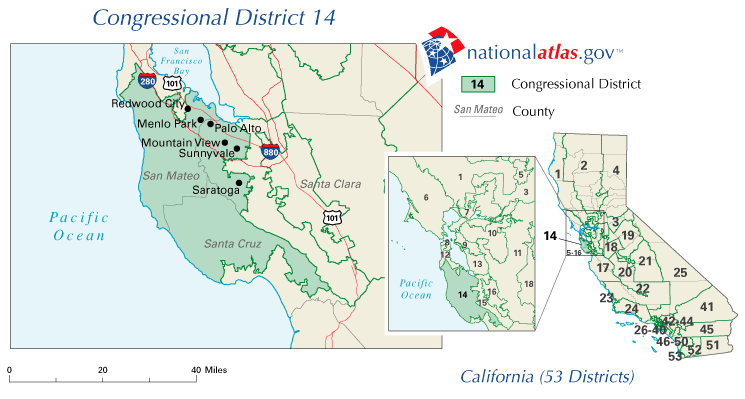
2003 - 2013

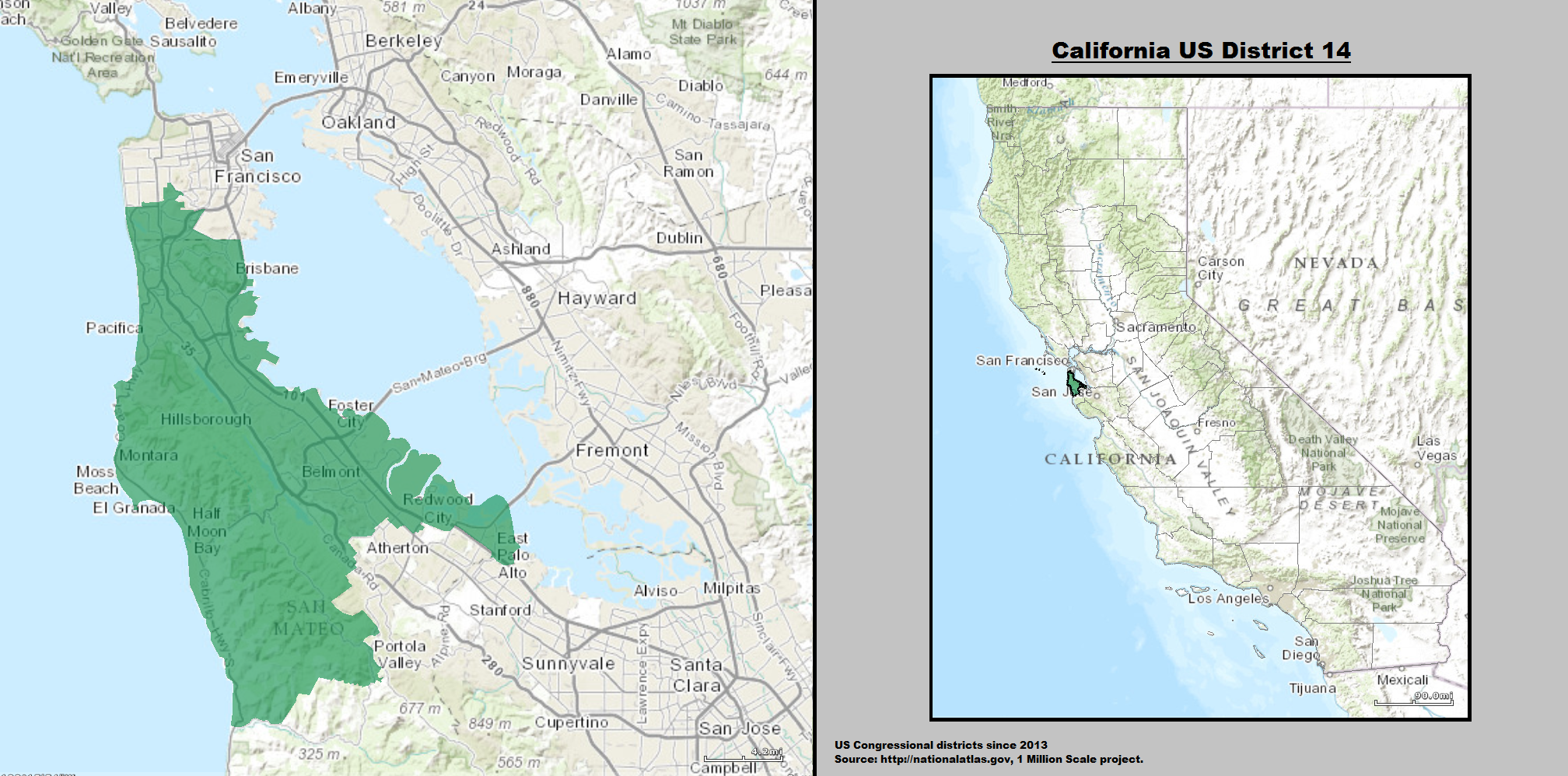
2013 - 2023

== See also ==
- List of United States congressional districts
- California's congressional districts
