= Eric Swalwell =

American politician (born 1980)

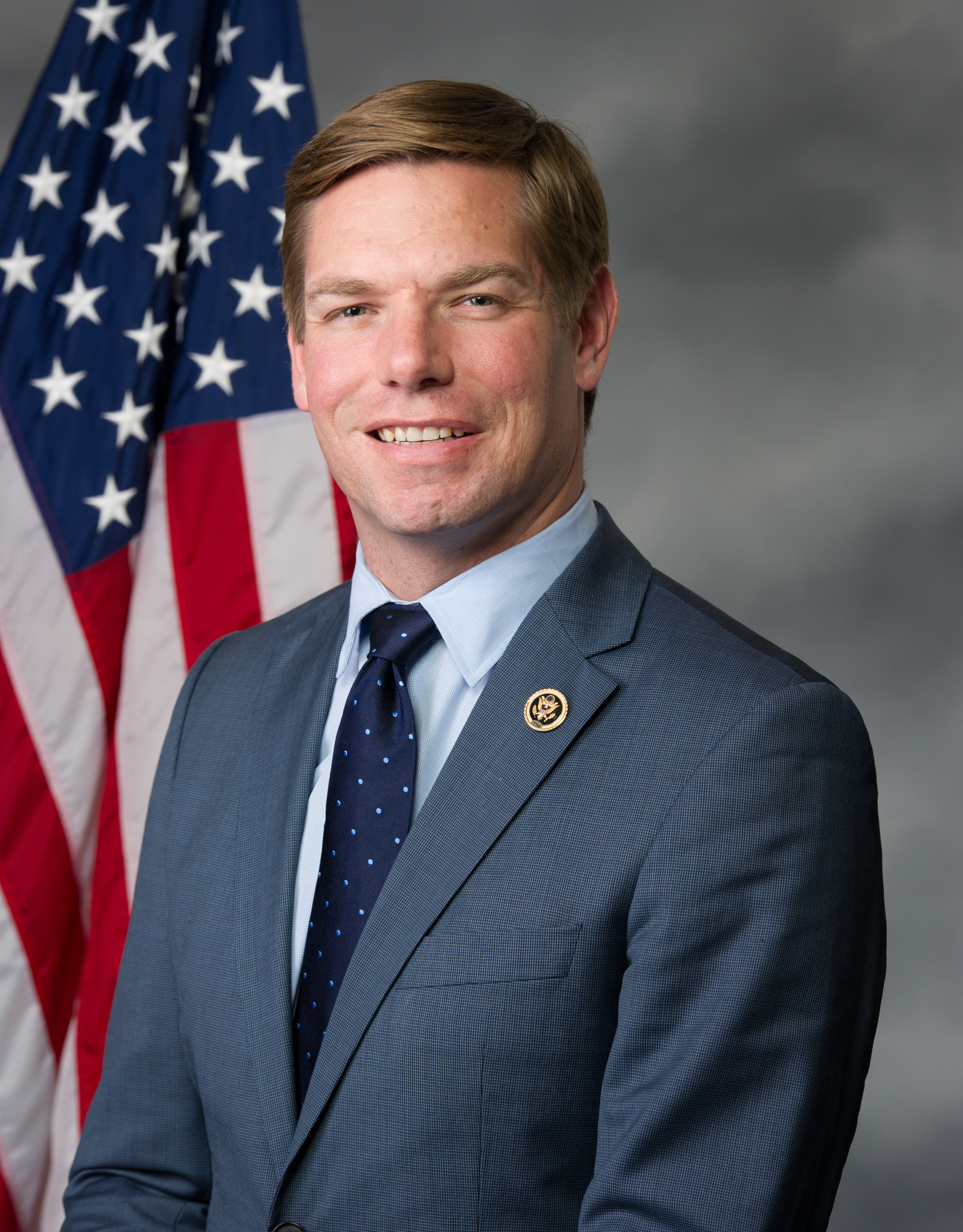
- Official portrait, 2016

Member of the U.S. House of Representatives from California
- In office January 3, 2013 – April 14, 2026
- Preceded by: Pete Stark (redistricted)
- Succeeded by: Aisha Wahab
- Constituency: 15th district (2013–2023); 14th district (2023–2026)

Member of the Dublin City Council
- In office December 7, 2010 – January 3, 2013
- Preceded by: Kate Ann Scholz
- Succeeded by: Abe Gupta

Personal details
- Born: Eric Michael Swalwell; November 16, 1980 (age 46) Sac City, Iowa, U.S.
- Party: Democratic
- Spouses: Melissa Maranda (m. 2007; div. 2010); Brittany Watts (m. 2016)
- Children: 3
- Education: Campbell University (attended); University of Maryland, College Park (BA); University of Maryland, Baltimore (JD)
- Swalwell's voice Swalwell on fallen police officers Recorded May 12, 2021

Eric Michael Swalwell (/ˈswɑːlwɛl/; born November 16, 1980) is an American former politician who served as a U.S. representative from California from 2013 to 2026. A member of the Democratic Party, Swalwell previously served on the city council for Dublin, California from 2010 to 2013.

A graduate of the University of Maryland, Swalwell worked as a deputy district attorney in Alameda County from 2006 to 2012. He was elected to Congress after defeating Democratic incumbent Pete Stark in 2012. He unsuccessfully ran for his party's nomination in the 2020 United States presidential election and the 2026 California gubernatorial election.

In April 2026, allegations of rape and other sexual misconduct led him to suspend his gubernatorial campaign and resign from Congress. He continues to deny any wrongdoing amid criminal investigations into the allegations.

== Early life and education ==
Swalwell was born on November 16, 1980, in Sac City, Iowa. He is the oldest of four sons of Eric Nelson Swalwell and Vicky Joe Swalwell, both of whom are Republicans. During his early childhood, his father served as police chief in Algona, Iowa. After leaving Iowa, the family eventually settled in Dublin, California. He graduated from Dublin High School in 1999.

Swalwell attended Campbell University and played soccer on a scholarship for the Campbell Fighting Camels from 1999 to 2001. He lost his scholarship in 2001 after breaking both his thumbs. He transferred to the University of Maryland, College Park and interned for U.S. Representative Ellen Tauscher between 2001 and 2002. After his internship, he used his role in the Student Government Association to create a program for children who lost parents in the September 11 attacks. He graduated with a Bachelor of Arts in government and politics in 2003. In 2006, he received a Juris Doctor from the University of Maryland School of Law.

== Early political career ==
From 2006 to 2012, Swalwell worked as a deputy district attorney in Alameda County. He served on the Dublin Heritage & Cultural Arts Commission from 2006 to 2008 and on the Dublin Planning Commission from 2008 to 2010 before winning election to the Dublin City Council in 2010. While he was running for the U.S. Congress, an anonymous group attempted to recall Swalwell from the city council, but the effort was later abandoned.

== U.S. House of Representatives ==
=== Elections ===
==== 2012 ====
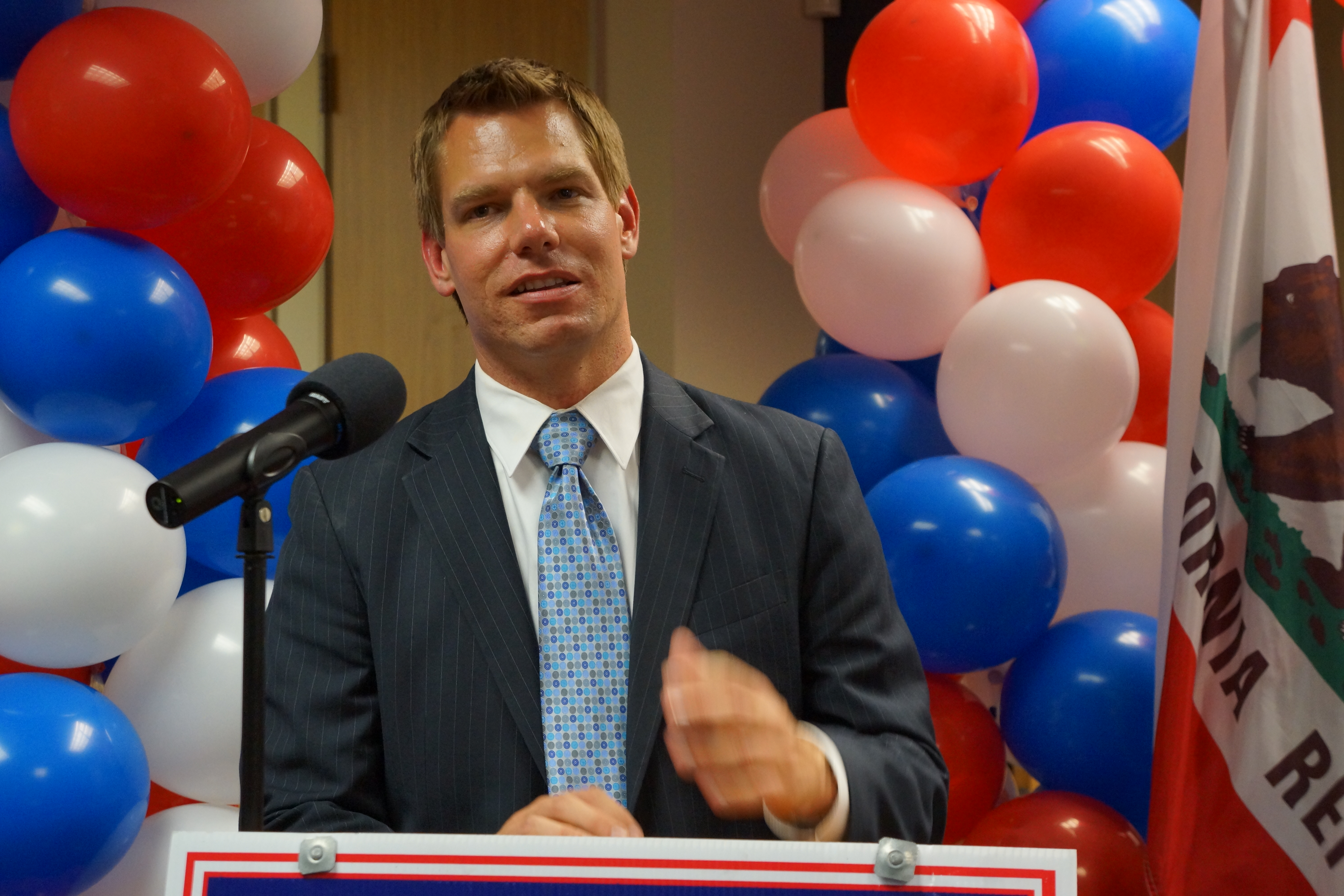
Swalwell gives a speech after being elected to the 15th Congressional District.

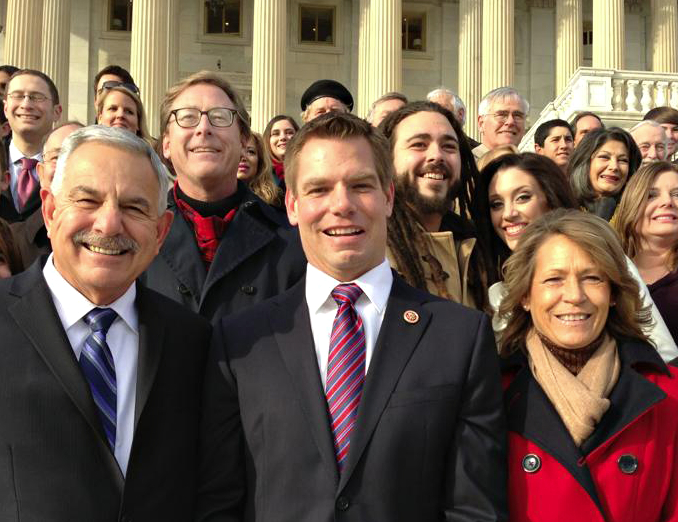
Swalwell with his staff and family in Capitol Hill, 2013

In September 2011, Swalwell filed to run for Congress in California's 15th congressional district. The district had previously been the 13th, represented by 20-term incumbent Democrat Pete Stark. Swalwell took a leave of absence from the Dublin City Council to run for the seat.

Even though he was a Democrat, Swalwell was able to contest Stark in the general election because of California's "top two" primary system put in place by Proposition 14. Under that system, the top two primary vote-getters advance to the general election, regardless of party affiliation. In the June primary, Stark finished first with 41.8% of the vote, Swalwell placed second with 36%, and independent candidate Chris Pareja third with 22.2%.

In the November general election, the San Francisco Chronicle and the San Jose Mercury News both endorsed Swalwell. The Stark campaign accused Swalwell of being a Tea Party candidate and refused to debate Swalwell during the campaign. In response, Swalwell organized a mock debate with an actor playing Stark, quoting him verbatim when answering the moderator. Other campaign gimmicks included rubber ducks that stood in for rubber chickens and suggested that Stark was too "chicken" to debate. Stark pointed out that the ducks were made in China and criticized Swalwell for not "buying American".

Swalwell defeated Stark, 52.1% to 47.9%.

==== 2014 ====
Swalwell was challenged by Republican Hugh Bussell, a senior manager at Workday, Inc., and by Democratic State Senate Majority Leader Ellen Corbett of Hayward. Corbett, placed third in June's primary, not earning enough votes to make the general election. Swalwell defeated Bussell in the November general election, 69.8% to 30.2%. He was sworn into his second term on January 3, 2015.

==== 2016 ====
Swalwell was challenged by Republican Danny Reid Turner of Livermore. He defeated Turner in the November general election, 73.8% to 26.2%. He was sworn into his third term on January 3, 2017.

==== 2018 ====
Swalwell was challenged by Republican Rudy Peters of Livermore. He defeated Peters in the November general election, 73.0% to 27.0%. He was sworn into his fourth term on January 3, 2019.

==== 2020 ====
Swalwell won the 2020 election against Republican challenger Alison Hayden, 70.9% to 29.1%.

==== 2022 ====
In early 2022, Swalwell was redistricted to California's 14th congressional district. He went up against and defeated Republican Alison Hayden, 69.3% to 30.7%. He was sworn into his sixth term on January 3, 2023.

==== 2024 ====
Swalwell was challenged by Republican Vin Kruttiventi. He defeated Kruttiventi in the November general election, 67.8% to 32.2%. He was sworn into his seventh and final term on January 3, 2025.

=== Tenure ===
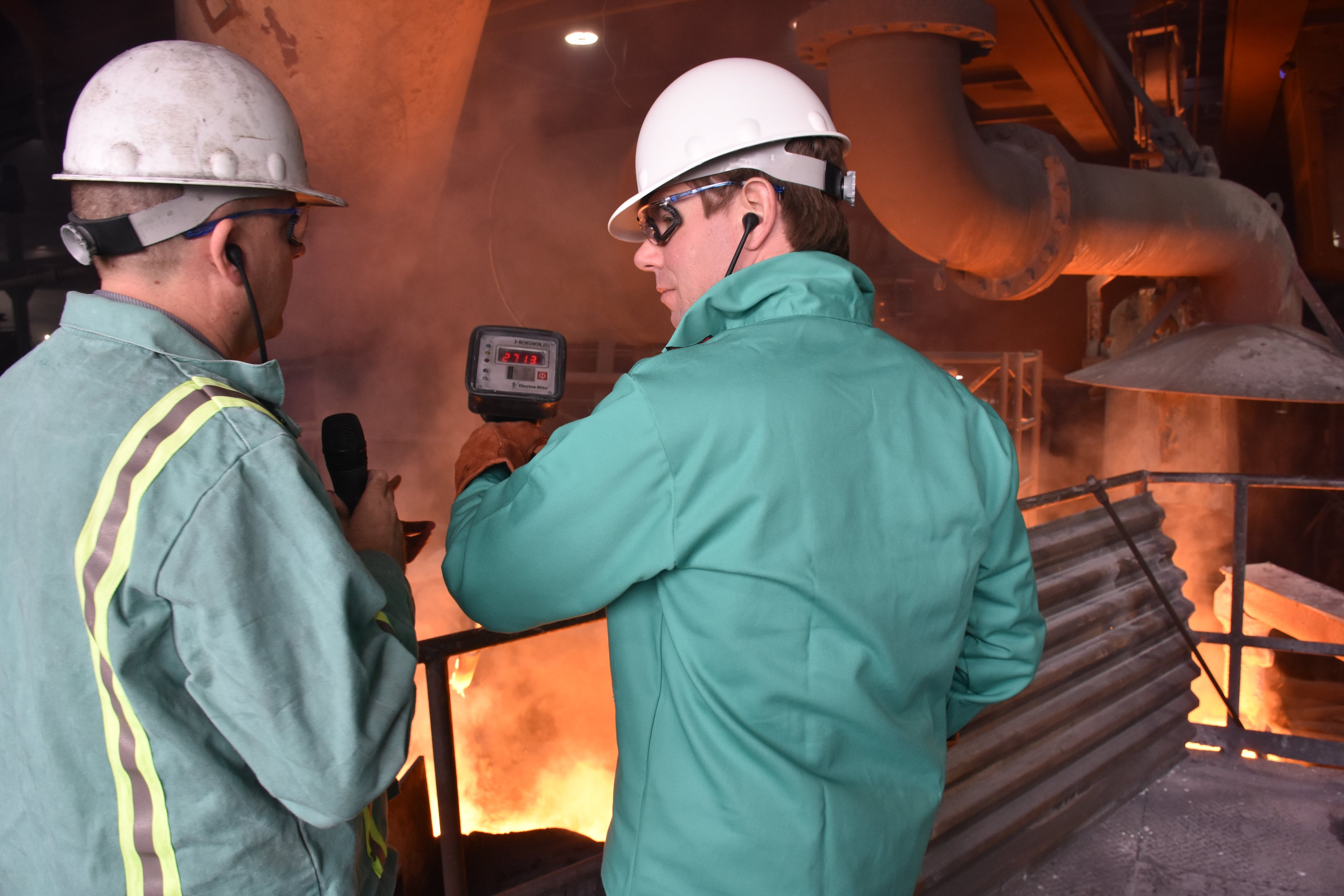
Swalwell visits US Pipe in Union City, California, 2020

In his first term, Swalwell served on the House Committee on Homeland Security and the House Committee on Science, Space and Technology. He helped lead the fight against Transportation Security Administration administrator John S. Pistole's decision to lift the ban on pocketknives at airport security; the decision eventually was reversed.

During a House vote on June 18, 2013, Swalwell used his mobile phone to record a video of his vote against a bill that would ban abortions after 20 weeks (the video was a six-second clip of him pressing the "nay" button on the electronic voting machine) and uploaded it to Vine, an internet video service. House rules bar "the use of mobile electronic devices that impair decorum" and provide that "No device may be used for still photography or for audio or video recording." Swalwell defended the action, saying, "We operate under rules that were created in the 18th century, and I think it's time that the Congress start to act more like regular Americans do. I did not see this as impairing the decorum. I think what this did was highlight, for all to see, the democratic process."

On December 12, 2013, Swalwell introduced the Philippines Charitable Giving Assistance Act into the House. The bill allowed Americans to deduct from their 2013 taxes any charitable donations made between January 1 and April 15, 2014, for the relief of victims in the Republic of the Philippines of Typhoon Haiyan. On March 25, 2014, President Barack Obama signed this legislation into law.

By the conclusion of his first term, Swalwell had successfully passed three bills through the House, with two becoming law—more than any other first-term member.

In 2014, Swalwell served as chairman of Maryland Governor Martin O'Malley's PAC's Young Professionals Leadership Circle due to his friendship with O'Malley. Although he made clear that his support was about the 2014 midterm elections and not an endorsement of a potential presidential bid by O'Malley in 2016, Swalwell endorsed O'Malley for president in July 2015.

Swalwell questions FBI director Kash Patel on the Epstein files on September 17, 2025.

As a member of the House Intelligence Committee, Swalwell investigated the links between Trump associates and Russian officials during his third term. In 2018, the U.S. Department of Justice under the Trump administration seized Swalwell's personal data. The record seizure also targeted Adam Schiff, who chaired the House Intelligence Committee.

Swalwell served as an impeachment manager during President Donald Trump's second impeachment trial.

On March 5, 2021, Swalwell filed a civil lawsuit against Trump, Trump's son Donald Jr., Representative Mo Brooks, and Rudy Giuliani, seeking damages for their alleged role in inciting the January 6 attack on the Capitol.

In January 2023, Speaker Kevin McCarthy expelled Swalwell and Adam Schiff from the House Intelligence Committee.

==== Contact with suspected Chinese spy ====
In December 2020, Swalwell was named in an Axios story about suspected Chinese spy Fang Fang (方芳; Fāng Fāng), known as Christine Fang, who, since at least 2012, had been cultivating contacts with California politicians who the Chinese government believed had promising futures in politics. Axios reported that Fang participated in fundraising for Swalwell's 2014 congressional election bid, met Swalwell at events, and helped place an intern inside his congressional office.

Swalwell ended ties with Fang in 2015 after U.S. intelligence briefed him and top members of Congress on concerns that Chinese agents were attempting to infiltrate Congress. Axios reported that Swalwell was not accused of any impropriety, and that officials did not believe that Fang had obtained classified information from her contacts. The San Francisco Chronicle quoted an unnamed FBI official familiar with the investigation as saying that "Swalwell was completely cooperative and under no suspicion of wrongdoing".

Swalwell suggested that someone in the Trump administration may have leaked the information to the press, as he had been a vocal critic of Trump, and had served on committees involved in both of Trump's impeachments. Following the Axios report, Swalwell received death and rape threats against himself and his family.

In March 2021, House Minority Leader Kevin McCarthy moved to remove Swalwell from his seat on the House Intelligence Committee; his motion was rejected on a party-line vote. After McCarthy became Speaker in January 2023, resumed removing Swalwell from the committee, saying, "If you got the briefing I got from the FBI, you wouldn't have Swalwell on any committee." Swalwell characterized McCarthy's action as "purely vengeance". Intelligence Committee members are term-limited and Swalwell's membership expired in January 2023.

The House Ethics Committee opened an investigation into Swalwell in April 2021. The committee wrote him in May 2023 that the investigation had been closed with no further action while also cautioning members to "be conscious of the possibility that foreign governments may attempt to secure improper influence through gifts and interactions".

In August 2026, according to newly declassified documents released by the White House Government Transparency Task Force, Swalwell told FBI investigators he had physical relations with Fang.

==== Resignation ====
On April 11, 2026, in the wake of sexual misconduct allegations which caused Swalwell to drop out of the 2026 California gubernatorial election, Axios reported that Congresswoman Anna Paulina Luna intended to file a bill forcing the expulsion of Swalwell and representative Tony Gonzales, another member of the House of Representatives accused of sexual misconduct. On April 13, both Swalwell and Gonzales resigned from Congress.

On August 15, 2026, FBI agents served a search warrant on Swalwell at San Francisco International Airport and seized an Apple iPhone, charging cable and adapter, and an Apple MacBook Pro, according to court records. Newly released surveillance footage showed agents approaching Swalwell near his gate after he exited a plane and escorting him into a restricted area. The search was part of a federal investigation related to allegations of sexual misconduct against him. He was not charged with a crime.

=== Committee assignments ===
For the 119th Congress:

- Committee on Homeland Security
  - Subcommittee on Cybersecurity and Infrastructure Protection (Ranking Member)
- Committee on the Judiciary
  - Subcommittee on Courts, Intellectual Property, Artificial Intelligence, and the Internet
  - Crime and Federal Government Surveillance

=== Caucus memberships ===
- House Democratic Steering Committee (co-chair)
- American Sikh Congressional Caucus
- Black Maternal Health Caucus
- Congressional Asian Pacific American Caucus
- Congressional LGBT Equality Caucus
- Blue Collar Caucus
- Congressional Blockchain Caucus
- Congressional Ukraine Caucus
- Rare Disease Caucus

== 2020 presidential campaign ==
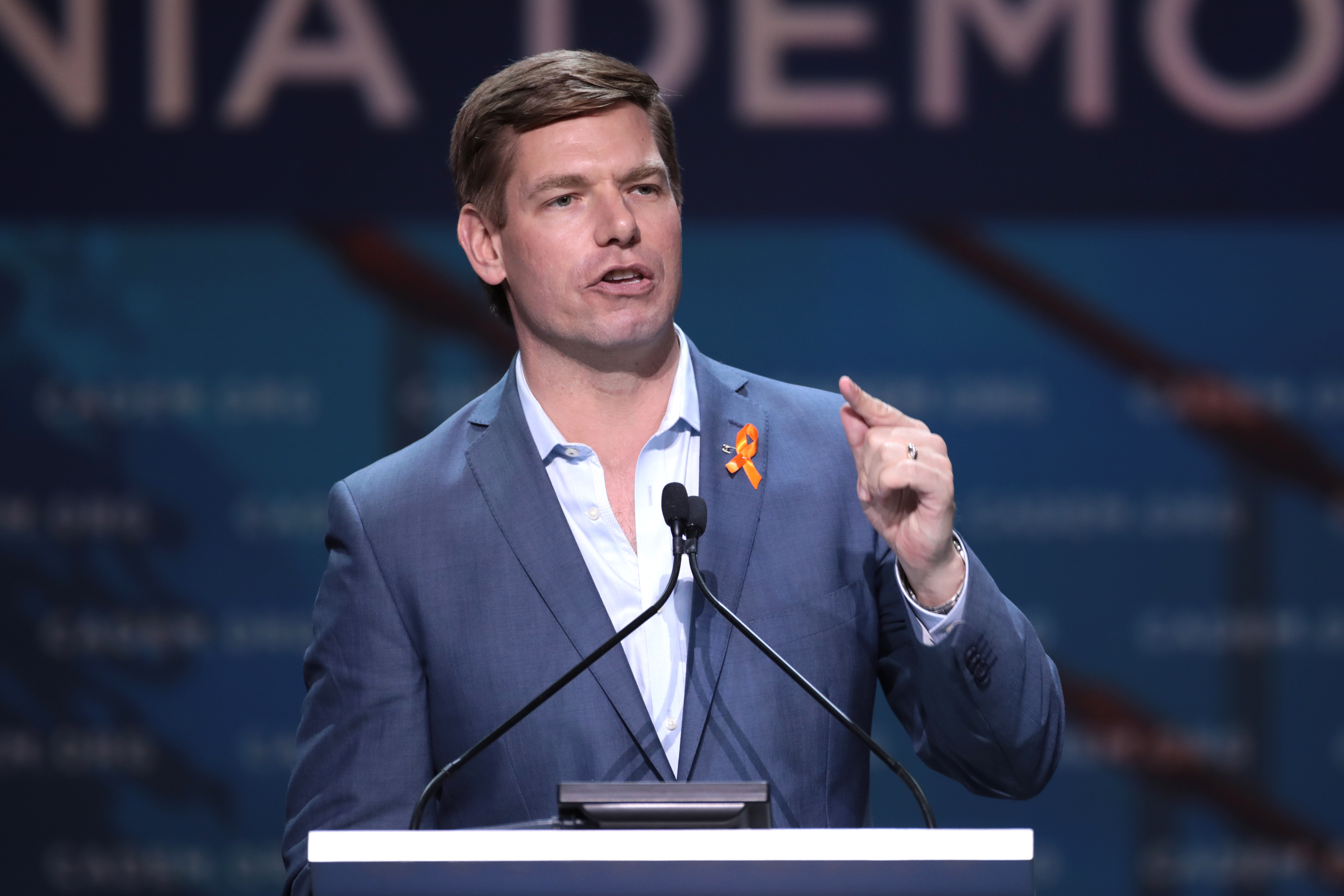
Eric Swalwell speaking to the California Democratic Party State Convention in June 2019

Swalwell for America
- Campaign: 2020 United States presidential election (Democratic Party primaries)
- Candidate: Eric Swalwell; U.S. Representative from California's 15th district (2013–2023)
- Affiliation: Democratic Party
- Announced: April 8, 2019
- Suspended: July 8, 2019
- Headquarters: Dublin, California
- Key people: Ruben Gallego (campaign chair); Lisa Tucker (chief strategist, campaign manager); Garrick Delzell (chief operating officer); Alex Evans (senior strategist); Tim Sbranti (senior strategist)
- Receipts: US$2,602,439.44 (September 30, 2019)

On April 8, 2019, Swalwell launched his candidacy for president on The Late Show with Stephen Colbert, followed by a formal declaration at Dublin High School on April 14, 2019.

Swalwell participated in one presidential debate. During the debate, he commented that he was six years old when Joe Biden spoke of passing the torch to a younger generation. Swalwell's polling average never rose above 1%. On July 8, 2019, he withdrew from the race. At the time, he was at risk of not qualifying for the second set of debates.

== 2026 gubernatorial campaign ==
Swalwell launched his gubernatorial campaign on November 20, 2025, to succeed term-limited Democratic governor Gavin Newsom, during an appearance on Jimmy Kimmel Live!. For the majority of his campaign, Swalwell was the top-polling Democrat in the jungle primary, usually performing better than his Democratic opponents which included former congresswoman Katie Porter, former presidential candidate Tom Steyer, and former HHS Secretary Xavier Becerra.

== Allegations of rape and other sexual misconduct ==
On April 10, 2026, the San Francisco Chronicle and CNN reported that more than four women had accused Swalwell of sexual misconduct including rape. One former Swalwell staffer claimed Swalwell had raped her, recalling one incident in which Swalwell had sex with her while she was blacked out and another in which he continued grabbing her as she told him to stop and tried to push him off. Two other women claimed Swalwell sent them unsolicited images of his penis and had requested nude images of them. Politico reported that a former Swalwell employee signed a non-disclosure agreement (NDA) pertaining to employment discrimination when they left his office. Although the agreement was not related to sexual harassment, it directly contradicted Swalwell's previous claims that no one on his staff signed an NDA. Swalwell described the allegations as "lies" and claimed that they were intended to damage his campaign for governor. The Los Angeles Times reported that Swalwell's attorney had sent a cease and desist letter to the staffer and threatened to sue her for defamation. Cheyenne Hunt and Arielle Fodor also heavily emphasized this on social media.

On April 11, Alvin Bragg, the Manhattan District Attorney, said his office was investigating Swalwell for alleged sexual assault. Multiple high-level staffers resigned from Swalwell's gubernatorial campaign in advance of the report, including U.S. Representative and campaign chair Jimmy Gomez. Endorsers, including the California Teachers Association and U.S. Senator Ruben Gallego, rescinded their endorsements of Swalwell. Some issued statements calling for Swalwell to drop out of the gubernatorial election, as did two of his gubernatorial opponents Tony Thurmond and Matt Mahan. Senior staff members from his gubernatorial campaign and from California's 14th Congressional District office issued a joint statement in which they distanced themselves from Swalwell and expressed support for the women who had come forward.

Senator Adam Schiff and former speaker of the House Nancy Pelosi, both also from California, advised Swalwell to drop out of the race, and he did so on April 12. Schiff had previously endorsed Swalwell. Swalwell faced calls from both sides to be expelled from Congress; representative Anna Paulina Luna intended to file a motion to expel Swalwell. On April 13, he resigned from his seat in the U.S. House of Representatives, effective the following day. The following day, a fifth woman came forward, accusing Swalwell of rape, drugging her, and choking her unconscious, saying she thought she had died.

On August 15, 2026, federal agents seized Swalwell's electronic devices at San Francisco International Airport, and the next day raided his home in Washington, DC, as part of an ongoing probe connected to sexual assault allegations.

== Political positions ==
Swalwell has called for greater authenticity from politicians, saying that they should not insult each other publicly and then expect to have friendly relationships "backstage", and comparing some politicians' behavior to a fake, entertainment-focused professional wrestling show. He has proposed the idea of a "mobile Congress", with members casting votes remotely while spending more time in their districts.

=== Domestic policy ===
In 2019, Swalwell made gun control a signature issue of his presidential campaign, including a ban with a mandatory buyback of all firearms deemed assault weapons, and universal background checks.

In 2022, Swalwell was one of 16 Democrats to vote against the Merger Filing Fee Modernization Act of 2022, an antitrust package that would crack down on corporations for anti-competitive behavior.

In 2025, in response to masked ICE agents conducting increasingly violent and high-profile enforcement actions against both immigrants and citizens on behalf of the Trump administration, Swalwell said that ICE would be more credible if they did not wear masks, and advocated for legislation that would tie ICE's funding to a ban on agents wearing masks in the course of their duties.

=== Foreign policy ===
In 2017, Swalwell co-sponsored the Israel Anti-Boycott Act, a House bill designed to allow U.S. states to enact laws requiring contractors to sign pledges promising not to boycott any goods from Israel and Israeli-occupied territories or their contracts would be terminated.

In 2019, Swalwell criticized Trump's trade war against China. He condemned the 2019 Turkish offensive into northeastern Syria and called for possibly suspending Turkey's membership in NATO.

In 2022, Swalwell proposed measures such as closing the Russian embassy in the United States and expelling Russian students as part of a broader response to the Russian invasion of Ukraine. His remarks drew criticism in some media and political commentary, while he defended his position on social media.

== Personal life ==
Swalwell married Melissa Maranda in 2007. After a divorce, Swalwell married his second wife, Brittany Ann Watts, a sales director at the Ritz-Carlton in Half Moon Bay, in October 2016. They have three children. Swalwell identifies as Protestant.

In 2020, Swalwell purchased a home for $1.2 million in Eckington, Washington, D.C.

In April 2026, Citizenship and Immigration Services said it referred allegations of Swalwell illegally employing a Brazilian nanny several years ago to law enforcement officials at the Department of Homeland Security for investigation.

== Electoral history ==
Electoral history of Eric Swalwell
Year	Office		Party	Primary			General			Result	Swing	Ref.
Year	Office		Party	Total	%	P.	Total	%	P.	Result	Swing	Ref.
2010	City Council		Nonpartisan				6,468	36.81	1st	Won		
2012	U.S. House	15th	Democratic	34,347	36.19	2nd	120,388	52.11	1st	Won	Hold	
2014	U.S. House	15th	Democratic	42,419	49.07	1st	99,756	69.81	1st	Won	Hold	
2016	U.S. House	15th	Democratic	110,803	76.50	1st	198,578	73.77	1st	Won	Hold	
2018	U.S. House	15th	Democratic	90,971	70.49	1st	177,989	72.97	1st	Won	Hold	
2020	U.S. House	15th	Democratic	103,826	59.04	1st	242,991	70.90	1st	Won	Hold	
2022	U.S. House	14th	Democratic	77,120	63.62	1st	137,612	69.34	1st	Won	Hold	
2024	U.S. House	14th	Democratic	84,075	66.74	1st	187,263	67.75	1st	Won	Hold	
2026	Governor		Democratic	Withdrew								
Source: Secretary of State of California | Statewide Election Results

U.S. House of Representatives
Preceded by Mike Honda	Member of the U.S. House of Representatives from California's 15th congressional district 2013–2023	Succeeded by Kevin Mullin
Preceded by Jackie Speier	Member of the U.S. House of Representatives from California's 14th congressional district 2023–2026	Succeeded by Aisha Wahab
U.S. order of precedence (ceremonial)
Preceded by Tony Cárdenas as Former U.S. Representative	Order of precedence of the United States as Former U.S. Representative	Succeeded by Vin Weber as Former U.S. Representative
