= List of Fremont Unified School District schools =

Fremont Unified School District (FUSD) is a primary and secondary education school district located in Fremont, California, United States.

The district has 39 school campuses.

== School campuses and attendance areas ==
The district determines attendance at schools based on where an individual lives as its priority. There are five main attendance areas: American Attendance Area, Irvington Attendance Area, Kennedy Attendance Area, Mission Attendance Area and Washington Attendance Area. All include one high school and one middle, in addition to either four or six elementary schools. The attendance areas are further split up into smaller zones for the elementary schools. Often, overcrowding in primary schools is addressed by moving students to another elementary school in the same attendance area.

== List ==
Here is the list of schools in Alphabetical order:

| School | Mascot | Level | Address | Attendance Area | Zipcode |
|---|---|---|---|---|---|
| ABC Magic Moments | N/A | Preschool | 4600 Carol Ave | Kennedy | 94538 |
| Adult School (F.A.C.E.) | N/A | Adult | 4700 Calaveras Avenue | Kennedy | 94538 |
| American | Eagles | High | 36300 Fremont Boulevard | American | 94536 |
| Ardenwood | Dragons | Elementary | 33955 Emilia Lane | American | 94555 |
| Azevada | All-Stars | Elementary | 39450 Royal Palm Drive | Kennedy | 94538 |
| Blacow | Bobcats | Elementary | 40404 Sundale Drive | Kennedy | 94538 |
| Brier | Broncos | Elementary | 39201 Sundale Drive | Kennedy | 94538 |
| Bringhurst | Blazers | Elementary | 45051 Wisdom Road | Kennedy | 94539 |
| Brookvale | Broncos | Elementary | 3400 Nicolet Avenue | American | 94536 |
| Cabrillo | Wildcats | Elementary | 36700 San Pedro Drive | Washington | 94536 |
| Centerville | Mustangs | Middle | 37720 Fremont Boulevard | Washington | 94536 |
| Chadbourne | Pioneers | Elementary | 801 Plymouth Avenue | Mission San Jose | 94539 |
| Durham | Eagles | Elementary | 40292 Leslie Street | Kennedy | 94538 |
| Forest Park | Wolverines | Elementary | 34400 Maybird Circle | American | 94555 |
| Glankler and Rix Glankler | Guppies | Preschool | 39207 Sundale Drive (Glankler); 43100 Isle Royal Street (Rix Glankler) | Kennedy | 94538 |
| Glenmoor | Wildcats | Elementary | 4620 Mattos Drive | Washington | 94536 |
| Gomes | Gophers | Elementary | 555 Lemos Lane | Mission San Jose | 94539 |
| Green | Hornets | Elementary | 42875 Gatewood Street | Irvington | 94538 |
| Grimmer | Bears | Elementary | 43030 Newport Drive | Irvington | 94538 |
| Hirsch | Bulldogs | Elementary | 41399 Chapel Way | Irvington | 94538 |
| Hopkins | Hawks | Middle | 600 Driscoll Road | Mission San Jose | 94539 |
| Horner | Hornets | Middle | 41365 Chapel Way | Irvington | 94538 |
| Irvington | Vikings | High | 41800 Blacow Road | Irvington | 94538 |
| Kennedy | Titans | High | 39999 Blacow Road | Kennedy | 94538 |
| Leitch | Dragons | Elementary | 47100 Fernald Street | Irvington | 94539 |
| Maloney | Bulldogs | Elementary | 38700 Logan Drive | Washington | 94536 |
| Mattos | Eagles | Elementary | 37944 Farwell Drive | Kennedy | 94536 |
| Millard | Mustangs | Elementary | 5200 Valpey Park Drive | Kennedy | 94538 |
| Mission San Jose (K–5) | Mustangs | Elementary | 43545 Bryant Street | Mission San Jose | 94539 |
| Mission San Jose (9–12) | Warriors | High | 41717 Palm Avenue | Mission San Jose | 94539 |
| Mission Valley | Beavers | Elementary | 41700 Denise Street | Mission San Jose | 94539 |
| Niles | Bulldogs | Elementary | 37141 Second Street | Washington | 94536 |
| Oliveria | Eagles | Elementary | 4180 Alder Avenue | American | 94536 |
| Parkmont | Panthers | Elementary | 2601 Parkside Drive | Washington | 94538 |
| Patterson | Panthers | Elementary | 35521 Cabrillo Drive | American | 94536 |
| Robertson/Vista Alternative | Rebels | High | 4455 Seneca Park Avenue | Irvington | 94538 |
| Thornton | Thunderbolts | Middle | 4357 Thornton Avenue | American | 94536 |
| Vallejo Mill | Dolphins | Elementary | 38569 Canyon Heights Drive | Washington | 94536 |
| Walters | Warriors | Middle | 39600 Logan Drive | Kennedy | 94538 |
| Warm Springs | Wolves | Elementary | 47370 Warm Springs Boulevard | Irvington | 94539 |
| Warwick | Wizards | Elementary | 3375 Warwick Road | American | 94555 |
| Washington | Huskies | High | 38442 Fremont Boulevard | Washington | 94536 |
| Weibel | Wildcats | Elementary | 45135 South Grimmer Boulevard | Irvington | 94539 |

There are 8 schools in American attendance area, 11 in Irvington, 12 in Kennedy, 6 in Mission San Jose, and 8 in Washington.
