= Glenmoor Gardens =

Neighborhood in central Fremont, California

'Glenmoor Gardens' is an affluent neighborhood of nearly 1,900 homes in central Fremont, California and is Fremont's largest subdivision. The neighborhood is bounded, approximately, by I-880 on the west, Mowry Avenue to the south, Central Avenue to the north, and Fremont Boulevard on the east.

In the 19th century there were seven large farms in the Glenmoor area, including those of Garrett Norris, Herman Eggers, Robert Blacow, Martin Brophy, and Ashley Cameron. Glenmoor Gardens was largely developed on the sites of the Norris, Eggers, Cameron, and Brophy farms. The lands of Norris and Eggers covered 275 acres between Blacow Road and Fremont Boulevard; the Cameron and Brophy farms covered 320 acres below Blacow Road.

== The Glenmoor Companies ==
In the 1950s and 1960s, Glenmoor Gardens was developed as tracts of single family residences, with a neighborhood commercial area and several apartment buildings at its center, by Glenmoor Homes, Inc., and other businesses owned by James L. Reeder, Sr., James Meyer, and Ralph Cotter, Jr. They also built several apartment and shopping complexes in the Fremont area.

== Glenmoor Gardens Homeowners Association ==
The Glenmoor Gardens Homeowners Association is a governing body of elected homeowners in the neighborhood. The association has a design review committee that oversees house appearance, lawn care, remodels, fencing and/or any visual impact from a property to the rest of the neighborhood.

The association owns two parks. Both Meyer Park and Alta Park have picnic areas and children's play areas open to all residents.

=== Glenmoor Gardens Swim and Tennis Club ===
Glenmoor Gardens Homeowners Association has two swimming pools, one at Meyer Park and one at Alta Park. also 3 lighted Tennis Courts at Alta Park with 2 Basketball Courts. All facilities are available to Glenmoor homeowners with a yearly subscription or for a daily fee.

=== Events ===
Major holidays are marked by festivities. There is a neighborhood Fourth of July parade, with bikes, strollers and even lawn mowers decked out and on parade. After the parade, the pool at Alta Park is open for a free swim and many residents participate in a BBQ cookout.

A 110-foot-tall (34 m) Redwood Tree in Meyer Park is lit to welcome the Christmas holiday season with caroling and a visit from Santa, too. Halloween carnivals, an Easter Bunny visit and an annual flea market (all volunteer coordinated and run) continue the festive, neighborhood spirit throughout the year.

== Education ==
Glenmoor is in the Fremont Unified School District. Three of the District's schools are located in Glenmoor: Glenmoor Elementary School, Maloney Elementary School, and Mattos Elementary School. Glenmoor and Maloney are in the attendance area for Centerville Junior High School and Washington High School. Students in the Mattos attendance area go on to Walters Junior High School and John F. Kennedy High School. Glenmoor is also in the Ohlone Community College District.
