= James Logan High School =

Public high school in California, United States

Location
- 1800 H Street; Union City, California 94587; United States; 37°35′23.09″N 122°1′37.196″W

Information
- Type: Public high school
- Established: 1959
- School district: New Haven Unified School District
- Principal: Ron Polk
- Teaching staff: 128.97 (FTE)
- Grades: 9-12
- Enrollment: 3,096 (2024–2025)
- Student to teacher ratio: 24.01
- Campus size: 64 acres (260,000 m^{2})
- Colors: Black and red
- Mascot: Jimmy the Colt
- Newspaper: The Courier
- Yearbook: Epitaph
- Website: www.jameslogan.org

James Logan High School (also known as JLHS or Logan) is a public high school located in Union City, California. It is part of the New Haven Unified School District in the San Francisco Bay Area.

== Awards ==
In 1994 and 1998, Logan was recognized as a California Distinguished School by the California Department of Education. Logan was recognized in 1983 and 1987 as a Blue Ribbon School by the U.S. Department of Education.

== History ==
James Logan High School was named after pioneer James Logan, who came to Alvarado (former settlement, now part of Union City) from Derry, Ireland in 1885. After World War II, the growth of Union City was so tremendous, a new high school was built to serve that district. James Logan served on the Washington Union High School Board of Trustees for many years and had used his own farming equipment to condition the sports field at the new school, and the school was aptly named after his service and commitment to local education.

== Athletics ==
James Logan High School is a member of the Mission Valley Athletic League (MVAL), which includes high schools in Fremont as well as Newark Memorial High School in Newark, and Moreau Catholic High School in Hayward. The league competes within the North Coast Section of the California Interscholastic Federation.

== Notable alumni ==
- Stephen Abas - 2004 Olympic silver medalist in freestyle wrestling
- Tuineau Alipate - former CFL and NFL player
- Otis Amey - former wide receiver for the San Francisco 49ers
- Vince Amey - former NFL player
- Joey Bragg - actor on the Disney Channel show Liv and Maddie
- Darryl Byrd - former NFL player
- Vicky Galindo - Softball player.
- Dejon Gomes - former professional football safety.
- Vickie Guerrero - professional wrestling personality, signed to All Elite Wrestling
- Matthew Harper - NFL assistant coach, currently with the Los Angeles Rams
- Jonn Hart - R&B singer
- Cassey Ho - YouTube fitness guru
- Aaron Ledesma - Major League Baseball infielder for the New York Mets, Tampa Bay Devil Rays, Baltimore Orioles, and Colorado Rockies
- SuChin Pak - MTV News reporter
- Danielle Reyes - contestant on CBS's Big Brother 3 (2002) and Big Brother 7: All-Stars (2006)
- Nate Robinson - Chicago Bulls player (moved (back) to Seattle before senior year)
- Robyn Rodriguez - academic and chair of Asian American Studies at UC Davis
- David Shaw - currently the passing game coordinator for the Detroit Lions of the National Football League (NFL).
- Donnie Spragan - former NFL linebacker for the Miami Dolphins
- Kelli White - track and field athlete involved in the BALCO scandal
- Roy Williams - former NFL safety
- Nahshon Wright - defensive back for the New York Jets
- Rejzohn Wright - defensive back for the New Orleans Saints
