= Mission Valley (disambiguation) =

Mission Valley, San Diego is a wide river valley in San Diego, California, United States.

Mission Valley may refer to:

- Mission Valley Center (San Diego Trolley station)
- Westfield Mission Valley, shopping mall in San Diego
- Mission Valley (El Paso), Texas
- Mission Valley Elementary School in Fremont, California
- Mission Valley High School (Kansas)
- Mission Valley Athletic League, an East Bay sports league in the San Francisco Bay Area
