= Newark Memorial High School =

Public school in Newark, California, United States

Location
- 39375 Cedar Boulevard; Newark, California 94560; United States; 37°31′19.02″N 122°0′5.04″W

Information
- Type: Public high school
- Established: 1983
- School district: Newark Unified School District
- School code: 0130054
- CEEB code: 052114
- Principal: Michael Murphy
- Teaching staff: 52.79 (FTE)
- Grades: 9–12
- Enrollment: 1,367 (2024-2025)
- Student to teacher ratio: 25.90
- Campus size: 44.3 acres (17.9 ha)
- Campus type: Suburb
- Colors: Royal blue and gold
- Fight song: Go Big Blue
- Athletics: 52 teams in 16 sports
- Mascot: Cougar
- Team name: Cougars; formerly the Knights (1963–1981) and Patriots (1973–1981)
- Rival: James Logan High School
- Accreditation: Western Association of Schools and Colleges
- Newspaper: Cougar Chronicle
- Yearbook: The Pride
- Feeder schools: Newark Junior High School
- Athletic Conference: Bay Shore Conference
- Athletic League: Mission Valley Athletic League
- CIF Section: North Coast Section
- Website: nmhs.newarkunified.org

Newark Memorial High School (NMHS) is a comprehensive high school in Newark, California, United States. It is part of the Newark Unified School District (NUSD).

== History ==
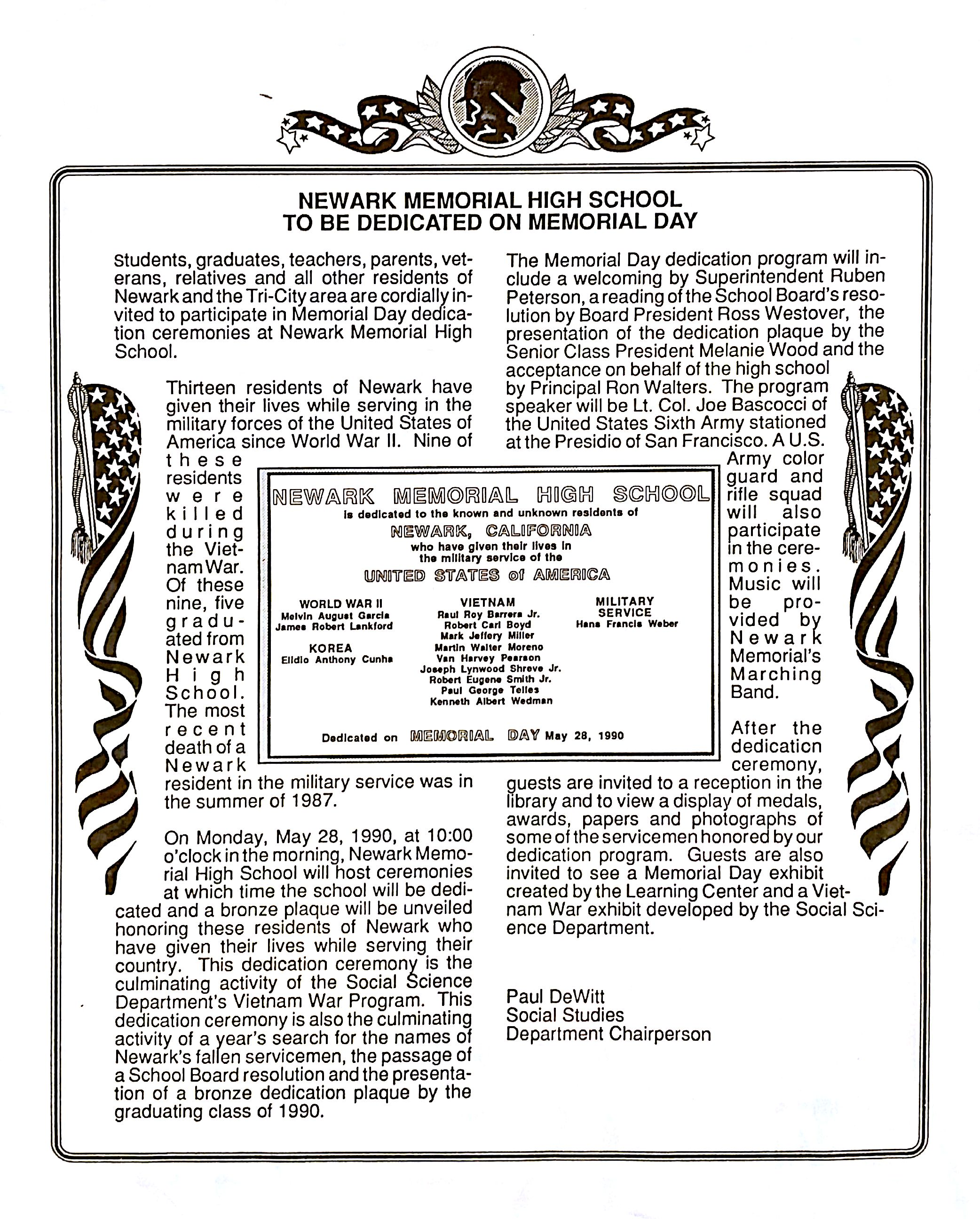
The original mailer announcing the dedication of Newark Memorial's campus as the memorial to honor all Newark residents who have given their lives in the service of the nation

Newark Memorial High School was formed in 1983 as part of a school consolidation program instituted by NUSD. Prior to this, Newark had two high schools (Newark High School on Lafayette Avenue, and Memorial High School on Cedar Boulevard) and two "intermediate schools" for grades 7–8 (M. D. Silva Intermediate School on Thornton Avenue and John I. MacGregor Intermediate School on Cedar Boulevard).

In 1983, both M. D. Silva and John I. MacGregor were closed and the former Newark High School was converted into Newark's only junior high school, Newark Junior High School. Memorial High School was then renamed Newark Memorial High School and became the sole high school in Newark. The mascots of both Newark High School (Knights) and Memorial High School (Patriots) were abandoned in favor of the Cougars.

== Campus ==
The Technology Center was opened in 2002. The 25,000-square-foot (2,300 m^{2}) facility integrates technology, science, mathematics and engineering in its curriculum, with a student testing and reporting (STAR) lab and the infrastructure for more than 1000 computers. The Technology Center includes a television production center with six edit labs, audio/video production rooms, a television studio with a 25' electronic screen, two project rooms for desktop publishing, four classrooms designated for digital photography, robots, engineering and communications, and specialty math and science labs. High-tech firms with local offices, including Sun Microsystems and AT&T/Comcast, were involved in the planning.

The Student Commons was dedicated in 2004, as part of a project that included renovation and expansion of the cafeteria. The design supports both school and community functions.

Sustainable design was incorporated in both the Tech Center and the Student Commons, including the use of durable materials (e.g., porcelain and pre-cast concrete panels), which will reduce the long-term impacts and cost of maintenance, and natural light and ventilation. Clerestory windows provide energy savings and a more comfortable environment. The designs for the Student Commons and the Tech Center earned awards for Deems Lewis McKinley in 2004 from the Coalition for Adequate School Housing / American Institute of Architects California Council (CASH / AIA CC).

The NMHS theater is used by students, along with various outside groups, including the local Stage 1 Community Theatre for their five-production season.

In 2004 the school opened a 2,576-seat multipurpose gymnasium. The gym, known to students as the New Gym (to differentiate between the original gym between the 700 and 500 buildings), hosts volleyball, basketball, and badminton matches.

== Students ==
As of the 2018-2019 school year, there were 1711 students enrolled. Racial and ethnic makeup was 52.4% Hispanic, 14.9% non-Hispanic white, 13% Asian, 10.8% Filipino, 4.2% African-American, 2.7% two or more races, 1.5% Pacific Islander, and 0.1% Native American.

During the year, there were 93 suspensions. The average class sizes were 27 for English and science, and 28 for mathematics and social science. Of the students graduating, 27.2% had completed the course requirements for admission to the University of California or the California State University systems.

== Faculty ==
As of the 2017–2018 school year, there were 81 teachers, of whom 76 had full credentials. There were the equivalent of 4 academic counselors, responsible for an average of 438 students each, and one librarian.

== Extracurricular activities ==
Newark Memorial competes in 13 boys' sports and 14 girls' sports. Newark competes in the Mission Valley Athletic League (MVAL), of the Bay Shore Area of North Coast Section, sanctioned by the California Interscholastic Federation. The seven other schools in the MVAL are James Logan High School of Union City, Moreau Catholic High School of Hayward, and the five public high schools in Fremont: American High School, John F. Kennedy High School, Irvington High School, Mission San Jose High School, and Washington High School.

Since 1983, five Newark Memorial coaches have received NCS Honor Coach Awards: Sheri Boots, 1983, softball; Dennis Frese, 1986, girls' basketball; Jay Guerin, 1987, golf; Vance Wahlberg, 1989, and Paul Weiss, 2001, badminton.

The school has staged productions including The Laramie Project, Les Misérables, Chicago, Aida, Urinetown, Beauty and the Beast, Assassins, Jesus Christ Superstar, Rent, The Wiz, Grease, A Streetcar Named Desire, Harvey, Cinderella, and Little Shop of Horrors.

The Newark Memorial High School band, which serves both as a marching and as an all-wind symphonic band, has performed during the Newark Days parade in Newark, the Double-Ten Parade in San Francisco, and in the Oracle Arena for a Newark Cougars game.

Newark Memorial holds an annual cultural program in March known as HATS, which stands for Hands Across Time & Space (originally stood for Have A Tolerant Spirit). It aims to allow students to display their culture in a creative way and learn about others. HATS is characterized by a series of cultural dances, performed by various clubs such as Filipino Student Union, MeCHA, Black Student Union, Creators University, Polynesian Club, and East Asian Student Union. Each participating club choreographs a dance to cultural music. Newark Memorial also has a Ballet Folklorico that has been in existence for over 10 years.

Newark Memorial is one of the many high schools included in the Puente Program. The program's goal is to increase the number of underrepresented students that attend a four year university after high school. Puente is also a club at Newark Memorial, allowing student opportunities to build community.

== Notable alumni ==
- Terry Alderete - businesswoman
- John Anton, class of 1973 (Newark High School Knights) - former NASL professional soccer player (Edmonton Drillers and San Diego Soccers); player for University of San Francisco (USF) Dons, NCAA Division I soccer champions in 1975 and 1976
- Lee Atack, class of 1969 (Newark High School Knights) - former NASL & MISL professional soccer player (Los Angeles Aztecs, Oakland Stompers, and Edmonton Drillers)
- Paul Bostaph, class of 1983 - drummer with Forbidden, Slayer, Testament, Exodus and Systematic
- Marquin Chandler, class of 2000 - professional basketball player
- George Fernandez, class of 1979 (Memorial High School Patriots) - former MISL and NPSL professional soccer player (Cleveland Force, Los Angeles Lazers, San Diego Soccers, Cleveland Crunch, Cincinnati Silverbacks)
- Chris Flexen, class of 2012 - MLB pitcher in the Chicago Cubs organization.
- Mike Hollingsworth, class of 1994 - Supervising Director of Netflix's BoJack Horseman
- Joey Lucchesi, class of 2011 - MLB pitcher in the Los Angeles Angels organization.
- Ron Thompson, class of 1971 - blues guitarist and keyboardist; founder of the Resistors
- Thuy, Vietnamese American singer and songwriter
- Christopher Titus - stand-up comedian; star of Fox TV sitcom Titus
- Vance Walberg - former head basketball coach of Pepperdine University; NBA assistant coach
- Elaine Welteroth, class of 2004 – editor-in-chief, Teen Vogue
