= List of Fremont Unified School District elementary schools =

The following is a list of Fremont Unified School District schools. There are 28 elementary schools in the Fremont Unified School District, which is located in the city of Fremont, California. The list is organized by the attendance area of each elementary school, identifying the high school the school feeds into.

== American Attendance Area ==
=== Ardenwood Elementary School ===
Ardenwood Elementary School is an elementary school in Fremont, California. It is located at 33955 Emilia Lane 94555 and was established in 1985. It is one of 28 elementary schools in the city belonging to the Fremont Unified School District. Ardenwood is part of the American Attendance area and students from Ardenwood Elementary eventually go to Thornton middle School and American High School

=== Brookvale Elementary School ===
Brookvale Elementary School is an elementary school in Fremont, California. It is located at 3400 Nicolet Ave 94536.[1] It is one of 28 elementary schools in the city belonging to the Fremont Unified School District. Brookvale is part of the American Attendance area and goes to American High School and Thornton middle School.[2]

=== Forest Park Elementary School ===
Forest Park Elementary School is an elementary school in Fremont, California, founded in 1993. It is located at 34400 Maybird Circle 94555. It is one of 28 elementary schools in the city belonging to the Fremont Unified School District. Forest Park is part of the American Attendance area, and goes to American High School and Thornton middle School.

The school does not have diversified demographic (81% students being Asians). Its boys basketball team is the area champions for 1999, 2000, 2009, 2010, and 2011. Its mascot is the Ranger.

=== Oliveira Elementary School ===
Oliveira Elementary School is an elementary school in Fremont, California. It is located at 4180 Alder Ave 94536. It is one of 28 elementary schools in the city belonging to the Fremont Unified School District. Oliveira is part of the American Attendance area, and goes to American High School and Thornton middle School.

=== Patterson Elementary School ===
Patterson Elementary School is an elementary school in Fremont, California. It is located at 35521 Cabrillo Drive 94536. It is one of 28 elementary schools in the city belonging to the Fremont Unified School District. Patterson is part of the American Attendance area, and goes to American High School and Thornton middle School.

=== Warwick Elementary School ===
Warwick Elementary School is an elementary school in Fremont, California. It is located at 3375 Warwick Rd 94555. It is one of 28 elementary schools in the area belonging to the Fremont Unified School District. Warwick is part of the American Attendance area, and goes to American High School and Thornton middle School . It was established in 1973 with only 8 classrooms. The current principal is Barbara Ochoa.

== Irvington Attendance Area ==
=== Harvey Green Elementary School ===
Harvey Green Elementary School is an elementary school in Fremont, California. It is located at 42875 Gatewood St. 94538. It is one of 28 elementary schools in the city belonging to the Fremont Unified School District. Harvey Green is part of the Irvington Attendance area, and goes to Irvington High School and Horner middle School. The school mascot is Hornets and the current principal is Mrs. Johnson.

=== Grimmer Elementary School ===
Grimmer Elementary School is an elementary school in Fremont, California. It is located at 43030 Newport Dr. 94538. It is a California Distinguished School. It is one of the 28 elementary schools in the city belonging to the Fremont Unified School District. Grimmer is part of the Irvington Attendance area, and goes to Irvington High School and Horner middle School. The current principal is Matt Kaufman.

=== Hirsch Elementary School ===
Hirsch Elementary School is an elementary school in Fremont, California. It is located at 41399 Chapel Way 94538. It is one of 28 elementary schools in the city belonging to the Fremont Unified School District. Hirsch is part of the Irvington Attendance area, and goes to Irvington High School and Horner middle School.

=== Leitch Elementary School ===
The front of the school. Shows the main parking lot and office.

Leitch Elementary School is an elementary school in Fremont, California. It is located at 47100 Fernald Street, Fremont 94539. It is one of 28 elementary schools in the city belonging to the Fremont Unified School District. Leitch is part of the Irvington Attendance area, and goes to Irvington High School and Horner middle School. James Leitch is the only grade K–2 elementary school in the Fremont Unified School District.

=== Warm Springs Elementary School ===
Warm Springs Elementary School is a public elementary school in Fremont, California. is located at 47370 Warm Springs Blvd 94539. It serves students in from third through the fifth grade and is one of 28 elementary schools in the city belonging to the Fremont Unified School District (FUSD). Warm Springs is part of the Irvington Attendance area, and goes to Irvington High School and Horner middle School.

=== Weibel Elementary School ===
Weibel Elementary School is an elementary school in Fremont, California. It is located at 45135 So. Grimmer Blvd. 94539. It is one of 28 elementary schools in the city belonging to the Fremont Unified School District. Due to the 2001 Fremont Boundary Line Redrawing Controversy, Weibel is now part of the Irvington Attendance area, and goes to Irvington High School and Horner middle School.

Getting its name from Fred E. Weibel who owned vineyards in the area until the 1980s and was on Fremont's school board, Weibel Elementary finished among the top schools in standardized testing among other Fremont elementary schools. Asians easily make up the majority of the population of the students attending Weibel as many of their parents have settled in the area working jobs in the Silicon Valley.

== Kennedy Attendance Area ==
=== Azevada Elementary School ===
Azevada Elementary School is an elementary school in Fremont, California. It is located at 39450 Royal Palm Drive 94538. It is one of 28 elementary schools in the city belonging to the Fremont Unified School District. Azevada is part of the Kennedy Attendance area, and goes to John F. Kennedy High School and Walters Middle School.

=== Blacow Elementary School ===
Blacow Elementary School is an elementary school in Fremont, California. It is located at 40404 Sundale Drive 94538. It is one of 28 elementary schools in the city belonging to the Fremont Unified School District. Blacow is part of the Kennedy Attendance area, and goes to John F. Kennedy High School and Walters Middle School.

Blacow offers a Spanish two-way immersion program as well as an English curriculum. More than 40 percent of the student population qualifies for free or reduced lunch. The campus includes a large lawn and many trees. The multi-use room serves as a lunch room, auditorium and gym. Every year there is a Halloween Carnival as well as a Variety Show and other events.

=== Brier Elementary School ===
Brier Elementary School is an elementary school in Fremont, California. It is located at 39201 Sundale Drive 94538. It is one of 28 elementary schools in the city belonging to the Fremont Unified School District. Brier is part of the Kennedy Attendance area, and goes to John F. Kennedy High School and Walters Middle School. Its current principal is Julie Williams.

=== J. Haley Durham Elementary School ===
J. Haley Durham Elementary School is an elementary school in Fremont, California. It is located at 40292 Leslie St 94538. It is one of 28 elementary schools in the city belonging to the Fremont Unified School District. Durham is part of the Kennedy Attendance area, and goes to John F. Kennedy High School and Walters Middle School.

=== Mattos Elementary School ===
Mattos Elementary School is a Science Magnet elementary school in Fremont, California. It is located at 37944 Farwell Drive 94536. It is one of 28 elementary schools in the city belonging to the Fremont Unified School District. Mattos is part of the Kennedy Attendance area, and goes to John F. Kennedy High School and Walters Middle School.

=== Millard Elementary School ===
Millard Elementary School is an elementary school in Fremont, California. It is located at 5200 Valpey Park Drive 94538. It is one of 28 elementary schools in the city belonging to the Fremont Unified School District. Millard is part of the Kennedy Attendance area, and goes to John F. Kennedy High School and Walters Middle School.

== Mission Attendance Area ==
=== Chadbourne Elementary School ===
Joshua Chadbourne Elementary School is an elementary school in Fremont, California named after Joshua Chadbourne. It is located at 801 Plymouth Ave., Fremont, CA 94539. Built on part of the Chadbourne family apricot orchard, the school was dedicated on September 22, 1960. It is one of 28 elementary schools in the city belonging to the Fremont Unified School District. Chadbourne is part of the Mission San Jose Attendance area - its students attend Hopkins middle School after graduation and move on to Mission San Jose High School for high school.

Chadbourne Elementary School was designated as a National Blue Ribbon School in 1989 and again in 2013.

Chadbourne has also been designated a California Distinguished School four times, most recently in 2006.

=== Gomes Elementary School ===
John M. Gomes Elementary School
- 555 Lemos Lane; Fremont, CA 94539

Information
- Type: Public
- Established: 1970
- Principal: Pamela Hughes
- Faculty: approx. 60
- Enrollment: 889
- Information: (510) 656-3414
- Colors: Green and White
- Website: www.fremont.k12.ca/us/gomes

John M. Gomes Elementary School, more commonly known as Gomes Elementary, is an elementary school in Fremont, California. It is located at 555 Lemos Lane 94539. It is one of 28 elementary schools in the city belonging to the Fremont Unified School District. This school has an enrollment of approximately 889 students. Its current principal is Pamela Hughes and its mascot is the Gomes Gopher. The school colors are green and white. Gomes is part of the Mission San Jose Attendance area, and its students move on to Hopkins middle School, and then to Mission San Jose High School.

==== Achievements ====
Gomes is a nationally and state recognized highly achieving school. Its highest achievement was the status of a National Blue Ribbon School in 1987 and in 2018.

==== Demographics ====
Gomes Elementary's approximate level of enrollment is 889 students total. Gomes Elementary lacks any significant non-white/non-Asian population. The school has a student population of 85 percent Asians and 11 percent Whites, 2 percent Latinos, while the remaining populations are all at less than one percent. Due to this fact, only the test scores for Asians and Whites are reported for the school since only data is reported for those populations with significant numbers. Additionally, male students slightly outnumber female students.

37.55077°N 121.94882°W

=== Mission San Jose Elementary School ===
Mission San Jose Elementary School is an elementary school in Fremont, California. It is one of 28 elementary schools in the city belonging to the Fremont Unified School District. Mission San Jose is part of the Mission San Jose Attendance area, and transfers into Hopkins middle School and on to Mission San Jose High School. Mission San Jose Elementary are the champions of basketball for many years. MSJE is also one of the best schools in California.

Its mascot is the mustang.

=== Mission Valley Elementary School ===
Mission Valley Elementary School is an elementary school in Fremont, California. It is one of 28 elementary schools in the city belonging to the Fremont Unified School District, located at 41700 Denise St 94539. Mission Valley is part of the Mission San Jose Attendance area, and feeds into Hopkins middle School and on to Mission San Jose High School.

Its mascot is the Mission Valley Beaver.

== Washington Attendance Area ==
=== Cabrillo Elementary School ===
Cabrillo Elementary School is an elementary school in Fremont, California. It is located at 36700 San Pedro Drive 94536. It is one of 28 elementary schools in the city belonging to the Fremont Unified School District. Cabrillo is part of the Washington Attendance area, and goes to Washington High School and Centerville middle School.

=== Glenmoor Elementary School ===
Glenmoor Elementary School is an elementary school in Fremont, California. It is located at 4620 Mattos Drive 94536. It is one of 28 elementary schools in the city belonging to the Fremont Unified School District. Glenmoor is part of the Washington Attendance area, and goes to Washington High School and Centerville Junior High School. The school's mascot is the Wildcats.

=== Tom Maloney Elementary School ===
Tom Maloney Elementary School is an elementary school in Fremont, California. It is located at 38700 Logan Drive 94536. It is one of 28 elementary schools in the city belonging to the Fremont Unified School District. It opened in 1961 as the Glenmoor and Glen Manor developments were populated. Its mascot is the Bulldog and the school colors are Royal Blue and White. Maloney is part of the Washington Attendance area, and goes to Washington High School and Centerville Junior High School.

=== Niles Elementary School ===
Niles Elementary School is an elementary school in Fremont, California. It is located at 37141 Second Street 94536. It is one of 28 elementary schools in the city belonging to the Fremont Unified School District. One of the oldest schools in the area, it was constructed around the 1930s. The school mascot is the bulldog and the school colors are green and white and grey. Niles has a basketball team, a soccer team, and a cheerleading squad. It is part of the Washington attendance area and goes to Washington High School and Centerville Junior High School.

Niles Elementary has instituted a Junior Safety Patrol program that encourages community involvement and leadership by having select 5th and 6th graders facilitate the loading and unloading zone as students come and go from school. This program is overseen by Niles Traffic Safety Coordinator, Robin Maccan.

=== Parkmont Elementary School ===
Parkmont Elementary School is an elementary school in Fremont, California. It is located at 2601 Parkside Drive 94536. It is one of 28 elementary schools in the city belonging to the Fremont Unified School District. The principal of Parkmont Elementary is Walter Lewis. Parkmont is part of the Washington Attendance area, and goes to Washington High School and Centerville Junior High School. Its school mascot is the panther, and has a basketball and soccer team.

=== Vallejo Mill Elementary School ===
Vallejo Mill Elementary School is an elementary school in Fremont, California. It is located at 38569 Canyon Heights Drive 94536. It is one of 28 elementary schools in the city belonging to the Fremont Unified School District. Vallejo Mill is part of the Washington Attendance area, and goes to Washington High School and Centerville Junior High School.
