= Durham Elementary School =

Durham Elementary School can refer to:

- Durham Elementary School, a public kindergarten through sixth grade institution in Fremont, California.
- A school in Durham, Maine
