= American High School (California) =

Public secondary school in Fermont, California, United States

Location
- 36300 Fremont Boulevard; Fremont, California 94536; United States; 37°33′53″N 122°00′57″W

Information
- Type: Public high school
- Motto: Diversity and Dedication; Enhance Learning and Education.
- Established: 1972
- School district: Fremont Unified School District
- Principal: Sandhya Sharma
- Teaching staff: 103.77 (FTE)
- Grades: 9-12
- Enrollment: 2,694 (2025–2026)
- Student to teacher ratio: 25.2
- Campus size: 42.79 acres (173,200 m^{2})
- Campus type: Suburban
- Colors: Red, blue and white
- Nickname: Eagles
- Publication: Eagle Nation
- Newspaper: Eagle Era
- Yearbook: Aerie
- Website: fremontunified.org/american/

American High School (AHS) is a public secondary school located in Fremont, California, United States. It is one of five public high schools within the Fremont Unified School District. The school receives its students through the American High School attendance area boundary set by the district. It opened in 1972 and serves grades 9–12. The school is administered by principal Sandhya Sharma. The California Department of Education lists American High as an active traditional public high school operated by Fremont Unified School District."American High - School Directory Details". California Department of Education.

American High School was designated a California Distinguished School from 2005 to 2009 and received California Gold Ribbon School recognition from 2017 to 2019. It was recognized as a California Distinguished School again in 2019. The school offers Advanced Placement, honors, engineering, computer science, visual and performing arts, world language, and career-oriented programs."American High School". Fremont Unified School District.

The school had 2,618 students during the 2024–2025 school year and 2,694 students during the 2025–2026 school year, according to California school enrollment data."American High School Profile". Ed-Data.

== Athletics ==
American High School is a member of the Mission Valley Athletic League (MVAL), which includes high schools in Fremont as well as Newark Memorial High School in Newark, James Logan High School in Union City, and Moreau Catholic High School in Hayward. The league competes within the North Coast Section of the California Interscholastic Federation.

American High School is rivals with local school Washington High School, and the rivalry is called the Battle of the Boulevard.

== Incidents and controversies ==
=== 1990s violence ===
American High School experienced incidents of gang-related violence during the 1990s. In April 1995, a fight involving as many as 100 youths occurred on campus after a dispute between rival groups. One student was stabbed and three other people were injured. Police arrested several teenagers in connection with the incident.Lee, Henry K. (April 12, 1995). "4 Hurt in Fremont School Melee / Possible gang fight involved up to 100 youths, police say". SFGate.

=== 2020 burglary and vandalism ===
In April 2020, four teenagers were arrested after police linked them to a series of burglaries and vandalism that included a burglary at American High School. Police said a classroom at the school had been vandalized and an unloaded semiautomatic firearm was found near a discarded backpack in one of the classrooms."4 Fremont Teens Arrested For Local Crime Spree; School Vandalized, Homes Burglarized". CBS San Francisco. April 3, 2020.

=== 2022 noose incident ===
In April 2022, a rope tied into the shape of a noose was discovered in a tree on the American High School campus. Fremont Unified School District officials described the noose as a symbol of hate and violence and said they were working with the Fremont Police Department to identify those responsible. The district said additional campus supervision and counseling resources would be provided."Police investigate noose found at Fremont's American High School". ABC7 News. April 7, 2022.

=== 2022 threats and hate-crime investigation ===
In May 2022, American High School personnel notified police about social-media posts made by a student that included threats of gun violence against a school employee and racial epithets. The Fremont Police Department said the student was arrested and booked into juvenile hall on felony terrorist-threat and hate-crime allegations. Police also served a search warrant at the student's home."May 25, 2022 Incident: Terrorist threats and hate crime investigation". Fremont Police Department. May 25, 2022.

== Notable alumni ==
- Yousef Erakat, YouTuber known as FouseyTube
- Miles Turpin, NFL football player
- James Cannida, NFL football player
- Robert Flynn, lead vocalist, rhythm guitarist and founder of heavy metal band Machine Head
- Michelle Go, Asian American woman who was pushed onto a train track in New York City in 2022
- Steve Lewis, 400-meter runner who won three gold medals at the 1988 and 1992 Summer Olympics
- Ishika Jaiswal, international badminton athlete
- Joel Souza, filmmaker
- Garry Tan, venture capitalist and entrepreneur
- Len Wiseman, filmmaker

== References in popular culture ==
"American High," the eighth track from Machine Head's 2001 album Supercharger, references American High School, the alma mater of lead singer Robert Flynn."Machine Head". Spotify.

== Demographics ==
Student enrollment was 2,618 during the 2024–2025 school year. California enrollment data indicates that the school remains one of the largest public high schools in Fremont Unified School District."American High School Profile". Ed-Data.

The school has a predominantly Asian student population, with Hispanic, White, Filipino, African American, multiracial, Pacific Islander, and American Indian students also represented.
