= Robert Turbin =

American football player (born 1989)

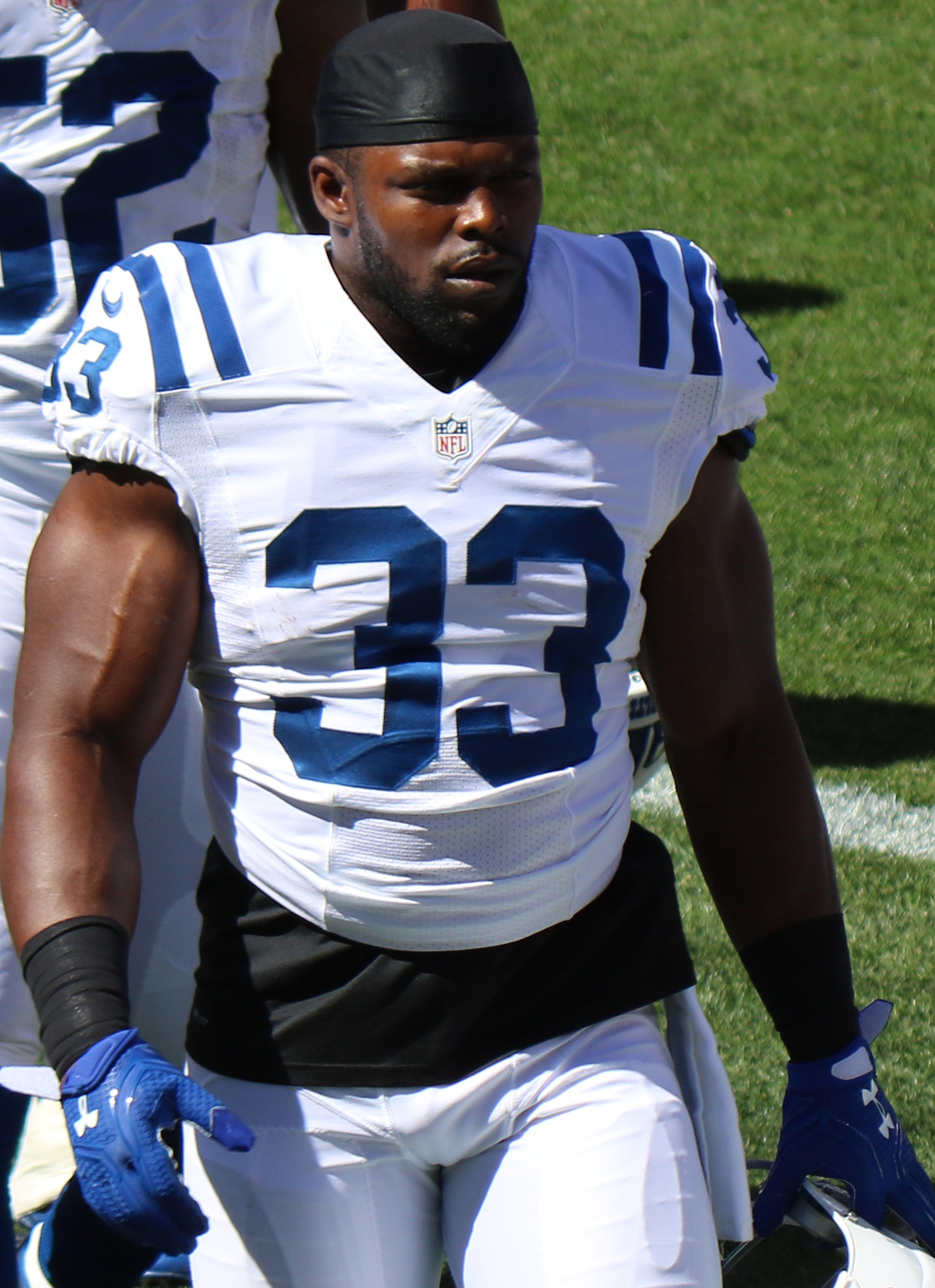
- Turbin with the Indianapolis Colts in 2016

No. 22, 27, 23, 33, 34
- Position: Running back

Personal information
- Born: December 2, 1989 (age 36); Oakland, California, U.S.
- Listed height: 5 ft 10 in (1.78 m)
- Listed weight: 225 lb (102 kg)

Career information
- High school: Irvington (Fremont, California)
- College: Utah State (2007–2011)
- NFL draft: 2012: 4th round, 106th overall pick

Career history
- Seattle Seahawks (2012–2014); Cleveland Browns (2015); Dallas Cowboys (2015); Indianapolis Colts (2016–2018); Seattle Seahawks (2019); FCF Beasts (2021); FCF Glacier Boyz (2021)

Awards and highlights
- Super Bowl champion (XLVIII); WAC Offensive Player of the Year (2011); First-team All-WAC (2011); Single season rushing touchdowns leader for Utah State (19 TDs)

Career NFL statistics
- Rushing yards: 1,354
- Rushing average: 3.8
- Rushing touchdowns: 9
- Receptions: 86
- Receiving yards: 688
- Receiving touchdowns: 3
- Stats at Pro Football Reference

Robert James Turbin (born December 2, 1989) is an American former professional football player who was a running back in the National Football League (NFL). He played college football for the Utah State Aggies, and was selected in the fourth round of the 2012 NFL draft by the Seahawks. With the Seahawks, he won Super Bowl XLVIII over the Denver Broncos. He has also played for the Cleveland Browns, Dallas Cowboys, and Indianapolis Colts. He works at CBS Sports as a color commentator for their college football and NFL broadcasts.

== Early life ==
Turbin played high school football at Irvington High School in Fremont, California. As a junior, he led the varsity team to a Mission Valley Athletic League football championship, and his team would go on to play in the NCS Division 3A East Bay Conference championship, where they lost to Las Lomas High 21–14. He was named first-team all-league running back as well as an all-league defensive back as a senior, and earned the league Defensive Player of the Year award. He rushed 143 times for 1,232 yards and 14 touchdowns and had nine receptions for 103 yards, and defensively, he recorded six interceptions. He was also a two-year letterwinner in basketball as well as track & field.

== College career ==
Turbin enrolled at Utah State University and played for the Aggies football team. As a redshirt sophomore in 2009, he gained 1,296 rushing yards and 418 receiving yards and scored 18 touchdowns. In the annual rivalry game against the Utah Utes, Turbin set a school record with a 96-yard touchdown run. He missed the 2010 season due to a knee injury, but he returned in 2011 as the Aggies' lead running back. In the first half of the 2011 season, Turbin ran for at least 100 yards in five of the six games. Turbin's 1,517 rushing yards during the 2011 season ranked 10th among NCAA Division I FBS players. In 2011, Turbin set the single season rushing touchdowns record for Utah State with 19 rushing touchdowns. He won the WAC Offensive Player of the Year.

== Professional career ==
Pre-draft measurables
Height	Weight	Arm length	Hand span	Wingspan	40-yard dash	10-yard split	20-yard split	20-yard shuttle	Three-cone drill	Vertical jump	Broad jump	Bench press
5 ft 10 in (1.78 m)	222 lb (101 kg)	31 in (0.79 m)	9 3/4 in (0.25 m)	6 ft 0 3/8 in (1.84 m)	4.50 s	1.60 s	2.66 s	4.31 s	7.16 s	36 in (0.91 m)	10 ft 2 in (3.10 m)	28 reps
All values from NFL Combine

=== Seattle Seahawks (first stint) ===
On April 28, 2012, Turbin was selected by the Seattle Seahawks in the fourth round with the 106th overall pick in the 2012 NFL draft. That year, he and Bobby Wagner became the highest-drafted pair of USU players since 1980. Playing as a backup to Marshawn Lynch, Turbin ran for 354 yards on 81 carries in his rookie season. In Week 14 against NFC West rival Arizona, Turbin got a significant number of carries in the second half thanks to a blowout, and would have his first career 100 yard game, getting 108 yards on 20 carries in a 58–0 victory.

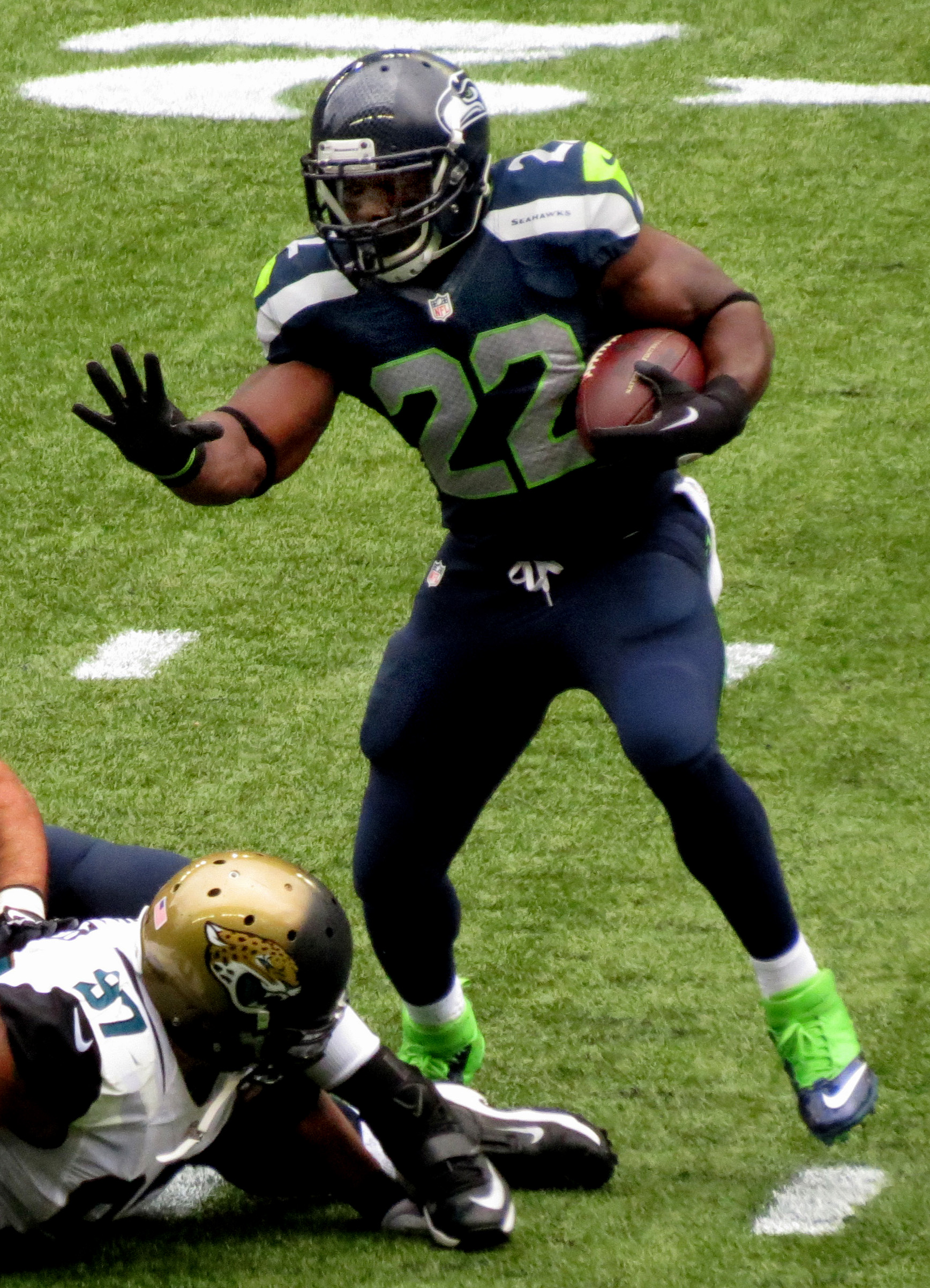
Turbin with the Seahawks in 2013.

Again serving as a backup to Lynch, Turbin got fewer touches in 2013, ending up with 77 carries and 264 rushing yards and 8 receptions for 60 yards. Turbin obtained his first Super Bowl ring in Super Bowl XLVIII, recording 9 carries for 25 yards in the game during the 43–8 victory.

Still the second-string running back in 2014, Turbin scored his first career NFL touchdown in Week 2 against the San Diego Chargers, catching a three-yard touchdown pass from Russell Wilson in the loss. He would score a second in week 13 against the San Francisco 49ers on a 13-yard catch-and-run. He would add a 34-yard catch later in the game, a 19–3 victory. In Week 17 against the St. Louis Rams, Turbin got 11 carries for 53 yards and caught a pass for 13 yards. He ended the season with 74 carries for 310 yards, along with 16 receptions for 186 yards. The Seahawks finished the season 12–4 and advanced to the Super Bowl for the second straight year. In Super Bowl XLIX, Turbin had 2 carries for 21 yards, but the Seahawks lost 28–24 to the New England Patriots as they failed to repeat as champions. After sustaining a high ankle sprain in the third preseason game, he was waived with an injury settlement on September 9, 2015.

=== Cleveland Browns ===
Turbin was claimed off waivers by the Cleveland Browns on September 10, 2015. He spent five weeks recovering from his previous ankle injury. He played in three games before being waived by the team on November 10.

=== Dallas Cowboys ===
In 2015, with the departure of DeMarco Murray in free agency, the Dallas Cowboys acquired a group of running backs for depth purposes at various points during the season. On November 18, Turbin was signed as a free agent to backup Darren McFadden and replace former Seahawks teammate Christine Michael. He began playing as soon as he got to the team, registering seven carries for 35 yards, one receptions for 3 yards and being involved in pass protections assignments, while playing four days later against the Miami Dolphins. His best game came against the Green Bay Packers, when he posted 51 rushing yards and one touchdown. He finished the 2015 season with 50 carries for 199 rushing yards and one rushing touchdown to go along with seven receptions for 23 receiving yards in ten games.

=== Indianapolis Colts ===
Turbin signed with the Indianapolis Colts in March 2016. In the 2016 season, he appeared in 15 games and recorded 164 rushing yards and a career-high seven rushing touchdowns, as well as 179 receiving yards and one score.

On March 13, 2017, Turbin signed a two-year, $4.1 million contract extension with the Colts. Turbin left the game following a left arm injury in the fourth quarter of the Week 6 Monday Night Football game against the Tennessee Titans. He was diagnosed with a dislocated elbow and was placed on injured reserve on October 20, 2017. Overall, he finished the 2017 season with 53 rushing yards, one rushing touchdown, and nine receptions for 56 yards.

On November 9, 2018, Turbin was released by the Colts. In two games in the 2018 season, he had four carries for ten yards.

=== Seattle Seahawks (second stint) ===
On December 23, 2019, the Seattle Seahawks signed Turbin, along with former Seahawks teammate Marshawn Lynch, after injuries to Seattle backs Chris Carson, C. J. Prosise, and Rashaad Penny left them in need of healthy running backs. He appeared in one regular season game and the Seahawks' two playoff games. He played mainly on special teams.

=== FCF Beasts ===
On March 3, 2021, Turbin signed with the FCF Beasts of the Fan Controlled Football midway through the league's season. He made his debut for the Beasts (co-owned by former Seahawks teammate Marshawn Lynch) in their playoff loss to the Glacier Boyz, then was reassigned to the Glacier Boyz for the championship game (FCF teams have fluid rosters that change from week to week). Turbin played a total of two games, rushed for 15 yards and two touchdowns, and caught two passes for 72 yards and two touchdowns.

== Career statistics ==
=== NFL ===
Legend
	Won the Super Bowl
**Bold**	Career high

==== Regular season ====
Year	Team	Games		Rushing					Receiving					Fumbles	
Year	Team	GP	GS	Att	Yds	Avg	Lng	TD	Rec	Yds	Avg	Lng	TD	Fum	Lost
2012	SEA	**16**	0	**80**	**354**	**4.4**	**26**	0	19	181	9.5	20	0	0	0
2013	SEA	**16**	0	77	264	3.4	15	0	8	60	7.5	19	0	**1**	**1**
2014	SEA	**16**	**3**	74	310	4.2	17	0	16	**186**	**11.6**	**34**	**2**	**1**	**1**
2015	CLE	3	0	18	60	3.3	22	0	2	8	4.0	7	0	0	0
2015	DAL	7	0	32	139	4.3	22	1	5	15	5.0	15	0	0	0
2016	IND	15	0	47	164	3.5	18	**7**	**26**	179	6.9	19	1	0	0
2017	IND	6	1	23	53	2.3	7	1	9	56	6.2	16	0	0	0
2018	IND	2	0	4	10	2.5	5	0	1	3	3.0	3	0	**1**	**1**
2019	SEA	1	0	0	0	0.0	0	0	0	0	0.0	0	0	0	0
Total		82	4	355	1,354	3.8	26	9	85	685	8.1	34	3	3	3

==== Postseason ====
Year	Team	Games		Rushing					Receiving					Fumbles	
Year	Team	GP	GS	Att	Yds	Avg	Lng	TD	Rec	Yds	Avg	Lng	TD	Fum	Lost
2012	SEA	2	0	12	40	3.3	7	0	**3**	**43**	**14.3**	**30**	0	0	0
2013	SEA	**3**	0	**14**	40	2.9	6	0	1	9	9.0	9	0	0	0
2014	SEA	**3**	0	11	**48**	**4.4**	**19**	0	1	−2	−2.0	−2	0	0	0
2019	SEA	2	0	0	0	0.0	0	0	0	0	0.0	0	0	0	0
Total		10	0	37	128	3.5	19	0	5	50	10.0	30	0	0	0

=== FCF ===
Year	Team	Games		Rushing				Receiving				Fumbles	
Year	Team	GP	GS	Att	Yds	Avg	TD	Rec	Yds	Avg	TD	Fum	Lost
2021	FCF	2	2	9	15	1.6	3	2	72	36	0	1	1

=== College ===
Year	School	Conf	Class	Pos	G	Rushing				Receiving			
Year	School	Conf	Class	Pos	G	**Att**	**Yds**	**Avg**	**TD**	**Rec**	**Yds**	**Avg**	**TD**
2007	Utah State	WAC	FR	RB	1	3	17	5.7	0	0	0	0.0	0
2008	Utah State	WAC	FR	RB	12	106	485	4.6	8	20	256	12.8	2
2009	Utah State	WAC	SO	RB	12	207	1,296	6.3	13	30	418	13.9	5
2011	Utah State	WAC	JR	RB	13	249	1,517	6.1	19	17	171	10.1	4
**Career**	**Utah State**				**38**	**565**	**3,315**	**5.9**	**40**	**67**	**845**	**12.6**	**11**

== Community involvement and philanthropy ==
Turbin founded the Robert Turbin Football Academy, an annual football camp at his alma mater, Utah State, to help youth develop their athletic skills.

He also sponsors an annual charity basketball game in his hometown to help support his foundation, Runnin4U, which funds research and public awareness of cerebral palsy and multiple sclerosis. Turbin founded the Runnin4U Foundation as a philanthropy initiative in 2015 in partnership with the Seattle Foundation.
