= John Anton =

John Anton is the name of:

- John Anton (cricketer) (1926–2021), English cricketer
- John Anton (soccer) (born 1955), American retired soccer forward
- John P. Anton (1920–2014), professor of Greek philosophy and culture at the University of South Florida
