= Cal Stevenson =

American baseball player (born 1996)

San Diego Padres
- Outfielder
- Born: September 12, 1996 (age 30); Fremont, California, U.S.
- Bats: Left Throws: Left

MLB debut
- August 10, 2022, for the Oakland Athletics

MLB statistics (through 2025 season)
- Batting average: .178
- Home runs: 0
- Runs batted in: 8
- Stats at Baseball Reference

Teams
- Oakland Athletics (2022); San Francisco Giants (2023); Philadelphia Phillies (2024–2025)

Cal Stevenson (born September 12, 1996) is an American professional baseball outfielder in the San Diego Padres organization. He has previously played in Major League Baseball (MLB) for the Oakland Athletics, San Francisco Giants, and Philadelphia Phillies. Stevenson played college baseball for the University of Nevada, Reno Wolfpack (with whom he was named the 2015 Mountain West Co-Freshman of the Year), Chabot Junior College, and the University of Arizona. The Toronto Blue Jays selected Stevenson in the 10th round of the 2018 MLB draft.

== High school and college ==
Stevenson was born in Fremont, California to Jim and Tanya Stevenson, attended and played baseball under his father who was head coach at John F. Kennedy High School in Fremont. He was named all-Mission Valley Athletic League (MVAL) as an outfielder in 2012 and 2013, and as a utility player in 2014 when he also won the MVAL Player of the Year Award. Over the summer he played for the PUF Capitalists in the California Collegiate League (CLL), led the league in batting average, was named first team All-CLL, and was named Nevada's 2014 summer position player of the year.

In 2014, he attended the University of Nevada, Reno, where he played college baseball for the Nevada Wolf Pack. He batted .358(4th in the Mountain West Conference)/.429/.454 in 218 at bats, with 55 runs (4th), 4 triples (2nd), 0 home runs, 25 RBIs, and 10 steals (6th) in 13 attempts. He was named the 2015 Mountain West Co-Freshman of the Year, and a Freshman All-American by Louisville Slugger and Baseball America. In the summer of 2015, he played for the Duluth Huskies in the Northwoods League, batting .326/.481(leading the league)/.393 in 178 at bats, with 4 triples (4th), one home runs, 41 RBIs, 53 walks (2nd), and 16 stolen bases in 21 attempts.

He transferred to Chabot Junior College in 2015, where he was First-Team CCCAA in 2016 after batting .287/.432/.377 in 167 at bats with 57 runs (leading the league), five triples (4th), no home runs, 26 RBIs, 40 walks (2nd), and 21 stolen bases (6th) in 25 attempts. That summer he played collegiate summer baseball with the Cotuit Kettleers of the Cape Cod Baseball League, with whom he batted .254/.364/.263 in 118 at bats, with 21 walks (6th in the league), and 10 steals (8th) in 13 attempts.

He then transferred to the University of Arizona, where he was honorable mention All-Pac-12 in 2017, after batting .311/.448(4th in the conference)/.461 in 193 at bats, leading the conference with 61 runs and 48 walks, and stealing five bases without being caught. In 2018 with Arizona he batted .293/.416/.397 in 174 at bats with one home run, 26 RBIs, and 35 walks (9th in the conference) and six sacrifice flies (leading the conference). In college he played 101 games in center field, 56 games in right field, four games in left field, and pitched in three games.

== Professional career ==
=== Toronto Blue Jays ===
The Toronto Blue Jays selected Stevenson in the 10th round of the 2018 MLB draft, and he signed for a signing bonus of $5,000. Stevenson split his debut 2018 campaign between two teams, playing briefly for the rookie-level Gulf Coast Blue Jays, with whom he batted .474/.645/.579 in 19 at bats. And playing the bulk of the season for the Bluefield Blue Jays, with whom he was named an Appalachian League Post-Season All Star, hit .359(4th in the Appalachian League)/.494(2nd)/.518 in 195 at bats, and led the league with 65 runs and 53 walks, with 13 doubles (7th), 6 triples (3rd), 2 home runs, 29 RBIs, with 20 stolen bases in 22 attempts. He was named an MiLB Organization All Star.

He began the 2019 season with the High-A Dunedin Blue Jays. With them he batted .298(8th in the league)/.388(8th)/.393 in 336 at bats with 59 runs(9th), 4 triples (9th), 5 home runs, 50 RBIs, 50 walks (8th), and 11 stolen bases in 90 games, and was named a Florida State League Post-Season All Star.

=== Houston Astros ===
On July 31, 2019, the Blue Jays traded Stevenson and pitchers Aaron Sanchez and Joe Biagini to the Houston Astros for outfielder Derek Fisher. He played in 23 games for the High-A Fayetteville Woodpeckers down the stretch, posting a slash of .247/.390/.346 in 81 at bats with 18 runs, no home runs, 9 RBIs, and 19 walks.

=== Tampa Bay Rays ===
On January 9, 2020, the Astros traded Stevenson and pitcher Peyton Battenfield to the Tampa Bay Rays for pitcher Austin Pruitt. Stevenson did not play in a game in 2020 due to the cancellation of the minor league season because of the COVID-19 pandemic.

Stevenson spent the 2021 season with the Double-A Montgomery Biscuits. He slashed .254/.368/.403 in 295 at bats with 9 home runs, 41 RBIs, and 17 stolen bases (7th in the Double-A South) in 94 games.

He began the 2022 season with the Triple-A Durham Bulls. He played in 57 games and hit .265/.376/.353 in 170 at bats with 29 runs, 2 home runs, 17 RBIs, and 9 stolen bases in 11 attempts.

=== Oakland Athletics ===
On July 9, 2022, the Rays traded Stevenson and Christian Fernandez to the Oakland Athletics for Christian Bethancourt. He was assigned to the Triple-A Las Vegas Aviators upon being acquired, with whom he batted .322/.414/.529 in 87 at bats, with 23 runs, 4 home runs, 19 RBIs, 14 walks, and 7 steals in 8 attempts.

The Athletics promoted Stevenson to the major leagues for the first time on August 10. He recorded his first career hit that night, an infield single off of Los Angeles Angels reliever Aaron Loup. He played in 23 games for Oakland, hitting .167/.261/.217 in 60 at bats with 5 runs, no home runs, 1 RBI, 8 walks, and 1 stolen base.

He began the 2023 season with the Triple-A Las Vegas Aviators, hitting .348/.483/.435 in 23 at bats with 7 runs, 2 RBIs and 3 stolen bases without being caught in 7 games. On April 14, 2023, he was designated for assignment after Tyler Wade’s contract was selected.

In the minor leagues to this point in his career, on defense he had played 186 games in center field, 128 games in left field, and 28 games in right field. On offense he had hit .294/.409/.420 in 1,471 plate appearances with 260 runs, more walks (240) than strikeouts (222), and 70 steals in 88 attempts.

=== San Francisco Giants ===
On April 19, 2023, Stevenson was traded to the San Francisco Giants in exchange for cash considerations, and was optioned to the Triple-A Sacramento River Cats. Stevenson played in 6 games for San Francisco, going hitless in 9 at-bats while walking 3 times. On May 19, Stevenson was designated for assignment following the promotions of Patrick Bailey and Ryan Walker.

=== Philadelphia Phillies ===
On May 26, 2023, Stevenson was claimed off waivers by the Philadelphia Phillies. Stevenson went hitless in two games for the Triple-A Lehigh Valley IronPigs before he was designated for assignment on June 1. He cleared waivers and was sent outright to Triple–A on June 7.

Stevenson began 2024 with Triple–A Lehigh Valley, slashing .307/.420/.488 with seven home runs, 39 RBI, and 27 stolen bases over 91 games. On August 9, 2024, Stevenson had his contract selected to the active roster to replace an injured Austin Hays. On September 14, in a game against the New York Mets, Stevenson hit a go-ahead two-run double in the seventh inning and made a spectacular leaping catch to rob a home run in the eighth as the Phillies registered a 6-4 win. In 18 appearances for the Phillies, he batted .250/.333/.375 with 6 RBI and 3 walks.

Stevenson was optioned to Triple-A Lehigh Valley to begin the 2025 season. In five appearances for Philadelphia, he went 2-for-8 (.250) with one RBI. Stevenson was released by the Phillies on August 17, 2025.

Following the 2025 season, Stevenson announced that he would play in the winter league baseball for the Tigres del Licey of the Dominican Professional Baseball League.

=== Detroit Tigers ===
On January 29, 2026, Stevenson signed with the Toros de Tijuana of the Mexican League. However on February 11, Stevenson signed a minor league contract with the Detroit Tigers. In 92 games with Triple-A Toledo Mud Hens he batted .264/.410/.456 with 9 home runs, 33 RBIs and 7 stolen bases. He elected free agency on November 2.

=== San Diego Padres ===
On November 17, 2026, Stevenson signed a minor league contract with the San Diego Padres.
