= Miles Turpin =

American football player (born 1964)

No. 53, 51
- Position: Linebacker

Personal information
- Born: May 15, 1964 (age 62); Minneapolis, Minnesota, U.S.
- Listed height: 6 ft 4 in (1.93 m)
- Listed weight: 230 lb (104 kg)

Career information
- High school: American (Fremont, California)
- College: California (1982–1985)
- NFL draft: 1986: undrafted

Career history
- Green Bay Packers (1986); Cleveland Browns (1987)*; Tampa Bay Buccaneers (1987–1988)
- * Offseason or practice squad member only

Career NFL statistics
- Sacks: 2
- Stats at Pro Football Reference

Miles John Turpin (born May 15, 1964) is an American former professional football player who was a linebacker for two seasons in the National Football League (NFL) with the Green Bay Packers and Tampa Bay Buccaneers. He played college football for the California Golden Bears and was also a member of the Cleveland Browns.

== Early life ==
Turpin was born on May 15, 1964, in Minneapolis, Minnesota. His father, John, was a member of the Minnesota Vikings when Turpin was born. As a child, he moved to New York, then to Richmond, California and later Fremont. He recalled that when young, he and his brother once wrestled alligators. He said that he knew someone who ran a bar and "collected exotic creatures as a hobby": "He had these alligators – not gigantic, long ones, but good-sized ones – and me and my brother, Anthony, put a muzzle on them and started wrestling with them ... It was a lot of fun."

Turpin attended American High School in Fremont where he played football and basketball. In basketball, he was a three-year starter and served as team captain as a senior, being named All-Mission Valley Athletic League (MVAL) and to the MVAL all-tournament team after averaging 10 points and 10 rebounds per game. In football, he was also an All-MVAL selection. He signed to play college football for the California Golden Bears.

Turpin enrolled at the University of California, Berkeley, in 1982, playing for the Golden Bears under coach Joe Kapp, whom Turpin's father had been teammates with as a player in the 1960s. He made the varsity team as a freshman, being part of a group known as the "Dirty Dozen" – 12 freshmen who survived Kapp's two-a-days practices to make the team. He ended up winning varsity letters in all four years he played at California – from 1982 to 1985. At California, he was used as a linebacker and defensive end, describing his role as a "jack of all trades".

== Professional career ==
After going unselected in the 1986 NFL draft, Turpin signed with the Green Bay Packers as an undrafted free agent. He was one of 11 linebackers competing for a roster spot and ended up making the team, being, along with Bill Cherry, one of only two rookie free agents to be on the final roster. He made his NFL debut in Week 1, a 31–3 loss to the Houston Oilers, but was then released on September 9, 1986.

After the 1986 season, Turpin signed with the Cleveland Browns on April 22, 1987, but was released on September 1, 1987. After being released by the Browns, he worked as an airport shuttle bus driver and did "paralegal stuff". When the NFL players went on strike during the season, teams signed replacement players, and Turpin was signed by the Tampa Bay Buccaneers as a replacement. He appeared in all three strike games, the last two as a starter, with the Buccaneers compiling a record of 2–1 in those games. In his last game, he totaled nine tackles, two sacks and a forced fumble. He was released at the end of the strike, having totaled 16 tackles, two sacks and a pass deflection during his stint with the Buccaneers. He later re-signed with the Buccaneers for the 1988 season, but was released on July 25, 1988, ending his professional career.
