= Joshua Chadbourne =

Joshua Francis Chadbourne (April 30, 1873 – December 5, 1959) was born in Centerville (Alameda County), California and died in Fremont, California. He was a businessman who opened the first auto mechanic shop between Hayward, California and San Jose, California in Irvington, California. He also owned a large apricot orchard in Irvington. Chadbourne Elementary School (an elementary school in the Fremont Unified School District) was named after him, as the benefactor of the land for the school.
