= Irvington High School (Fremont, California) =

Public high school in California, United States

Location
- 41800 Blacow Road; Fremont, California 94538; United States; 37°31′23.16″N 121°58′2.79″W

Information
- Type: Public high school
- Established: 1961
- School district: Fremont Unified School District
- CEEB code: 050968
- Principal: Stan Hicks
- Teaching staff: 85.91 (FTE)
- Grades: 9–12
- Enrollment: 2,157 (2024-2025)
- Student to teacher ratio: 25.11
- Colors: Royal Blue and White
- Mascot: Viking
- Newspaper: The Voice
- Yearbook: The Saga
- Website: fremontunified.org/irvington/

Irvington High School is an American public secondary school located in the Irvington district of Fremont, California, United States. It is one of the five public high schools in the Fremont Unified School District. Since 2012, Irvington has received full accreditation from the Western Association of Schools and Colleges Irvington was named a California Distinguished School in both 2024 and 2025. It is a moderately sized high school, and enrollment for 2023-2024 had 2,156 students with 92 faculty.

== Campus ==
The 47-acre (190,000 m^{2}) campus is located in the Irvington district. When it opened in 1961, it underwent major construction in 1968, resulting in the addition of a 150-seat theater, a second gymnasium, and ten and a half classrooms. Irvington underwent further campus beautification in 2009, with the installation of the prototypical solar panel on the southwest corner and re-sodding of the varsity and JV baseball fields. In the summer of 2010, further improvements were made to the main parking lot on the east side of campus. A two-story building was added in 2016 for math and science classes.

== Academics ==
Irvington is a National Blue Ribbon School and California Distinguished School. In April 2024 U.S. News & World Report ranked Irvington as 44th in California, 337th in the United States, and 84th in the United States for STEM (Science, Technology, Engineering, and Mathematics). 86% of Irvington students take at least one Advanced Placement (AP) exam, and 66% score a passing score of 3 or above. As of 2024, Irvington has had a 95% completion rate for ELA and mathematics, as well as achieving Blue status on the California Dashboard in both English Language Arts and Mathematics.

=== Awards ===
- Ladies' Home Journal Ten Most Amazing Schools in the United States
- Civic Learning Award of Excellence

== Demographics ==
Student Demographics (2021–22)
Asian	White	Hispanic	African American	Pacific Islander	American Indian
77.87%	7.53%	10.93%	0.95%	0.30%	0.22%

According to U.S. News & World Report, 84% of Irvington's student body is "of color," with 13% of the student body coming from economically disadvantaged households, determined by student eligibility for California's reduced-price meal program. 5.23% of Irvington's students are English Language Learners.

Student Demographics (2023-24)
Asian	Hispanic	White	Two or more races	African American	Pacific Islander
78.9%	11.4%	6.0%	2.0%	1.0%	.001%

As of 2024, Irvington's free and reduced lunch program has been expanded so that all students are eligible.

== Extracurricular ==
=== Athletics ===
Irvington High School is a member of the Mission Valley Athletic League (MVAL), which includes high schools in Fremont as well as Newark Memorial High School in Newark, James Logan High School in Union City, and Moreau Catholic High School in Hayward. The league competes within the North Coast Section of the California Interscholastic Federation.

Fall sports	Winter sports	Spring sports
Cheerleading	Basketball	Baseball
Cross country	Soccer	Softball
Wrestling	Gymnastics	
Water polo (men, women)		
Volleyball (women)		Volleyball (men)
Tennis (women)		Swim and dive
Golf (women)		Tennis (men)
Flag football (women)		Golf (men)
Badminton		Track and field
		Beach volleyball
Volleyball (Frosh/Soph) (women)

== Band ==
Irvington High School has six concert band groups: a freshman symphonic band, two symphonic bands, an orchestra, and two wind ensembles. It also offers a jazz ensemble and several independent ensembles. The wind ensembles have received Unanimous Superior ratings at CMEA competitions and regularly send members to California's All-State and Northern California's All-Northern Honor Bands.

The marching band grew from 186 members in 2013–2014 to nearly 250 members in 2014–2015. The color guard placed first in Division AA in 2015, and the drum major earned second place in the Mace category. In 2011, the band achieved its highest results at the Lincoln Tournament of Champions. In 2012, the band won sweepstakes at the Feste Del Mar Band Review and the Tournament of Champions at Lincoln High School. The marching band is divided into JV and varsity, with auditions required for varsity. In 2017, the varsity band won music and overall sweepstakes at the Lincoln Band Review. In 2022, the JV band won 1st place in Division 6A at the Lincoln Tournament of Champions, while the varsity band finished the season undefeated, winning multiple sweepstakes awards.

=== Robotics ===
The Irvington High School Robotics Club started in February 2010 and competed in its first event, the 2010 Northern California Botball Tournament, held in San Mateo winning first place in the Alliance Competition and receiving a plaque for Outstanding Documentation. By fall 2010, the club expanded from one team to three. In fall 2016, the club formed two VEX teams: a regular and a 'varsity' team using Project Lead the Way's engineering courses. In February 2018, the club hosted its first VEX Robotics Competition qualifier.

== Notable alumni ==
- PJ Hirabayashi, musician
- Dick Ruthven, former Major League Baseball player
- Alberto Torrico, politician
- Kupono Low, professional soccer player
- Noah Delgado, professional soccer player
- Robert Turbin, NFL running back
- Mark Mathias, Major League Baseball player
- Sean Wang, film director Academy Award for Best Documentary Short Film (Nǎi Nai & Wài Pó) nominee
- Izye, trap-pop and R&B singer-songwriter
