= Terry Alderete =

American businesswoman (1945–2013)

- Alderete on the board of the Hispanic Community Affairs Council
- Born: May 17, 1945; San Jose, CA
- Died: March 21, 2013 (aged 67); Newark, CA
- Education: San Jose State University

Theresa Eleanor "Terry" Roderick-Alderete (May 17, 1945 in San Jose, California – March 21, 2013 in Newark, California) was an American businesswoman from the Bay Area. After working for Pacific Bell for thirty years, she started her own consulting business which organizes events for Bay Area non-profits. She was inaugurated into the Alameda County Women's Hall of Fame in 2012.

== Personal life and education ==
Terry Alderete was born in the Bay Area. Her mother and aunt were migrants from Jalisco, Mexico. They came to the United States in 1922 and her mother started ironing clothes in Los Angeles, California. Her father migrated, in 1910, from Cebu, Philippines. Her parents met and moved to Newark, California, and worked as migrant workers. After saving enough money, they started their own strawberry farm. Her father died when Alderete was four.

Alderete graduated from Newark High School with honors. After high school, she attended San Jose State University. She intended on studying medicine, but, received her B.S. degree in recreation. Terry had two children and lived in Newark, California.

== Professional career ==
After graduating from San Jose State University, Alderete started working at Pacific Bell. She worked there for twenty-nine years. She started as a phone operator and left the company as Ethnic Marketing Director. Alderete started working for the Unity Council in Oakland. After retiring, she started her own consulting business, Alderete Business Visions, in 1998. The company organizes events for Bay Area Hispanic non-profits such as the Dia de los Muertos in Oakland, the Carnaval in San Francisco, and the Mariachi Festival in San Jose.

== Volunteerism ==
Alderete has served as Director of the California Hispanics Chamber of Commerce and has been active in the organization since 1988. She is the former President of the Hispanic Chamber of Commerce of Alameda County. Terry was also the Director of the Newark Rotary and was also involved in the Ohlone College Foundation, the Fremont Symphony Orchestra, and the San Francisco Foundation awards.

== Notable awards ==
- Congressional Recognition Award, Congresswoman Barbara Lee
- Hispanic Heritage Hero Award, Oakland Raiders
- Maria Arias Memorial Business Fund Award, 2005, Latina Style Magazine and Wells Fargo Bank
- Telemundo T48 Business Salute Award, Telemundo
- Woman of the Year, Senator Liz Figueroa
- Inductee, 2012, Alameda County Women's Hall of Fame

== Death ==
She died on 21 March 2013 in Newark of cardiac arrest.
