= Mission San Jose High School =

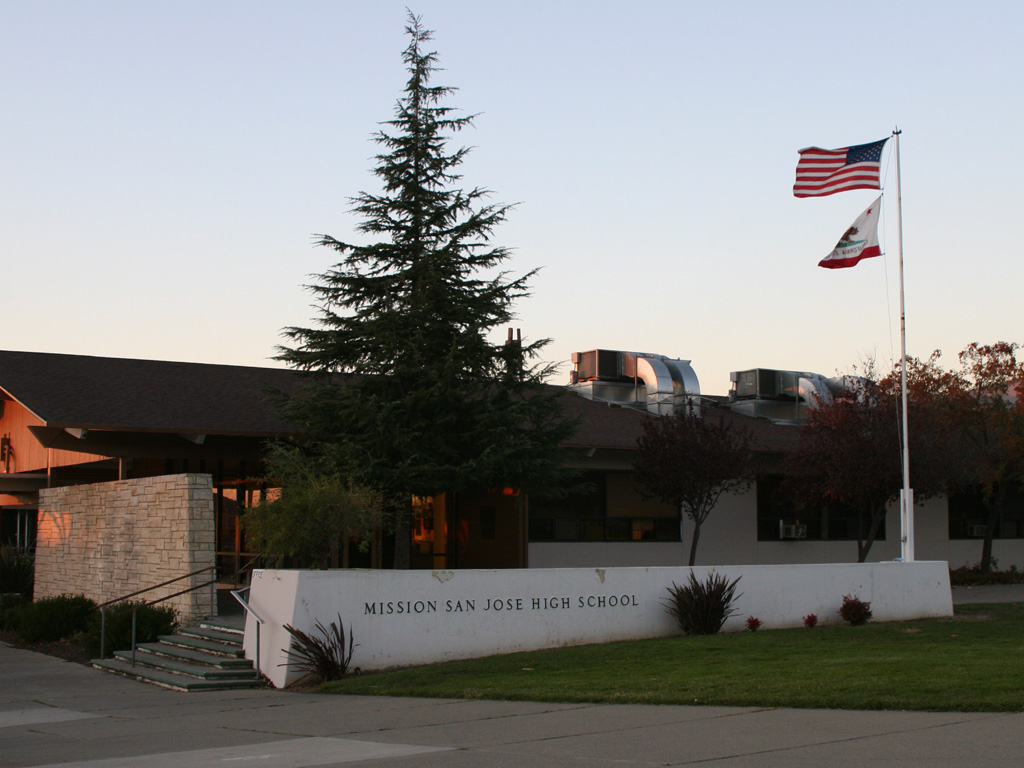

Location
- 41717 Palm Ave. Fremont, California 94539; United States; 37.5447°N 121.9338°W

Information
- Type: Public high school
- Opened: 1964
- School district: Fremont Unified School District
- CEEB code: 050970
- Principal: Amy Perez
- Teaching staff: 72.40 ((on an FTE basis))
- Grades: 9–12
- Enrollment: 1,794 (2023–24)
- Student to teacher ratio: 24.78
- Campus type: Suburban
- Colors: Green, black, and white
- Nickname: Warriors
- Accreditation: Blue Ribbon
- USNWR ranking: 98th (2026)
- Newspaper: The Smoke Signal
- Yearbook: The Summit
- Feeder schools: Hopkins Junior High School
- Website: fremontunified.org/msjhs/

Mission San Jose High School (MSJHS or MSJ) is a four-year co-educational public high school founded in 1964. It is located in the Mission San Jose district of Fremont, California, United States. It is one of five comprehensive high schools in the Fremont Unified School District (FUSD). Mission San Jose High School is the third largest high school in Fremont. It was named after Mission San José de Guadalupe, the 1797 Spanish church founded nearby. MSJHS has gained a reputation for being highly competitive and academically driven, and many students participate in programmes like DECA, Science Olympiad, robotics, and Debate outside of academics. Many students gain admission into top-tier universities, and MSJHS is considered a feeder school into UC Berkeley.

== School structure ==
In 2025, U.S. News & World Report ranked Mission San Jose High as the 107th best high school in the United States. The school was ranked 12th in California, with an Advanced Placement participation rate of 88% and an average SAT score of 1410.

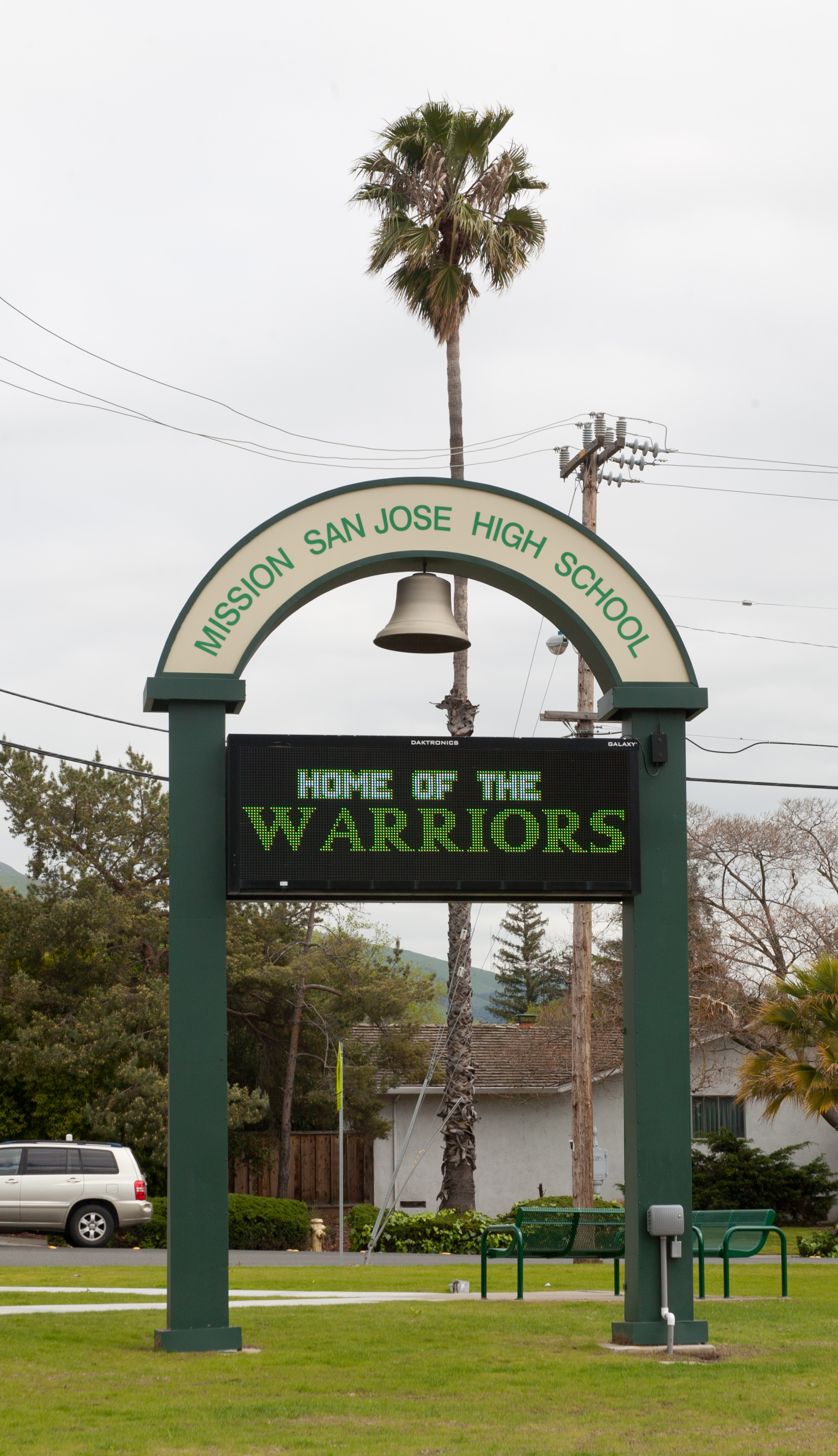
The marquee in front of Mission San Jose High School

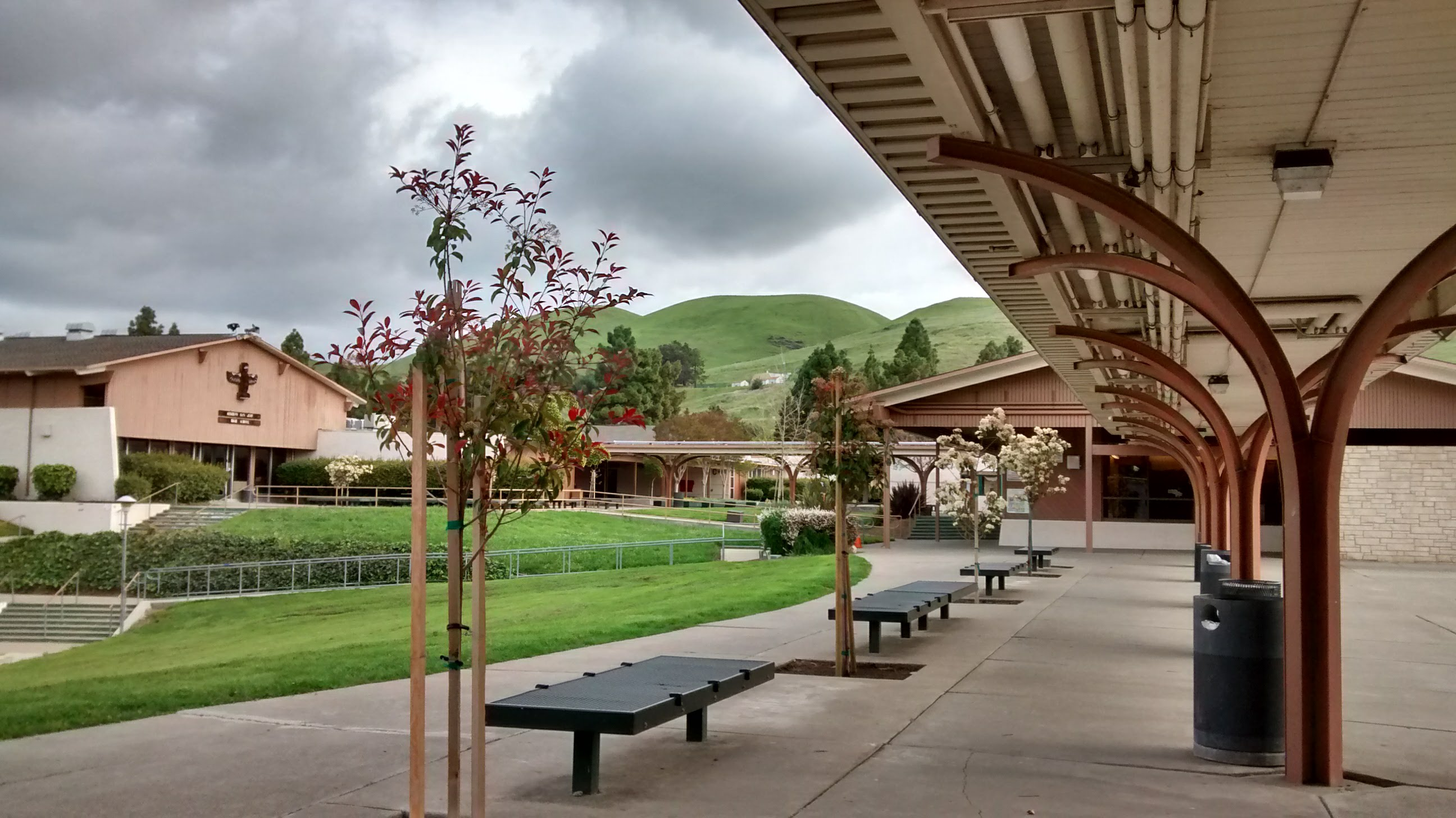
Mission San Jose High front entrance with the library building on the left and office on the right

The school was named a National Blue Ribbon School in 1987, 1996, and 2008.

=== Demographics ===
As of the 2024–25 school year, 88.7% of the students were Asian American, 3.3% were White, 4.3% were Hispanic and 0.5% were African American. According to California School Dashboard, in 2024 MSJHS had 18.2% socioeconomically disadvantaged students and 4.4% English Learners out of its total population of 1,794.

== Extracurricular activities ==
=== Academic competitions ===
==== Quiz bowl-style tournaments ====
In 2008, Mission San Jose's National Ocean Science Bowl Team placed first at the regional competition, advancing to the National Competition and placing second behind Lincoln-Sudbury Regional High School. In 2026, Mission San Jose's National Science Bowl team placed first at the national competition, winning $5,000 for the school's science department.

==== Speech and debate ====
In 2004–2005, Mission San Jose's Lincoln-Douglas Debate team (also known as OHSODEF) was ranked first in the country. The team won the National Tournament of Champions in 2003 and closed out (having two debaters meet in the final round of) the 2004 Fall Classic tournament at the Greenhill School. In 2018, the team won the National Speech and Debate Association national championship in Public forum debate.

==== Go tournaments ====
Mission San Jose's Go team took first place at the California High School Go Championships three years in a row (2005–2007). In 2008, the MSJ Go club won first place in the Open Division to become the national champions. In 2010, Mission won first place in Division A at the newly formed Bay Area High School Go Tournament.

==== Chess tournaments ====
In 2005, the team tied for first place at the CalNorthYouthChess regionals. In 2000, the team took first at the State Scholastic Championship.

=== Athletics ===
Mission San Jose High School is a member of the Mission Valley Athletic League (MVAL), which includes high schools in Fremont as well as Newark Memorial High School in Newark, James Logan High School in Union City, and Moreau Catholic High School in Hayward. The league competes within the North Coast Section of the California Interscholastic Federation.

During the 1978 football season, the Mission San Jose football team won the North Coast Section 4A Varsity Football Championship and completed an undefeated 12–0 season, becoming the first team in MVAL history to win an NCS football title. The football program was discontinued following the 2015 season.

Mission San Jose High School's winter guard program has a first-place finish in the Intermediate Division at the 2011 Northern California Band Association Winter Guard Championships.

The school's colors are green and white, and its teams are known as the Warriors. The school previously used imagery associated with Mission Peak and a feathered arrow logo; these designs were phased out in the late 1990s due to concerns regarding the use of Native American imagery in school mascots. Currently, the school designates the "Mission Man" as a mascot.

== Notable alumni ==
- Johnny Abrego (Class of 1981), former Major League Baseball pitcher
- Consuelo Maria Callahan (Class of 1968), Ninth Circuit Appeals Court Judge
- Natali Del Conte (Class of 1996), host of CNET's Loaded
- Dina Ruiz-Eastwood (Class of 1983), television personality and ex-wife of Clint Eastwood
- Ryan Edwards (Class of 1994), former professional soccer player
- Scott Fisher (Class of 1981), former National Basketball League MVP player and coach, Australian Olympian
- Mic Gillette (Class of 1969), musician and former trumpeter for Tower of Power
- Pragathi Guruprasad (Class of 2016), playback singer and model, attended for 2 years
- Don Hertzfeldt (Class of 1994), Academy Award-nominated animator
- Lev Kirshner (Class of 1987), soccer player and San Diego State University men's soccer coach
- Joe Krakoski (Class of 1981), former NFL linebacker
- Joe Lonsdale (Class of 2000), founder of Palantir
- Scot Marciel (Class of 1976), diplomat and current United States Ambassador to Burma (Myanmar)
- Joseph McVein (Class of 1974), former handball player; competed in the 1984 Summer Olympics and 1988 Summer Olympics
- Justin Medlock (Class of 2002), placekicker, Carolina Panthers
- Sammy Obeid (Class of 2002), writer and stand-up comedian
- Jason Oppenheim (Class of 1995), founder of The Oppenheim Group and cast member in Selling Sunset
- Gary Plummer (Class of 1978), former NFL linebacker
- Kevin Sakuda (Class of 1998), former soccer defender/midfielder
- Sid Sriram (Class of 2008), playback singer in Indian films
- Kevin Tan (Class of 2000), 2008 Beijing Olympics bronze medalist for men's team gymnastics
- Kristi Yamaguchi (Class of 1989), Olympic figure skating gold medalist; champion of Dancing with the Stars season 6
