= Darryl Byrd =

American football player (born 1960)

No. 54, 50
- Position: Linebacker

Personal information
- Born: September 3, 1960 (age 66); San Diego, California, U.S.
- Listed height: 6 ft 1 in (1.85 m)
- Listed weight: 220 lb (100 kg)

Career information
- High school: James Logan (Union City, California)
- College: Illinois (1979–1982)
- NFL draft: 1983: undrafted

Career history
- Los Angeles Raiders (1983–1984); San Francisco 49ers (1986)*; Los Angeles Raiders (1987)
- * Offseason or practice squad member only

Awards and highlights
- Super Bowl champion (XVIII)
- Stats at Pro Football Reference

Darryl Terrence Byrd (born September 3, 1960) is an American former professional football linebacker who played three seasons with the Los Angeles Raiders of the National Football League (NFL). He played college football at the University of Illinois at Urbana–Champaign. He was a member of the Raiders team that won Super Bowl XVIII.

== Early life and college ==
Darryl Terrence Byrd was born on September 3, 1960, in San Diego, California. He attended James Logan High School in Union City, California.

He was a member of the Illinois Fighting Illini football team from 1979 to 1982 and a two-year letterman from 1981 to 1982. He recorded one interception in 1982.

== Professional career ==
After going undrafted in the 1983 NFL draft, Byrd signed with the Los Angeles Raiders on April 30, 1983. He was waived on August 29 but re-signed the next day. He played in all 16 games for the Raiders during his rookie season in 1983. He also played in three playoff games that year, including the victory over the Washington Redskins in Super Bowl XVIII. Byrd appeared in all 16 games for the second consecutive season, starting one, in 1984. He was released by the Raiders on August 20, 1985, re-signed on August 23, and released again on August 27, 1985.

Byrd was signed by the San Francisco 49ers on May 14, 1986. He was released on August 19, 1986.

Byrd signed with the Raiders again in 1987 before being released on September 1, 1987. He was re-signed by the Raiders on September 23, during the 1987 NFL players strike. He played in three games, starting two, that season. He was released on October 19, 1987, after the strike ended.
