= Lyle West =

American football player (born 1976)

No. 37, 30
- Position: Safety

Personal information
- Born: December 20, 1976 (age 49); Columbus, Georgia, U.S.

Career information
- High school: Washington (Fremont, California)
- College: San Jose State
- NFL draft: 1999: 6th round, 189th overall pick

Career history
- New York Giants (1999–2000); Kansas City Chiefs (2001)*; (2002–2003)
- * Offseason or practice squad member only

Career NFL statistics
- Games played - started: 51 - 2
- Tackles: 14
- Fumble recoveries: 1
- Stats at Pro Football Reference

Benjamin Lyle West (born December 20, 1976) is an American former professional football player who was a safety in the National Football League (NFL). He played college football for the San Jose State Spartans and was selected 189th overall by the New York Giants in the sixth round of the 1999 NFL draft. He played four seasons for the Giants (1999–2000) and the Kansas City Chiefs (2002–2003)

West played for the Huskies at Washington High School, graduating in 1995. He went on to play at Chabot College and San Jose State University.

Since 2004, he has been working as a realtor in the Greater Sacramento Area.
