= Nikko Reed =

American football player (born 2003)

No. 35 – New York Giants
- Position: Cornerback
- Roster status: Practice squad

Personal information
- Born: March 3, 2003 (age 23); Oakland, California, U.S.
- Listed height: 5 ft 10 in (1.78 m)
- Listed weight: 180 lb (82 kg)

Career information
- High school: Moreau Catholic (Hayward, California)
- College: Colorado (2021–2022); Oregon (2023–2024)
- NFL draft: 2025: undrafted

Career history
- Los Angeles Chargers (2025–2026); New York Giants (2026–present)

Career NFL statistics as of Week 10, 2026
- Total tackles: 3
- Pass deflections: 1
- Stats at Pro Football Reference

Nikko Reed (born March 3, 2003) is an American professional football cornerback for the New York Giants of the National Football League (NFL). He played college football for the Colorado Buffaloes and Oregon Ducks.

== Early life ==
Reed attended Moreau Catholic High School in Hayward, California. Coming out of high school, he was rated as a three star recruit, where he committed to play college football for the Colorado Buffaloes.

== College career ==
=== Colorado ===
As a freshman in 2021, Reed played in 12 games, notching eight tackles and an interception. In 2022, he started in all 12 games, totaling 42 tackles with one and a half being for a loss, a sack, seven pass deflections, and two interceptions, while also returning 19 kickoffs with an average of 22.6 yards per return. After the season, he entered his name into the NCAA transfer portal.

=== Oregon ===
Reed transferred to play for the Oregon Ducks. During his time at Oregon, he served occasionally as one of the team's starting cornerbacks, totaling 64 tackles, a sack, 13 pass deflections, and two interceptions. After the conclusion of the 2024 season, he decided to enter his name into the 2025 NFL draft.

== Professional career ==
Pre-draft measurables
Height	Weight	Arm length	Hand span	Wingspan	40-yard dash	10-yard split	20-yard split	20-yard shuttle	Three-cone drill	Vertical jump	Broad jump
5 ft 9 1/4 in (1.76 m)	183 lb (83 kg)	30 1/8 in (0.77 m)	9 in (0.23 m)	5 ft 11 3/4 in (1.82 m)	4.46 s	1.58 s	2.62 s	4.41 s	6.95 s	32.0 in (0.81 m)	9 ft 8 in (2.95 m)
All values from Pro Day

=== Los Angeles Chargers ===
After not being selected in the 2025 NFL draft, Reed signed with the Los Angeles Chargers as an undrafted free agent. In his preseason debut in the 2025 NFL Hall of Fame Game, he notched a 60-yard interception and two pass deflections. On August 26, 2025, the Chargers announced that Reed had been added to their 53-man roster. He made five appearances for Los Angeles, recording two combined tackles. On January 3, 2026, Reed was placed on injured reserve due to a hamstring injury.

On August 30, 2026, Reed was waived by the Chargers as a part of final roster cuts; he was re-signed to the team's practice squad the following day.

=== New York Giants ===
On September 17, 2026, the New York Giants signed Reed off of the Chargers' practice squad. On November 16, Reed was waived and re-signed to the practice squad two days later.
