= Tuineau Alipate =

Tongan gridiron football player (1967–2021)

No. 91, 51, 53
- Position: Linebacker

Personal information
- Born: August 21, 1967; Tonga
- Died: October 15, 2021 (aged 54); Bloomington, Minnesota, U.S.
- Listed height: 6 ft 1 in (1.85 m)
- Listed weight: 245 lb (111 kg)

Career information
- High school: James Logan (Union City, California, U.S.)
- College: Washington State

Career history
- Saskatchewan Roughriders (1989–1991); Hamilton Tiger-Cats (1991); Saskatchewan Roughriders (1992)*; Los Angeles Raiders (1993)*; New York Jets (1993–1994); Green Bay Packers (1994)*; Minnesota Vikings (1995)
- * Offseason or practice squad member only

Awards and highlights
- Grey Cup champion (1989)
- Stats at Pro Football Reference

Tuineau A. Alipate (/tuːˈnaʊ ˌælɪˈpɑːteɪ/; August 21, 1967 – October 15, 2021) was a Tongan gridiron football player who was a linebacker in the National Football League (NFL) and Canadian Football League (CFL). After playing college football at Washington State University, Alipate played for the Saskatchewan Roughriders and Hamilton Tiger-Cats of the CFL from 1989 to 1992. In 1989, he was part of the Roughriders team that won the 77th Grey Cup. After being cut by the Roughriders, Alipate tried out for multiple NFL teams and received a practice squad position with the New York Jets. He went on to play for both the Jets and the Minnesota Vikings from 1994 to 1996, primarily on special teams. He also had a short stint with the Green Bay Packers in 1995.

== Early career ==
Alipate was born in Tonga and moved to the San Francisco Bay area when he was eight years old. He did not play football until he attended James Logan High School in Union City, California. He was inducted into the James Logan High School Athletics Hall of Fame in 2010. He played college football with the Washington State Cougars. In his senior year, he missed all but two games due to a broken thumb. Alipate returned in time for the Aloha Bowl against the Houston Cougars, where he forced a fumble on Houston's final possession to preserve a 24–22 win.

== Professional career ==
=== Canadian football ===
Alipate was signed by the Saskatchewan Roughriders in 1989 but released prior to the start of the regular season. Nevertheless, he rejoined the team and played in 17 regular season games that year. Alipate benefited from a slew of linebacker injuries, and he finished the season as one of only two linebackers on the Roughriders who avoided injury in 1989. In a Week 17 win against the Calgary Stampeders, Alipate blocked a punt on special teams and intercepted Tom Porras to be named the CFL's Defensive Player of the Week. Alipate made 31 tackles and three fumble recoveries during his rookie season and was named the Roughriders' nominee for the Rookie of the Year award. Alipate recovered a fumble during the West Division Final, setting up a touchdown drive. The Roughriders went on to upset the championship-favorite Edmonton Eskimos 32–21 to become division champions. The Roughriders won the 77th Grey Cup 43–40 against the Hamilton Tiger-Cats. In 1990, Alipate played in all 18 regular season games for the Roughriders and made 35 tackles.

The Tiger-Cats traded for Alipate in May 1991 as part of an agreement that sent quarterback Tom Worman to Saskatchewan. Due to the CFL's import ratio, Alipate was held out of games during the beginning of the season. He started in place of Pete Giftopoulos in early September but was later injured and placed on the reserve list. Alipate ended the season with 25 tackles, three sacks, and a fumble recovery over seven games. The Saskatchewan Roughriders signed Alipate for training camp in 1992, but he was released before the start of the regular season.

=== American football ===
Alipate practiced with both the Los Angeles Raiders and the New York Jets in 1993, but he failed to make the active rosters for either team. In 1994, Alipate was again among the Jets' final cuts before the start of the regular season, but he was offered a spot on the team's practice squad. The Jets frequently moved Alipate back and forth from the practice squad and the active roster throughout the season. On November 14, Alipate recovered a botched punt in a 17–10 loss to the Green Bay Packers. Alipate also forced a fumble in a November 27 game against the Miami Dolphins. He finished the season with eight games played for the Jets. When active, Alipate was used mostly on special teams. He was signed to the Green Bay Packers' practice squad in January 1995. He re-signed with the Packers on February 21 and was waived on June 12, 1995.

In July 1995, the Minnesota Vikings acquired Alipate for use on special teams. Throughout the season, Alipate was also used as a backup for multiple positions, including the middle linebacker and strongside linebacker. He played in all 16 regular season games that year, but Alipate's playing time was limited mostly to special teams. Alipate was cut from the Vikings after training camp in 1996 in favor of first-round draft pick Duane Clemons. Alipate tried out for the Vikings in 1998 but was not signed by the team.

== Personal life ==
Alipate was the nephew of Halaevalu Mataʻaho ʻAhomeʻe, former Queen Consort of Tonga. He was married to Lisa Alipate and had five sons and one daughter: Moses, Marcus, Mikias, Mariah, Maximus, and Maddox. Tuineau's oldest son Moses Alipate played college football at University of Minnesota and the National Basketball League of Tonga. Marcus Alipate played college basketball at the University of St. Thomas and currently plays for the Canterbury Rams of the National Basketball League of New Zealand. Mikias played college football at South Dakota State University.

He died on October 15, 2021.
