= John F. Kennedy High School (Fremont, California) =

Location
- 39999 Blacow Rd. Fremont, California 94538; United States; 37°31′43.99″N 121°59′11.64″W

Information
- Type: Public high school
- Established: 1965
- School district: Fremont Unified School District
- Principal: Ronaldo Fisher
- Teaching staff: 62.33 (FTE)
- Enrollment: 1,273 (2024-2025)
- Student to teacher ratio: 20.42
- Colors: Purple and gold
- Mascot: Titan
- Newspaper: The Titan Tribune jfkhstitantribune.com
- Yearbook: Legend
- Website: https://fremontunified.org/kennedy/

John F. Kennedy High School is a public high school located in Fremont, California, in the United States. It opened in the fall of 1965 with nine buildings.

== Academics ==
On March 24, 2007, a team of Kennedy students won the World Affairs Challenge held at San Francisco State University, sponsored by World Savvy.

John F. Kennedy High School is also host to Mission Valley Regional Occupational Program, or MVROP, where students and adults attend courses in career fields including culinary arts, firefighting, automotive repair, and video production.

== Athletics ==
John F. Kennedy high school a member of the Mission Valley Athletic League (MVAL), which includes high schools in Fremont as well as Newark Memorial High School in Newark, James Logan High School in Union City, and Moreau Catholic High School in Hayward. The league competes within the North Coast Section of the California Interscholastic Federation. Their mascot is the Titan, and their colors are purple and gold.

In 2014, future major league outfielder Cal Stevenson was named the MVAL Player of the Year, playing for the Kennedy High baseball team.

== Notable alumni ==
- Emilio Castillo, founding member of Tower of Power
- Dom Corleo, underground rapper
- Dominic Kinnear, former soccer player and former head coach of the San Jose Earthquakes and Houston Dynamo of US Major League Soccer
- Lamond Murray, former NBA player
- Moon Fleming, former FIBA Basketball player
- Roman René Ramírez, singer and guitarist of Sublime with Rome
- Randy Ready, former Major League Baseball player
- Cal Stevenson (born 1996), Major League Baseball outfielder for the San Francisco Giants
- Aisha Wahab, United States Rep. District 14

== See also ==
- List of memorials to John F. Kennedy
