= Averroes High School =

High school in Fremont, California, US

Coordinates: 37.5196°N 121.9458°W

Location
- 43433 Mission Blvd. #101, Fremont, CA 94539

Information
- Type: Private high school
- Motto: A College Preparatory School
- Founded: 2010
- Principal: Faheem Rivers
- Enrollment: 65
- Color: Burgundy Black
- Mascot: Falcon
- Newspaper: The Averroes Chronica
- Website: Averroes High School website

Averroes High School is a college preparatory Islamic high school (grades 9–12) in Fremont, California, founded in 2010. It is the first Islamic high school in the Bay Area.
