= Fremont Unified School District =

School district in California, United States

Address
- 4210 Technology Dr Fremont, Alameda County, California, 94538; United States

District information
- Type: Public
- Grades: K–12
- Superintendent: TBD (as of Feb 2025)
- Schools: 41

Other information
- Website: fremontunified.org

Fremont Unified School District (FUSD) is a primary and secondary education school district located in Fremont, California, United States.

It serves the entire city limits of Fremont.

The district has 29 elementary school campuses, five middle school campuses, five high school campuses, and a continuation high school and alternative school on a shared campus.

== School campuses and attendance areas ==
The district determines attendance at schools based on where an individual lives as its first priority. There are five main attendance areas: American Attendance Area, Irvington Attendance Area, Kennedy Attendance Area, Mission Attendance Area and Washington Attendance Area. All include one high school and one middle school, in addition to between four and seven elementary schools. The attendance areas are further split up into smaller areas for the elementary schools. Overcrowding in elementary schools is addressed by moving students to another elementary school in the same attendance area.

=== High schools ===
The district has five comprehensive high schools for 9th through 12th grade students. The attendance areas take their names from the five high schools. American High School serves the northern part of Fremont. Irvington High School serves the southern portion of Fremont, away from the Mission San Jose. John F. Kennedy High School serves the area between Irvington and Washington. Mission San Jose High School serves the Mission San Jose neighborhood. Washington High School serves the central area of Fremont, just below American's attendance area, and extends to the Niles area, just north of Mission San Jose.

High schools in Fremont Unified School District
School	American	Irvington	Kennedy	Mission San Jose	Washington
Location	Fremont	Fremont	Fremont	Fremont	Fremont
Year opened	1972	1961	1965	1964	1892
School colors	Red, white, and blue (navy)	Blue, White	Purple, Gold	Black, White, Green	Orange, Black
School mascot	Eagles	Vikings	Titans	Warriors	Huskies

=== Middle schools ===
There are five middle schools for 6th, 7th and 8th grade students, one for every attendance area.

- Thornton Middle School is part of the American Attendance Area.
- Horner Middle School is part of the Irvington Attendance Area.
- Walters Middle School is part of the Kennedy Attendance Area.
- Hopkins Middle School is part of the Mission Attendance Area.
- Centerville Middle School is part of the Washington Attendance Area.

All of the middle schools accept graduates of the elementary schools of their attendance area.

=== Elementary schools ===
The 29 kindergarten through grade 5 elementary schools are split among five different attendance areas based on a local high school and middle school. Although these are generally localized attendance areas, the high school or middle school that an elementary school funnels into may not necessarily be the school that is closest to the elementary school.

The elementary schools of the American Attendance Area are Ardenwood Elementary School, Brookvale Elementary School, Forest Park Elementary School, Oliveira Elementary School, Patterson Elementary School and Warwick Elementary School.

The elementary schools of the Irvington Attendance Area are Harvey Green Elementary School, Grimmer Elementary School, Hirsch Elementary School, Leitch Elementary School, Warm Springs Elementary School and Weibel Elementary School.

The elementary schools of the Kennedy Attendance Area are Azevada Elementary School, Blacow Elementary School, Brier Elementary School, Durham Elementary School, Lila Bringhurst Elementary School, Mattos Elementary School and Millard Elementary School.

The elementary schools of the Mission Attendance Area are Chadbourne Elementary School, Gomes Elementary School, Mission San Jose Elementary School and Mission Valley Elementary School.

The elementary schools of the Washington Attendance Area are Cabrillo Elementary School, Glenmoor Elementary School, Maloney Elementary School, Niles Elementary School, Parkmont Elementary School and Vallejo Mill Elementary School.

Fremont Adult School, located on Calaveras Avenue, is a popular educational institution offering a variety of adult education programs including ESL, Adult Basic Education, Community Education, Distance Learning, and ELCivics.

=== Alternative schools ===
The Fremont Unified School District Alternative Schools are a collaboration of three alternative schools within the Fremont Unified School District.

The Circle of Independent Learning is a charter school that is a resource for home school families.

Robertson High School is the alternative school for those who were not successful at their respective high schools. The program is designed to allow students the opportunity to make up academic deficiencies and provide a program to complete classes in an accelerated manner, with students earning up to 90 credits per year. Students may take additional coursework either on campus, at ROP, or adult school.

Vista Alternative is an additional campus at the facility. This school provides teacher-supervised, self-paced programs for students who are not able to physically attend a school every day.

== Board of education ==
The board of education consists of five individuals elected at large by the voters of the district. A board member's term is for four years and has no term limit. The positions of president, vice president, and clerk are rotated among the members. The board also includes one appointed student member, who is generally the Associated Student Body President of one of the five high schools.

=== Current board members ===
As of December 2024, the president of the board of education is Larry Sweeney. The vice president is Dianne Jones. The clerk is Sharon Coco. Other members of the board are Vivek Prasad and Rinu Nair.

The Student Board Member is Rishab Jaini.

=== Board meetings ===
The board usually meets every other Wednesday at the Fremont Unified School District building at 4210 Technology Drive, in Fremont.

== The office of the superintendent ==
The superintendent of the Fremont Unified School District is appointed by the board of education. The superintendent acts as the supervisor of all schools and makes many administrative decisions at schools.

=== Selection of the superintendent ===
The superintendent is selected by a vote of the board of education. Usually the public leaders around the attendance areas have a lot of input before a candidate is selected by the board. The candidate generally goes through an extensive interview process before being considered for the position.

On February 12, 2025, Erik Burmeister resigned as superintendent after serving less than a year.

== Inappropriate Relationships ==
In November 2016, officials began investigating a possible inappropriate relationship involving a teacher and a student. The teacher was later sentenced to 180 days in county jail of which she were able to serve at home, and 150 hours of community service.
