= Washington High School (Fremont, California) =

Public high school in the United States

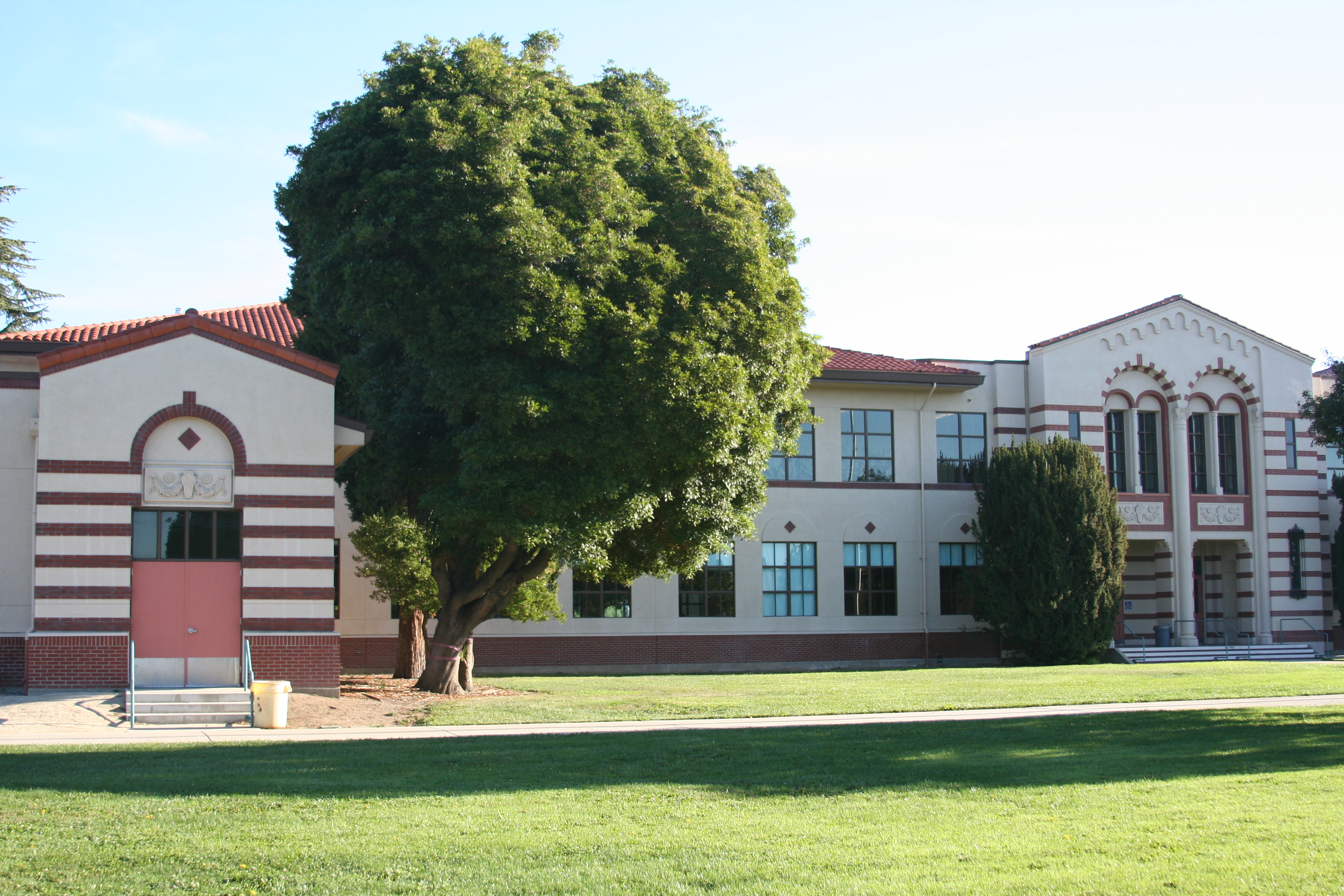

Location
- 38442 Fremont Boulevard; Fremont, California 94536; United States

Information
- Type: Public high school
- Motto: "Educate, Challenge, and Inspire"
- Established: August 25, 1891
- School district: Fremont Unified School District
- CEEB code: 050972
- Principal: Bob Moran
- Teaching staff: 76.08 (FTE)
- Grades: 9–12
- Enrollment: 1,901 (2023–2024)
- Student to teacher ratio: 24.99
- Campus size: 20 acres (8.1 ha)
- Campus type: Suburban
- Colors: Orange and black
- Nickname: Huskies
- Newspaper: The Hatchet
- Website: fremontunified.org/washington/
- Washington Union High School
- U.S. National Register of Historic Places
- Location within San Francisco Bay Area Location within California Location within the United States
- Coordinates: 37°33′10″N 121°59′38″W
- Area: 4.6 acres (1.9 ha)
- Built: 1935
- Architects: Meyers, Henry H.
- Architectural style: Late 19th- and 20th-century revivals
- NRHP reference No.: 81000145
- Added to NRHP: October 5, 1981

Washington High School (WHS) is the oldest of the five comprehensive public high schools in Fremont, California, United States. It was established in 1891. It is a part of the Fremont Unified School District.

== Demographics ==
The demographic breakdown of the 1,901 students enrolled for the 2023–2024 school year was:

- 51.9% Asian
- 25.5% Hispanic or Latino
- 13.0% White
- 5.0% Two or more races
- 3.4% Black
- 0.7% Pacific Islander/Native Hawaiian
- 0.5% American Indian or Alaska Native

== Extracurricular activities ==
=== Athletics ===
Washington High School is a member of the Mission Valley Athletic League (MVAL), which includes high schools in Fremont as well as Newark Memorial High School in Newark, James Logan High School in Union City, and Moreau Catholic High School in Hayward. The league competes within the North Coast Section of the California Interscholastic Federation. The sports offered include cross country, American football, gymnastics, girls' tennis, girls' volleyball and water polo in the fall; basketball, soccer and wrestling in the winter; and badminton, baseball, softball, golf, lacrosse swimming, track and field, seniors vs. juniors powderpuff, boys' volleyball and boys' tennis in the spring. Cheerleading is done year-round. The 5,000 seat Tak Fudenna Stadium which serves all of Fremont's five comprehensive high schools for sports venues is located on the Washington High School campus.

=== Student publications ===
The student newspaper is a monthly titled The Hatchet. Some have been scanned in. The school's yearbook is the Washingtonian. The Hatchet won the Best of the West award in 2011 during the JEANC State Convention. A student literary magazine, The Scrivener, is published by the student club The Scrivener Society (formally Media Analysis Republic) once a year.

== Notable alumni and faculty ==
- Steve Barnett: retired NFL offensive lineman
- DeAndre Carter: NFL wide receiver and return specialist for the Los Angeles Chargers.
- John Doyle (1966–): amateur and professional soccer player and coach
- Dennis Eckersley (1954–): MLB pitcher
- Steven Kwan: MLB outfielder for the Cleveland Guardians
- Mikh McKinney (1992–): professional basketball player
- Lee Murchison: former NFL player. He transferred before his senior season
- Bill Walsh (1931–2007): Washington High School football coach, 1957–1959
- Lyle West: class of 1995, NFL safety
- Robin Williams: author
- John Woodcock (1954–1998): NFL defensive lineman
