= John Anton (soccer) =

American soccer player (born 1955)

Personal information
- Full name: John Anton
- Date of birth: April 4, 1955 (age 71)
- Place of birth: San Francisco, California, U.S.
- Position: Midfielder

Youth career
- 1973–1977: San Francisco Dons

Senior career*
Years	Team	Apps	(Gls)
1979	Edmonton Drillers	23	(3)
1980	San Diego Sockers		
- * Club domestic league appearances and goals

John Anton (born April 4, 1955) is an American retired soccer forward who played professionally in the North American Soccer League.

After playing fours years of high school soccer at Newark High School under Frank Mangiola, Anton attended the University of San Francisco, playing on the men's soccer team from 1973 to 1977. In 1979, he signed with the Edmonton Drillers of the North American Soccer League. He may have played for the San Diego Sockers in 1980.

John currently resides in Novato, California with his wife and kids, where he coaches youth soccer.
