= Mission Valley Athletic League =

Corporation of eight schools, seven of which are in California and one in Hayward

The Mission Valley Athletic League (commonly abbreviated MVAL) is a corporation of eight schools, of which seven are in the Tri-Cities area of Fremont, Newark and Union City, California and one is in Hayward. The MVAL is part of the Bay Shore Conference in the North Coast Section (NCS).

== Affiliations ==
=== Participating schools ===
There are eight participating schools in this athletic league. There are five schools in Fremont: American, Irvington, Kennedy, Mission, and Washington. There is one school each in the cities of Hayward, Newark and Union City – Moreau, Newark Memorial and James Logan, respectively.

=== Sports affiliations ===
In autumn the league sponsors football, girls' and boys' cross-country, girls' tennis, girls' and boys' water polo and girls' volleyball along with girls' golf. In winter, the league sponsors girls' and boys' basketball, girls' and boys' soccer, and wrestling. In spring, the league sponsors girls' and boys' track and field, baseball, softball, boys' tennis, volleyball, and badminton, and girls' and boys' swimming and golf.

=== School classification ===
The North Coast Section (NCS) maintains a classification system based on school enrollment as the primary determinant of qualification for certain sports competitions, specifically the NCS playoffs brackets. This classification system is updated by the NCS Board of Governors every year based on the prior year's CBEDS enrollment report. The sports of baseball, football, soccer, softball, track and field, and boys’ volleyball use these rankings within the NCS playoff structures.

For example, in the case of football, out of the seven schools, James Logan High School and Newark Memorial High School qualify for the NCS 4-A tournaments in football. Four schools, American High School, Irvington High School, Mission San Jose High School and Washington High School are eligible for NCS 3-A tournaments, and one school, John F. Kennedy High School is eligible at the NCS 2-A level.

However, the NCS 4-A, 3-A and 2-A, etc. structure is primarily used for football competition. Under a slightly modified classification system, James Logan, Newark Memorial, American, Washington, Irvington and Mission San Jose all fall under Division I in some playoff structures, such as basketball, while Kennedy is the only school that remains in Division III in these such playoff structures. This structure is utilized in boys' and girls' basketball.

The NCS's newest (2009) designations for boys' volleyball (spring sport) allow for a seven-team MVAL, though Newark Memorial and Irvington do not participate. Castro Valley High and Moreau Catholic move in for boys' volleyball as Division 1 and Division 3 teams respectively. James Logan, Washington, American, and Mission San Jose are Div 1, and only JF.Kennedy is currently Div 2. These divisions are developed based on individual school populations.

== MVAL commissioner ==
The MVAL commissioner is usually selected by the previous commissioner, and generally holds office until their decision to step down. The commissioner holds the final discretion in all MVAL League matches, and is responsible for holding meetings with MVAL coaches and athletic directors of the individual schools from time to time. The commissioner also works with the schools and the coaches to develop a schedule for league play every year.

The current commissioner, Tom Breen, was a 1968 graduate and multi-sport athlete of Newark High School. Tom went on to play football at Ottawa University in Kansas. He returned to coach football and basketball at Memorial High until 1981 when the school combined with Newark High to form Newark Memorial High. He then coached badminton until 1997 when he became the vice principal at Newark Memorial.

The prior commissioner was Frank Gygax. Gygax is an anatomy and physiology teacher at American High School, and has been the coach of American High's swimming team for the past 30 years. Gygax announced at the end of 2006 that he would be stepping down after four years in the post of Commissioner. Frank commented that he will likely remain a figure around the MVAL for the next year.

Gygax was selected by the previous commissioner, Robert Vares Jr, who was selected to be the vice principal of American High School. Vares chose to step down from the post due to the high level of involvement of his new post. Vares remained very prominent in the League however, continuing to guide Gygax, as well as attending MVAL matches until his death in September 2003 after a long battle with cancer.

== Successful programs ==
In the latest years, the MVAL has shown its greatest strength in football, wrestling, track and field, and badminton. Some of the more successful schools have been James Logan, in football, girls' water polo, girls' volleyball, basketball and baseball. Newark Memorial has been successful in boys' basketball, girls' and boys' wrestling, boys' soccer, and baseball. American has excelled in cross country, boys' and girls' basketball, girls' soccer, boys' tennis and golf. Irvington has been successful in baseball, softball and cross country. Mission has excelled in girls' and boys' tennis, girls' golf, wrestling, badminton, girls' and boys' waterpolo, girls' and boys' volleyball, cross country (having recently won multiple back to back league championships, sent runners to Arcadia track championships, and to the California state meet after great success at NCS races) and swimming. Washington has been exceptional in cross country, football, girls' volleyball, girls' and boys' soccer, baseball, softball, boys' volleyball, and girls' basketball. Kennedy, the only Division III school in the league, has been competitive in boys' basketball and football, but not too competitive in other sports. Has not really found many strengths, leaving it as the cellar team of the league, most likely because of its low enrollment. Mission's boys' volleyball team ranked 2nd in NCS in 2009, only losing to Foothill High School of Pleasanton. The Newark Memorial girls' wrestling team is one of the best in the state, winning NCS in the 2008–2009 and 2009–2010 season and also placing top 5 in state both years.
