= Moreau Catholic High School =

Private coeducational school in Hayward, California, United States

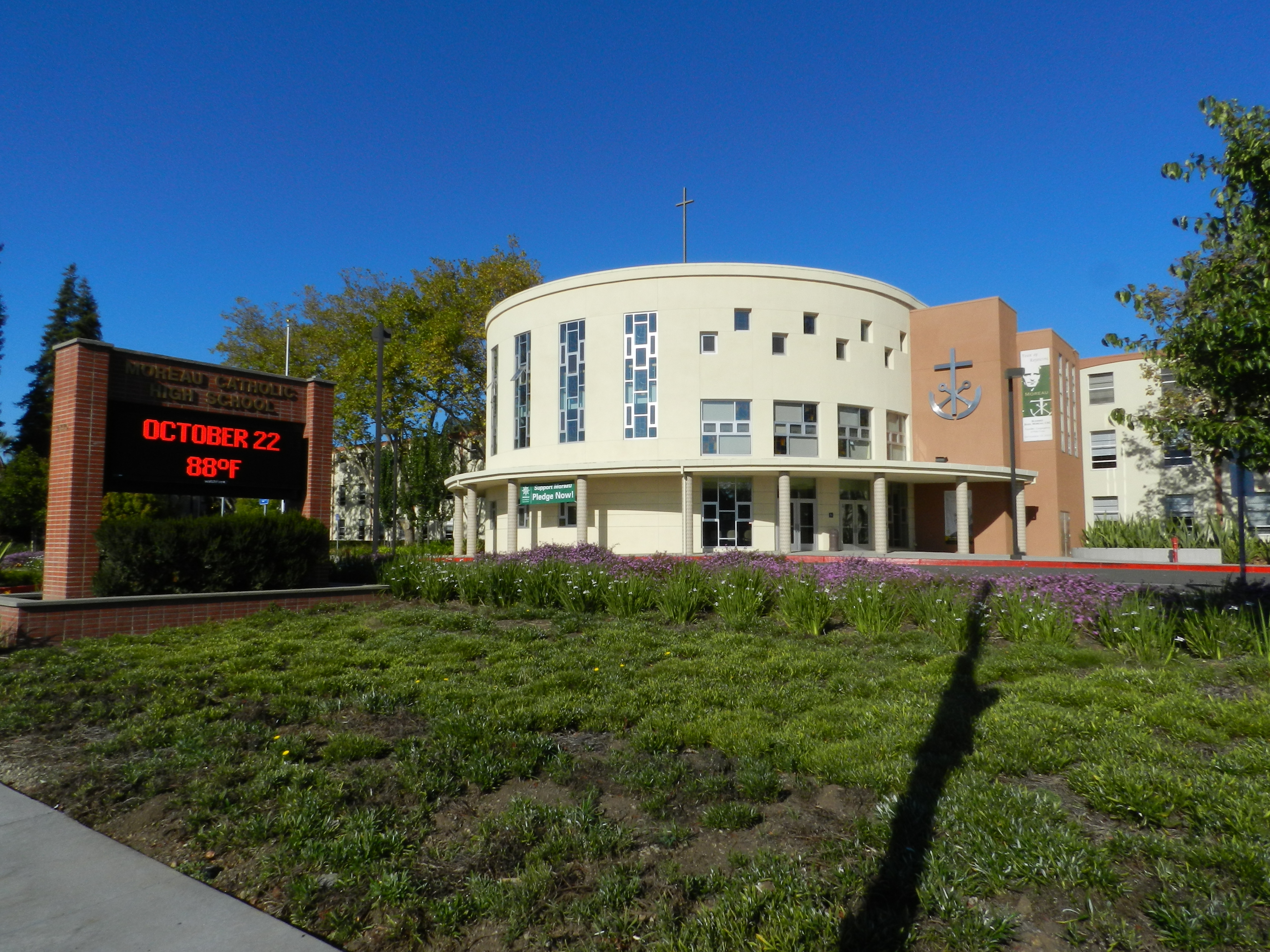

Location
- 27170 Mission Boulevard; Hayward, California 94544; United States; 37°38′37″N 122°3′37″W

Information
- Type: Private, Coeducational
- Motto: In Tenebris Lux (In darkness there is light)
- Religious affiliations: Roman Catholic; Brothers of Holy Cross
- Established: 1965
- School district: Diocese of Oakland
- President: Elizabeth Guneratne
- Principal: Colleen Galloway
- Faculty: 61
- Grades: 9-12
- Enrollment: 960 (2017)
- Student to teacher ratio: 14:1
- Hours in school day: 6 hours 40 minutes
- Campus size: 14 acres (57,000 m^{2})
- Colors: Green and gold
- Mascot: Baz The Mariner
- Team name: Mariners
- Accreditation: Western Association of Schools and Colleges
- Newspaper: Explorer
- Yearbook: Voyager
- Website: School website

Moreau Catholic High School is a Catholic high school sponsored by the Moreau Province of the Congregation of Holy Cross. It is located in Hayward, California, within the Diocese of Oakland.

== History ==
Moreau Catholic High School was the first school to be named after Blessed Basil Moreau, the founder of the Holy Cross Family. Temporarily located on the parish grounds of St. Bede's Church, Moreau opened its doors in 1965 to a class of 103 ninth grade boys. That same year, construction of the permanent campus at the current location began, with financial and community support from the members of the Diocese of Oakland, the late Bishop Floyd Begin, and the Brothers of Holy Cross, South-West province. Construction was completed in the spring of 1967.

At the time, Moreau was the only Catholic high school serving the Southern Alameda County. As such, at the request of Bishop Begin, Moreau became a coeducational institution in 1969, with the admission of 177 ninth grade girls.

Bishop Allen Vigneron and Hayward Mayor Roberta Cooper officiated at the April 30, 2006 groundbreaking ceremony for a multimillion-dollar expansion at Moreau. The project included increasing the school library, adding a state-of-the-art life and physical science laboratory and classroom, and building a film and video arts studio and multi-media classroom.

== Academics ==
Moreau offers more than 40 Honors and AP courses. Moreau Catholic is accredited by the Western Catholic Educational Association and the Western Association of Schools and Colleges.

Moreau Catholic was one of eight schools in California and 54 schools nationwide to be selected as a 2010 Apple Distinguished School. Moreau has twice been named a Blue Ribbon School.

Some of the courses offered at Moreau Catholic include: AP Biology, AP Chemistry, AP Physics, AP Calculus AB/BC, AP Environmental Science, AP Psychology, AP Chinese Language and Culture, AP Government, and AP Statistics.

== Athletics ==
Moreau is a member of the Mission Valley Athletic League (MVAL), which includes high schools in Fremont as well as Newark Memorial High School in Newark and James Logan High School in Union City. The league competes within the North Coast Section of the California Interscholastic Federation.

Teams include: Football, Cross Country, Girls Volleyball, Girls Tennis, Girls Golf, Girls Lacrosse, Boys Lacrosse, Rally Squad, Boys Basketball, Girls Basketball, Boys Soccer, Girls Soccer, Badminton, Baseball, Softball, Track and Field, Swimming, men's and women's Water Polo, Boys Golf, Boys Tennis, and Boys Volleyball. (Girls Basketball won the State Championship in the 1992-1993 season )

== Visual and Performing Arts ==
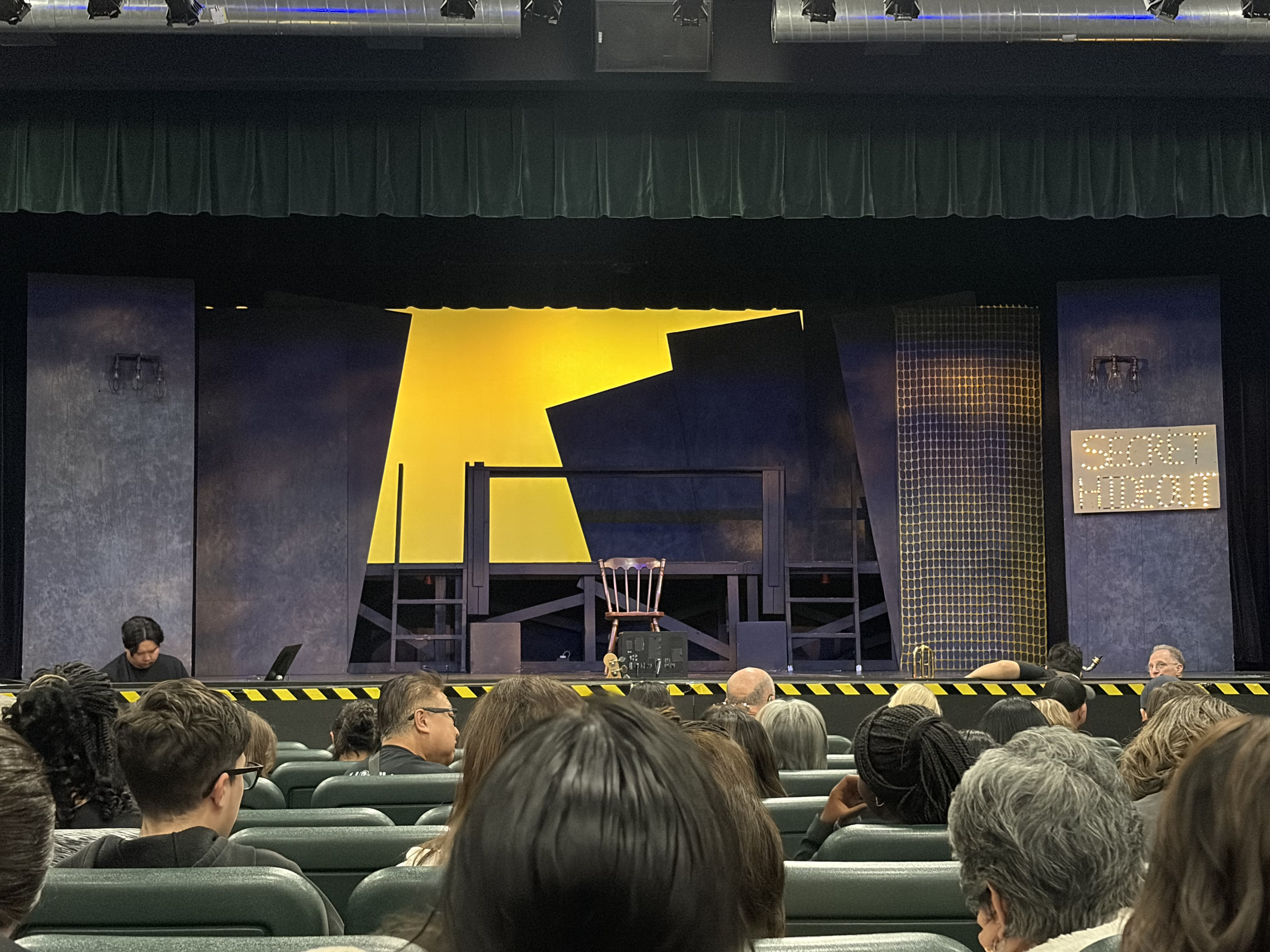
Intermission of Urinetown at Moreau Catholic High School (Theves Theatre)

The school offers courses in choral and instrumental music, dance, theater, and the visual arts, including and Honors Dance Class.

== Notable alumni ==
- Cindy Chavez, vice mayor of San Jose
- Adam Copeland, Sports Radio Host KNBR, San Francisco
- Brian Copeland, author, comedian, playwright, actor. Member of the Bay Area Radio Hall of Fame.
- Vanessa Curry, dancer, member of the Pussycat Dolls
- Marco Dapper, actor/model, star of Eating Out 2: Sloppy Seconds
- Bryn Davies, musician
- Kaleb Elarms-Orr, college football linebacker for the TCU Horned Frogs
- Rosa Gumataotao Rios, Treasurer of the United States
- Darren Lewis, Major League Baseball player
- Steven J. Lopes, bishop of the Personal Ordinariate of the Chair of Saint Peter
- Kevin Nadal, author/ activist
- Alex Pham, baseball player
- Nikko Reed, NFL cornerback for the Los Angeles Chargers
- Joe Trippi, political campaign strategist
- Necar Zadegan, actress
