= CIF North Coast Section =

Administrative division of the California Interscholastic Federation

- Abbreviation: CIF-NCS
- Type: NPO
- Legal status: Association
- Purpose: Athletic
- Location: San Ramon, California
- Region served: Northern California coastal counties, East Bay region
- Affiliations: California Interscholastic Federation

The North Coast Section (NCS) is a part of the California Interscholastic Federation, governing the eastern portion of the San Francisco Bay Area, up along the northern coast of the state of California, from Fremont in the south to Crescent City in the north. It also governs the private schools in the city of Oakland. Due to this split in regions, the section is split in two for some championships, including football.

== Governance ==
The section is governed by a board of managers, whose voting members include representatives from member leagues, superintendents, school board associations and private schools. There are 155 full member schools, assigned to leagues or conferences according to NCS Alignment and Classification Bylaws developed by the schools. In addition, currently 20 schools have affiliated with the league to play as independents without the benefit of a league to guarantee opponents.

== Conference and League Structure ==
Competition is broken down into a system of conferences and leagues which seek to organize schools first by size/competitiveness, and then by geographic proximity.

- North Coast Section
  - Bay Area Conference - 27 schools
    - Bay Counties League - 7 schools
    - Bay Counties League - West - 6 schools
    - Bay Counties League - East - 7 schools
    - Bay Counties League - Central - 7 schools
  - Bay Shore Conference - 33 schools
    - Mission Valley Athletic League - 8 schools
    - Tri-County Athletic League - 13 schools
    - West Alameda County Conference - 12 schools
  - Coastal Mountain Conference - 24 schools
    - North Central League I - 8 schools
    - North Central League II - 7 schools
    - North Central League III - 9 schools
    - Humboldt-Del Norte League - 12 schools
      - Big 5 – 5 schools
      - Little 7 - 7 schools
  - Redwood Empire Conference - 29 schools
    - Marin County Athletic League - 9 schools
    - North Bay League - 13 schools
    - Vine Valley Athletic League - 7 schools
  - Valley Conference - 30 schools
    - Bay Valley Athletic League - 7 schools
    - Diablo Athletic League - 13 schools
    - East Bay Athletic League - 11 schools
    - Non-League Affiliate Member Schools - 20 schools
      - Archbishop Hanna High School (Sonoma)
      - Averroes High School (Fremont)
      - Cornerstone Christian School (Antioch)
      - Cristo Rey De La Salle East Bay High School (Oakland)
      - Developing Virtue Secondary School (Ukiah)
      - El Sobrante Christian School (Richmond)
      - Emery Secondary School (Emeryville)
      - The Marin School (Mill Valley)
      - Napa Christian (Napa)
      - North Bay Christian Academy (Novato)
      - North Hills Christian (Vallejo)
      - Pacific Union College Prep (Angwin)
      - Patten Academy of Christian Education (Oakland)
      - Pleasant Hill Adventist Academy (Pleasant Hill)
      - The Quarry Lane School (Dublin)
      - Rio Lindo Adventist Academy (Healdsburg)
      - Stellar Prep (Oakland)
      - Summerfield Waldorf of Santa Rosa
      - Summit K2
      - Summit Tamalpais
    - Single-sport waiver schools
      - California School for the Deaf, Fremont (football)
      - Oakland Military Institute (football, provisional WACC member)
      - San Marin High School (Novato) (football, provisional NBL member)
      - Valley Christian School (Dublin) (football)

=== Playoff Structure ===
The section employs 5 different classes, 4A, 3A, 2A, A, and B. Depending on the sport, the "classes" may be represented by Divisions: I, II, III, IV, V, & VI, with DI being the largest schools, and DVI being the smallest. Some sports, including football, split the 3A and 2A sections into East Bay, for most of the Section's Bay Area schools, and Redwood Empire, for schools from Marin County north to the Oregon border. The section has championships in badminton, baseball, basketball, cross country, football, golf, lacrosse, soccer, softball, swimming and diving, tennis, track and field, volleyball, water polo, and wrestling.
