= Cesar Chavez (disambiguation) =

Cesar Chavez (1927–1993) was an American farm worker, labor leader, and civil rights activist.

Cesar Chavez may also refer to:

== Places ==
=== Communities ===
- César Chávez, Texas

=== Parks ===
- César Chávez Park in Berkeley, California
- Cesar Chavez Plaza in Sacramento, California
- César E. Chávez National Monument in Keene, California

=== Schools ===
- César Chávez Academy in Detroit, Michigan
- César Chávez Middle School (disambiguation), multiple schools
- Chávez High School (disambiguation), multiple schools
- Colegio Cesar Chavez in Mount Angel, Oregon

=== Streets ===
- Cesar Chavez Avenue in Los Angeles, California
- Cesar Chavez Street in San Francisco, California
- César E Chávez Boulevard (Portland, Oregon)
- Central Expressway (Dallas), also known as César Chávez Boulevard
- Texas State Highway 44, also known as the Cesar Chavez Memorial Highway
- Texas State Highway Loop 375, partly known as the César Chávez Border Highway

=== Others ===
- Cesar Chavez/67th Street station in Houston, Texas
- Cesar Chavez (statue), a statue in Austin, Texas

== People ==
- Cesar Chavez (politician) (born 1987), former Arizona state representative
- Cesar Chavez (journalist) (born 1965), Filipino journalist and civil servant
- Cesar Chavez Jacobo (born 1985), Dominican basketball player
- Julio César Chávez (born 1962), Mexican boxer
- Julio César Chávez Jr. (born 1986), Mexican boxer

== Other ==
- César Chavez (film), a 2014 biographical film
- Cesar Chavez Convocation, an annual celebration at the University of California, Santa Cruz
- Cesar Chavez Day, a holiday in California in honor of Cesar Chavez
- USNS Cesar Chavez (T-AKE-14), a Lewis and Clark-class dry cargo ship
