= California Historical Landmarks in Alameda County =

List table of the properties and districts listed as California Historical Landmarks within Alameda County, Northern California.

- Note: Click the "Map of all coordinates" link to the right to view a Google map of all properties and districts with latitude and longitude coordinates in the table below.

== Listings ==
Image		Landmark name	Location	City or town	Summary
Alameda Terminal - First Transcontinental Railroad	440	Alameda Terminal - First Transcontinental Railroad	NW corner of Lincoln Ave and Webster St; 37°46′31″N 122°16′37″W	Alameda	First transcontinental railroad reaching Alameda Terminal on September 6, 1869
Berkeley City Club	908	Berkeley City Club	2315 Durant Ave; 37°52′03″N 122°15′46″W	Berkeley	Also on the NRHP list as NPS-77000282
Camino of Rancho San Antonio	299	Camino of Rancho San Antonio	SW corner of Oakland and Santa Clara Aves. 37°49′28″N 122°15′32″W	San Leandro	
Site of the China Clipper flight departure	968	Site of the China Clipper flight departure	Alameda Naval Air Station; 37°47′10″N 122°19′07″W	Alameda	
Church of St. James the Apostle	694	Church of St. James the Apostle	1540 12th Ave. 37°47′30″N 122°14′46″W	Oakland	
Coast Guard Lightship WLV 605	1036	Coast Guard Lightship WLV 605	Jack London Square; 37°47′44″N 122°16′50″W	Oakland	Also on the NRHP list as NPS-89002462
Concannon Vineyard	641	Concannon Vineyard	4590 Tesla Rd. 37°40′00″N 121°44′23″W	Livermore	
Croll Building	954	Croll Building	1400 Webster St. 37°46′18″N 122°16′36″W	Alameda	Also on the NRHP list as NPS-82000960
Casa de Estudillo (or Estudillo Home)	279	Casa de Estudillo (or Estudillo Home)	550 W Estudillo Ave. 37°43′24″N 122°09′36″W	San Leandro	
Cresta Blanca Winery	586	Cresta Blanca Winery	5050 Arroyo Rd. 37°37′24″N 121°45′23″W	Livermore	
First Unitarian Church of Oakland	896	First Unitarian Church of Oakland	685 14th St. 37°48′23″N 122°16′36″W	Oakland	Also on the NRHP list as NPS-77000284
Fox Court	N1018	Fox Court	1472–1478 University Ave.	Berkeley	
Francisco Solano Alviso Adobe	510	Francisco Solano Alviso Adobe	3459 Foothill Rd. 37°39′38″N 121°54′43″W	Pleasanton	
Joaquin Miller Home	107	Joaquin Miller Home	3300 Joaquin Miller Rd. 37°48′45″N 122°11′08″W	Oakland	Also on the NRHP list as NPS-66000204
Leland Stanford Winery	642	Leland Stanford Winery	330 Stanford Ave. 37°30′13″N 121°54′43″W	Fremont	
Upload Photo	241	Livermore Memorial Monument	Portola Park; 37°41′28″N 121°46′26″W	Livermore	
Mills Hall	849	Mills Hall	Mills College; 37°46′45″N 122°10′57″W	Oakland	Also on the NRHP list as NPS-71000132
Mission San José	334	Mission San José	Mission Blvd at Washington Blvd. 37°32′02″N 121°55′12″W	Fremont	Also on the NRHP list as NPS-71000131
Paramount Theatre	884	Paramount Theatre	2025 Broadway; 37°48′36″N 122°16′04″W	Oakland	Also on the NRHP list as NPS-73000395
Pardee Home	1027	Pardee Home	672 11th St. 37°48′18″N 122°16′35″W	Oakland	Also on the NRHP list as NPS-76000476
Upload Photo	925	Peralta Hacienda Site	2465 34th Ave. 37°47′13″N 122°13′03″W	Oakland	
Peralta Home	285	Peralta Home	561 Lafayette; 37°43′51″N 122°09′41″W	San Leandro	
Piedmont Way	986	Piedmont Way	Piedmont Ave. between Gayley Rd. and Dwight Way; 37°52′04″N 122°15′07″W	Berkeley	
Upload Photo	970	Rainbow trout species identified	50 yards past Redwood Gate entrance kiosk, Redwood Regional Park; 37°48′10″N 122°08′44″W	Oakland	
Upload Photo	246	Rancho San Antonio (Peralta Grant)	NW corner of E. 14th and Hays Sts. 37°43′38″N 122°09′29″W	San Leandro	
San Leandro Oyster Beds	824	San Leandro Oyster Beds	San Leandro Marina; 37°41′43″N 122°11′36″W	San Leandro	
Site of Blossom Rock Navigation Trees	962	Site of Blossom Rock Navigation Trees	Redwood Regional Park, Roberts Regional Recreation Area, near the Madrone Picnic Tables; 37°48′41″N 122°10′26″W	Oakland	
Site of College of California	45	Site of College of California	NE corner of 13th & Franklin Sts. 37°48′12″N 122°16′13″W	Oakland	
Site of the First County Courthouse	503	Site of the First County Courthouse	30977 Union City Blvd. and Smith St. 37°35′48″N 122°04′52″W	Union City	
Upload Photo	776	Site of the First Public School in Castro Valley	19200 Redwood Rd. 37°42′24″N 122°04′26″W	Castro Valley	
Site of the nation's first successful sugar beet factory	768	Site of the nation's first successful sugar beet factory	30849 Dyer St. 37°36′02″N 122°04′14″W	Union City	
Upload Photo	676	Site of Saint Mary's College	3093 Broadway; 37°49′14″N 122°15′41″W	Oakland	
Site of Shell Mound	335	Site of Shell Mound	4600 block of Shell Mound St. 37°50′02″N 122°17′33″W	Emeryville	
Ukrania, Site of Agapius Honcharenko Farmstead	1025	Ukrania, Site of Agapius Honcharenko Farmstead	Garin Regional Park; 37°38′23″N 122°00′35″W	Hayward	
University of California, Berkeley campus	946	University of California, Berkeley campus	University of California, Berkeley; 37°52′12″N 122°15′32″W	Berkeley	Also on the NRHP list as NPS-82004638
USS Hornet	1029	USS Hornet	Pier 3 North, Alameda Point, 707 West Hornet Dr. 37°46′22″N 122°18′10″W	Alameda	
Vallejo Flour Mill	46	Vallejo Flour Mill	Mission Blvd, 1/2 west of Vallejo Mill Historical Park; 37°34′43″N 121°58′39″W	Fremont	
Wente Bros. Winery	957	Wente Bros. Winery	5565 Tesla Rd. 37°37′26″N 121°45′25″W	Livermore	

== See also ==
- List of California Historical Landmarks
- List of Berkeley Landmarks in Berkeley, California
- National Register of Historic Places listings in Alameda County, California
