= 1956 Niles Canyon Douglas R5D-2 crash =

1956 aviation accident in California

Coordinates: 37°37′8.18″N 121°57′28.16″W

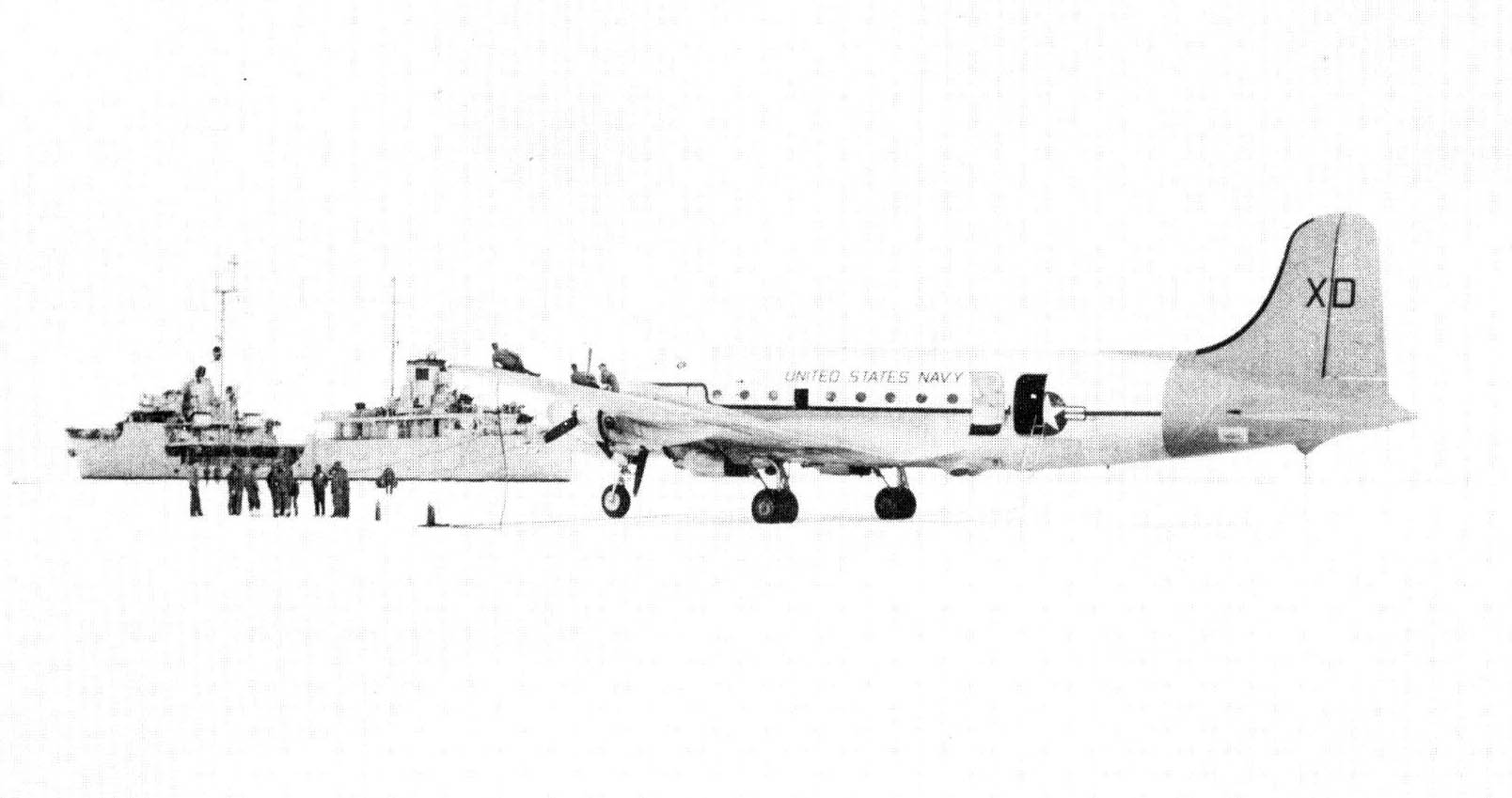
- A similar Douglas R5D as crashed; pictured in 1956

Accident
- Date: February 17, 1956
- Summary: Deviation from prescribed flight path, premature descent in low visibility
- Site: Niles Canyon, c. 3.5 miles (5.6 km) northeast of Niles, California

Aircraft
- Aircraft type: Douglas R5D-2 Skymaster
- Operator: United States Marine Corps
- Registration: WC 116
- Flight origin: Marine Corps Air Station El Toro
- Destination: Naval Air Station Alameda
- Passengers: 35
- Crew: 5
- Fatalities: 40
- Survivors: 0

On 17 February 1956 in California a United States Marine Corps Douglas R5D-2 Skymaster flying from Marine Corps Air Station El Toro to Naval Air Station Alameda crashed on approach north of Niles Canyon, about 3.5 miles (5.6 km) northeast of Niles, California. All 35 marines and 5 crew members died. A Marine Corps board of inquiry determined that the crash was due to "pilot error".

It was the first time this type of aircraft crashed and the third major airplane crash in the Niles Canyon area in the five years since the crash of United Air Lines Flight 615 near Decoto in August 1951.

== Flight and crash ==
The Douglas R5D-2 Skymaster, Bureau Number 39116, and used by United States Marine Corps Marine Transport Squadron 152, departed Marine Corps Air Station El Toro at 10:30 am for a routine flight to Naval Air Station Alameda. Aboard were 35 American Marines from Marine Corps Base Camp Pendleton en route to duty in Hawaii and five crew members from El Toro.

After circling for thirty minutes because of bad weather, the pilot advised Oakland Municipal Airport at 1:42 pm that he was approaching NAS Alameda on descent. However the aircraft flew through low overcast and drizzling rain to collide with a steep canyon wall at 1:45. It had flown over Sunol ridge, crossed Stonybrook Canyon where it was seen by an aircraft technician who lived in the area, just barely cleared the west wall of Stonybrook Canyon and crashed into a box canyon on Walpert Ridge about 3.5 miles (5.6 km) northeast of Niles, California. Initial reports assumed that an explosion occurred in the air. The aircraft broke up and burned, scattering debris over 300 yards.

== Rescue operation ==
Immediately, the Alameda County Sheriff's substation received calls of a low-flying plane and possible crash. In the low clouds and fog and that camouflaged the smoke from the burning wreckage, helicopters dispatched from the Coast Guard and Air Force originally mistook debris from an earlier United Airlines crash for that of the military transport. Stonybrook Canyon resident Ray Stephan had seen the plane fly over and heard the crash. He said he heard six gunshots and thought it was a signal from survivors so he and neighbor George King hiked an hour to reach the wreckage. About an hour after the crash, the fog briefly broke and Oakland Tribune photographer Russ Reed and his pilot Warren Bogges were able to see the smoke rising from the impact site. They were the first to spot and photograph the debris field. Military personnel bulldozed a temporary road for jeeps and trucks to carry the victims over one and a half miles of scrub brush to the temporary collection site.

== Identifying the victims ==
The identities of the passengers were unclear at first. Five Marine transport aircraft had left El Toro flying to Naval Air Station Alameda with their consignments of marines headed to Hawaii. The passenger manifests for flights 3 and 4 were unknowingly switched and when El Toro was notified of the crash, they forwarded the wrong passenger list to Washington. The casualties were incorrectly identified and the marines who had been reported dead were actually alive. Several phoned their families before their families were notified by the Marine Corps, but others had difficulty calming their distraught relatives. In addition, Marine Donald J. Fraser had stowed away on the plane. The day before the crash, he had written to his family that he wouldn't come home for his 22nd birthday because he "had the duty", but boarded the plane at the last moment to surprise his parents.

Though the initial report stated that four people were able to save themselves with the aid of their parachutes and four others were missing, all forty people on board were killed.

== Those lost in the crash ==
The flight crew from Marine Corps Air Station El Toro:

- Major Alexander Baker Watson—pilot: Santa Ana, California. 32, married.
- First Lieutenant Thomas Earl Straughan—first officer: Santa Ana, California. 25, married.
- Master Sergeant Donald J. Down—navigator: Costa Mesa, California. 32, married with three children.
- Staff Sergeant Carroll M. Young (name confirmed by daughter) —flight engineer: Santa Ana, California. 25, married with two children.
- Staff Sergeant Harry Eldridge Knight—communications: Santa Ana, California. 28, married with three children.

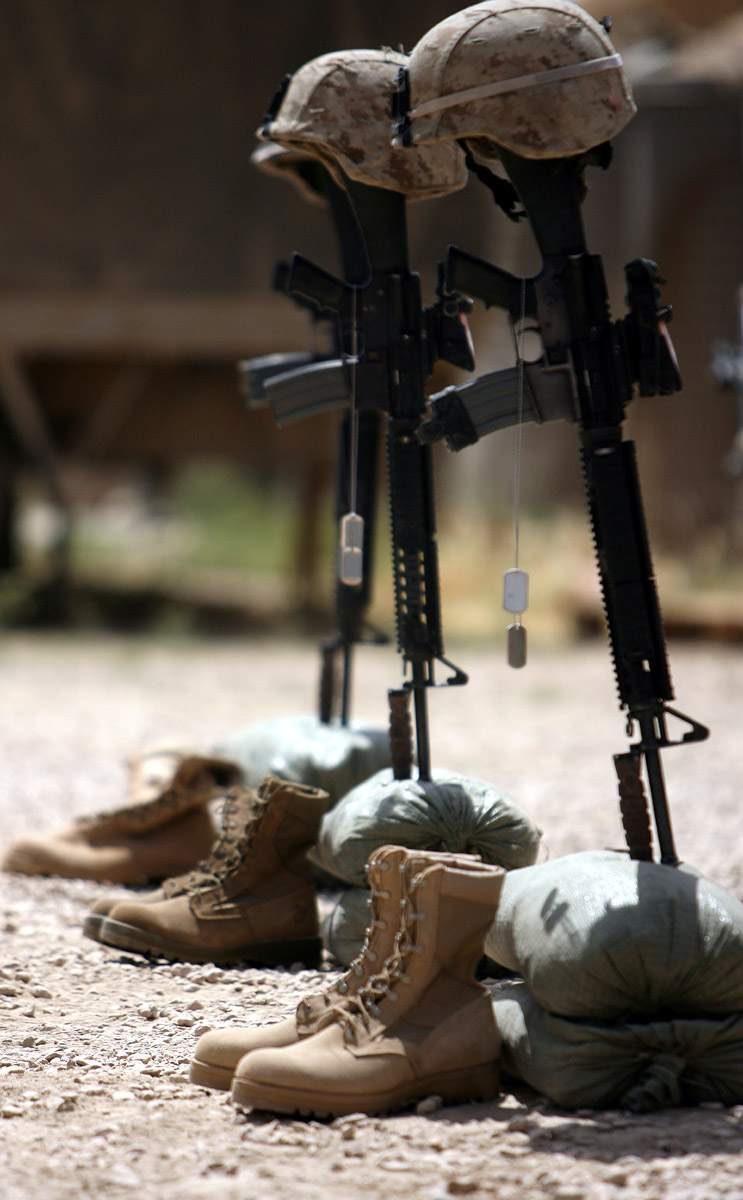
The battlefield cross

The passengers, marines from Marine Corps Base Camp Pendleton:

- Sergeant Jimmie Oscar Henninger: Corpus Christie, Texas.
- Private William Wayne Henson: Omaha, Nebraska.
- Private Salvador Rubin Hernandez: Oelwein, Iowa.
- Private First Class James Robert Hill: Amarillo, Texas.
- Corporal Fred Franklin Holcombe Jr.: Sun Valley, California.
- Private Larry Horton: Des Moines, Iowa.
- Private First Class Charles Loyd Howard: Corvallis, Oregon.
- Corporal George Augustine Howard: Washington, D. C.
- Private John Robert Hoxsey: San Clemente, California.
- Private Bennie Richard Jestis: Bonham, Texas.
- Private David Richard Kendrick: Portland, Oregon.
- Private Robert Dale La Duke: Everett, Washington.
- Private Michael Delbert Leedom: Seattle, Washington.
- Private Donald Francis Lovelady: Forest City, Missouri.
- Corporal Marvin Lowe: Liggett, Kentucky.
- Private Juan Magana: Silao, Guanajuato, Mexico.
- Corporal Herbert Fausto Mamaril: Wailuka, Island of Maui, Hawaii.
- Private John Donald Marion: Norton, Virginia.
- Private Terry Glenn Maxwell: Mason City, Iowa.
- Private William J. McKendry: Denver, Colorado.
- Corporal George Walter McReynolds: Springfield, Missouri.
- Sergeant Walter D. Meaux: New Iberia, Louisiana.
- Private David Lee Moody: Wichita, Kansas.
- Private William T. Moore: Woodside, New York.
- Private James Lawrence Mulholland: North Clinton, Iowa.
- Private First Class Frank W. Mulligan: Daly City, California.
- Sergeant James Michael Murray: St. Louis, Missouri.
- Private Robert Edward Myers: Springfield, Illinois.
- Private First Class Donald Ray Myrick: Star City, Arkansas.
- Private William Raymond Neely: Oklahoma City, Oklahoma.
- Private Rodney James Nelson: Davenport, Iowa.
- Private Glenn Irvin Newton: Beaver Creek, Oregon.
- Private James Erwin Norris: Lowell, Michigan.
- Private Robert Lawrence Offenburger: Oelwein, Iowa.
- Staff Sergeant Donald Joseph Fraser: San Francisco.

== Investigation ==
Lee Housman, the Oakland air traffic controller at the time of the accident, told investigators that Major Watson first contacted the control tower shortly after 1 pm. Watson was told to join the eight other planes in holding patterns in the skies over the area, awaiting clearance to land because of poor visibility. "We brought him down 1,000 feet at a time," Housman said, "Then, at 13:42 he reported he was at 3,500 feet, and we told him to begin his approach. His voice was calm, and everything appeared to be normal." The plane crashed three minutes later at an elevation of 1330 feet. Housman said he couldn't explain why the plane lost so much altitude so quickly, if it did at all. The pilots could have mistaken their altitude, but Ray Stepan said they had to have been at 1600 feet to clear the side of Stonybrook Canyon opposite him. Housman said Watson's last communication with him was that he was on the beam of the Newark radio beacon, meaning he was on course, but the plane crashed about six miles northeast of the approach lanes to the naval airstation.

The Marine Corps board of inquiry into the cause of the crash found that the flight crew's deviated from prescribed flight path, that they deviated from the radio beacon and made the descent in an unprescribed manner.
