= Purple Lotus Buddhist School =

Defunct Buddhist school in California, USA

Coordinates: 37.599630°N 122.022744°W

Purple Lotus Buddhist School was a K–12 school located in Union City, California. It was founded in July 1997. The school was accredited by the Western Association of Schools and Colleges. The school closed in 2016.
