= 300 North Los Angeles Street Federal Building =

Government office building in California

- Federal Building
- U.S. National Register of Historic Places
- Federal Building in 2016

- Location within the Los Angeles metropolitan area Location within California Location within the United States
- Location: 300 N Los Angeles St., Los Angeles, California
- Coordinates: 34.05390°N 118.24014°W
- Built: 1965
- Architectural style: Modern
- NRHP reference No.: 100006288
- Added to NRHP: March 9, 2021

The 300 North Los Angeles Street Federal Building, located across the street from the Edward R. Roybal Federal Building and United States Courthouse, is a federal building of the United States that opened in 1965 and is now on the National Register of Historic Places. The building is also notable as the site of a 1971 bombing that killed an 18-year-old worker.

The building holds offices for a number of federal agencies, including the U.S. Immigration and Customs Enforcement, U.S. Citizenship and Immigration Services, and the Internal Revenue Service.

== Art and architecture ==
The building hosts three glass mosaics by Los Angeles artist Richard Haines: Celebration of our Homeland, Recognition of All Foreign Lands, and Of the People, for the People, by the People. The building design was a collaboration between Welton Becket & Associates, Albert C. Martin & Associates, and Paul R. Williams & Associates. The building is part of Los Angeles Civic Center Historic District.

=== Gallery ===
View from Temple Street

Front entrance

Lobby

Recognition of All Foreign Lands by Richard Haines

== Bombing ==
An explosion in the second floor of the building on January 28, 1971, killed part-time GSA employee Tomas Ortiz. An investigation by the Federal Bureau of Investigation found no clear perpetrator, although it is believed the attack was made by the Chicano Liberation Front, which was responsible for a series of other bombings in the early 1970s.

== Access ==
Civic Center/Grand Park station is located four blocks from 300 N. Los Angeles. The DASH Downtown D line also circulates past the building on a regular schedule.

== See also ==
- List of Los Angeles federal buildings
- National Register of Historic Places listings in Los Angeles
