= New Haven Adult School =

Location
- 600 G Street; Union City, California 94587-2400; United States; 37.5998°N 122.0202°W

Information
- School type: California Adult School
- Established: 1967
- School district: New Haven Unified School District
- Director: Nancy George
- Age range: 17-any
- Enrollment: approximately 2,500
- Average class size: 20 to 30
- Slogan: Pathway to Success
- Website: adultschool.mynhusd.org

New Haven Adult School is an adult education program in Union City, California. As part of the New Haven Unified School District, the school serves approximately 2,500 community members annually.

== History ==
New Haven Adult School was established in 1967 as Logan Adult School, a program of James Logan High School.

== Campus ==
In September 2000, the school moved into the newly remodeled former Decoto School building.

== Curriculum ==
New Haven Adult School offers courses for a broad range of the local community:

- High school diploma completion and GED preparation courses;
- English language-learning courses and a citizenship class;
- Certificate programs for health care, office, and service occupations;
- Community courses in computer use, health and fitness, and job preparation;
- Various classes for adults over age 55;
- Driver's education and traffic school; and
- Even Start, a broadly-targeted program for qualifying families with children under age 7.
