= Flight 615 =

Flight 615 may refer to:

- United Airlines Flight 615, crashed on 24 August 1951
- Lufthansa Flight 615, hijacked on 29 October 1972
