= Assassination of William Cann =

1974 assassination in California, U.S.

- Location: Our Lady of the Rosary Church; Decoto, Union City, California, USA
- Date: June 11, 1974
- Target: Officer John Miner (planned); William Zaner (planned); William Cann (carried out)
- Deaths: 1
- Injuries: 4 (3 by gunfire)
- Motive: Revenge for death of Alberto Terrones
- Accused: Leonard Baca (shooter), Ruben Vizcarra, Angel Ramirez, Paul Mendoza
- Convicted: Leonard Baca (second-degree murder)

The assassination of Union City, California, police chief William Cann occurred on June 11, 1974, at a public meeting in the Decoto neighborhood. The meeting was intended to address community tension, which was related to the April 1974 police shooting of Alberto Terrones, and to the simmering racial tensions between Chicanos who had settled in Decoto when it was an agricultural area of Alameda County, and newly arrived whites who were remodeling the settlement and the schools in their own image.

== Death of Alberto Terrones ==
Alberto Terrones was born in Los Angeles on April 10, 1944, to a mother with the surname Alvarado. His Social Security number was issued in California. An Albert Terrones married in Alameda in 1964; he was 19, she was 16. He may have fathered a son born 1965. Terrones had past arrests in Union City, Hayward, San Jose and Oakland. He had just turned 30 years old when he was killed on April 19, 1974.

After allegedly stealing three canned hams from a grocery store, Terrones departed the store via bicycle. He reportedly brandished a knife at both clerks at the Lucky supermarket and Union City patrolman John Miner when he arrived to take the theft report. Miner radioed in that Terrones looked like the artist's sketch of an unidentified man who had stabbed two children in a new subdivision earlier that year. (On June 25, 1974, the children's mother confessed to killing her daughter and stabbing her son and making up the story about a crazed Latino randomly breaking into their house and stabbing the children.) Miner told Terrones to drop the knife or he'd shoot; Terrones continued advancing; Miner shot him in the flank with his .357 service weapon. Per Timothy Swenson's Assassination in Decoto, residents of a neighboring trailer park reported that they heard Miner identify himself as a cop and also heard what would be the fatal shot. Miner provided first aid and called an ambulance but Terrones died of his wounds later that evening. The Union City PD, city government, local district attorney, and an Alameda County grand jury all found that Miner's shooting of Terrones was justifiable homicide.

== Sniper attack on community meeting ==
William Cann (December 15, 1941 – August 29, 1974) was born in New York and educated in California. After working for the San Anselmo, Novato, and San Bruno police departments in Northern California, he joined the Union City Police Department as chief of police on March 5, 1973. He was married and was the father of three young children, two sons and a daughter. Cann was 32 years old at the time of his murder.

After a small local riot in late April and at least one graffitied death threat against cops in the wake of the Terrones incident, Cann set up a community meeting in a hall of Our Lady of the Rosary Church at 703 C St in Union City. About 55 people were in attendance, including the parish priest. Cann arrived in plainclothes and stood up to speak to the group. At 9:30 p.m. shots rang out. The bullets came from outside, through a window. Cann was struck in the neck by two 30-caliber rifle bullets. The shooter continued firing after Cann fell, and three others (Robert Portillo, Mrs. Matilda Gudino, and Manuel Pena) were injured by the gunfire. Miguel Aponte was injured in the scramble to escape. Cann was hospitalized in Alameda County, but he was mortally wounded and never regained consciousness. He died from his injuries more than 2 months later on August 29, 1974.

A municipal playground called William Cann Park was dedicated in the late police chief's honor in 1975.

== Claims and theories ==
On June 21, 1974, the San Francisco Chronicle received a mimeographed letter claiming that the "Santos Rodriquez Assault Squad" of the Chicano Liberation Front had killed Cann after their "Revolutionary Tribunal" found him guilty of "murder and attempted coverup." Per the Chron by way of the Associated Press, "the communique indicated the group was patterned after the Symbionese Liberation Army" that had recently assassinated Oakland school superintendent Marcus Foster. Two weeks after the shooting police stated that the letter "could not be authenticated" and had no info on the shooting that was not public.

Also, graffiti also appeared in an unnamed Chicano/Mexican-American neighborhood that read "A ham for a ham."

A 1977 article on the politics of the Chicano Movement reported that a "subsequent communique denied" that the Chicano Liberation Front was involved in the sniper attack.

A 1979 U.S. Senate Judiciary Committee document reported that Miner had been "exonerated and assigned to a desk job," that the Justice Department had visited the town twice but declined to file civil-rights charges, and that the community felt that the killing of Cann was a set-up since the Chief was considered to be one of the city leaders who was friendliest to local Chicanos.

== Investigation and prosecution ==
The murder of Chief Cann remained unsolved for over six years, at which time a man named Francisco Chavez offered to exchange information on the killing for a lighter sentence on a concealed weapons charge. Per Chavez, the killers were four ex-Brown Berets from San Jose who had initially hoped to kill Officer John Miner and Union City city manager William Zaner. Chavez was originally supposed to be the gunman but bowed out. The attack was planned by Ruben Vizcarra, and the shooter was Leonard Baca, with assistance from Angel Ramirez and Paul Mendoza, accomplices. Two were arrested in Texas, the other was already in prison at Leavenworth, Kansas. Ramirez, Mendoza, and Chavez testified against Vizcarra and Baca in exchange for the prosecution dropping charges against them. Vizcarra was acquitted at trial. Baca was convicted of second-degree murder. Already incarcerated by the state of New Mexico at the time of his conviction, Baca served time for the Cann killing from 1987 to 1990. He died of a drug overdose shortly after his release in 1990.

== See also ==
- List of assassinated American politicians
