= Union City, California =

City in California, United States

- City
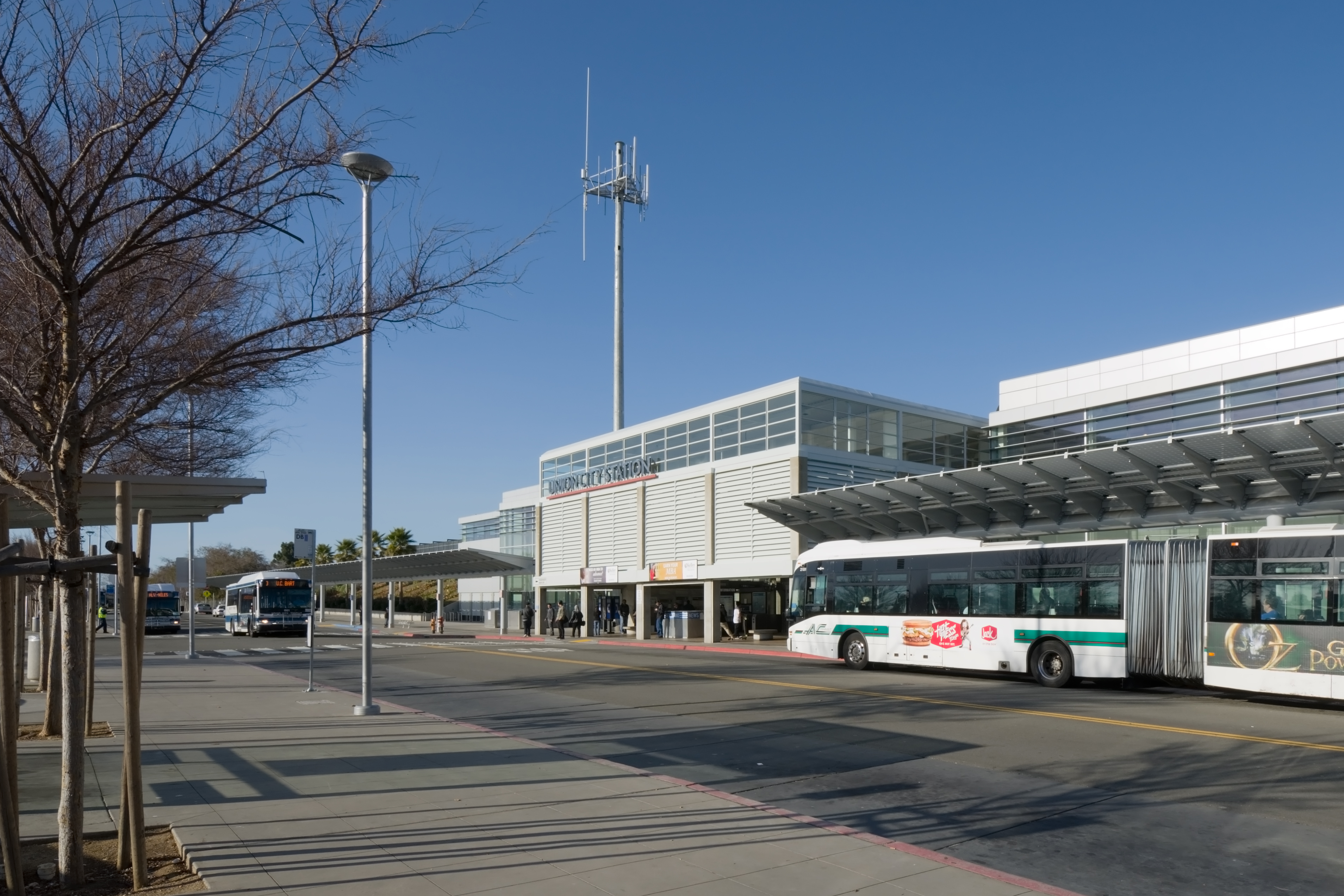
- Union City Bay Area Rapid Transit (BART) station

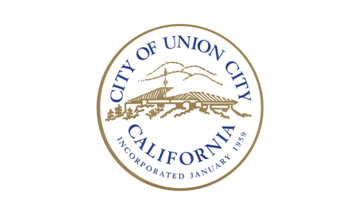
- Flag
- Interactive map of Union City, California
- Location in California Union City, California (the United States)
- Coordinates: 37°35′47″N 122°02′54″W
- Country: United States
- State: California
- County: Alameda
- Incorporated: January 26, 1959

Government
  - Mayor: Gary Singh
  - City Council: Jaime Patiño; Scott Sakakihara; Jeff Wang; Lance Nishihira

Area
  - Total: 19.18 sq mi (49.68 km^{2})
  - Land: 19.18 sq mi (49.68 km^{2})
  - Water: 0 sq mi (0.00 km^{2})

Population (2020)
  - Total: 70,143
  - Density: 3,657/sq mi (1,412/km^{2})
- Time zone: UTC-8 (PST)
  - Summer (DST): UTC-7 (PDT)
- ZIP code: 94587
- Area codes: 510, 341
- FIPS code: 06-81204
- Website: www.unioncityca.gov

Union City is a city in Alameda County, California, United States in the San Francisco Bay Area. The population in the 2020 census was 70,143, up from 69,628 in the 2010 census.

It is located approximately 19 miles (31 km) south of Oakland, 30 miles (48 km) from San Francisco, and 20 miles (32 km) north of San Jose.

It was incorporated in 1959, combining the communities of Alvarado and Decoto. Alvarado is a California Historical Landmark (#503). The city celebrated its 50th anniversary in 2009.

== Geography ==
According to the United States Census Bureau, the city has a total area of 19 square miles (49 km^{2}), all land with no bay frontage. The Niles Cone aquifer, managed by the Alameda County Water District, supplies much of the water consumed by Union City. Hayward bounds the city to the north and Fremont and Newark to the south. Union City, Newark and Fremont are known as the Tri-Cities.

== Demographics ==
Historical population
Census	Pop.	Note	%±
1960	6,618		—
1970	14,724		122.5%
1980	39,406		167.6%
1990	53,762		36.4%
2000	66,869		24.4%
2010	69,516		4.0%
2020	70,143		0.9%
U.S. Decennial Census; 1860–1870 1880-1890; 1900 1910 1920; 1930 1940 1950; 1960 1970 1980; 1990 2000 2010; 2020

=== Racial and ethnic composition ===
Union City, California – Racial and Ethnic Composition Note: the US Census treats Hispanic/Latino as an ethnic category. This table excludes Latinos from the racial categories and assigns them to a separate category. Hispanics/Latinos may be of any race.
Race / Ethnicity (NH = Non-Hispanic)	Pop 2000	Pop 2010	Pop 2020	% 2000	% 2010	% 2020
White alone (NH)	13,610	10,009	7,693	20.35%	14.40%	10.97%
Black or African American alone (NH)	4,321	4,194	3,006	6.46%	6.03%	4.29%
Native American or Alaska Native alone (NH)	132	116	113	0.20%	0.17%	0.16%
Asian alone (NH)	28,780	35,052	40,270	43.04%	50.42%	57.41%
Pacific Islander alone (NH)	577	839	774	0.86%	1.21%	1.10%
Other race alone (NH)	203	138	276	0.30%	0.20%	0.39%
Mixed race or Multiracial (NH)	3,226	3,273	2,931	4.82%	4.71%	4.18%
Hispanic or Latino (any race)	16,020	15,895	15,080	23.96%	22.87%	21.50%
Total	66,869	69,516	70,143	100.00%	100.00%	100.00%

=== 2020 census ===
As of the 2020 census, Union City had a population of 70,143. The median age was 39.6 years. 19.1% of residents were under the age of 18 and 16.9% of residents were 65 years of age or older. For every 100 females there were 99.1 males, and for every 100 females age 18 and over there were 96.8 males age 18 and over.

100.0% of residents lived in urban areas, while 0.0% lived in rural areas.

There were 21,432 households in Union City, of which 36.2% had children under the age of 18 living in them. Of all households, 60.6% were married-couple households, 13.8% were households with a male householder and no spouse or partner present, and 21.3% were households with a female householder and no spouse or partner present. About 14.2% of all households were made up of individuals and 6.3% had someone living alone who was 65 years of age or older.

There were 21,911 housing units, of which 2.2% were vacant. The homeowner vacancy rate was 0.5% and the rental vacancy rate was 3.0%.

=== Income and poverty ===
According to U.S. Census Bureau QuickFacts estimates, the median income for a household in the city is $142,374. Males have a median household income of $59,274 versus $40,625 for females. The per capita income for the city was $31,411. About 4.5% of the population were below the poverty line, including 5.9% of those under age 18 and 6.2% of those age 65 or over.

== History ==
Costanoans ("coastal peoples") were the first inhabitants, primarily the Ohlone peoples living alongside the Alameda and Dry Creeks. Shell mounds along the sloughs of Alameda Creek near the Alvarado sugar mill contained burial sites.

The first non-native community was founded in 1850 by John and William Horner, who named it "Union City" after their Sacramento River Steamship, "The Union". In 1854, it merged with the nearby community of New Haven (founded 1851) to form the town of Alvarado, named after a former Mexican governor, Juan Bautista Alvarado. Alvarado was the first county seat of Alameda County, a designation it lost in 1865 to San Leandro. Further east, Decoto was founded in 1870 as a railroad hub, hosting the first transcontinental railroad. Alvarado-Niles Road, one of the city's largest streets, connects the historical Fremont district of Niles with the historical Union City district of Alvarado.

The California Beet Sugar Company, the US' first successful sugar beet mill, was located in Alvarado and began operations in 1870. The plant was demolished in 1977.

Union City is a former railroad and steel town with an extensive industrial heritage. The Pacific States Steel Company occupied the land behind Union City Station that is redeveloping into the Union City Station District Downtown. The Alvarado and Decoto neighborhoods were both former railroad hubs and active railroad lines bisect both East End and the West Side of town. Trains are a way of life in Union City and natives are accustomed to waiting for Amtrak and freight trains to cross while commuting.

In the 1950s, Alvarado and Decoto – the latter making up the eastern side of the town – were annexation targets of the nearby communities of Newark, Hayward, and what would become Fremont. On January 13, 1959, they decided to incorporate into a single city, and named it after the Horners' original settlement, Union City. Tom Kitayama served as the city's first mayor in 1959 and was involved in Union City politics until his 1991 retirement. The population grew from 6,000 in 1959 to 70,000 in 2020. In 2016, Union City started to rebrand and unveiled a new city seal. Union City opened a new Teen Center in 2018. In March 2025, the city of Union City rolled out new city branded color coded trash carts with Republic Services and local Tri-CED community recycling to meet state and local goals.

== Economy ==
Union City is the location of the American Licorice Company's West Coast operations, which moved there in 1971.

Union City is home to three major health care providers: a Kaiser Permanente facility, the Tiburcio Vasquez Health Center, and Washington Hospital's Nakamura Clinic.

Union City hosts industrial and shipping companies, including R&S Manufacturing, RCD Concrete, Jatco, and EntirelyPets.

=== Shopping ===
Union Landing Shopping Center is a 100-acre (40 ha) shopping center, adjacent to Interstate 880. It is one of the largest centers in the city and supports about 70 stores. The mall was completed in 1999. The land was previously a drive-in movie park.

A Target shopping center sits near the Hayward/Union City border.

=== Employers ===
According to Union City's June 2019 Comprehensive Annual Financial Report, the top employers in the city were:

#	Employer	# of Employees
1	New Haven Unified School District	1,196
2	Southern Wine & Spirits	600
3	Walmart	534
4	Masonic Home For Adults	498
5	Abaxis	400
6	Mizuho OSI	400
7	Sterling Foods	400
8	City of Union City	313
9	Emerald Packaging	245
10	American Licorice	239

== Education ==
In 2014 New Haven Unified School District enrolls 10,000 students from Union City and Hayward. The district consists of seven (K-5) elementary schools (Alvarado Elementary, Delaine Eastine Elementary, Hillview Crest Elementary, Tom Kitayama Elementary, Pioneer Elementary, and Searles Elementary), two (6–8) middle schools (César Chávez Middle, and Itliong-Vera Cruz Middle School), and two high schools (James Logan High School and Conley-Caraballo High School). Lastly one adult/K-12 independent study school program is available. In December 2015, New Haven Unified School District renamed Alvarado Middle School to Itliong-Vera Cruz Middle School in honor of Philip Vera Cruz and Larry Itliong. The school district added solar power at school sites to cut energy costs.

New Haven Unified School District's first teacher strike came in 2019.

Union City lies within the Ohlone Community College District and Chabot-Las Positas Community College District.

== Transport ==
Several transit systems serve Union City, including AC Transit, the Dumbarton Express, Bay Area Rapid Transit (BART), and Union City Transit. The latter started in 1974 and runs 6 bus lines throughout Union City and parts of Hayward.

BART came to Union City when the system opened in 1972. In 2007 the Union City BART station was rebuilt and developed into Union City Intermodal Transit Station.

Union City is served by a network of high-capacity streets, with four exits on Interstate 880 (Nimitz Freeway). Highway 238 also serves the city (Mission Boulevard). Quarry Lakes Parkway, formerly known as the East–West Connector, is a 3-mile (4.8 km) roadway project that connects Mission Boulevard and Paseo Padre Parkway.

== Station district ==
Union City invested $100 million into an expansion of the downtown district, including development surrounding the BART station, which links BART with rail services: Capitol Corridor, Dumbarton Rail Corridor and Altamont Corridor Express (ACE). Construction has started on 800 mixed units east of BART station known as station east near Decoto Road.

== Government ==
Union City runs a council–manager government. The City Council consists of five representatives on a part-time basis. On November 3, 2020, the city switched from citywide elections to districts. The Mayor is elected at large. As of October 2025 the elected officials were: Gary Singh mayor, Lance Nishihira, Jaime Patiño, Jeff Wang, and Scott Sakakihara. The mayor and elected council members serve a 4-year term, with a 3-term limit. A utility tax was passed in November 2020.

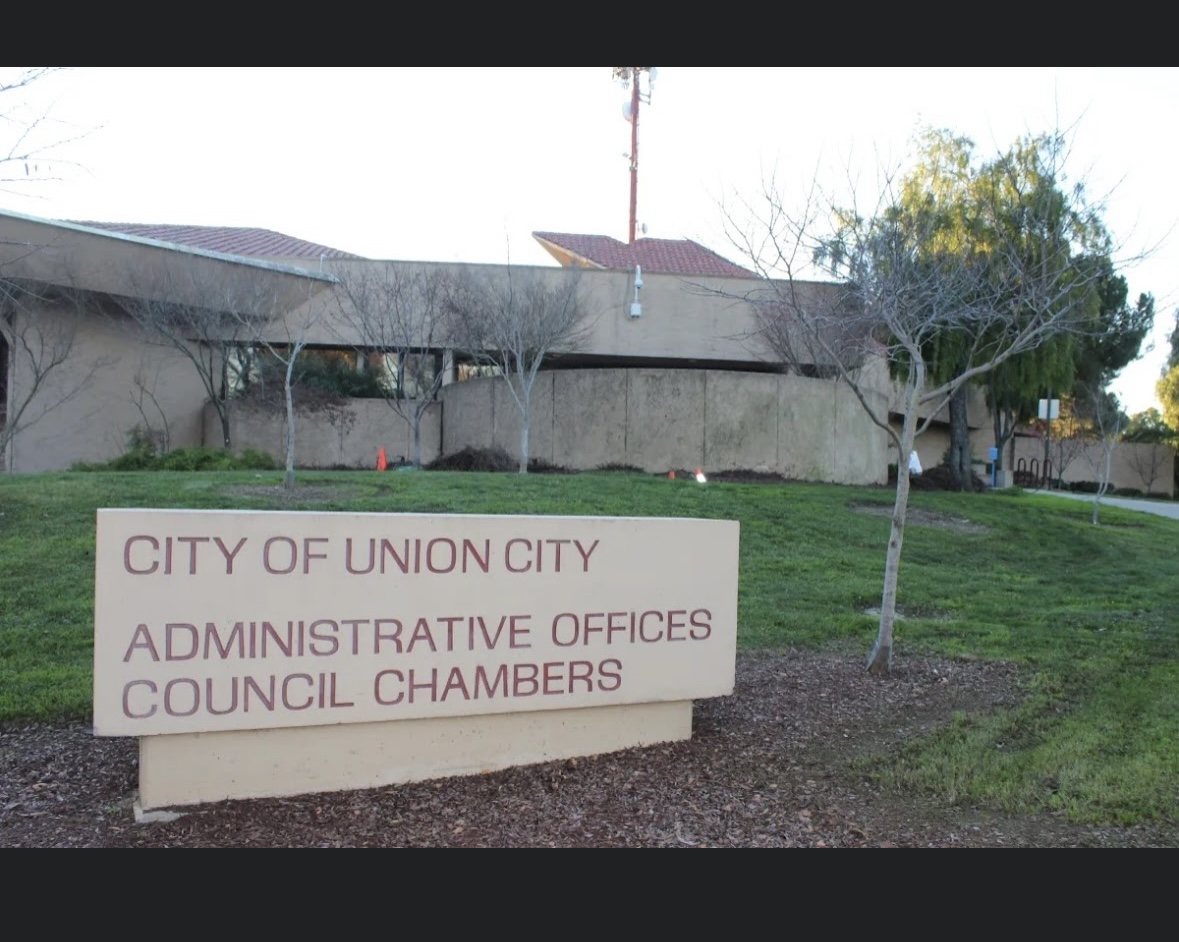

=== Politics ===
In 2017, Union City had 35,857 registered voters with 19,644 (54.8%) registered as Democrats, 4,200 (11.7%) registered as Republicans, and 10,693 (29.8%) registered as decline to state voters.

== Media ==
The monthly East Bay Echo and bi-weekly Tri-City Voice newspapers offer local news. Union City Patch served the community and is part of Patch.com.

== Culture ==
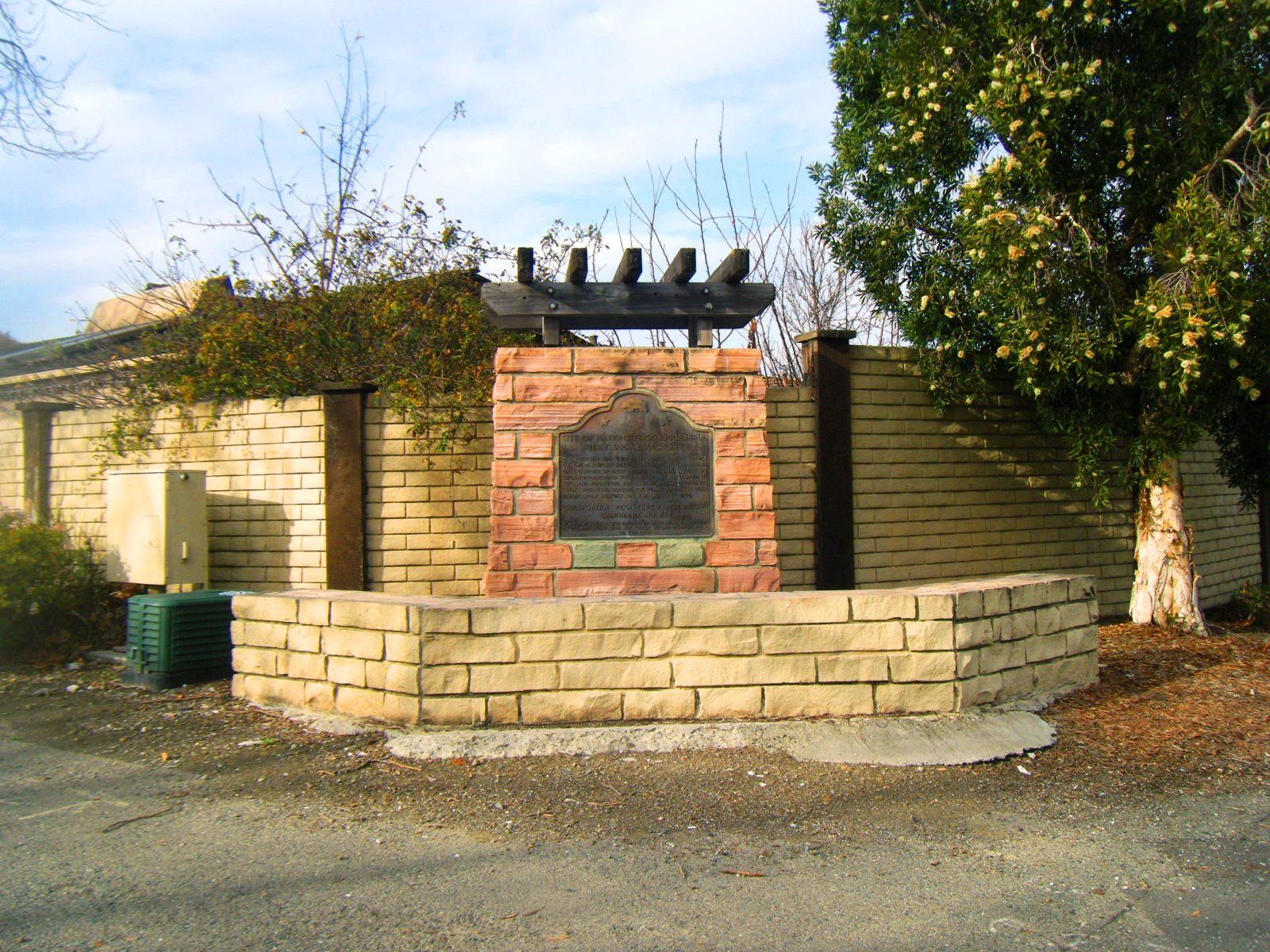
CHL 768: marking the first sugar beet factory in the U.S. (2009)

The first sugar beet factory in the United States was located in Union City, called the California Beet Sugar Company. It is noted by a California Historical Landmark #768, situated at Dyer and Ratekin.

Bay Area Flight 93 Memorial is in Sugar Mill Landing Park. It was the first monument completed in the United States designed to honor the passengers and crew of United Airlines Flight 93, which was bound for San Francisco, but was hijacked and crashed in rural Pennsylvania on September 11, 2001. The memorial consists of 40 large granite stones dedicated to the passengers of Flight 93. Sugar Mill Landing Park is essentially a small strip of grass on Dyer Street.

=== Courthouse ===
First Alameda County Courthouse
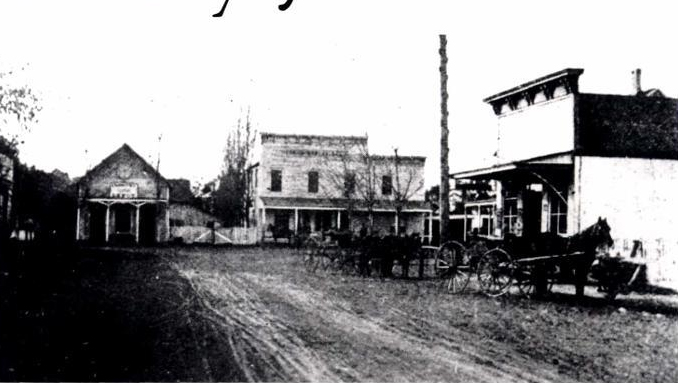
- The center two-story building is the original Alameda County courthouse, in the old town of Alvarado, 1853–1865.
- Interactive map of First Alameda County Courthouse
- 37.596667°N 122.0811°W
- Location: 30977 Union City Blvd., Union City, California

California Historical Landmark
- Reference no.: 503

Alameda County's first courthouse was located in Alvarado, starting on June 6, 1853. The original courthouse was a two-story wooden building that was originally a mercantile that included a post office. It was built by A. M. Church and Henry C. Smith. In 1865 the county seat moved to San Leandro. With the widening of Union City Blvd., the original site was paved over. The site is listed on the California Historical Landmarks list.

=== Masonic Home ===
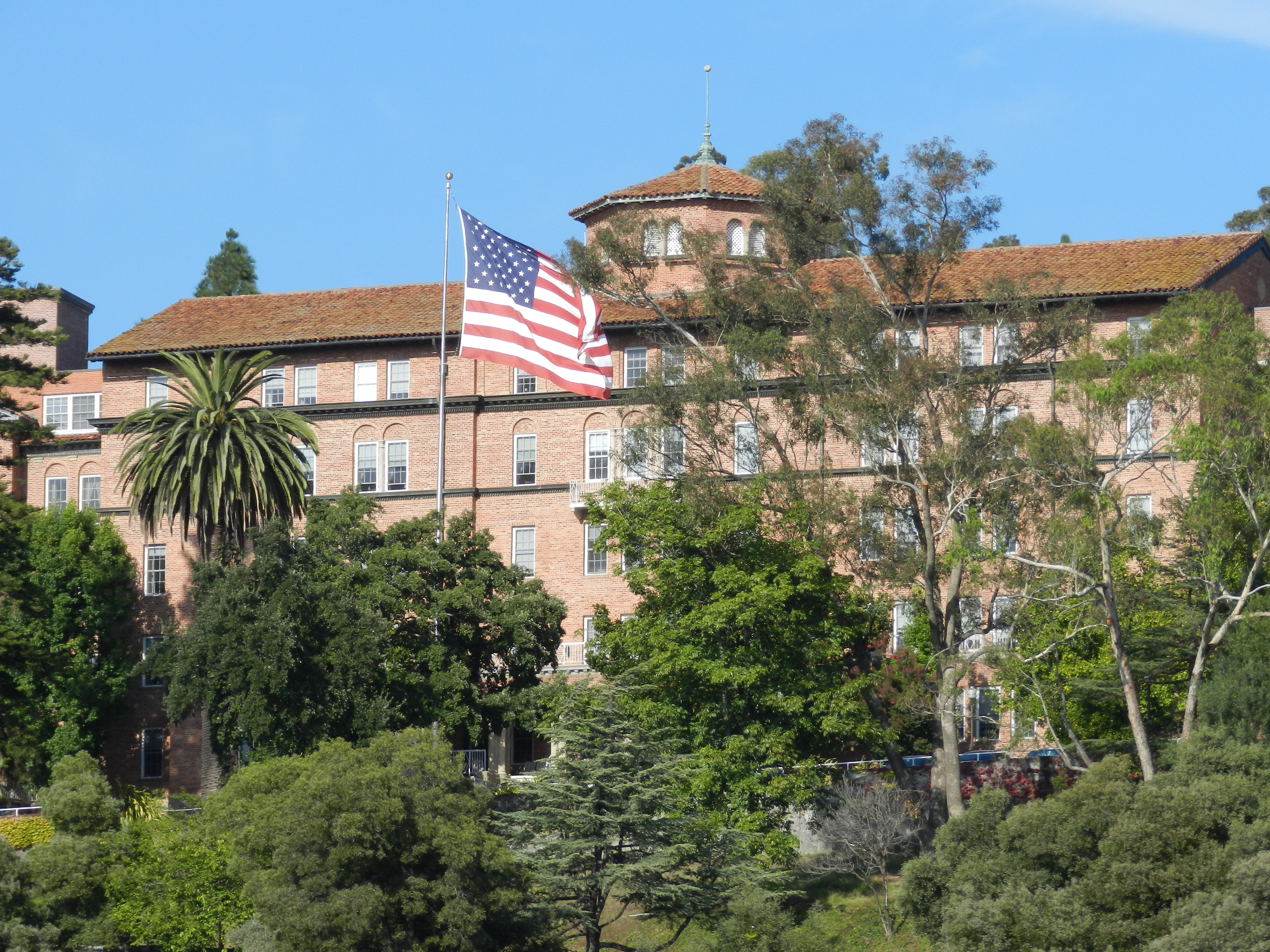
Masonic Home administration building; original central part constructed in 1898

Masonic Home at Union City, a senior living community for Freemasons and their spouses, has as its centerpiece a large brick administration building. The administration building was identified as a significant historic property in the 1974 Historic Resource Inventory of Washington Township. Interior features include a main staircase with stained glass windows, a parlor filled with antiques, and paintings of fourteen Masonic US presidents. The original five-story brick building formed the center of the Administration Building. It was constructed in 1898 and was the Masonic Widows and Orphans Home overlooking Decoto. The north and south wings of the Administration Building were added in 1914 and 1928, respectively. Ten more buildings were built on this 305-acre (1.2 km^{2}) campus, including Acacia Creek, a continuing care retirement community for all seniors, both Masons and non-Masons, completed in 2010.

== Climate ==
Climate data for Union City, California
Month	Jan	Feb	Mar	Apr	May	Jun	Jul	Aug	Sep	Oct	Nov	Dec	Year
Mean daily maximum °F (°C)	58 (14)	62 (17)	65 (18)	67 (19)	71 (22)	75 (24)	77 (25)	77 (25)	77 (25)	73 (23)	64 (18)	58 (14)	69 (20)
Mean daily minimum °F (°C)	42 (6)	45 (7)	48 (9)	50 (10)	53 (12)	56 (13)	58 (14)	59 (15)	57 (14)	54 (12)	48 (9)	42 (6)	51 (11)
Average precipitation inches (mm)	2.95 (75)	3.02 (77)	2.34 (59)	1.02 (26)	0.48 (12)	0.11 (2.8)	0 (0)	0.03 (0.76)	0.17 (4.3)	0.81 (21)	1.70 (43)	2.56 (65)	15.19 (386)
Source: The Weather Channel

== Sister cities ==
Union City's sister cities are:

- Asadabad, Afghanistan
- Baybay, Philippines
- Chiang Rai, Thailand
- Jalandhar, India
- Liyang, China
- Mulegé, Mexico
- Pasay, Philippines

== Notable people ==
- Stephen Abas - Olympic silver medalist in freestyle wrestling
- Otis Amey - Professional football player
- Joey Bragg - Actor, comedian, formerly on Disney Channel television series Liv and Maddie
- Angelina Camarillo - Former pop singer, also associated with NB Ridaz
- Vicky Galindo - U.S. softball player
- Eddie House - Professional basketball player
- Aaron Ledesma - Former Major League Baseball player
- Darren Lewis - Former Major League Baseball player
- Raaginder - Musician and violinist
- SuChin Pak - MTV VJ
- Kelli White - Sprinter
- Roy Williams - Professional football player
- Avantika Vandanapu - Actress

== See also ==
- Assassination of William Cann
