= California Beet Sugar Company =

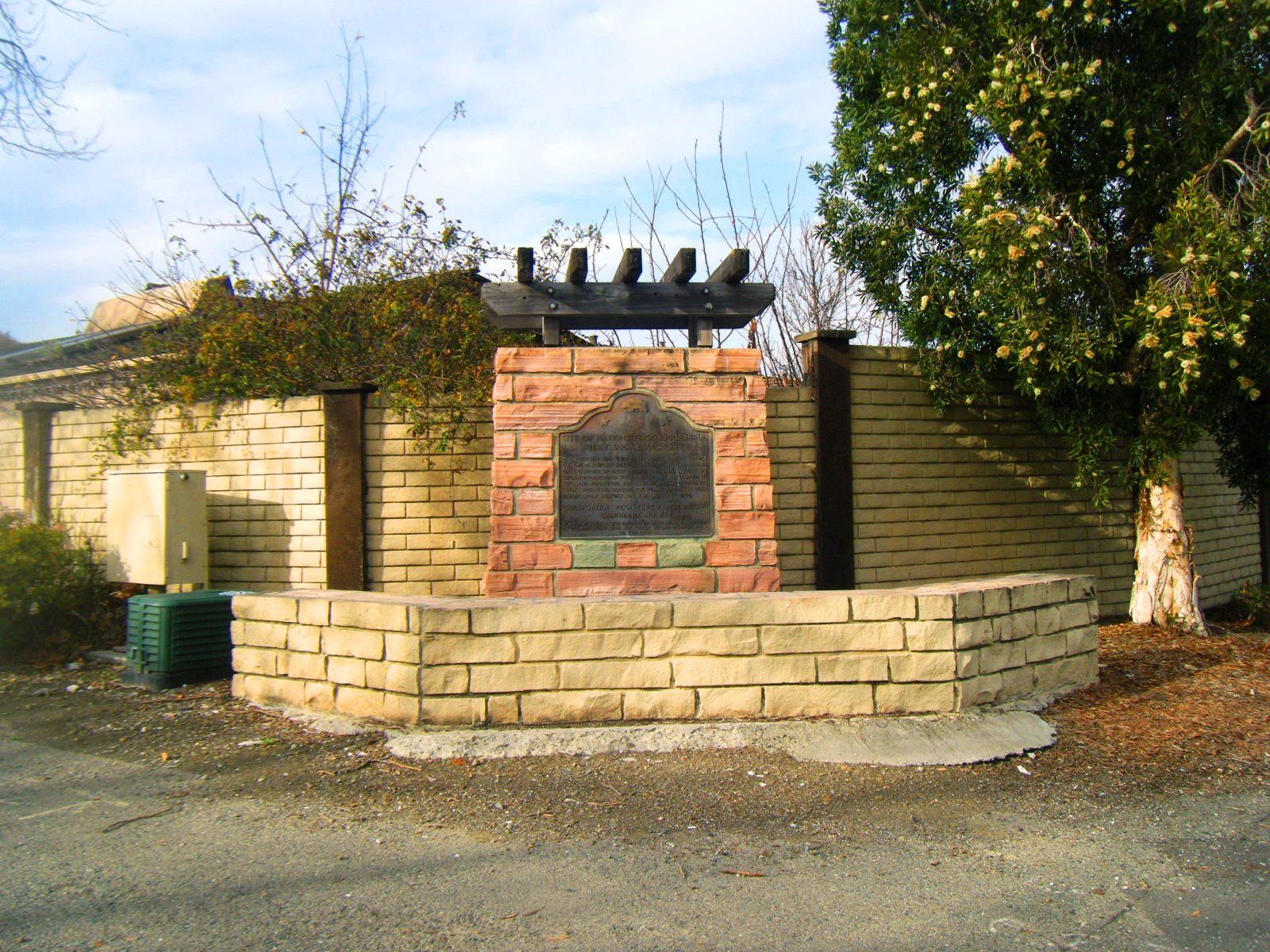
- Interactive map of California Beet Sugar Company
- 37.600533°N 122.070517°W
- Location: 30849 Dyer St., Union City, California

History
- Built: 1870

Site notes
- Architect: B.F. Ingalls

California Historical Landmark
- Official name: Site of the nation's first successful beet sugar factory
- Reference no.: 768

The California Beet Sugar Company was the first successful sugar beet factory in the United States. It was located in Alvarado, California (now part of Union City) and operated from 1870 to 1873. Although the company shut down after only three years, the company's owners would go on to found a number of other factories in the Sacramento Valley, in Santa Cruz County, and in the Alvarado area itself. The latter location would host a series of sugar refineries that would continue to be active in the area until the closure of Holly Sugar's Union City plant in 1975. The site of the former factory is today marked by a California Historical Landmark.

== History ==
The sugar factory was started in 1870 by E. H. Dyer, his brother Ephraim Dyer, C.I. Hutchinson, who served as president, W.F. Garratt, B.P. Flint, T.G. Phelps, W.B. Carr, E.R. Carpenter, and E.G. Rollins. The factory was built on farmland owned by Dyer. B.F. Ingalls served as the architect and builder. The factory opened officially on November 15, 1870. The machines used in the factory were imported from Germany. The building was located along the Alameda Creek, for transportation purposes, since there weren't any railroads. Sugar was distributed via a wheel steamer named "The Rosa," to San Francisco from the factory. In the first year of production it processed 293 tons of beet sugar. In 1873 the factory closed due to financial reasons.

The partnership split, two of Dyer's partners, Andreas Otto and Ewald Klineau, who took ownership of the factories machinery, made the decision to move the factory 100 miles away to Santa Cruz County, where Claus Spreckels had been experimening with sugar beet cultivation on his Aptos estate. In 1874, they set up a new business Soquel Beet Root Sugar Company (which would also continue to use the name California Beet Sugar Company) at Soquel Landing (now Capitola, California). Sugar beet cultivation was not ultimately successful in the farmland close to Capitola, but was successful in the Pajaro Valley, in the southern part of the county. This necessated transport of the majority of the factory's sugar beet supply by railway and transportation costs proved high. The Soquel factory would operate for the last time during the harvest season of 1879. Afterward, the company would go bankrupt and eventually auction off its equipment in 1884. Ironically, much of the factory equipment was purchased by the newly reestablished sugar beet factory in Alvarado.

After the 1873 failure of the Alvarado factory, Dyer relocated to the Central Valley and purchased the Sacramento Beet Sugar Company, which was ultimately unsuccessful as well. Undeterred, Dyer then returned to Alvarado property, still in his possession, and there built a new factory in 1879. The company was called the Standard Sugar Manufacturing Company, but reorganized as Pacific Coast Sugar Company in 1886. In 1889, Dyer sold the business, and it was reorganized as the Alameda Sugar Company. In 1920, Alameda Sugar Company acquired the Pacific Sugar Corporation and its sugar refinery in Tracy, California. In 1926, the Alameda Sugar Company was purchased by Holly Sugar Corporation. Holly would continue to refine sugar in Union City until the plant closed in 1975. The factory was demolished in 1977.

== Legacy ==
The former site of the Alvarado factory is commemorated with a California Historical Landmarks. Dyer Street in Union City was named in honor of E. H. Dyer.

The Soquel factory would be the first attempt to produce beet sugar in the Central Coast region of California, which was ultimately an unsuccessful undertaking due to high transportation and labor costs. However, beginning in the late 1880s, Claus Spreckels would go on to spur large-scale sugar beet cultivation in the Pajaro and Salinas Valleys, opening a series of highly-profitable refineries in those locations, notably the Spreckels Sugar Company, which would continue producing sugar in the Salinas Valley until 1982.

The Tracy sugar refinery would continue to operate as a Holly Sugar and later Spreckels Sugar factory until 2000 and as a distribution center for the latter company until its final closure in 2009.
