= 1971 L.A. federal building bombing =

Fatal explosion in California

Coordinates: 34.054°N 118.240°W

Investigators collect evidence from the site of the explosion

On January 28, 1971, at 4:30 p.m. PST, an explosion in the second-floor men's room of the 300 North Los Angeles Street federal building in California, United States, killed 18-year-old employee Tomas Ortiz, a resident of City Terrace. Ortiz was a student at L.A. Trade Tech, and a part-time employee of the General Services Administration, assigned to the Internal Revenue Service. News accounts variously described him as a "janitor" and a "mail orderly."

Ortiz's right leg was blown off below the knee, and his left leg was partially severed. He also suffered "severe head injuries," and died en route to the hospital. The coroner declared his cause of death was a combination of skull fractures, brain lacerations, and blood loss from the leg injuries.

The bomb ripped a 4-by-5-foot (1.2 by 1.5 m) hole through the wall. The blast was powerful enough to shatter the washbasins in the bathroom and damage the washrooms on the floors above and below the bomb site. Water lines and electric circuits were also broken.

The morning after the explosion, the Los Angeles Times reported, "An investigation was underway to see if Ortiz was involved in placing the bomb in the building. The federal building has been under tight security for several months because of a series of bombings of public buildings. Guards use metal detectors at the entrances, and packages are searched." However, people not carrying packages were not searched, and a second and third entrance had little or no security controls. On Sunday, law enforcement told the L.A. Times that there was no obvious "militancy" in Ortiz's background and "absolutely no evidence" that he was involved in planting the bomb.

In April 1971, Los Angeles Mayor Sam Yorty suggested that there was a connection between the federal building bomb and a Chicano Moratorium march that had occurred the same weekend. At the time of the 1974 LAX bombing it was noted that the FBI had not identified any suspects in the 1971 federal building bombing and the case remained open.

Historians generally attribute the bombing to the Chicano Liberation Front, which claimed responsibility for a series of bombings in the Los Angeles area in 1970 and 1971. Ortiz's death was described as "obviously accidental" in the Los Angeles Free Press in 1971 and "accidental and unintended" in a 2000 review of patterns in American domestic terrorism. The CLF never claimed responsibility for nor commented upon the federal building bomb; if it was CLF, Ortiz was the only fatality—indeed the only casualty of any kind—as a consequence of their bombing spree.

Tomas "Tommy" Ortiz was born September 17, 1952, in El Paso, Texas. He lived with his parents on Volney Drive, and was a graduate of Roosevelt High School. He was buried at Rose Hills Memorial Park in Whittier, California.
