= Killing of Guillermo Sanchez and Guillardo Sanchez =

1970 LAPD "mistake shooting" in U.S.

The deaths of Guillermo Sanchez and Gildardo Sanchez occurred on July 16, 1970, when the Los Angeles Police Department raided their apartment at 826 E. 7th St. in downtown Los Angeles in the U.S. state of California. The cousins were both shot and killed during the raid. Guillermo Beltran Sanchez was 22 years old, Gildardo Alcazar Sanchez was 21. The incident was dubbed the mistake shooting by the newspapers. Journalist Ruben Salazar, who would himself be killed by an L.A. County sheriff's deputy in August 1970, featured interviews with survivors of the raid on KMEX. The following year the militant Chicano Liberation Front claimed responsibility for bombing Los Angeles City Hall with a telephone message that stated that the bomb was "in memory of the Sanchez brothers."

Guillermo Sanchez was allegedly killed first, and almost immediately, by LAPD Sgt. Marshall F. Gaines, who kicked down the door and fired. Gildardo Sanchez was killed by a "fusillade" of almost 20 buckshot pellets fired by LAPD officer Jeffrey J. Fedrizzi, LAPD officer Hector R. Zapeda, and San Leandro PD officer William Kinsella. Both Gildardo Sanchez, and another man, Angel Michael Barteleno, saw fit to jump out the second-story window to escape the gunfire. Barteleno broke his leg in the fall. Sanchez lay beside him in a pool of blood, dead or dying. A fourth man, Ramon Sanchez, sprained an ankle while jumping for his life.

The cops were allegedly looking for a murder suspect from San Leandro, California, Daniel Gorostiza, who was unknown to the six men in the apartment that night. Gorostzia, wanted for question in the murder of his ex-girlfriend, surrendered to police the day after the Sanchez cousins were killed. The day after that he was released from jail and the charges were dropped due to faltering evidence.

The district attorney filed criminal charges against the officers involved in the shooting, but they were dismissed by a judge. In March 1971, a federal grand jury indicted the officers on charges of civil-rights violations. The grand jury simultaneously handed down indictments against an officer who compelled a woman of Chinese ancestry to disrobe in his patrol car, and against officers accused of conspiring to steal evidence from one location to plant it at another. At issue was if the Mexican nationals in the apartment, most or all of whom were illegal immigrants, had legal standing for a civil-rights case. The officers were later acquitted.

== See also ==
- Police brutality in the United States
- History of the Los Angeles Police Department
- Chicano Moratorium
- Murder of Santos Rodriguez
- Illegal immigration to the United States
