= Union Landing Shopping Center =

Outdoor Mall in Union City, California

Coordinates: 37.6013°N 122.0664°W

Union Landing Shopping Center is an open-air shopping mall in Union City, California, with over 70 stores, restaurants, entertainment, hotels, and services. This is a 1,000,000 square-foot lifestyle center and is the largest shopping center in Union City. The majority of this area was occupied by Union City Drive-In Theater between 1966 and 1998. The mall was completed in 1999 after several years of debate on the land.
