= Angelina (American singer) =

American singer (born 1976)

- Born: Angelina Camarillo; 1976 (age 49–50); Union City, California, U.S.
- Origin: Union City, California, U.S.
- Genres: Freestyle, dance-pop, Latin pop
- Occupations: Singer, songwriter, teacher
- Years active: 1996–2009
- Label: Upstairs Records
- Formerly of: NB Ridaz

Angelina Camarillo Ramos (born 1976) is an American singer from Union City, California. Angelina is best known for her 1996 hit song "Release Me", which reached No. 52 on the Billboard Hot 100. Her other Hot 100 chart peaks include "I Don't Need Your Love" (#69), "Without Your Love" (#82), and "The Tide Is High" (#89) in addition to her single "Mambo" peaking at #2 on the Billboard Bubbling Under Hot 100.

After her brother Daniel was killed in 2006, Angelina stopped writing songs. She still toured on the dance music circuit for a while after that, eventually leaving the entertainment industry altogether to become a schoolteacher in East San Jose.

Her brother, Daniel Camarillo, has a memorial in his name at the Charles F. Kennedy Park in their hometown of Union City, California.

== Discography ==
Year	Album	Chart position
Year	Album	EUA Top Heat
1996	The Album: Released: 29 October 1996; Label: Upstairs Records	45
1999	Ven a Mi (Come to Me): Released: 13 July 1999; Label: Upstairs Records	—
2002	Love Ain't Here No More: Released: 11 November 2002; Label: Upstairs Records	—
