= La Casa de Carnalismo =

Leftist Mexican-American activist group

Casa Carnalismo
- La Casa de Carnalismo
- Formation: 1969; 57 years ago
- Legal status: Community organization
- Location: East Los Angeles, California, USA
- Services: Immigration counseling

La Casa de Carnalismo or Casa Carnalismo (the House of Brotherhood) was a militant Chicano community group in East Los Angeles in the U.S. state of California that was organized in spring 1969. According to one account, the group's leadership found that "the heavy flow of heroin and seconals into the barrio was an obstacle to consciousness-raising and organized political action." Three members of the group, Rodolfo Sanchez, Juan Fernandez and Alberto Ortiz, all in their early 20s, were charged with shooting and robbing a drug dealer (who was in fact an undercover federal agent) at the Estrada Courts housing project in July 1970. The agent of the U.S. Bureau of Narcotics and Dangerous Drugs, Robert E. Canales, was paralyzed from the waist down in the shooting. They were charged and sentenced in federal court to 40 years, 25 years, and 10 years, respectively, for "conspiring to assault and rob a federal agent of federal monies." Leftists thought it was a "frame-up," and they became known as the Carnalismo Three, or Los Tres.

In 1971, Bureau of Alcohol, Tobacco, Firearms and Explosives (ATF) agents asked a paid police informant named Eustacio "Frank" Martinez to infiltrate Carnalismo, which the ATF believed was the "overground name" for the Chicano Liberation Front. Martinez found that main preoccupation of La Casa de Carnalisimo staffers was immigration counseling and that he saw no connection to CLF.
