= Cesar Chavez Convocation =

The Cesar Chavez Convocation was an annual event at the University of California, Santa Cruz (UCSC) during the month of May, commemorating Cesar Chavez and his legacy. Keynote speakers were invited to partake in the convocation to honor Cesar Chavez by relating social justice issues to the Hispanic and Latino community on campus. The convocation aimed to create a space where students could have dialogue about engaging with social justice issues and leadership. This annual event was organized largely by the Chicanx/Latinx Resource Center, also known as El Centro, and students of UC Santa Cruz. The event was open to the Santa Cruz community and was free of charge. The 16th annual convocation took place in 2019, with a focus on community organization. In 2020, the event was renamed to Nuestras Raíces: The Art of Community Empowerment.

== Rosie Cabrera and Jose Olivas ==
Rosie Cabrera, director of the Chicano Latino Resource Center, and Jose Olivas, a MECHA member, worked together to organize the Cesar Chavez Convocation. Jose was an undergraduate student at UCSC who was impacted by the death of Cesar Chavez. For this reason Jose sought for the campus to commemorate Cesar Chavez, at first by naming College 8 a college within University of California, Santa Cruz after Cesar. But this idea was minimized due to the lack of funding and donors. The partnership then began when Jose approached Rosie and proposed this idea that focused on how Chicano Latino people on campus can come together in a space characterized by leadership and social justice. At this point they already had a model from the Martin Luther King convocation, however, the essence for the Cesar Chavez Convocation would be different due to the different histories. When Rosie worked at Education Opportunity Program (EOP)at UCSC she noticed existing traditions already established, she comes from that sensibility and understanding that community is built by establishing traditions. To further enhance the envisioned Cesar Chavez Convocation she added the insight in community building. Coming together as one in order to celebrate and commemorate not just Cesar Chavez but also one another. Her sentiments were to see if this was viable if it is viable then it is a partnership that can be built.

== Convocations ==
=== First Annual ===
The first Cesar Chavez Convocation took place on May 14, 2004 at UC Santa Cruz. Students, faculty and staff gathered collectively in order to celebrate the life and work of Cesar Chavez. The guest invited to participate as the keynote speaker was the co-founder of the United Farm Workers (UFW), Dolores Huerta. The convocation sought to educate the community about the farm workers movement and the struggles they faced alongside Cesar Chavez. In addition there was discussion about the contemporary struggles, at that time, faced by farm works. During the convocation the film Struggles in the Fields, was shown.

=== Second Annual ===
The second annual Cesar Chavez Convocation occurred on May 16, 2005. The keynote speaker that participated in the convocation was the artist, director and founder of El Teatro Campesino, Luis Valdez. Through the framework of Luis Valdez accomplishments the convocation sought to honor Cesar Chavez’s life work. The second annual Cesar Chavez Convocation sought to continue a theme of Social Justice.

=== Third Annual ===
The third annual Cesar Chavez Convocation was held on May 11, 2006. The keynote speaker who partook in this convocation was Arturo Rodriguez, second president of the United Farm Workers.

=== Fourth Annual ===
On May 16, 2007 the fourth annual Cesar Chavez Convocation was held at UC Santa Cruz. There was a slight change in the focus of the keynote speaker for this convocation. The move was from the United Farm Workers issues to social justice issues and organizing. The keynote speaker for the convocation was Maria Elena Durazo, a noted labor leader in the Los Angeles County. In addition this event celebrated the inauguration of the new UC Santa Cruz Center for Labor Studies.

=== Fifth Annual ===
The fifth annual Cesar Chavez Convocation deviated slightly from the prior years in terms of structure and intent. On May 14, 2008 keynote speaker Guillermo Gomez-Peña performed a piece called Mexorcist. Guillermo Gomez-Peña used political satire in order to address the issue of racialization around “raza.” As part of the convocation a town hall was called upon in order to create a space in which people could express the way they felt. Pena expresses his opinion on immigration issues in the following article.

(1) the problem isn't immigration but immigration hysteria

=== Sixth Annual ===
The sixth annual Cesar Chavez Convocation was celebrated on May 14, 2009. The keynote speaker who participated was Kent Wong, director of the UCLA Center for Labor Research and Education and professor of Asian American Studies. At this time the issue around the DREAM Act was highly contested. In contrast to previous years, the essence of this convocation changed slightly. By bringing in the best person to talk about the issue it offered El Centro the opportunity to collaborate on with the Asian American Pacific Islander resource center. Furthermore, it acknowledged that the DREAM Act and being undocumented is not only a Latino issue.

=== Seventh Annual ===
The seventh annual Cesar Chavez Convocation was celebrated on May 20, 2010 with keynote speaker Maria Hinojosa. Maria Hinojosa is the Senior Correspondent for the broadcast news magazine NOW on PBS.

=== Eighth Annual ===
The eighth annual Cesar Chavez Convocation occurred on May 25, 2011 with keynote speaker Rev. Gregory Boyle. Rev. Gregory Boyle is the founder of Homeboy Industries the program offers alternatives to gang violence. During the convocation Rev. Gregory Boyle discussed the role and impact of gangs on Latinos and other youth of color.

=== Ninth Annual ===
The ninth annual Cesar Chavez Convocation was held on May 16, 2012 with keynote speaker Jose Antonio Vargas, Pulitzer Prize–winning journalist, and founder of DefineAmerican.com and undocumented Immigrant. Jose Antonio Vargas shared with the Santa Cruz community his experience about being an undocumented immigrant and the challenges he faced when pursuing his America dream.

=== Tenth Annual ===
The tenth annual Cesar Chavez Convocation was celebrated on May 7, 2013 with keynote speaker Dolores Huerta, co-founder of the UFW. Dolores Huerta delivered an inspirational speech weaving a thread through the contemporary social issues. Some of the issues discussed were inequity of the education system, the power of organizing, and the prison industrial complex.

=== Eleventh Annual ===
The eleventh annual Cesar Chavez Convocation was held on May 20, 2014, with keynote speaker Cesar Cruz.

=== Twelfth Annual ===
The twelfth annual Cesar Chavez Convocation was held on May 12, 2015, with keynote speaker Daniel "Nane" Alejandrez, executive director of Santa Cruz Barrios Unidos.

=== Thirteenth Annual ===
The thirteenth annual Cesar Chavez Convocation was held on May 18, 2016, with keynote speaker Carmen Perez, UCSC alumna and executive director of The Gathering for Justice.

=== Fourteenth Annual ===
The fourteenth annual Cesar Chavez Convocation was held on May 16, 2017, hosting Paul Ortiz, and shifting to an interactive panel style.

=== Fifteenth Annual ===
The fifteenth annual Cesar Chavez Convocation was held on May 16, 2018, hosting activists present in the 1968 L.A. Walkouts: Yolanda Rios, Margarita “Mita” Cuaron, Bobby Verdugo, Paula Crisostomo, and John Ortiz.

=== Sixteenth Annual ===
The sixteenth annual Cesar Chavez Convocation was held on May 14, 2019, with keynote speakers Judy de los Santos, political secretary of Union del Barrio, and Elias Gonzales, coordinator at MILPA.

=== Nuestras Raíces (2020) ===
The first Nuestras Raíces: The Art of Community Empowerment event was held on April 8, 2020, hosting the poets Alan Pelaez Lopez and Yesika Salgado.

=== Nuestras Raíces (2021) ===
The second Nuestras Raíces: The Art of Community Empowerment event was held on May 12, 2021, focusing on mutual aid, hosting Colectivo Revolunas and the Watsonville Campesino Appreciation Caravan.

== See also ==
- Chicano Movement
