= Chávez High School =

Chávez High School can refer to several schools in the United States:

- Chávez Huerta K-12 Preparatory Academy (Pueblo, Colorado)
- Chávez High School (Delano, California)
- Chávez High School (Houston)
- César Chávez High School (Phoenix, Arizona)
- Chávez High School (Santa Ana, California)
- Cesar Chavez High School (Stockton, California)
- César Chávez Learning Academies (San Fernando, California)
