= César Chávez Middle School =

César Chávez Middle School may refer to any one of a number of middle schools named after California union organizer César Chávez:

- César Chávez Academy, the elementary-middle school of the Chávez Huerta K-12 Preparatory Academy (Pueblo, Colorado)
- César Chávez Middle School, in the New Haven Unified School District, in Union City, California
- César Chávez Middle School (Lynwood, California)
- César Chávez Middle School (Oceanside, California)
- César Chávez Middle School (San Bernardino, California)
- César Chávez Middle School (Union City, California)
- César Chávez Middle School (Watsonville, California)
- César Chávez Middle School (Detroit, Michigan)
- César Chávez Middle School (Mission, Texas)
- César Chávez Middle School (Waco, Texas)
