= Cesar Cruz =

Mexican academic

Dr. César Cruz is the co-founder of a community based organization Homies Empowerment based out of Oakland, CA and former Dean of Secondary Schools Program at Harvard University. He was born in Guadalajara c. 1974, coming to the United States as an undocumented immigrant at age 9. Cruz holds a B.A. in history from UC Berkeley, and a doctorate in educational leadership from Harvard Graduate School of Education. Cruz's dissertation is titled: Letting Go of Clecha, While Holding Corazón; Developing a New Approach to Empowering Youth in Gangs the Homeboy Industries Way. Link: https://dash.harvard.edu/entities/publication/73120379-0cec-6bd4-e053-0100007fdf3b On May 1, 1992, Cruz was one of 65 people arrested marching on the San Francisco–Oakland Bay Bridge after the acquittal of officers charged with beating Rodney King. Cruz later learned that the southwestern parts of the U.S. are actually his ancestral homeland. He identifies as Mexica(n) with huichol roots. In 1995, Cruz was involved in a fifteen-day hunger strike at the University of California, Irvine. The 1995 strike was undertaken by Cruz and others from UC Berkeley and UC Irvine to protect and promote affirmative action at UC Irvine. Cruz was later part of a 26-day hunger strike in 2004, which resulted in Governor Arnold Schwarzenegger agreeing to refinance the West Contra Costa Unified School District's high interest loans. He was keynote speaker for the Cesar Chavez Convocation at UC Santa Cruz in 2014 and Hermanos Unidos National Conference at California State University, Fullerton in 2017. Research at Homeboy Industries, a job skills program in the Los Angeles area for gang members, served as his Harvard doctoral capstone work. Cruz was the first male Mexican-immigrant to earn a doctorate at Harvard's Education Leadership program.

Homies Empowerment operates a Freedom Farm, free food pantry and their very own high school, The Freedom School.

Cruz was awarded the Orange County Human Rights Award in 1995 and the Peacemaker of the Year award by the California State Senate in 2005. In 2011, he was awarded a local Jefferson Award for Public Service for his work with the Homies Empowerment program.

== Bibliography ==
- Preciado-Cruz, César A, Revenge of the Illegal Alien: A Mexican Takes on the Empire, 2008, Oakland: Making Changes Press, OCLC 259714147
- Preciado-Cruz, César A, Norteños/Sureños : time to 'bang' for freedom : a brief history of the conflict between the Mexican Mafia and Nuestra familia (2009) (alternate title Bang For Freedom; A Brief History of Mexican Mafia, Nuestra Familia and Latino Activism in the U.S. (2015)), Oakland: Making Changes Press, OCLC 810178174
- Voces: A Journal of Chicana/Latina Studies Vol. 2, No. 2, Special Poetry Issue (Summer 1999) Published by Mujeres Activas en Letras y Cambio Social (MALCS) JSTOR 23013237
