= Conley-Caraballo High School =

Public high school in California, United States

Location
- 541 Blanche Street; Hayward, California; United States; 37°36′52.89″N 122°1′41.48″W

Information
- Type: Public continuation high school
- Established: 2005
- School district: New Haven Unified School District
- Principal: Clare Zapata
- Teaching staff: 10.10 (FTE)
- Grades: 9–12
- Enrollment: 127 (2023–24)
- Student to teacher ratio: 12.57
- Colors: Black; Gold
- Mascot: Warrior
- Website: https://cchs.mynhusd.org/

Conley-Caraballo High School (CCHS), formerly El Rancho Verde High School, is a public 9-12 continuation high school in south Hayward, California, United States. It is part of the New Haven Unified School District (NHUSD), along with James Logan High School.

The school was named after Jean Conley (d. 1982) and Hector Caraballo (d. 2000). The campus opened in 2005 and was the first solar powered school in the district.

Enrollment is around 100 students, who live in Hayward and Union City.
