= Camino of Rancho San Antonio =

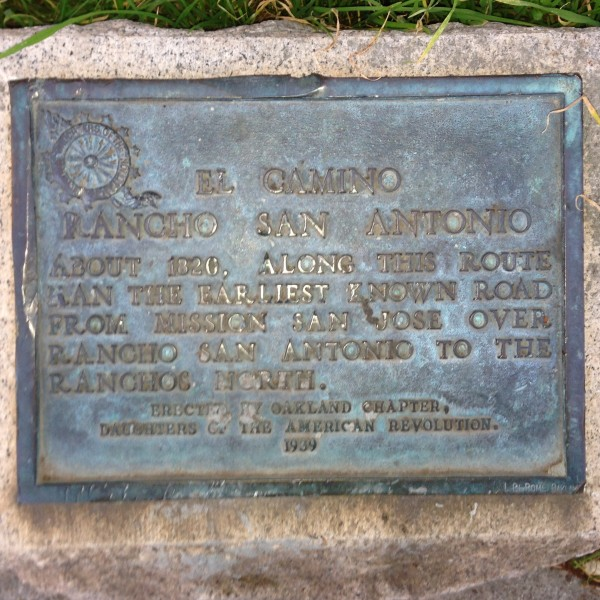

- Location in Oakland/East Bay
- 37.824444°N 122.258889°W
- Location: SW corner of Oakland and Santa Clara Aves. Oakland, California

California Historical Landmark
- Designated: March 22, 1939
- Reference no.: 299

The Camino of Rancho San Antonio is a former road that was located in Alameda County, California. The camino originally reached from Fruitvale to Mission San José. It eventually expanded to travel from the Temescal area of Oakland to San Pablo.

== History ==
The historical road transported users from Fruitvale to Mission San José. Eventually, it expanded further north through Oakland to the Temescal neighborhood, and the towns of San Leandro and San Lorenzo, and finally San Pablo.

A portion of the old camino was visible, as depressions left from wheels that once used the road, until 1870 around 60 Santa Clara Avenue in Oakland. A section of Santa Clara Avenue, near Grand Avenue to Harrison Street, travels along the camino route.

== Legacy ==
Camino of Rancho San Antonio is no longer a functioning road. It is listed on the California Historical Landmarks listing as #299.
