= Cesar Chavez Jacobo =

Dominican professional basketball player

Personal information
- Born: June 1, 1985 (age 41) Santo Domingo, Dominican Republic
- Listed height: 1.96 m (6 ft 5 in)
- Listed weight: 90 kg (198 lb)

Career information
- High school: Our Savior New American School (Centereach, New York)
- College: St. Thomas University (Florida) (2006–2009) FIU Panthers (2004-2006)
- Playing career: 2009–2017
- Position: Point guard

Career history
- 2009: Club Bameso
- 2010: BK Barons Kvartāls
- 2010–2011: CB Ferreterias San Isidro
- 2011–2012: Los Indios de San Francisco
- 2012–2013: Grupo Babel Perez Zeledon
- 2013–2024: Municipal Puente Alto
- 2014–2017: Academia de la Montaña Medellín, Colombia

Cesar Chavez Jacobo (born 1985 June 1), is a Dominican professional basketball player. He attended high school at Our Savior New American School in Centereach, New York, USA. Chavez Jacobo began his college career with the FIU Panthers from 2004 to 2006, but later transferred to St. Thomas University (Florida), which culminated with a conference championship in 2009. He began his professional career in 2009, in his native home of the Dominican Republic. Later he played professionally in Latvia, Spain, Costa Rica, Chile and finally Colombia.

== Personal life ==
He was born June 1, 1985, in Santo Domingo, Dominican Republic to his father Luis Chávez and mother Rosa Julia Jacobo de Chávez.
