= Fox Court and Fox Common (Berkeley, California) =

- Fox Court
- U.S. National Register of Historic Places
- California Historical Landmark
- Berkeley Landmark
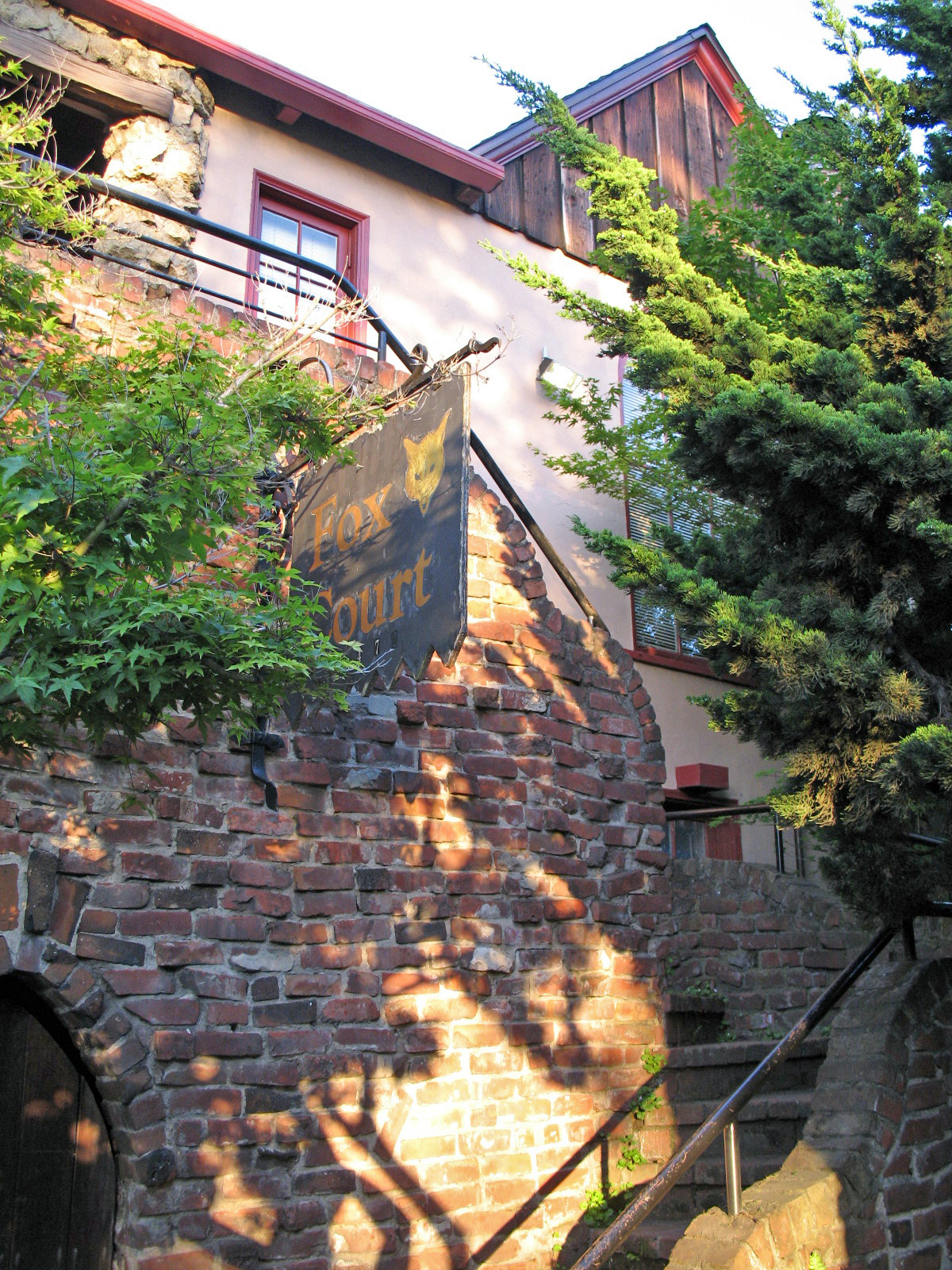
- Location: 1472–1478 University Ave., Berkeley, Alameda County, California, U.S.
- Coordinates: 37°52′13″N 122°16′53″W
- Area: 0.3 acres (0.12 ha)
- Built: between 1927 and 1930
- Architectural style: Late 19th And Early 20th Century American Movements, Hansel & Gretel
- NRHP reference No.: 82002159
- CHISL No.: N1018
- BERKL No.: 24

Significant dates
- Added to NRHP: February 4, 1982
- Designated CHISL: February 4, 1982
- Designated BERKL: November 20, 1978

Fox Common
- Interactive map of Fox Common
- Location: 1670–1676 University Ave., Berkeley, California, U.S.

Berkeley Landmark
- Designated: December 7, 1998
- Reference no.: 211

Fox Court and Fox Common are two historic building complexes located at University Avenue in Berkeley, California, U.S. Fox Court is listed on the National Register of Historic Places since February 4, 1982; and listed as a Berkeley Landmark by the city since November 20, 1978. Fox Common is listed as a Berkeley Landmark by the city since December 7, 1998.

== History ==
Fox Court and Fox Common embody a regional Northern California-style of storybook architecture of the 1920s, sometimes referred to as "Hansel and Gretel," or "Medieval Dollhouse." Fox Court and Fox Common were both designed by Carl Fox and built by his company the Fox Brothers Construction Firm.

=== Fox Court history ===
Fox Court consists of eighteen apartments are arranged in a series of one- and two story building. Three shops are located on the ground floor. The complex was constructed in stages between 1920 and 1930, is U-shaped, wrapping around a lushly planted interior courtyard. The structure is wood framed, with a brick and concrete exterior.

=== Fox Common history ===
Fox Common consists of two cottages, both are two story buildings. The Rose and William Berteaux Cottage (a different Fox Cottage) was designated a City of Berkeley Landmark on June 7, 1999, and moved in 2001 from 2612 Channing Way to 2350 Bowditch Street, Berkeley.

== See also ==
- List of Berkeley Landmarks in Berkeley, California
- National Register of Historic Places listings in Alameda County, California
