= Alvarado, California =

Coordinates: 37.5966°N 122.0777°W

Alvarado (formerly, New Haven) is a former settlement in and former county seat of Alameda County, California, now part of Union City, United States. It was located 5 miles (8 km) north-northwest of downtown Newark.

In 1851, Henry C. Smith founded the town of New Haven, named after his father's home town of New Haven, Connecticut. In 1853, the town amalgamated with a nearby town called Alvarado, and became the county seat of the newly formed Alameda County. Alvarado was named for Juan Alvarado, Mexican Governor of California from 1836 to 1842. The first post office opened in 1853.

On January 13, 1959, Alvarado and Decoto voted to incorporate as Union City, California.

Though New Haven and Alvarado are both now part of Union City, the name of New Haven lives on in the New Haven Unified School District.
