= Chicano Liberation Front =

1970s American revolutionary group

- Logo of the Chicano Liberation Front
- Leader: Unknown
- Dates active: 1970–1975
- Active regions: Southwestern United States
- Ideology: Chicanismo; Marxism; Anti-fascism; Anti-racism; Anti-capitalism; Anti-imperialism
- Political position: Left-wing
- Size: Unknown
- Part of: Chicano Movement

The Chicano Liberation Front (CLF) was an underground revolutionary group in California that committed dozens of bombings and arson attacks in the Los Angeles area in the early 1970s. In a taped message sent to the Los Angeles Free Press, the radical militant group publicly claimed responsibility for 28 bombings between March 1970 and July 1971. Their targets were typically banks, schools and supermarkets. They also claimed responsibility for a bomb at Los Angeles City Hall. The Chicano Liberation Front was also more than likely responsible for explosions at a downtown federal building and at the Los Angeles Hall of Justice, although those incidents remain officially unsolved.

No one has ever publicly identified themselves as being a member of the Chicano Liberation Front. The closest law enforcement ever got to the CLF appears to have been a 19-year-old named Freddie De Larosa Plank, who was charged for an attempted arson at a high school, and for firebombing a U.S. Army Reserve building. The CLF claimed responsibility for the latter event in August 1971. The 1970s leftist radical bombings were generally difficult crimes to solve, and the CLF was apparently extremely cautious, close-knit, and ideologically sincere enough, that they avoided the catastrophic collapses of other paramilitaries of the era.

A 1975 Time magazine article reported that CLF was thought to have "at least 15 hardcore members." One history of American terrorism said it was typical of "small groups of revolutionaries" like the Chicano Liberation Front to give themselves grandiose names to project strength, even when their actual membership count was likely closer to that of a squad than an army. The CLF apparently had at least one female member, as a woman called in claims of responsibility for two bombings, and the voice on the 1971 recording sent to the Free Press was female.

Part of the larger Chicano/Latino racial-progress movement, the group apparently sought "removal of police and other 'outside exploiters' from East Los Angeles" by use of revolutionary violence, in response to law-enforcement actions like the killing of the Sanchez cousins and the perceived suppression of Mexican-American political agitation (e.g., the August 29, 1970 LASD killing of journalist Ruben Salazar). The "sectarian Marxist" orientation of CLF opposed the relatively more genteel activism of the Chicano Moratorium.

The Chicano Liberation Front shared some ideological similarities with the Black power movement and American Indian Movement organizations of the same era, namely their vocal resistance to police brutality in the United States and their opposition to capitalist exploitation of the poor. Their use of "revolutionary" violence also placed them within a class of chaotic leftist entities that included the Weather Underground, the Symbionese Liberation Army, the New World Liberation Front, the Emiliano Zapata Unit, and the George Jackson Brigade.

Some of the later actions claimed by or attributed to the Chicano Liberation Front may have been the acts of hardened criminals (as was apparently the case with the assassination of William Cann), the Symbionese Liberation Army, the New World Liberation Front, or mildly rebellious teenagers. The Chicano Movement, as a whole, was non-violent and modeled on the civil rights movement led by Dr. Martin Luther King Jr. Chicano Liberation Front terrorism was said to be the "exception that proved the rule."

== History ==
The April 1971 bombing of Los Angeles City Hall was the first time the Chicano Liberation Front publicly claimed responsibility for a fire or explosion. (Herald Examiner, No. 00079286 via Haynes Foundation and TESSA Digital Collections, Los Angeles Public Library)

The CLF of primary historic interest is the group, active in the Los Angeles area, "formed in 1970 and vanished by 1971." This was a period that was roughly bookended by the Chicano Moratorium anti-war protests of 1970 and the first anniversary of the death of Ruben Salazar. There were upward of 5,000 small-scale, mostly politically motivated, bombings in the United States beginning in 1968. The actions of the Chicano Liberation Front initially blended in to the near-daily headlines that something had exploded somewhere. The true beginnings of the Chicano Liberation Front remain obscure because of their secretive tendencies. The closest thing to a primary source on the origins of the CLF appears in a 2007 oral history produced by University of California, Los Angeles:

The [Chicano] Moratorium people were being brought up on charges. That's after the second or third march. Every time, you would have a demonstration, the sheriff would just come and blow it up. Literally...Just storm the place, you know? All the time. And sure, years later, it was the sheriff's fault. But nobody cared. It's already done. But they were very effective at getting us so pissed off as a movement that [some] wanted us to take up arms. They wanted us to really fight—because they knew that we weren't going to win...People said, 'We need to take up arms.' There was a little group. They never knew who they were. They were called the Chicano Liberation Front. They did some small minor things. They did some bad bombs and all of that. They never got caught because they knew that you couldn't let anybody into the group.

— John Valadez, L.A. Xicano Project oral-history interview (2007)

The phrase Chicano liberation front first appears in print as one of several general ideas generated at a Chicano community conference in Denver in March 1970.

On September 4, 1970, a bomb exploded at the Los Angeles Hall of Justice. The CLF never claimed responsibility for this bombing, but the recording sent to the Los Angeles Free Press had two unintelligible or erased descriptions of events that, if the Front spokeswoman was keeping to a chronological order, would have occurred between March 1970 and September 29, 1970. Furthermore, in Racism on Trial: The Chicano Fight for Justice (2003), Ian F. Haney López argues that the fictionalized bombing of the Hall of Justice in Oscar Acosta's Revolt of the Cockroach People broadly derives from real-world activities of the CLF. Acosta's narrative conflates the Hall of Justice bombing of 1970, which had no casualties, and the fatal consequences of the January 1971 L.A. federal building bombing, and states that the intended target of the novel's Hall of Justice bomb was Superior Court Judge Arthur Alarcón.

The first public notice that the CLF even existed came with the April 1971 explosion of a bomb in the second-floor men's room at Los Angeles' landmark City Hall building. Future Los Angeles mayor Tom Bradley, then a city councilman, was seated 150 ft (46 m) away from the late-afternoon explosion. A woman made a call to the City News Service and repeated a phrase three times: "The bomb at City Hall is in memory of the Sanchez brothers...Chicano Liberation Front." Following the city hall bombing, a "police undercover agent" reportedly claimed that the group was "similar" to the Weather Underground, that it had been formed in Northern California in 1970, and that the group's membership in the Southern California area was "relatively small" but "hardcore."

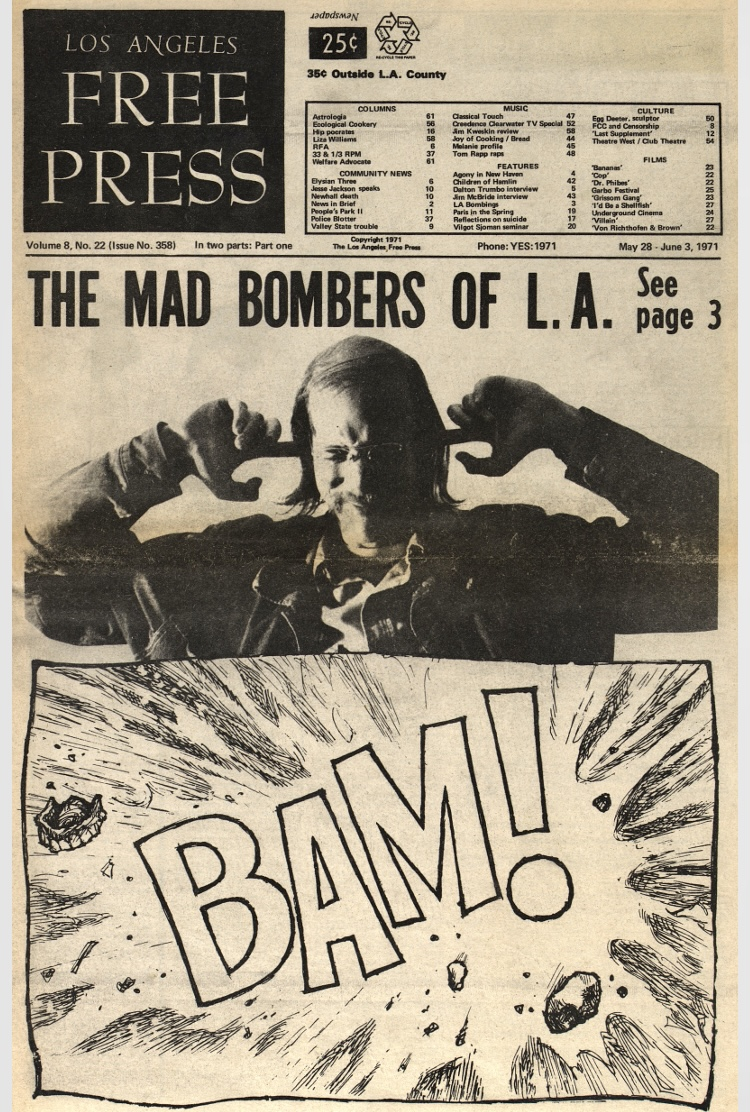
"Mad Bombers of L.A." cover story, Los Angeles Free Press, issue 358, dated May 28 – June 3, 1971 (Archives and Special Collections at the Thomas J. Dodd Research Center, University of Connecticut via JSTOR's Reveal Digital)

In May 1971, Los Angeles County's primary alternative newspaper of the era, the Los Angeles Free Press, published a cover story called "The Mad Bombers of L.A." which featured a detailed list of notable bombings in the greater Los Angeles area since April 1970. The Free Press (Freep for short) was well-known for calling out extrajudicial killings of civilians by law enforcement. Apparently this reputation, in combination with the bombing index compiled by reporter Michael Blake and persistent interview requests made by LAFP city editor Judie Lewellen, compelled the CLF to say their piece in the form of a recording.

We are students, janitors, so-called wetbacks, concerned parents, Vietnam veterans...we are the fighting vanguard of La Raza...fed up with our people being treated like dogs.

— Recording mailed to Los Angeles Free Press, August 1971

The August 1971 tape, which listed a couple dozen bombings the group wanted credit for, pointedly does not mention the January 1971 explosion that killed 18-year-old part-time mail orderly Tomas Ortiz. Ortiz's death, if it was CLF, was the only death—and seemingly the only casualty of any kind—that could or would be attributed to the Chicano Liberation Front bombing spree. A 2000 analysis of patterns of domestic terrorism in the United States classified the death of Ortiz under "accidental and unintended," stating that some murders by terrorist groups were "clearly not intended" and included the killing of "a Chicano employee by the Chicano Liberation Front" as an example. The CLF statement also insisted that the overall lack of injuries or deaths resulting from their attacks was because the group's bombs were "carefully researched and accomplished. We would never jeopardize the life of any person, whoever he may be."

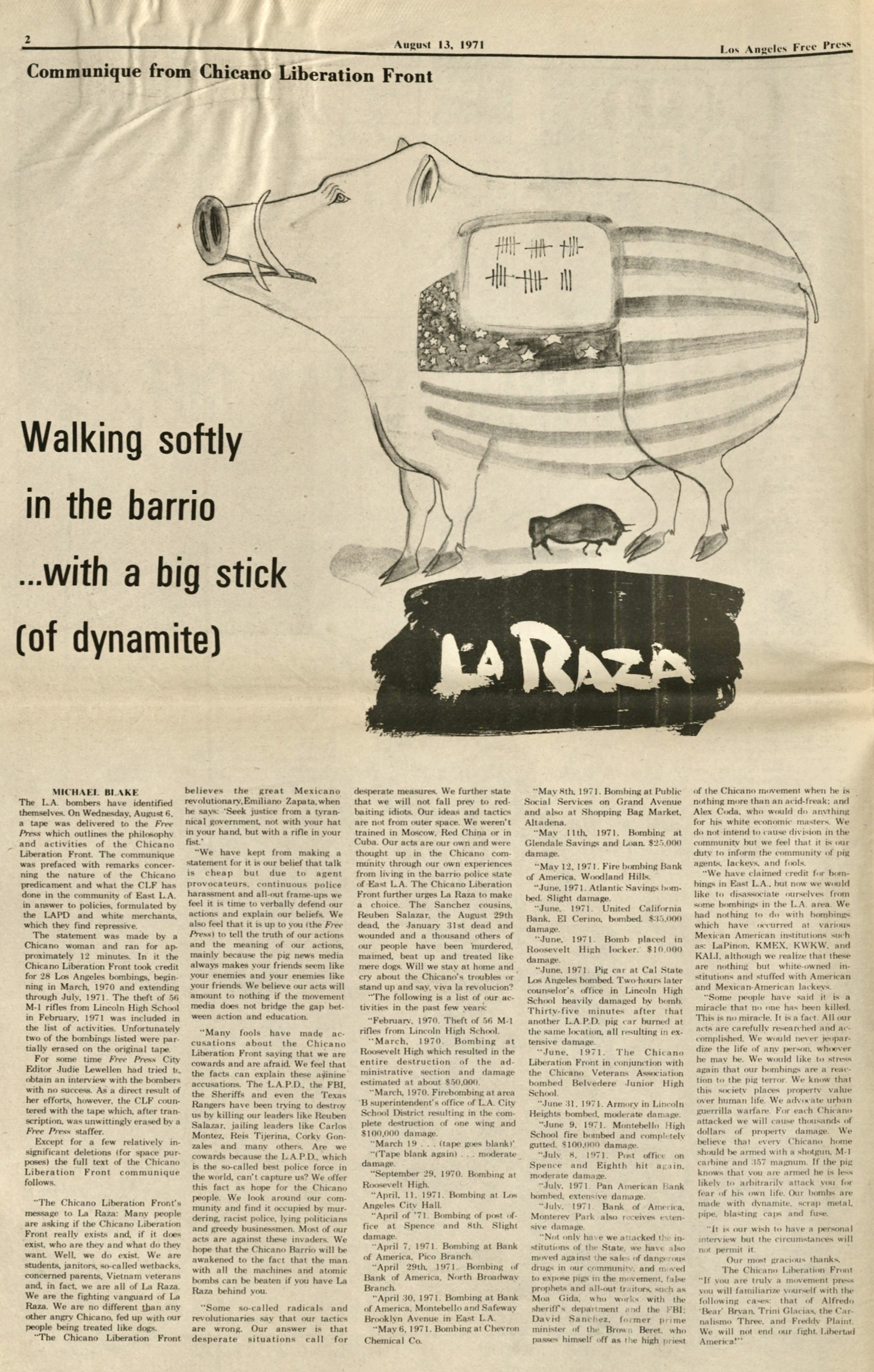
CLF statement as published in the Los Angeles Free Press, issue 369, August 13–18, 1971 (via Center for Southwest Research, University of New Mexico, Underground Newspaper Collection)

The spokeswoman also lectured the editors of the Los Angeles Free Press that if they were really the radical outlet they purported to be, they should educate themselves on the following people/cases:

- Alfredo "Bear" Bryan
- Trini Inglesias
- Carnalismo Three
- Freddie Plank

Per the Los Angeles Times citing law-enforcement sources, the first three were charged with various flavors of homicide, the last was a 19-year-old charged with firebombing an Eastside high school and, separately, a U.S. Army Reserve building. Freddie De Larosa Plank was arrested in April 1970 after he and three unidentified companions attempted to light the Lincoln High School admin building on fire by shooting at a pile of gunpowder set on a gasoline-soaked office carpet. Otherwise in April 1970 Plank and another student, Jorge Rodriguez, were named as student leaders of a school reform movement at Roosevelt High, both of whom had been expelled for failure to disperse during a demonstration. Plank and Rodriguez then set up Euclid High, a continuation school program for 50-odd students who had also been expelled.

In June 1971, the Los Angeles Herald-Examiner, the city's afternoon paper, received a phone call during which the Chicano Liberation Front claimed responsibility for a bomb placed at Roosevelt High in East Los Angeles. A police spokesman told the Associated Press at that time that the CLF claimed, in leaflets, to be "devoted to harassing police." A 2017 history of the school (produced in anticipation of a remodel) stated that the school's "R-Building" was the site of "small bombing events" and arson actions by the Chicano Liberation Front in the 1970s. The school was hit at least three times and while "no one was injured, damage to two main buildings required repairs."

Police officer Peters inspects bomb damage at Roosevelt High on September 29, 1970; Roosevelt was one of CLF's most frequent targets. (Photographed by Russell Pursley for the Herald Examiner, No. 00095526 via TESSA Digital Collections, Los Angeles Public Library)

August 1971 was the occasion of the first anniversary of the death of journalist Ruben Salazar, who had been struck in the temple by a tear-gas canister fired into a restaurant by a L.A. County sheriff's deputy at the National Chicano Moratorium March. Unrest was expected, and when interviewed by the Los Angeles Times (where Salazar had once worked), "More than one activist cited the bombings as the most extreme reflection of the bitterness felt by at least one small segment of East Los Angeles' Mexican-American community." The CLF distributed flyers advocating vigilante/guerrilla action, but as it happened, the anniversary of Salazar's death passed without incident.

In September 1971 a professor of human behavior told an Associated Press reporter that radical bombings in California were mostly perpetrated by bourgeois whites or "Mexican-Americans living up to a revolutionary tradition." A 1972 statement of the "national policies" of the Brown Berets specifically repudiated the Chicano Liberation Front: "Any Brown Beret who identifies as being part of the small scattered incidents of the Chicano Liberation Front is terminated."

Chicano Liberation Front bombing in Los Angeles seemed to cease with the close of 1971, but to this day, researchers "do not know why [the CLF bombings] ended." In an idiosyncratic obituary of Chicano activist attorney Oscar Zeta Acosta written for Rolling Stone in 1977, Hunter S. Thompson (author of the article about the Chicano Movement called "Strange Rumblings in Aztlan") articulated a strong impression that Acosta could have been directly involved in the Chicano Liberation Front bombings. He described the lawyer as someone who stayed up all night "eating acid and throwing Molotov cocktails" and then arrived for morning court on a waft of gasoline fumes, with "a green crust of charred soap-flakes" visible on his status-symbol snakeskin cowboy boots. Furthermore, Acosta had apparently written to Thompson in 1972 to the effect that: "I think I can make a pretty good argument that it was you, or God through you, that called a halt to the bombings...Which means that you'll be remembered as the Benedict Arnold of the cockroach revolt."

After 1971, CLF claims of responsibility were mostly for incidents that occurred outside of Los Angeles. These were likely distinct entities borrowing the name and some of the ideological messaging of the original. The New World Liberation Front in particular was an extremely prolific and chaotic terrorist "brand" that adapted a variety of personas original to other underground radicals of the era. Nonetheless, the name CLF appeared sporadically in crime reports until the middle of the decade. Some of the mid-1970s incidents for which the "Chicano Liberation Front" claimed responsibility included three Safeway bombs planted in Northern California in 1974, bombs planted around the Bay Area in 1975 (these explosions were "dedicated" to the United Farm Workers, which in turn denounced the bombers), a police substation bombing and incidents at two other locations in El Paso, Texas in 1975, and a clutch of Bank of America and Safeway bombings in the San Francisco area in early 1975. Following several explosions in Sacramento in 1975, a newspaper reported that "An inquiry is also expected into the series of bombings around this area for the last 18 months, most of them claimed by the so-called New World Liberation Front, but some by a group calling itself the Chicano Liberation Front." By the end of 1975, people stopped tossing dynamite on the roofs of banks in the name of the Chicano Liberation Front; a report on domestic terrorism happenings in February 1976 said the Chicano Liberation Front had "been silent for at least a year."

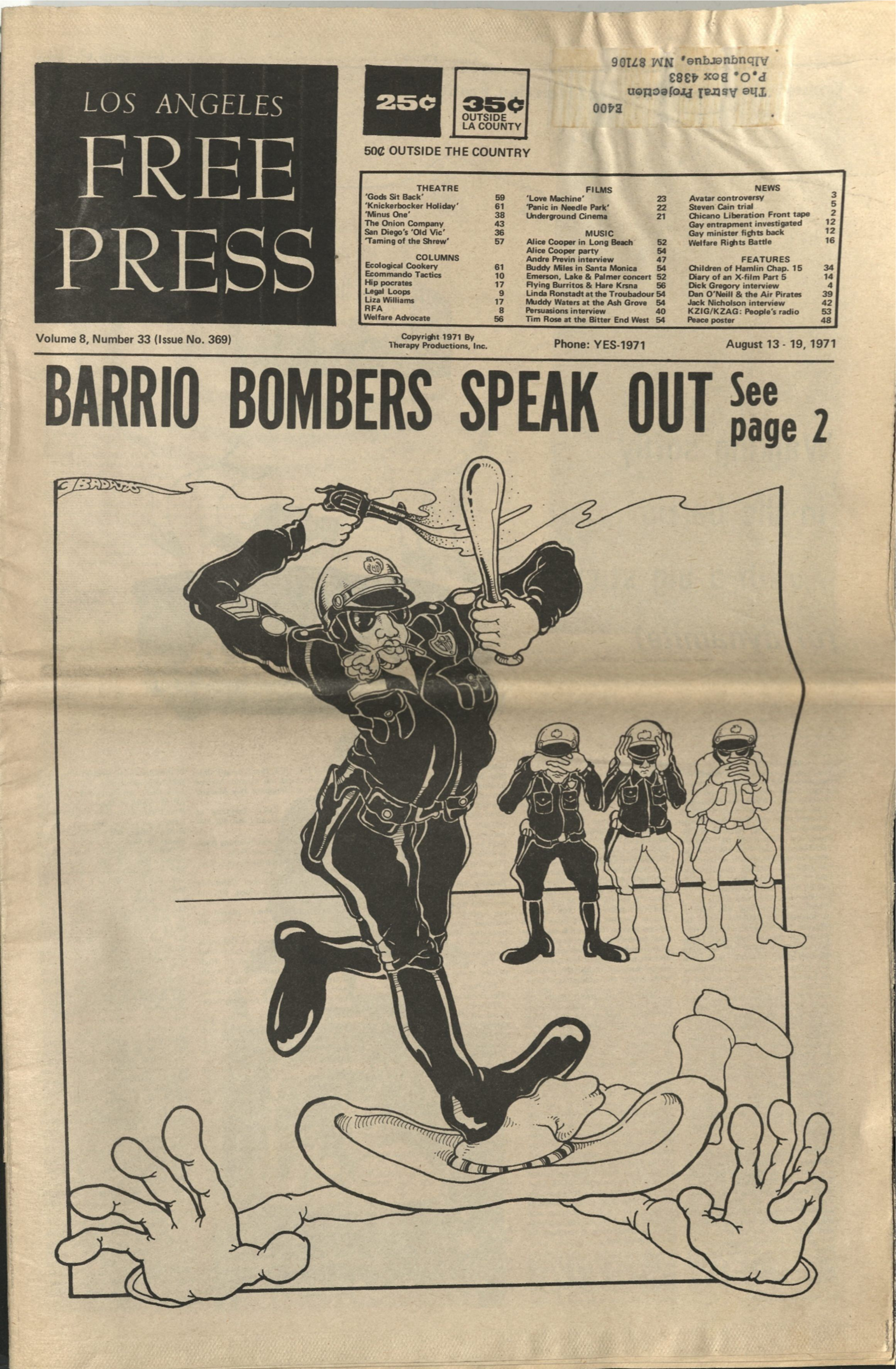
Cover line: "Barrio Bombers Speak Out" (Center for Southwest Research, University of New Mexico – Underground Newspaper Collection)

In one long-time Chicano activist's memoir, published in 2019, he recalled the CLF from a distance of almost 50 years: "The bombings were more symbolic than anything else; I do not remember that anyone was ever hurt. Buildings were damaged, including several banks, but not human life." One history says "it is impossible to rule out" FBI or LAPD false-flag action. The FBI case-file number for the Chicano Liberation Front was 105-209116.

== Legacy ==
"Strange Rumblings in Aztlan" appeared in issue 81 of Rolling Stone magazine; photos of the day (and of the kind of tear-gas canister) that killed Salazar came from La Raza and the L.A. Times; Annie Leibovitz made the portrait of Oscar Acosta and shot scenes of life in East L.A.

Per a 2014 U.S. Department of Homeland Security (DHS) analysis of patterns of domestic terrorism in the United States, the Chicano Liberation Front was responsible for two percent of all terrorist attacks in the U.S. in 1970s. DHS attributes two deaths to the CLF, presumably referring to Tomas Ortiz and William Cann.

The Chicano Liberation Front is a lurking presence in "Strange Rumblings in Aztlan," Hunter S. Thompson's article about Los Angeles and the Chicano Movement after the death of Salazar, which was published in Rolling Stone's April 29, 1971, issue and is anthologized in The Great Shark Hunt. Thompson's narrative ends at the time of the City Hall bombing, although Acosta appears as "Dr. Gonzo" in Thompson's Fear and Loathing in Las Vegas. In any case, Thompson's perspective on law enforcement was not particularly in conflict with the CLF's antipathy to the local police:

The malignant reality of Ruben Salazar's death is that he was murdered by angry cops for no reason at all—and that the L.A. Sheriff's Department was and still is prepared to defend that murder on grounds that it was entirely justified.

— Hunter S. Thompson, 1971

The Chicano Liberation Front also plays a role in Acosta's roman à clef The Revolt of the Cockroach People. Acosta used a mix of invented and real names for the characters in Cockroach People—Hunter Thompson is "Stonewall," but L.A. city mayor Sam Yorty is Sam Yorty—without leaving behind a clear explanation of why or how he chose to name the players. His name for the female member of the ring who called in claims of responsibility is "Elena". Acosta's Cockroach People alter ego Buffalo Z. Brown describes members of the Chicano Liberation Front as vatos locos and states that they, in turn, think he is a "sheep" who is "being used," a capitalist pig, a traitor, and/or a Tío Taco.

In "The Banshee Screams for Buffalo Meat", Thompson's 1977 obit for Acosta, he off-handedly describes people who may have been associated with the CLF. While reminiscing about his concerns of law-enforcement infiltration in the period while he was reporting out the story that became "Strange Rumblings," Thompson addresses the by-then-long-dead Acosta (who disappeared somewhere in or around Mexico in 1974): "How many of those bomb-throwing, trigger-happy freaks who slept on mattresses in your apartment were talking to the sheriff on a chili-hall pay phone every morning?" In the foreword to The Gonzo Letters, Volume II, the historian David Halberstam argues that Thompson's work is instinctual, authentic and speaks to incontrovertible human truths, which does not necessarily mean that Thompson constructed his work solely out of literal facts.

The Chicano Liberation Front is also mentioned in an anti-war movement poem by Patricio Paiz called "En Memoria de Arturo Tijerina." The poet writes for a U.S. soldier from the Rio Grande Valley who was killed by a sniper two weeks after he arrived in South Vietnam in 1968. Over the course of the poem, Paiz aligns himself with both "generally rebellious individuals or causes," and the long history of Chicano resistance to oppression, following the line "I am the Chicano Liberation Front" with a despairing conclusion:

Is there no other way?
Is violence the ONLY WAY?
Cesar Chavez y Martin Luther King. No violence.
Fasting and brotherhood awareness.
Amerikkka, I won't forget you.
La lechuga, el betabel,
the inhuman conditions my brothers have endured.

== See also ==
- Venceremos (political organization)
- East L.A. walkouts
- Dolores Huerta
- Delano grape strike
