= Decoto, California =

Neighborhood of Union City, California

Coordinates: 37°36′7.66″N 122°0′58.39″W

Decoto is a neighborhood of Union City, California, United States originally established as a separate community. It is located 5 miles (8 km) north-northwest of downtown Newark, along California State Route 238.

== History ==
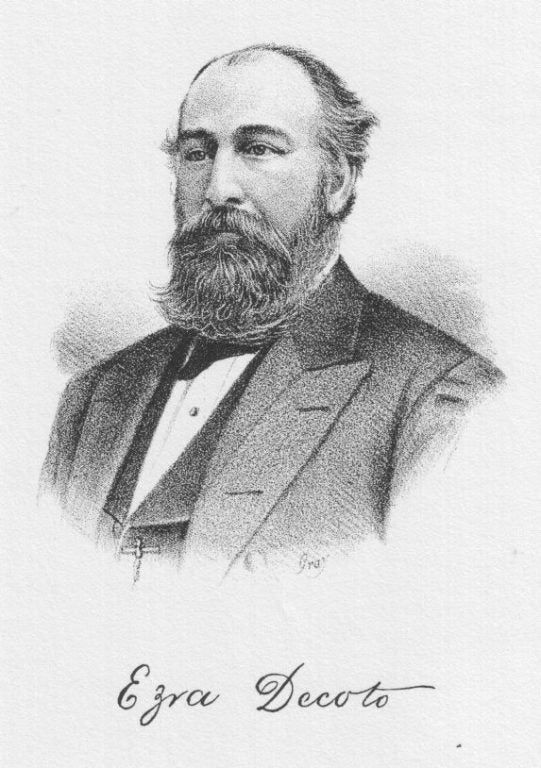
Decoto is named after Ezra Decoto.

In 1867, Ezra Decoto, a local landowner, sold land to the railroad; a settlement subsequently grew up and was named for him. A post office operated in Decoto from 1871 to 1959, with a closure from 1872 to 1875. Decoto was listed in the 1950 United States census as an unincorporated place with a population of 2,830. In 1958, Decoto joined Alvarado to form Union City.

The area's population has historically been largely Latino, mostly Mexican-American. Starting in the 1930s and especially during World War Two, Mexican families began moving to Decoto. Many were braceros who came to work during the labor shortages of the war years. During the early 1970s, the Chicano Movement was in full swing and racial tensions were high in Decoto between the Latino community and police and the local Union City government. In April 1974, Alberto Terrones was shot and killed during a robbery by Union City police. Riots erupted in Decoto. To calm tensions, Union City police chief William Cann came to speak at Our Lady of Rosary Catholic Church in Decoto. Cann was shot by a sniper and died a few months later. Many Asians, particularly Filipinos, have since moved to Union City, which has sometimes been called "Little Manila" as a result.

United Airlines Flight 615 crashed near Decoto on its approach to Oakland airport shortly before 4:30 AM Pacific Time on August 24, 1951.
