= New Haven Unified School District =

School district in California, United States

Address
- 34200 Alvarado-Niles Road Union City, California, 94587; United States

District information
- Type: Public
- Grades: K–12
- Schools: 13
- NCES District ID: 0626910

Students and staff
- Students: 10,069 (2024–25)
- Teachers: 406.93 (on an FTE basis)
- Staff: 401.18 (on an FTE basis)
- Student–teacher ratio: 24.74

Other information
- Website: www.mynhusd.org

New Haven Unified School District (also known as NHUSD) is a public school district serving approximately 10,000 kindergarten through 12th-grade (K–12) students at 11 schools in Union City and South Hayward, in the San Francisco Bay Area.

The district was formed in 1965 from elementary school districts in Union City, and from the Union High School District in Fremont. New Haven was an early settlement on the west side of present-day Union City. New Haven became part of Alvarado, which maintained its name for more than 100 years until Union City was formed in the late 1950s. The New Haven School District was founded and took its name from the old settlement. Since Union City incorporated, its name is also part of the district's logo, which shows a group of children from all races and backgrounds holding hands around the city.

== Schools ==
The New Haven Unified School District (NHUSD) is represented by five publicly elected trustees. Each trustee represents areas in Union City and South Hayward. New Haven School district will be switching to district elections on November 3, 2020.

=== Elementary schools ===
Grades K–5

- Alvarado Elementary School
- Delaine Eastin Elementary School
- Guy Emanuele Elementary School
- Hillview Crest Elementary School
- Tom Kitayama Elementary School
- Pioneer Elementary School
- Searles Elementary School

=== Middle schools ===
Grades 6–8

- César Chávez Middle School
- Itliong-Vera Cruz Middle School

=== High schools ===
Grades 9–12

- Conley-Caraballo High School (continuation high school)
- James Logan High School

=== Other Schools ===
- Decoto School for Independent Study
- New Haven Adult School

== Strikes and incidents ==
=== 2019 strike ===
On May 19, 2019, the New Haven Teachers’ Association announced the beginning of a strike May 20, 2019.

=== Shooting ===
On November 20, 2019, two boys Kevin Hernandez (11) and Sean Withington (14) were shot in the parking lot of Searles Elementary School around 1 am, while sitting in a minivan. Both boys died of their wounds, one at the scene and the other at the hospital. The two were not known to be enrolled in the school. 18-year-old Jason Cornejo of Castro Valley and a 17-year-old juvenile from Hayward were arrested on February 14, 2020. The first two arrested had gang affiliations, and it was suspected they thought the victims had ties with a rival gang.
