= United Air Lines Flight 615 =

1951 aviation accident

Coordinates: 37°36′52″N 121°59′33″W

- The wreckage and remains of the accident aircraft.

Accident
- Date: August 24, 1951
- Summary: Controlled flight into terrain
- Site: Decoto, near Oakland Municipal Airport, Oakland, California, United States

Aircraft
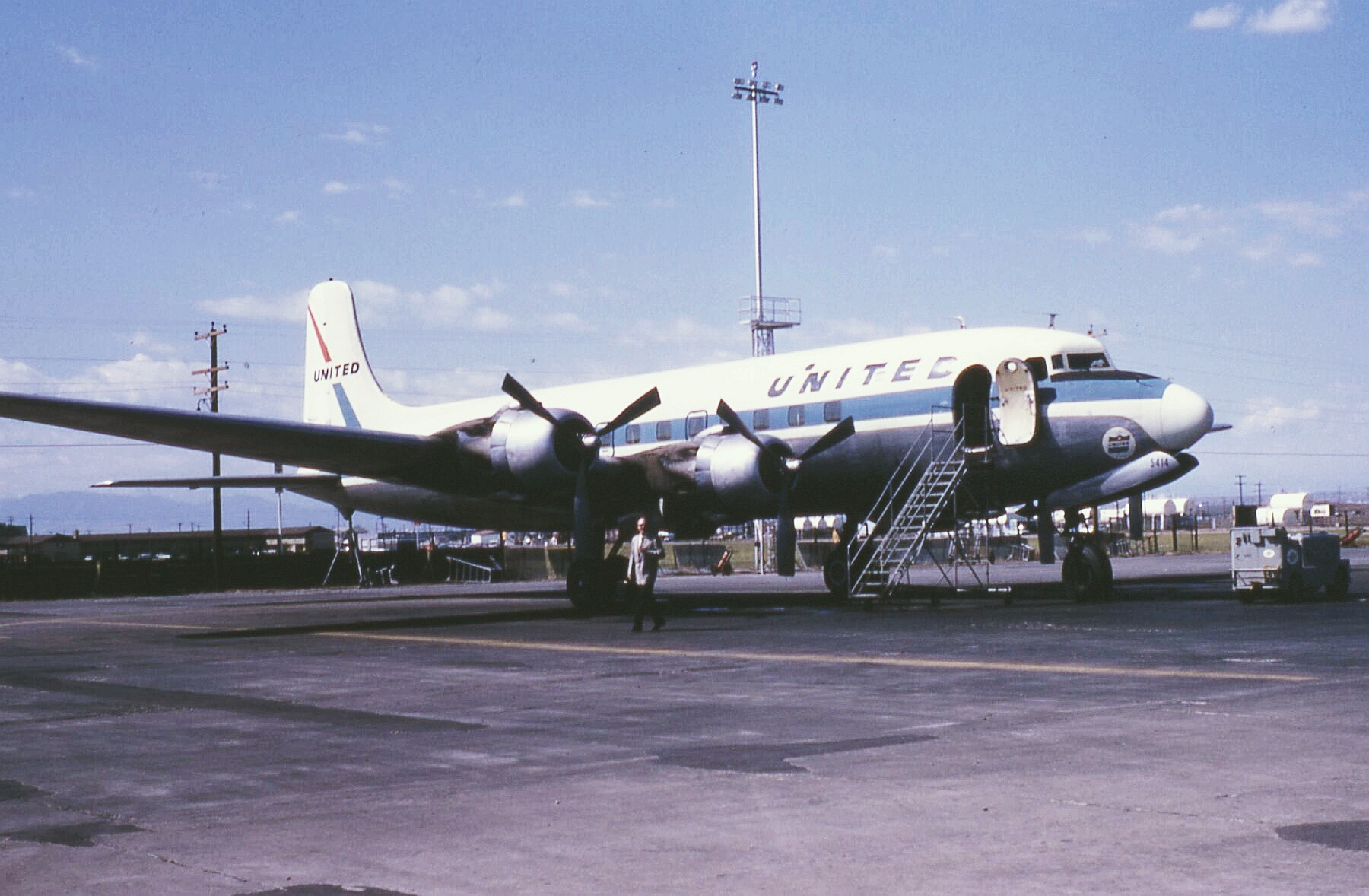
- A UAL DC-6 similar to the accident aircraft
- Aircraft type: Douglas DC-6B
- Aircraft name: Mainliner Omaha
- Operator: United Airlines
- IATA flight No.: UA615
- ICAO flight No.: UAL615
- Call sign: UNITED 615
- Registration: N37550
- Flight origin: Logan Airport, Boston
- 1st stopover: Bradley International Airport, Hartford, Connecticut
- 2nd stopover: Cleveland Hopkins International Airport, Cleveland, Ohio
- 3rd stopover: O'Hare International Airport, Chicago, Illinois
- Last stopover: Oakland Municipal Airport, Oakland, California
- Destination: San Francisco International Airport, San Francisco, California
- Occupants: 50
- Passengers: 44
- Crew: 6
- Fatalities: 50
- Survivors: 0

United Air Lines Flight 615 was a US transcontinental east–west airline service from Boston to Hartford, Cleveland, Chicago, Oakland and San Francisco. On August 24, 1951, the Douglas DC-6 with registration N37550 operating the service, crashed on approach to Oakland, causing the death of all 44 passengers and 6 crew members on board.

The flight departed Chicago at 10:59 p.m. CST en route to Oakland. At around 4:16 a.m., the plane was approaching Oakland. At this time, the pilot, Marion W. Hedden of Los Altos, had talked with the control tower of the Civil Aeronautics Administration at the airport preparing for his landing, and had mentioned no trouble. At 4:25 a.m., Flight 615 was cleared for the straight-in approach into Oakland.

This approach clearance was the last radio transmission with the flight. The plane crashed into mountainous terrain 15 miles (24 km) southeast of Oakland, careening into Tolman Peak and over its knoll, scattering on the downslope and into Dry Gulch Canyon below in a fiery explosion. All 50 persons on board perished.

After an investigation, it was determined that the pilot ignored the prescribed instrument landing procedures. The pilot instead relied on visual reference, using the copilot's automatic direction finder (ADF). The ADF threw the plane three miles (4.8 km) off course and below the prescribed altitude of 3,500 feet (1,100 m).
