= Marillenschnaps =

Austrian brandy made from apricots

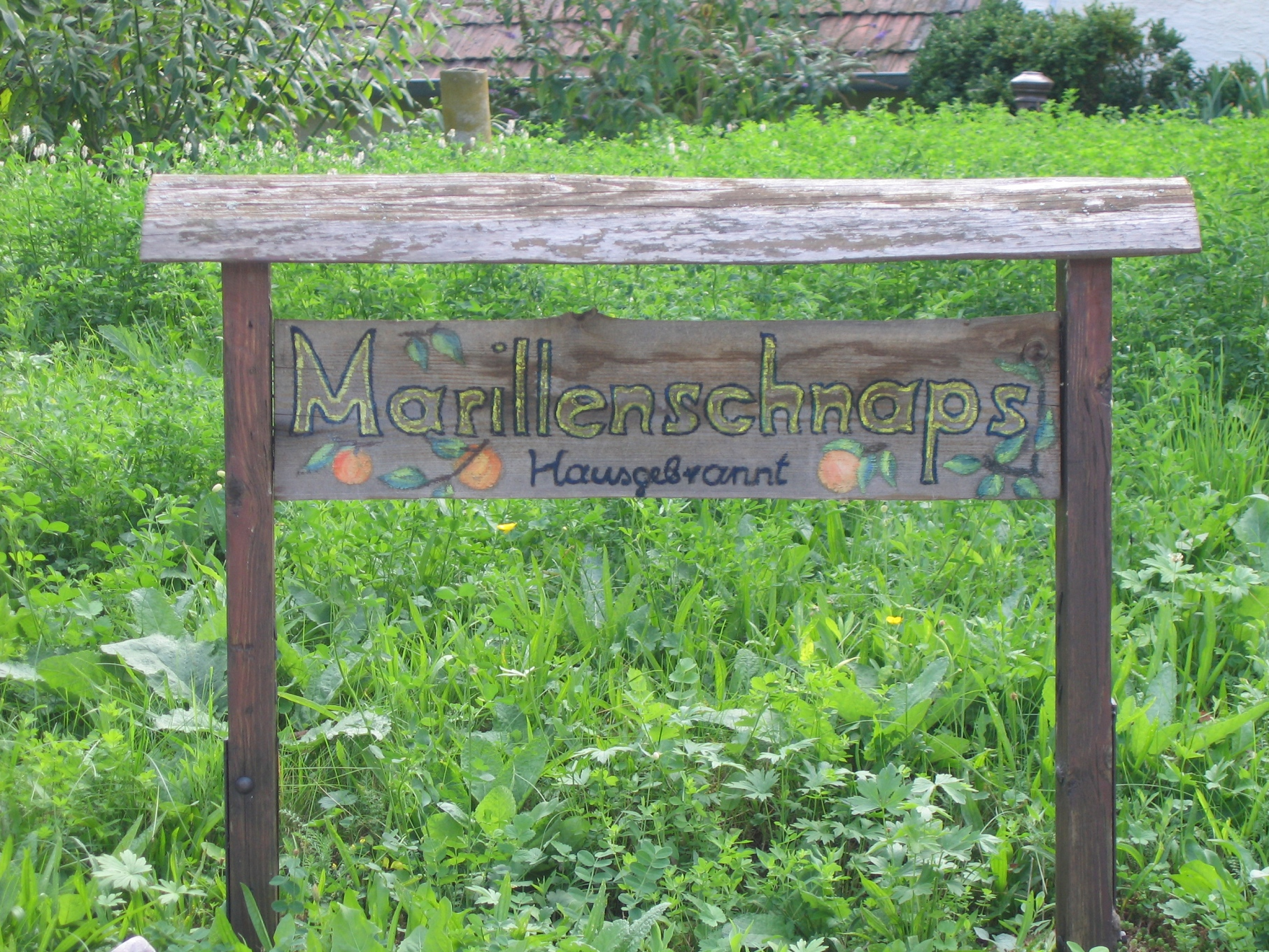
A sign advertising home-made Marillenschnaps in Austria

Marillenschnaps, also called Marillenbrand, is a fruit brandy made from apricots. It is mostly produced in the Wachau region of Austria, but similar apricot brandies are produced elsewhere. Many small orchards produce excellent home-made varieties of Marillenschnaps.

Marillen is an Austrian German and Bavarian term for apricots, which are known as Aprikosen in other German-speaking regions.

Marillenschnaps, like other spirit drinks in the European Union are regulated under Regulation (EU) 2019/787, which defines a spirit drink as an alcoholic beverage with a minimum alcoholic strength of 15% by volume and establishes rules for labelling and geographical-indication protection.

== Production ==
Marillenschnaps should be clear with a strong apricot aroma. Apricot fruit brandies are generally produced by double-distilling fermented apricot mash. Its alcohol content should be close to 40% ABV. One hundred kilograms (220 lb) of ripe apricots will produce about eight litres (2 US gal) of Marillenschnaps.

== Cultural use ==
Marillenschnaps is commonly served as a digestif in Austria and neighbouring regions. Fruit brandies in Central Europe are traditionally consumed after meals and are often associated with regional cuisine and hospitality.

Apricot brandy may also be used in desserts and pastries.

== See also ==
- Barack (brandy)
- Schnapps
