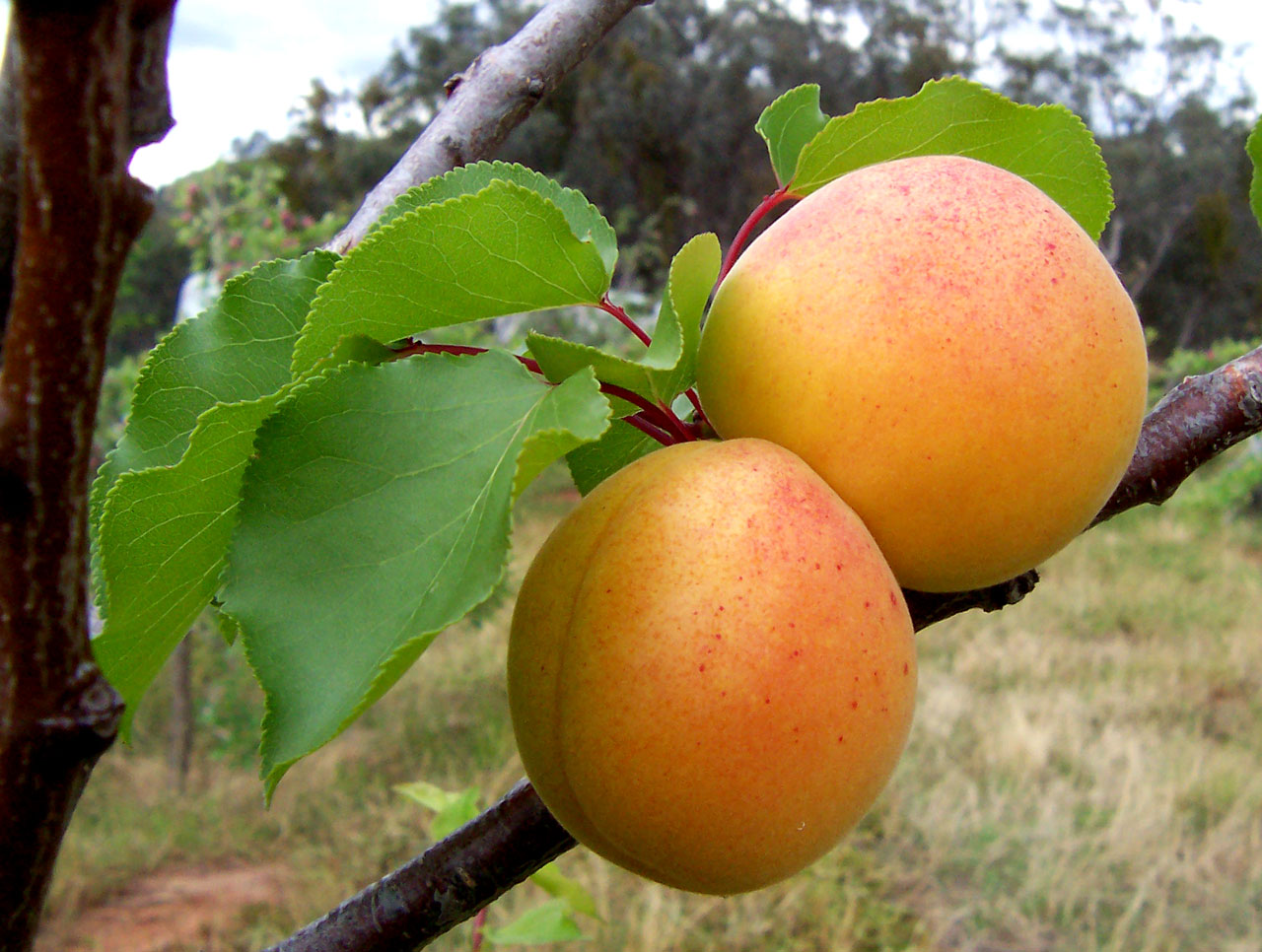
- Apricot fruits

Conservation status
- Data Deficient (IUCN 3.1)

Scientific classification
- Kingdom: Plantae
- Clade: Tracheophytes
- Clade: Angiosperms
- Clade: Eudicots
- Clade: Rosids
- Order: Rosales
- Family: Rosaceae
- Genus: Prunus
- Subgenus: Prunus subg. Prunus
- Section: Prunus sect. Armeniaca
- Species: P. armeniaca

Binomial name
- Prunus armeniaca L.

Synonyms
- Amygdalus armeniaca (L.) Dumort.; Armeniaca ansu (Maxim.) Kostina; Armeniaca vulgaris Lam.; Prunus ansu (Maxim.) Kom.; Armeniaca holosericea (Batalin) Kostina; Armeniaca armeniaca (L.) Huth; Prunus tiliifolia Salisb.; Prunus xanthocarpos Hort. ex C.Koch

= Prunus armeniaca =

Species of apricot

Prunus armeniaca is the most commonly cultivated apricot species. The native range is somewhat uncertain due to its extensive prehistoric cultivation. Genetic studies indicate Central Asia is the center of origin. It is extensively cultivated in many countries and has escaped into the wild in many places. The specific epithet armeniaca refers to the country of Armenia.

== Description ==
Prunus armeniaca is a small tree, 8–12 m (26–39 ft) tall, with a trunk up to 40 cm (16 in) in diameter and a dense, spreading canopy. The leaves are ovate, 5–9 cm (2.0–3.5 in) long and 4–8 cm (1.6–3.1 in) wide, with a rounded base, a pointed tip and a finely serrated margin. The flowers are 2–4.5 cm (0.8–1.8 in) in diameter, with five white to pinkish petals; they are produced singly or in pairs in early spring before the leaves. The fruit is a drupe similar to a small peach, 1.5–2.5 cm (0.6–1.0 in) diameter (larger in some modern cultivars), from yellow to orange, often tinged red on the side most exposed to the sun; its surface can be smooth (botanically described as: glabrous) or velvety with very short hairs (botanically: pubescent). The flesh (mesocarp) is succulent and its taste can range from sweet to tart. The single seed is enclosed in a hard, stony shell, often called a "stone", with a grainy, smooth texture except for three ridges running down one side.

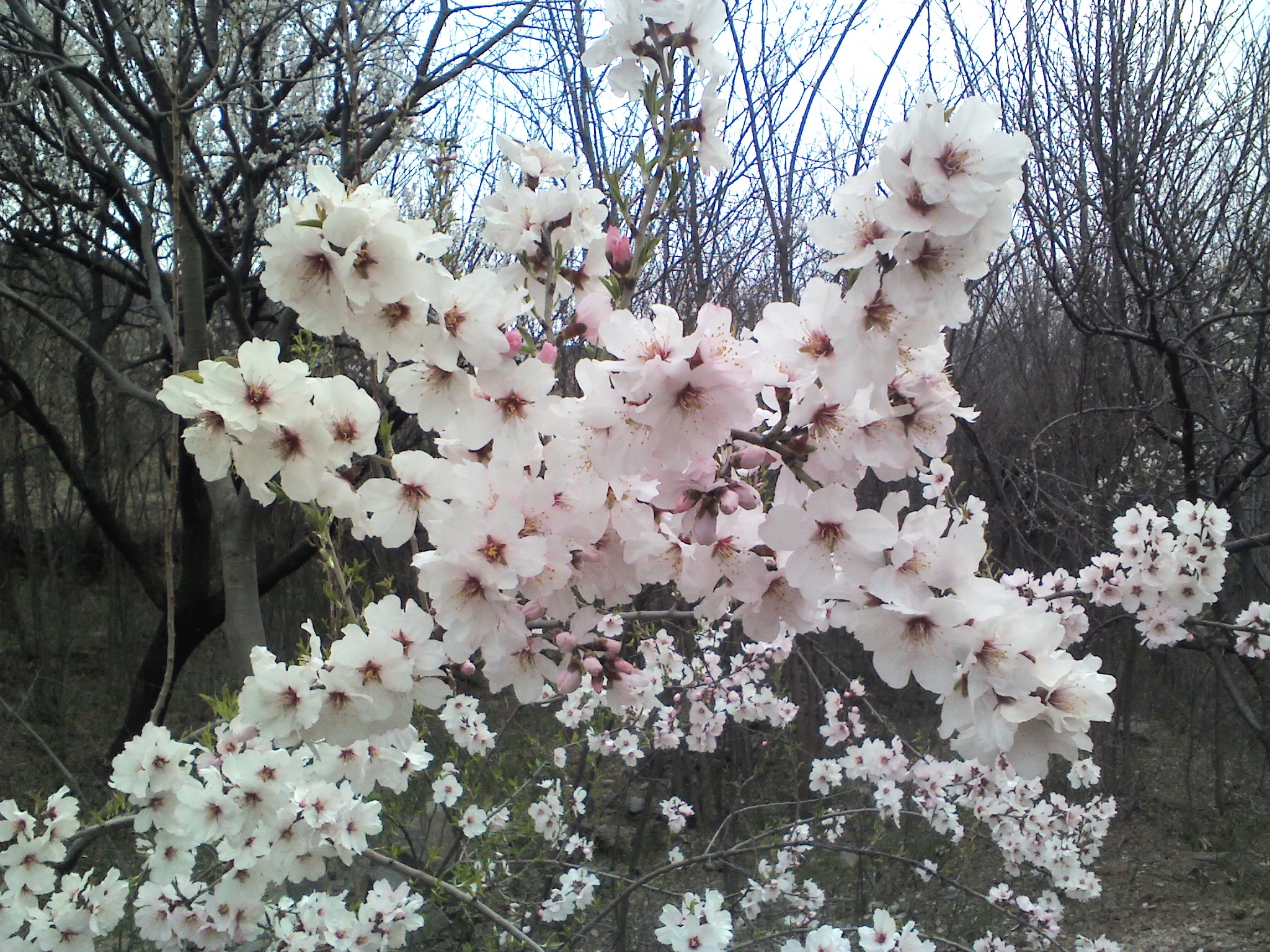
Apricot flowers in the village of Benhama, Kashmir

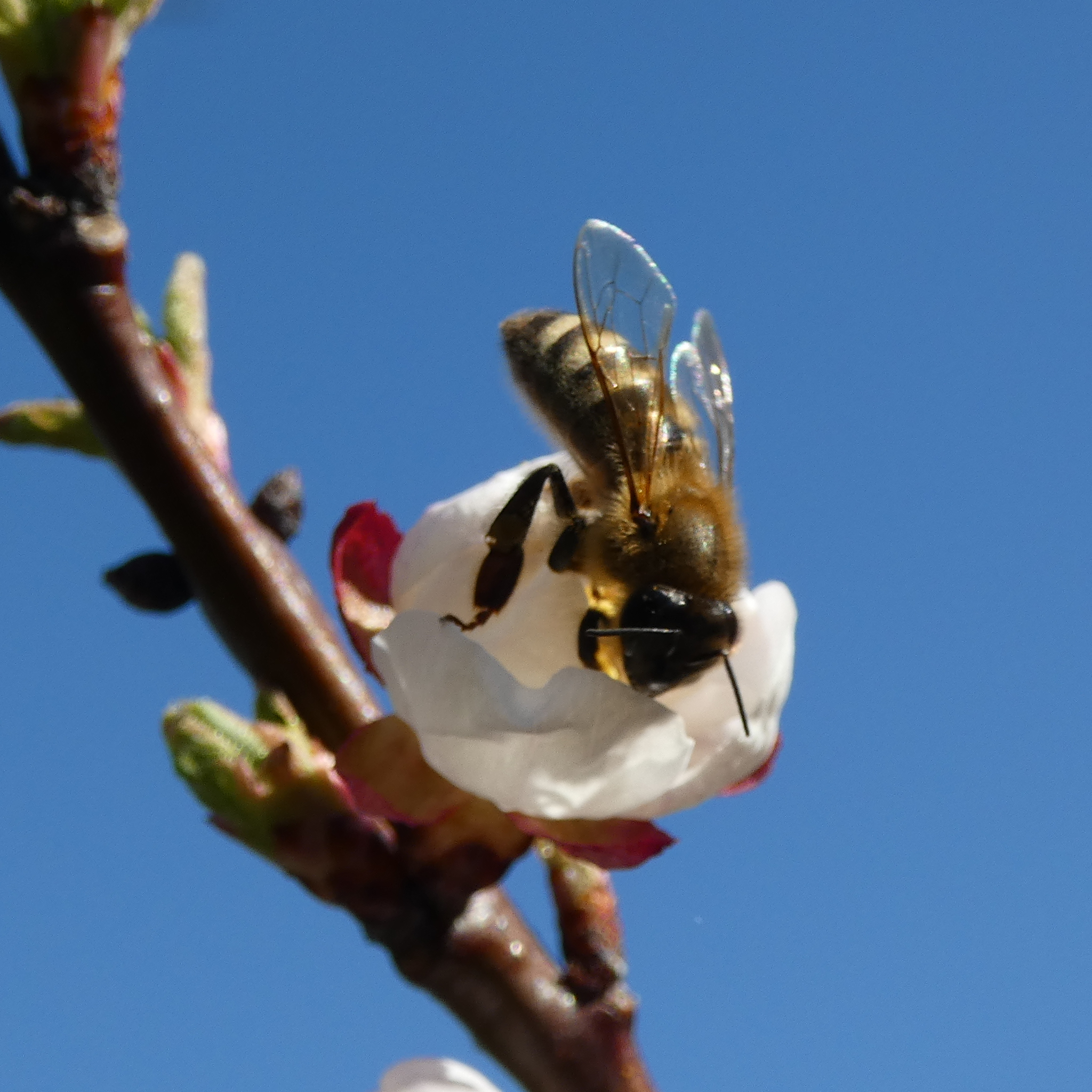
A pollination of an apricot tree blossom by a honey bee in Czech Republic

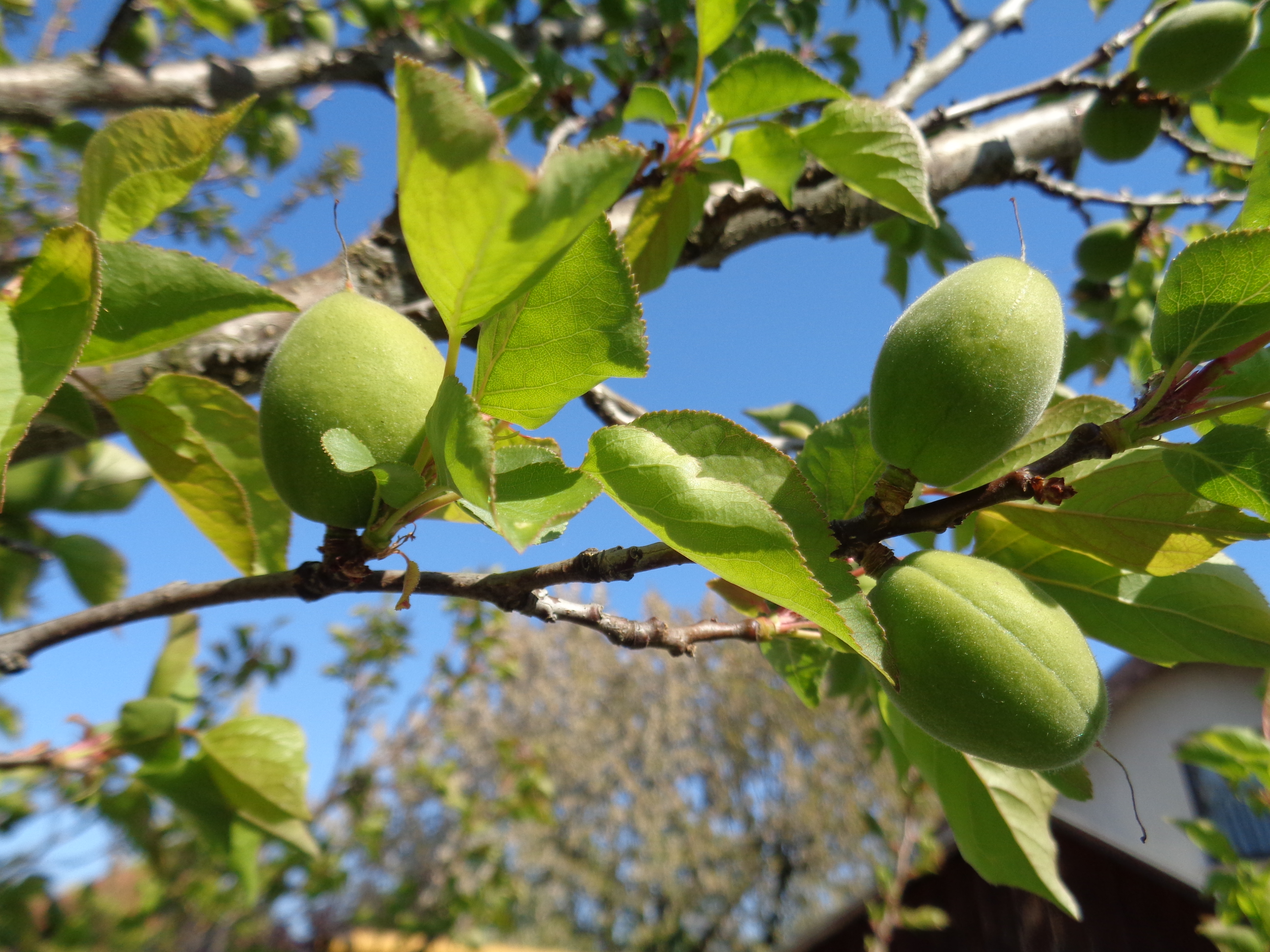
Unripe fruits

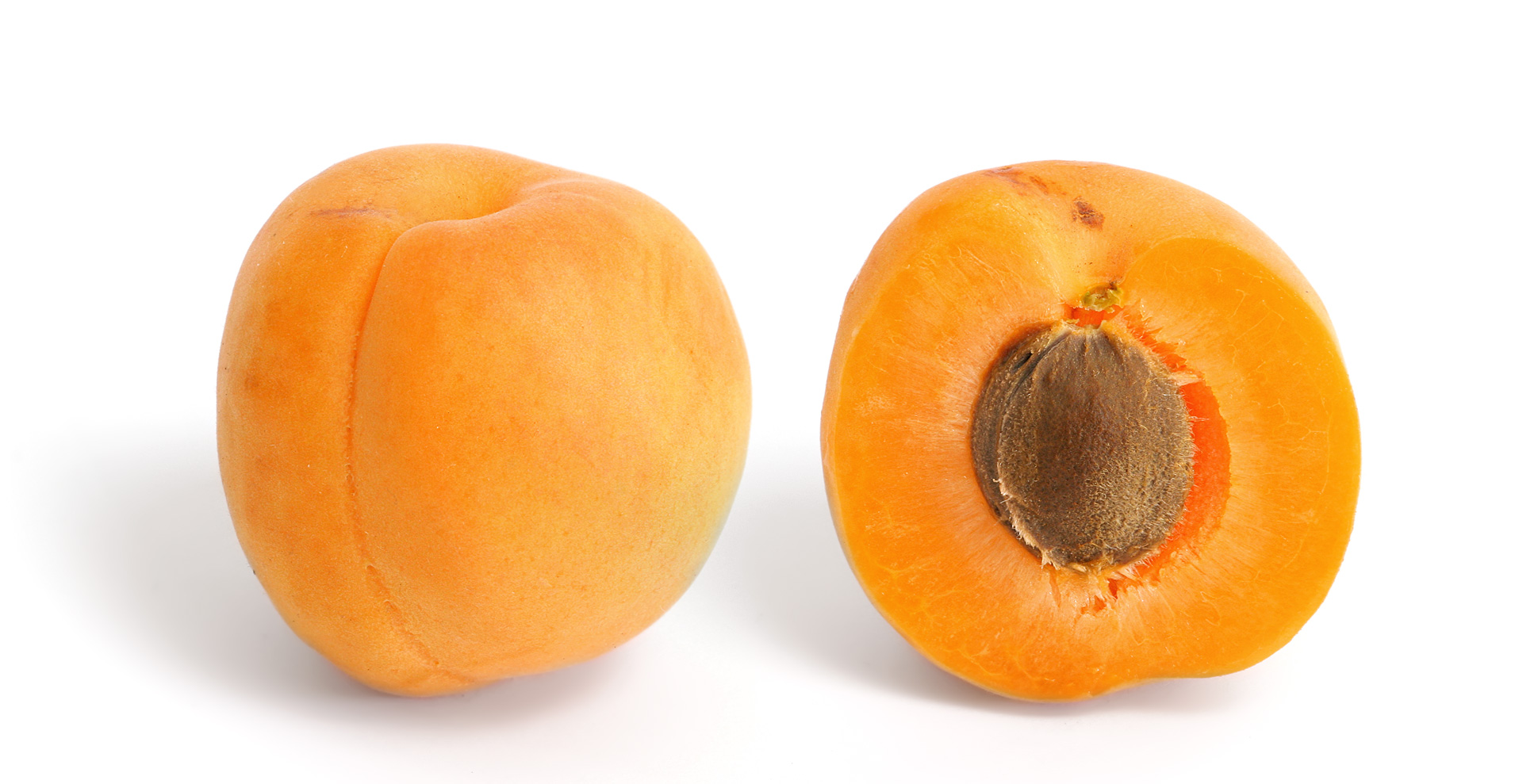
Apricot and its cross-section

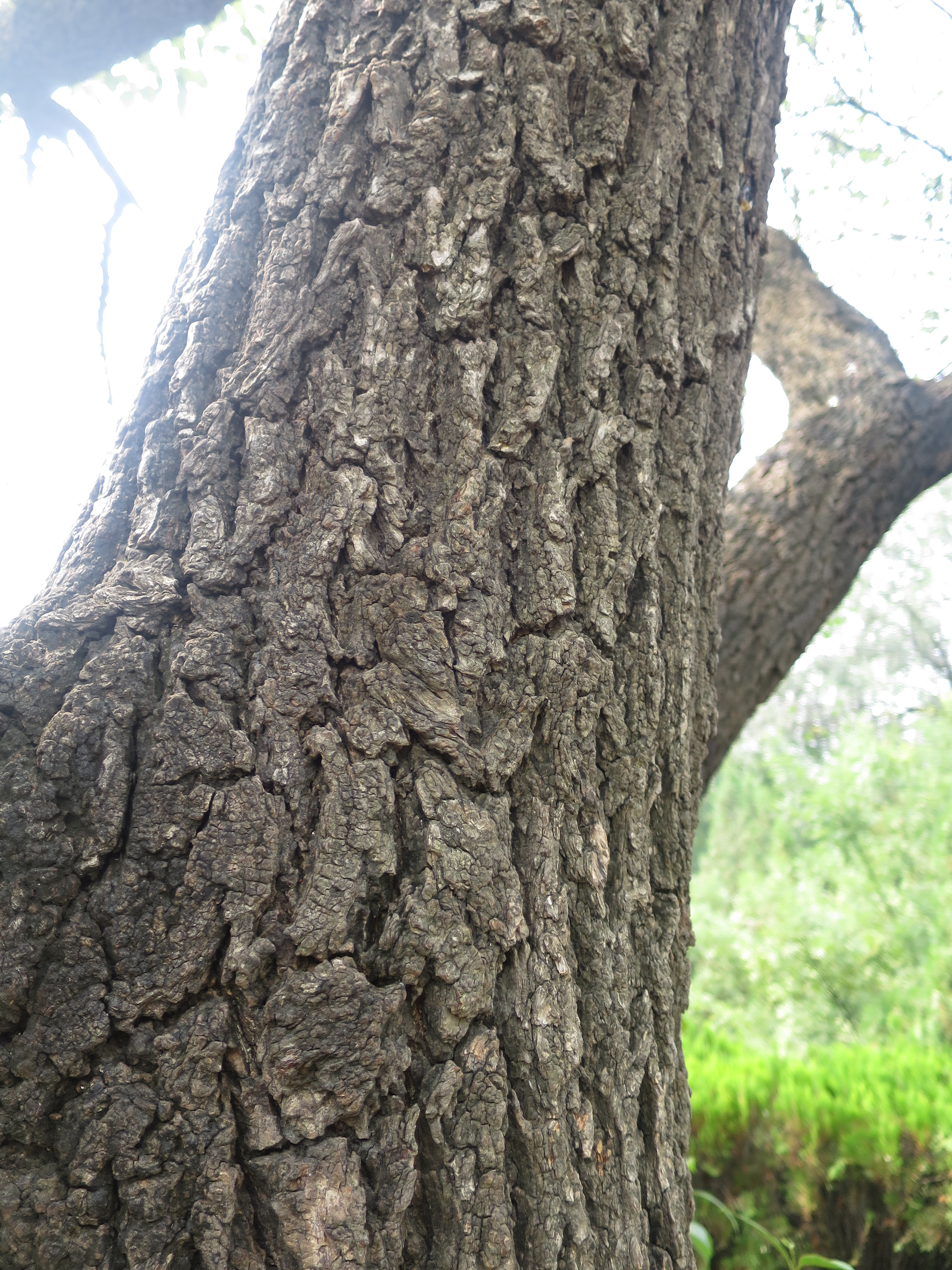
Bark from an old species in Luoyang

== Varieties ==
According to the Catalogue of Life and Flora of China, there are six varieties of P. armeniaca:

- Prunus armeniaca var. ansu – ansu apricot (Japanese: アンズ, anzu), pink-flowered, East Asia
- Prunus armeniaca var. armeniaca – common apricot, Central Asia and China, widely cultivated
- Prunus armeniaca var. holosericea – Tibetan apricot, Qinghai, Shaanxi, Sichuan, and Tibet
- Prunus armeniaca var. meixianensis – Mei County apricot, double-flowered, Shaanxi
- Prunus armeniaca var. xiongyueensis – Xiongyue apricot, Liaoning
- Prunus armeniaca var. zhidanensis – Zhidan apricot, Ningxia, Qinghai, Shaanxi, and Shanxi

== Cultivation and uses ==
=== Origin, domestication and diffusion ===
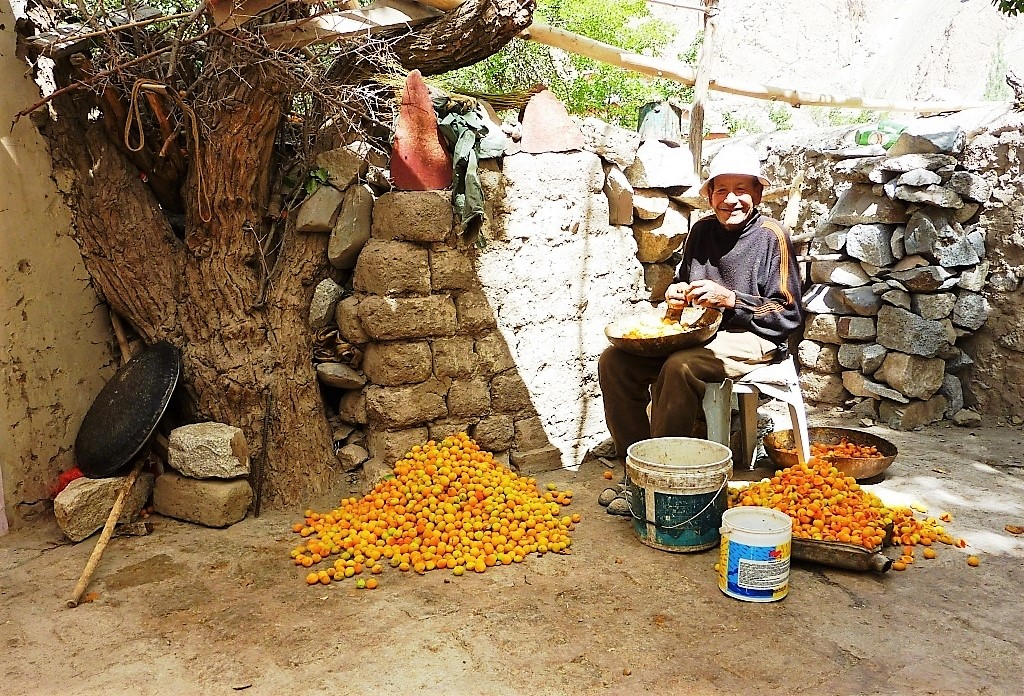
Preparing apricots in the grounds of Alchi Monastery, Ladakh, India

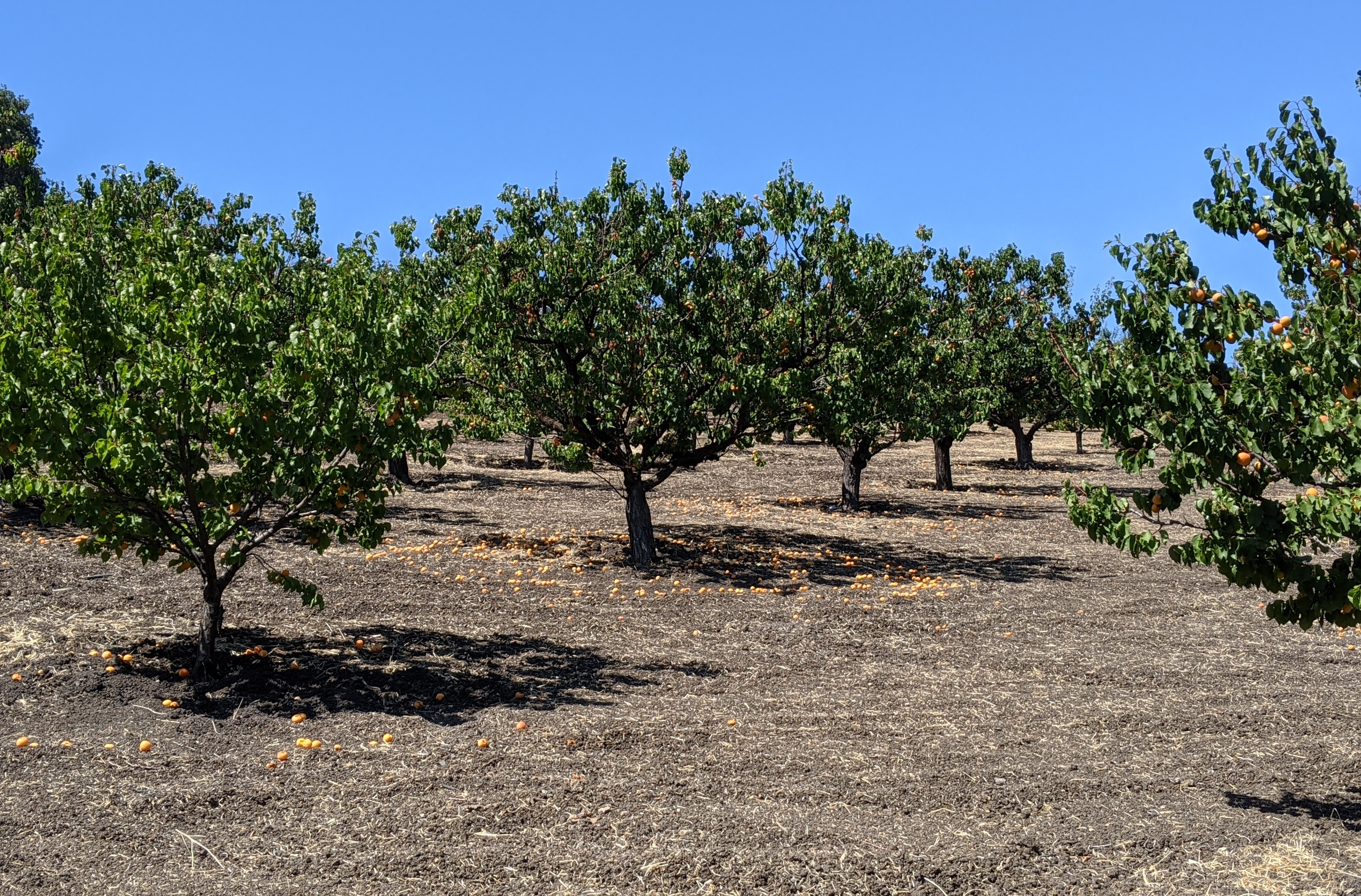
David Packard's apricot orchard in Los Altos Hills, preserved by the David and Lucile Packard Foundation, is one of the few remaining in Santa Clara County, where apricots were a major crop before the urban sprawl of Silicon Valley.

According to the Soviet botanist Nikolai Vavilov, the center of origin of P. armeniaca is Central Asia, where its domestication would have taken place, and China is another center of domestication. His hypothesis has been confirmed by genetic studies.

There were at least three independent domestication events in the demographic history of P. armeniaca:

- The one from the wild populations in southern Central Asia (Kyrgyzstan) gave rise to the cultivated apricot in southern Central Asia and northern South Asia.
- The one from the wild populations in northern Central Asia (Kazakhstan) gave rise to the cultivated apricot in northern Central Asia, West Asia (including Armenia), Europe and North Africa.
- The third one occurred in China and gave rise to cultivated apricot in East Asia. It involved the wild populations from northern Central Asia, and the kernel-using varieties have introgression from P. sibirica.

The cultivated apricot diffused westward by two main routes: one is Central Asia → West Asia → Mediterranean Europe & North Africa, and the other is Central Asia → continental Europe. In addition, the cultivated apricot from Japan had a minor contribution to that in Mediterranean Europe.

=== History of cultivation ===
==== Eastern Eurasia ====
The earliest archaeological evidence for apricots comes from the Kuahuqiao site (6,000–5,400 BCE) in East China. Beginning in about the seventh century, apricots in China have been preserved by various methods, including salting and smoking, and the more common drying. Hubei is noted for its black smoked apricots.

Archaeological evidence shows that apricot cultivation had occurred in Kashmir by the 2nd millennium BCE.

==== Western Eurasia and the Mediterranean region ====
Apricot stones from the Chalcolithic era have been found at Garni and Shengavit in Armenia. The common apricot was known in Armenia during ancient times, and has been cultivated there for so long that it was previously thought to have originated there. Its scientific name Prunus armeniaca (Armenian plum) derives from that assumption. For example, Belgian arborist Baron de Poerderlé, writing in the 1770s, asserted, "Cet arbre tire son nom de l'Arménie, province d'Asie, d'où il est originaire et d'où il fut porté en Europe ..." ("this tree takes its name from Armenia, province of Asia, where it is native, and whence it was brought to Europe ..."). A large variety of apricots, around 50, are grown in Armenia today.

Apricots have been cultivated in Persia since antiquity, and dried ones were an important commodity on Persian trade routes. Apricots remain an important fruit in modern-day Iran.

Syrians usually dry apricots, add sweetener, and then use them to make a drink called amar al-dīn.

Its introduction to Greece is attributed to Alexander the Great.

An article on Apricot cultivation in Andalusia of Spain is brought down in Ibn al-'Awwam's 12th-century agricultural work, Book on Agriculture.

In England during the 17th century, apricot oil was used in herbalism treatments intended to act against tumors, swelling, and ulcers.

In the 17th century, English settlers brought the apricot to the English colonies in the New World. Most of modern American production of apricots comes from the seedlings carried to the West Coast by Spanish missionaries. Almost all U.S. commercial production is in California, with some in Washington and Utah.

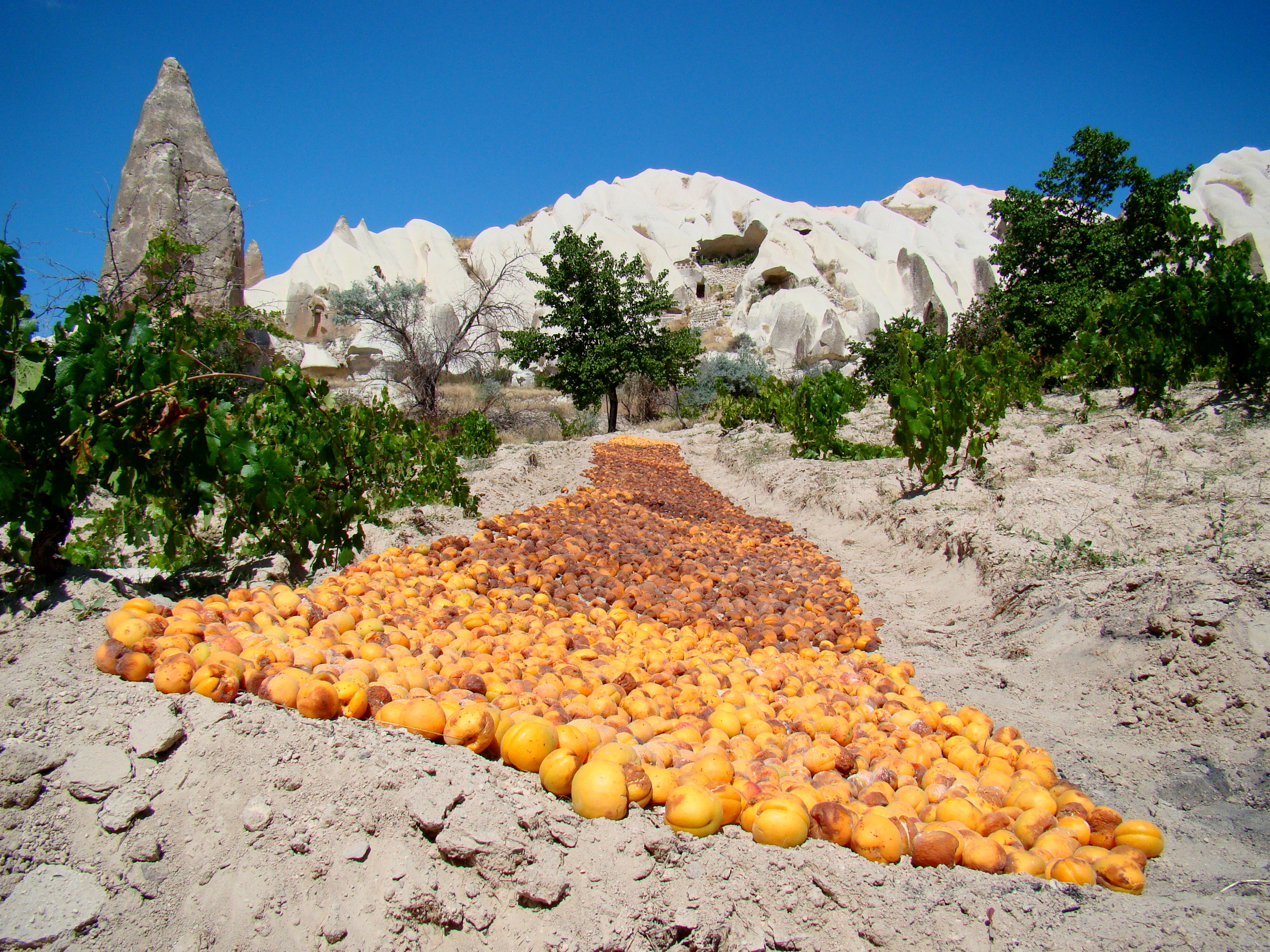
Apricots drying on the ground in Turkey

=== Uses ===
Seeds or kernels of the apricot grown in central Asia and around the Mediterranean may be substituted for bitter almonds. The Italian liqueur amaretto and amaretti biscotti are flavoured with extract of apricot kernels rather than almonds. Oil pressed from these cultivar kernels, and known as oil of almond, has been used as cooking oil. Kernels contain between 2.05% and 2.40% hydrogen cyanide, but consumption after proper processing is sufficient to reduce harmful effects.

== Etymology ==
The scientific name armeniaca was first used by Gaspard Bauhin in his Pinax Theatri Botanici (page 442), referring to the species as Mala armeniaca "Armenian apple". It is sometimes stated that this came from Pliny the Elder, but it was not used by Pliny. Linnaeus took up Bauhin's epithet in the first edition of his Species Plantarum in 1753.

The name apricot is probably derived from a tree mentioned as praecocia by Pliny. Pliny says "We give the name of apples (mala) ... to peaches (persica) and pomegranates (granata) ..." Later in the same section he states "The Asiatic peach ripens at the end of autumn, though an early variety (praecocia) ripens in summer – these were discovered within the last thirty years ...".

The classical authors connected Greek armeniaca with Latin praecocia: Pedanius Dioscorides' " ... Ἀρμενιακὰ, Ῥωμαιστὶ δὲ βρεκόκκια" and Martial's "Armeniaca, et praecocia latine dicuntur". Putting together the Armeniaca and the Mala obtains the well-known epithet, but there is no evidence the ancients did it; Armeniaca alone meant the apricot. Nonetheless, the 12th century Andalusian agronomist Ibn al-'Awwam refers to the species in the title of chapter 40 of his Kitab al-Filaha as والتفاح الارمني, "apple from Armenia", stating that it is the same as المشمش or البرقوق ("al-mishmish" or "al-barqūq").

Accordingly, the American Heritage Dictionary under apricot derives praecocia from praecoquus, "cooked or ripened beforehand" [in this case meaning early ripening], becoming Greek πραικόκιον praikókion "apricot" and Arabic البرقوق al-barqūq, a term that has been used for a variety of different members of the genus Prunus (it currently refers primarily to the plum in most varieties of Arabic, but some writers use it as a catchall term for Prunus fruit).

The English name comes from earlier "abrecock" in turn from the Middle French abricot, from Catalan abercoc in turn from Spanish albaricoque. The Spanish albaricoque were adaptation of the Arabic البرقوق (al-barqūq), dating from the Moorish rule of Spain. Al-barquq in its turn comes from the Aramaic/Syriac word of barquqyo.

However, in Argentina and Chile the word for "apricot" is damasco, which could indicate that, to the Spanish settlers of these countries, the fruit was associated with Damascus in Syria. The word damasco is also the word for "apricot" in Portuguese (both European and Brazilian, though in Portugal the words alperce and albricoque are also used).

== In culture ==
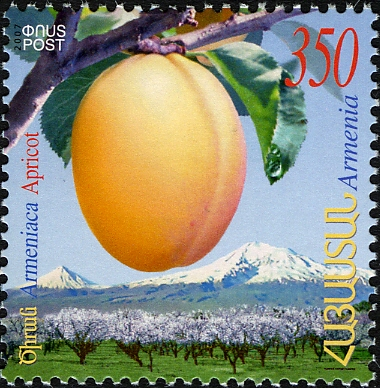
An Armenian stamp featuring Prunus armeniaca.

The Chinese associate the apricot with education and medicine. For instance, the classical word 杏壇 (literally: 'apricot altar') which means "educational circle", is still widely used in written language. Zhuangzi, a Chinese philosopher in the 4th century BCE, told a story that Confucius taught his students in a forum surrounded by the wood of apricot trees. The association with medicine in turn comes from the common use of apricot kernels as a component in traditional Chinese medicine, and from the story of Dong Feng (董奉), a physician during the Three Kingdoms period, who required no payment from his patients except that they plant apricot trees in his orchard on recovering from their illnesses, resulting in a large grove of apricot trees and a steady supply of medicinal ingredients. The term "Expert of the Apricot Grove" (杏林高手) is still used as a poetic reference to physicians.

The apricot is the national fruit of Armenia and the wood of the apricot tree is used for making wood carvings such as the duduk, which is a popular wind instrument in Armenia and is also called "apricot pipe" (Armenian: ծիրանափող, romanized: ciranap'oġ). Several hand-made souvenirs are also made from the apricot wood. The colour is used on the flag of Armenia.

== See also ==
- Barack (brandy)
- List of apricot diseases
- Peacotum, peach-apricot-plum hybrids
- Pluot, various apricot-plum hybrids, mostly involving P. armeniaca
- Prunus dasycarpa, "black apricot" or "purple apricot", a P. armeniaca hybrid
