= Apricot brandy =

Alcoholic Beverage

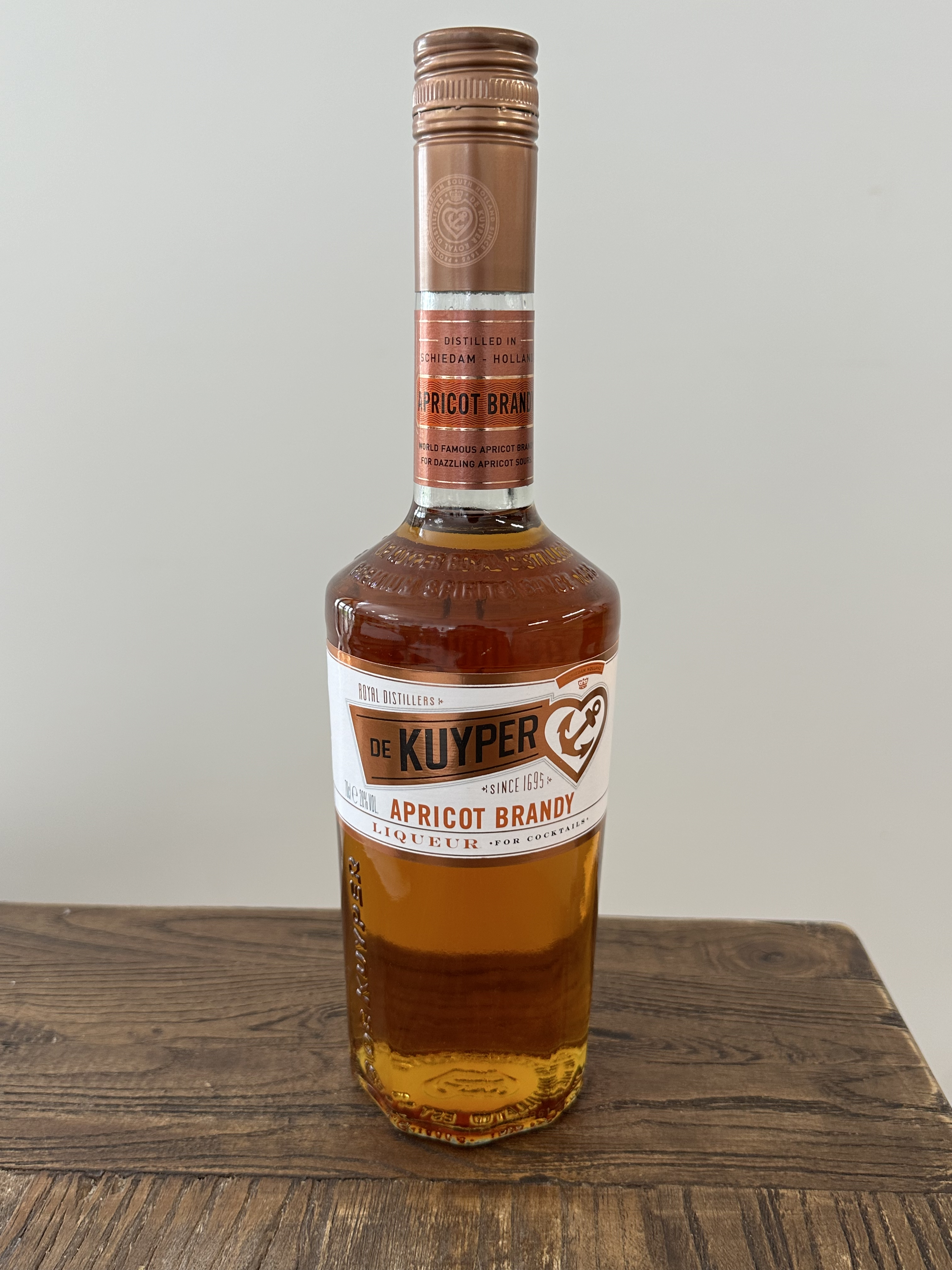
De Kuyper Apricot Brandy

Apricot brandy can refer to a liquor (or Eau de Vie) distilled from fermented apricot juice or a liqueur made from apricot flesh and kernels.

One method of production involves using a pound of loaf sugar for every pound of apricots, which should not yet be ripe. The apricots then need to be covered by water, boiled and then simmered so that their skins can be removed. The sugar then needs to be clarified and boiled, and poured over the fruit. This should be left for a day, before being bottled and filled with equal parts syrup and brandy. It should then be corked and left for twelve months before use.

It can be used as in ingredient in baking.

== Brands ==
Various brands of both types of products exist, including:

- Apricot Vodka (Azerbaijani Language: ərik arağı. Armenian Language: Ծիրանի օղի (Tsirani oghi)), from Azerbaijan and Armenia, Distilled from Fermented Apricots
- Zwack Kecskeméti Barack Pálinka, from Kecskemét, Hungary, a true Apricot Brandy (or Eau de Vie) made from fermented Apricot juice
- Marillenschnaps or Marillenbrand, also an Eau de Vie made from apricots; it is produced mainly in the Wachau region of Austria
- Maraska Apricot, from Croatia, a liqueur
- Meruňkovice, typical for Moravia region of Czech Republic
- Marie Brizard Apry, from France, a liqueur
- Sweet Lucy, a Bourbon/apricot liqueur mix
- Meaghers apricot Brandy, from Canada, a liqueur
- Apricotine, otherwise known as Créme d'Abricot

== See also ==
- Fruit brandy
- Brandy
- Dried apricot
- Alcohol
