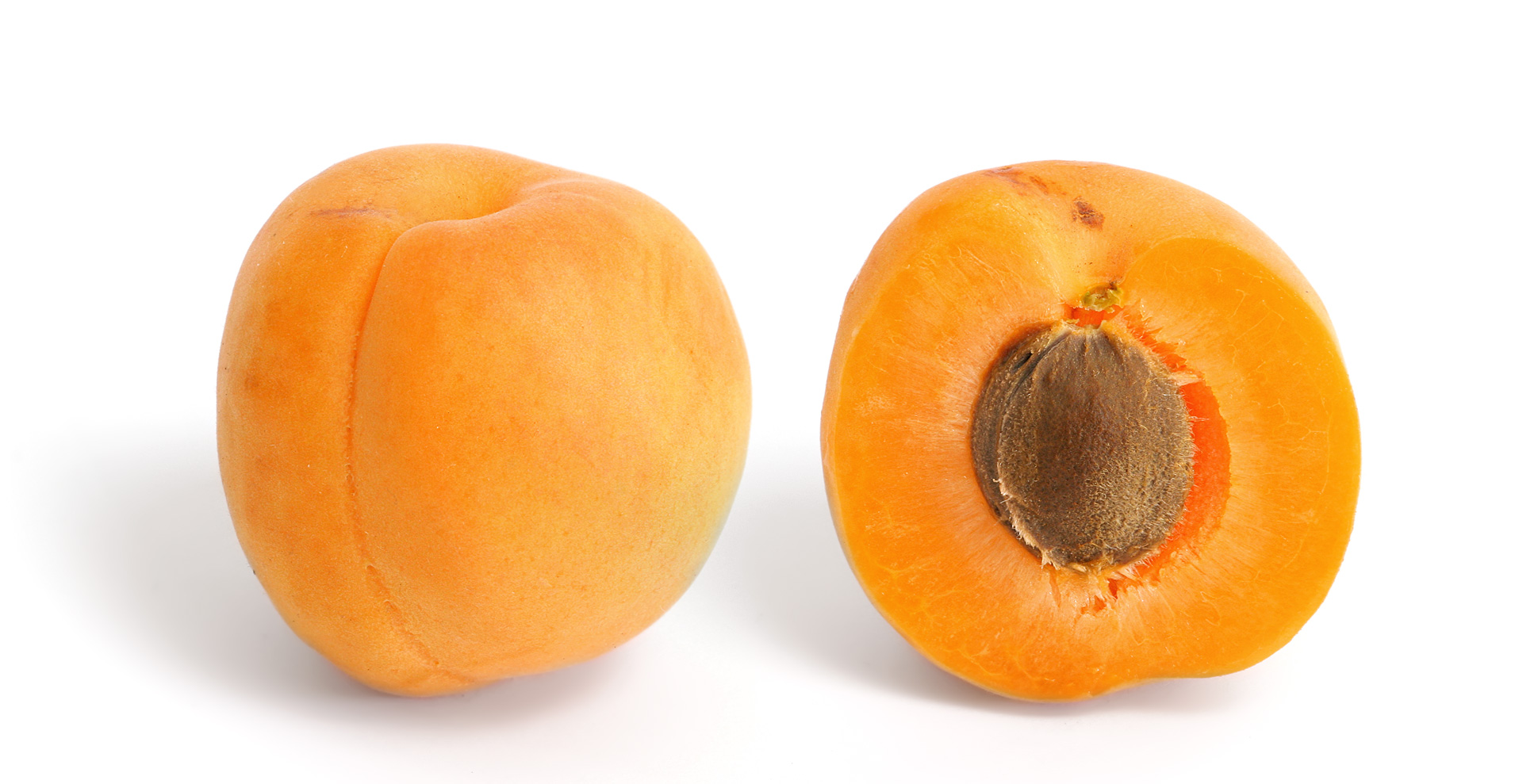
- Apricot and its cross-section

Scientific classification
- Kingdom: Plantae
- Clade: Tracheophytes
- Clade: Angiosperms
- Clade: Eudicots
- Clade: Rosids
- Order: Rosales
- Family: Rosaceae
- Genus: Prunus
- Subgenus: Prunus subg. Prunus
- Section: Prunus sect. Armeniaca (Scop.) Koch

Type species
- Prunus armeniaca L.

Species
- See text.

= Apricot =

Cultivated fruit

An apricot (US: /ˈæprɪkɒt/, UK: /ˈeɪprɪkɒt/) is a fruit, or the tree that bears the fruit, of several species in the genus Prunus. Usually an apricot is from the species Prunus armeniaca, but the fruits of the other species in Prunus sect. Armeniaca are also called apricots. In 2023, world production of apricots was 3.7 million tonnes, led by Turkey with 20% of the total.

Prunus armeniaca was domesticated in ancient times in Central Asia and China. Cultivation of the tree then spread across Eurasia and to North Africa and Japan. The fruit is consumed both fresh and dried. Apricots are used in dishes including cakes, tarts, and jam, and in savoury dishes, for example in stuffing. In Austria, they are the basis of Marillenknödel, sweet apricot dumplings.

== Etymology ==
Apricot first appeared in English in the 16th century as abrecock from the Middle French aubercot or later abricot, from Spanish albaricoque and Catalan a(l)bercoc, in turn from Arabic الْبَرْقُوق (al-barqūq, 'the plums'), from Byzantine Greek βερικοκκίᾱ (berikokkíā, 'apricot tree'), derived from late Greek πραικόκιον (praikókion, 'apricot') from Latin [persica ('peach')] praecocia (praecoquus, 'early ripening'). The specific epithet armeniaca refers to the country of Armenia.

Map of the etymology of "apricot" from Latin via Late and Byzantine Greek to Arabic, Spanish and Catalan, Middle French, and so to English

== Description ==
The apricot is a small tree, up to 8 metres (26 ft) tall, with a round canopy and a spread similar to its height. The flowers are white or pinkish, about 2 centimetres (0.79 in) wide, appearing before the leaves early in the spring. The fruit is a succulent orange-yellow drupe (a stonefruit) tinged with red. The single seed (kernel or stone) is enclosed in a hard shell (exocarp).

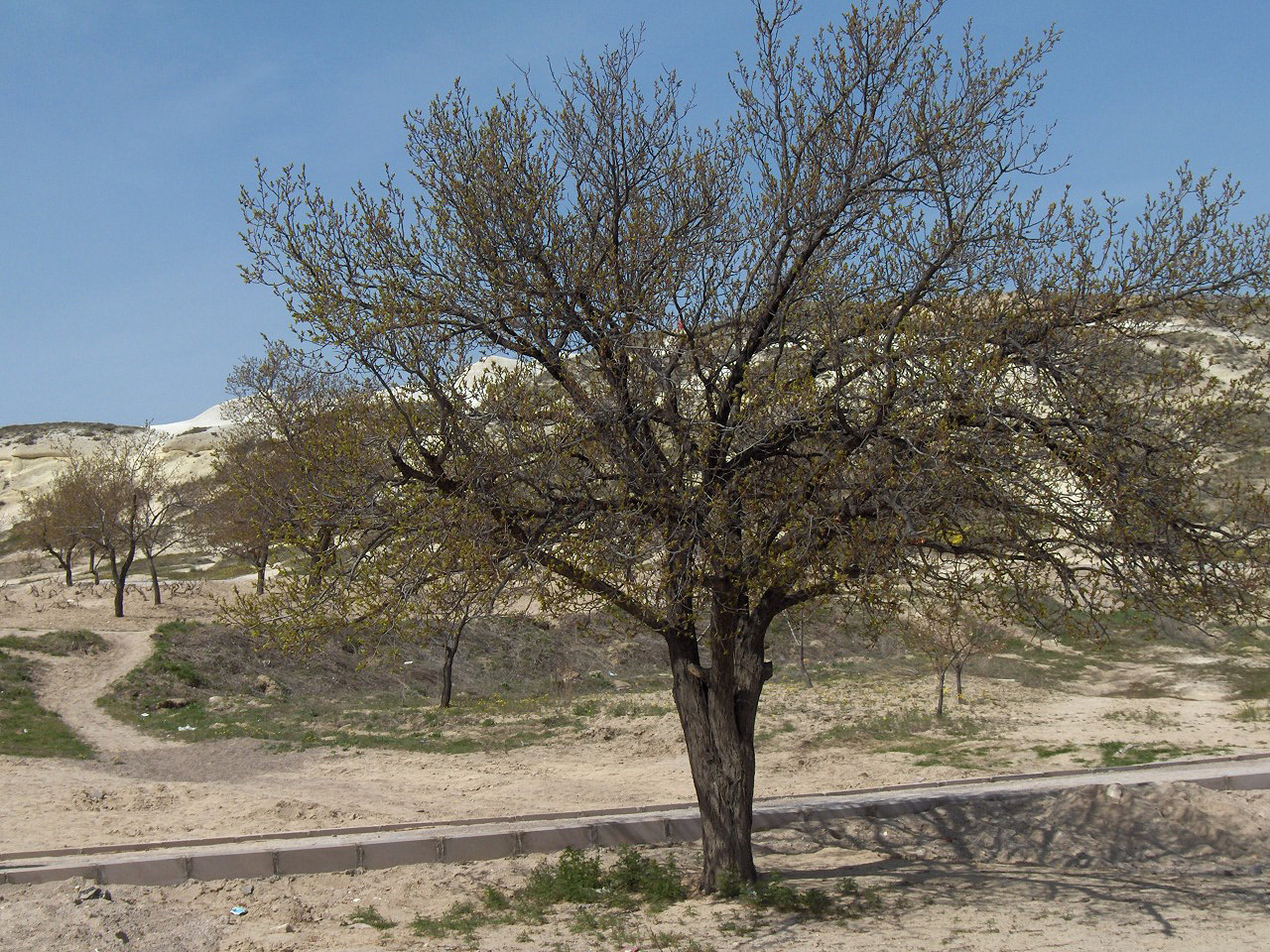
Habit

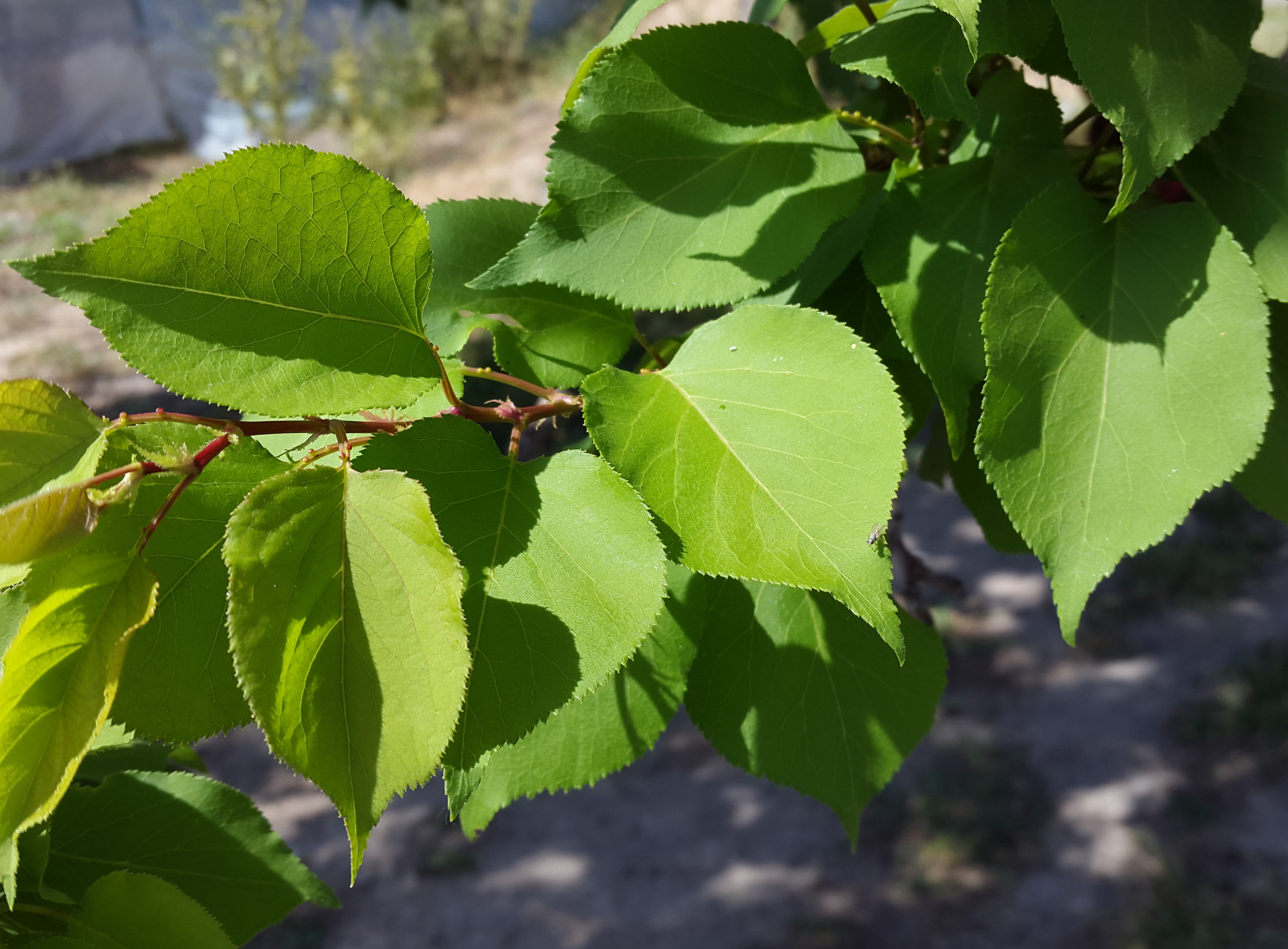
Leaves

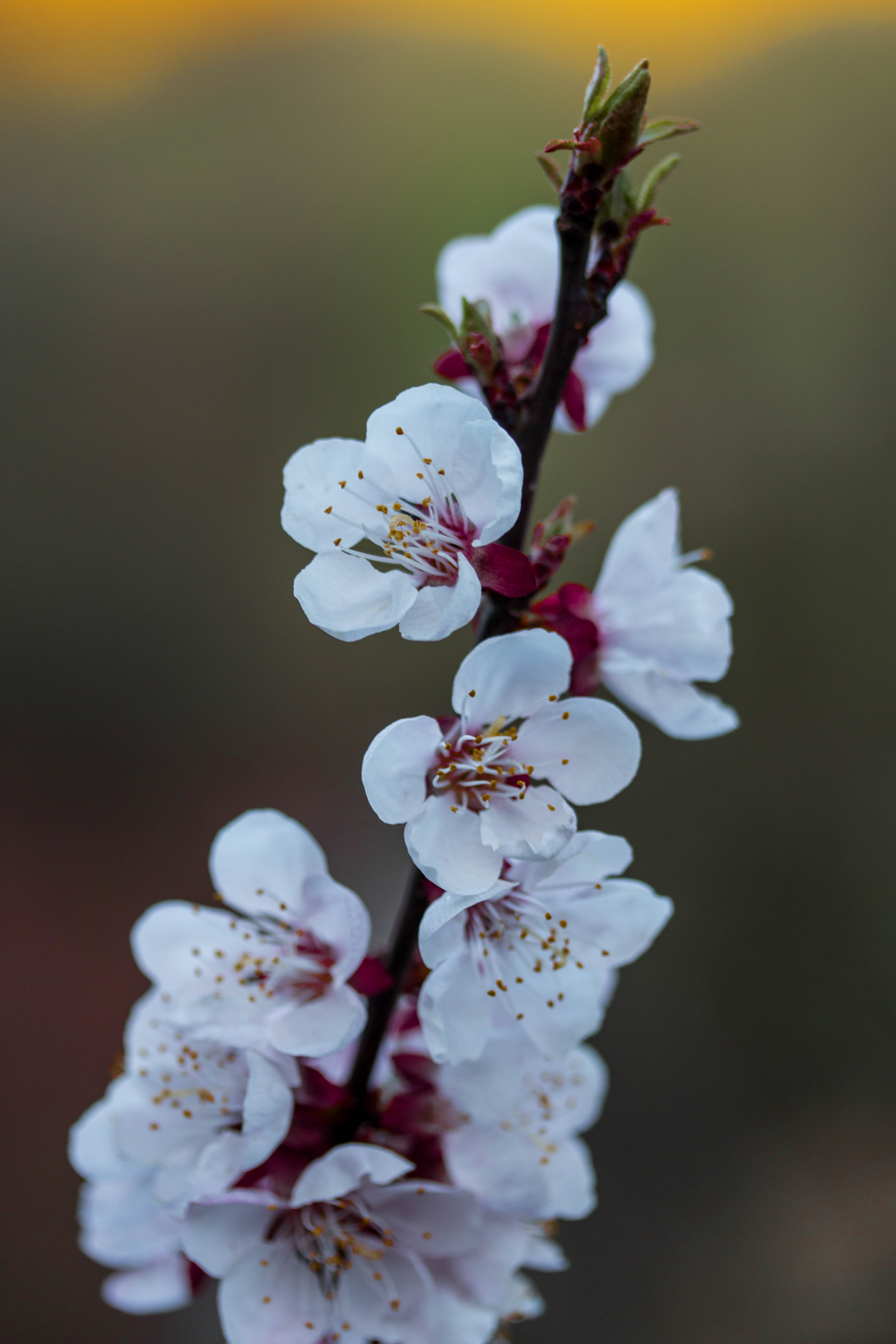
Flowers

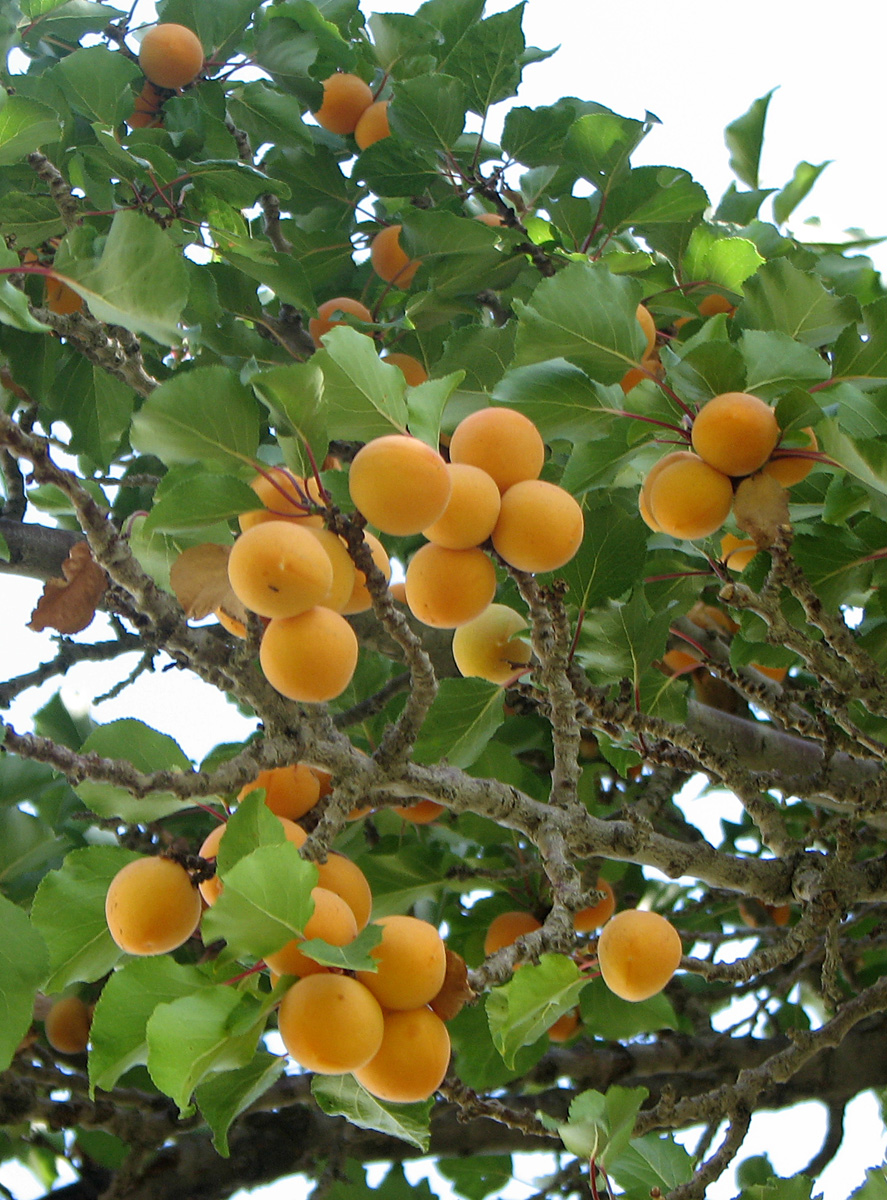
Fruits on tree

== Taxonomy ==
Apricots are species belonging to Prunus sect. Armeniaca. The taxonomic position of P. brigantina is disputed. It is grouped with plum species according to chloroplast DNA sequences, but more closely related to apricot species according to nuclear DNA sequences.

- Prunus armeniaca – common apricot, widely cultivated for its edible fruit and kernel
- Prunus brigantina – Briançon apricot, native to Europe, cultivated for its edible fruit and oil-producing kernel
- Prunus cathayana – native to Hebei
- Prunus × dasycarpa – purple apricot, cultivated in Central Asia and adjacent areas for its edible fruit
- Prunus hongpingensis – Hongping apricot, native to Shennongjia, cultivated for its edible fruit
- Prunus hypotrichodes – native to Chongqing
- Prunus limeixing – cultivated in northern China for its edible fruit
- Prunus mandshurica – Manchurian apricot, native to Northeast Asia, cultivated for its kernel, the fruits of some cultivars edible
- Prunus mume – flowering apricot, native to southern China, widely cultivated for its beautiful blossom and edible fruit
- Prunus sibirica – Siberian apricot, native to Siberia, Mongolia, northern China, and Korea, cultivated for its kernel
- Prunus zhengheensis – Zhenghe apricot, native to Fujian

== Cultivation ==
=== Origin and domestication ===
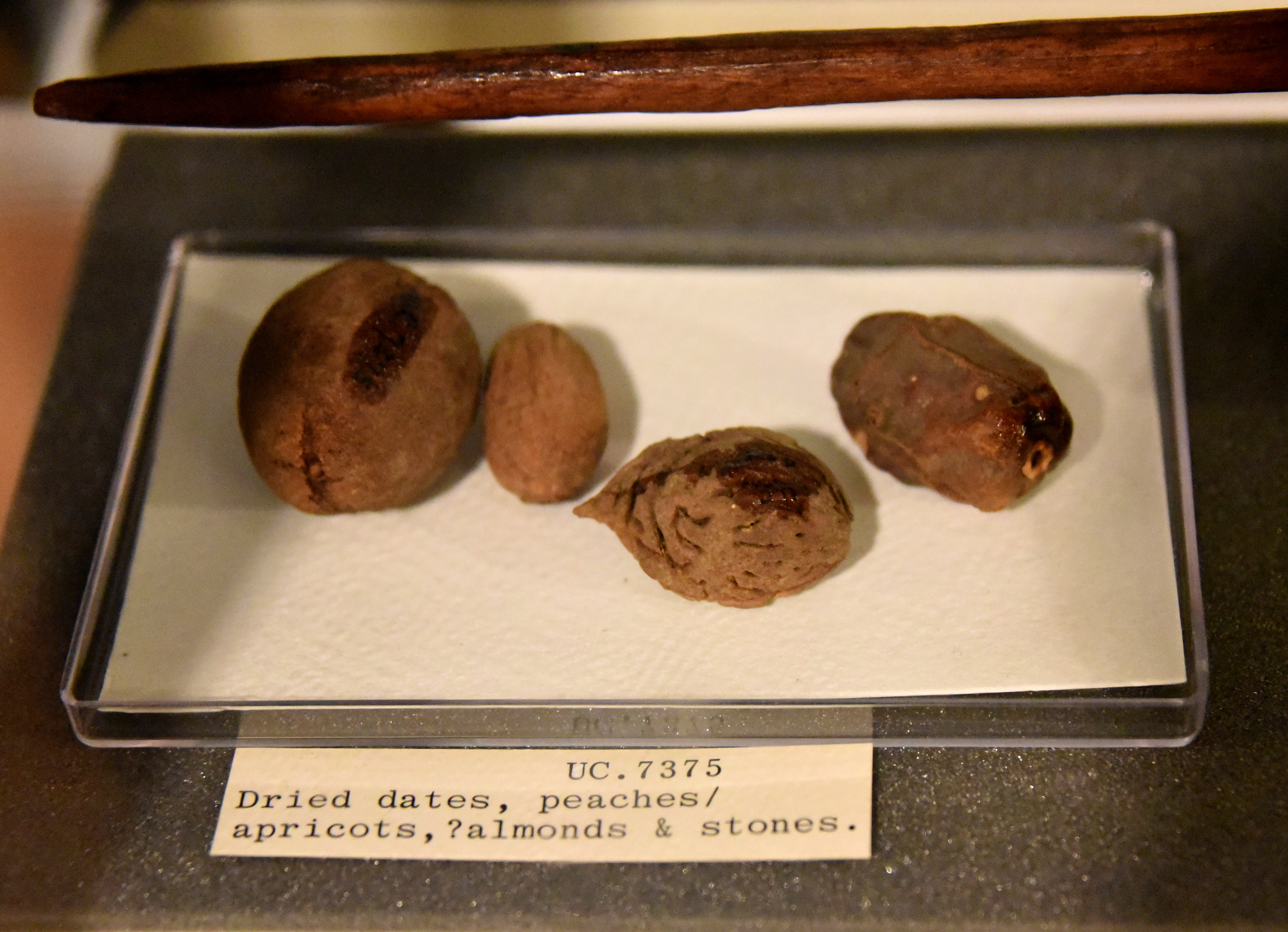
Dried date, peach, apricot, and stones. From Lahun, Fayum, Egypt. Late Middle Kingdom. The Petrie Museum of Egyptian Archaeology

The most commonly cultivated apricot Prunus armeniaca was known in Armenia during ancient times, and has been cultivated there for so long that it was previously thought to have originated there, hence the epithet of its scientific name. However, this is not supported by genetic studies, which instead confirm the hypothesis proposed by Nikolai Vavilov that domestication of P. armeniaca occurred in Central Asia and China. The domesticated apricot then diffused south to South Asia, west to West Asia (including Armenia), Europe and North Africa, and east to Japan. The apricot arrived in southwest Asia from Iran or Armenia during the third century BC. Within a few centuries, cultivation was established across Syria, Turkey, Greece, and Italy.

=== Cultivation practices ===
Apricot trees have a chilling requirement of 300 to 900 chilling units. A dry climate is good for fruit maturation. The tree is slightly more cold-hardy than the peach, tolerating winter temperatures as cold as −30 °C (−22 °F) or lower if healthy, with large differences between cultivars. They are hardy in USDA zones 5 through 8. A limiting factor in apricot culture is spring frosts: They tend to flower very early (in early March in western Europe), and spring frost can kill flowers or before flower buds in different stages of development. Furthermore, the trees are sensitive to temperature changes during the winter season. In China, winters can be very cold, but temperatures tend to be more stable than in Europe and especially North America, where large temperature swings can occur in winter. Hybridization with the closely related Prunus sibirica (Siberian apricot; hardy to −50 °C (−58 °F) but with less palatable fruit) offers options for breeding more cold-tolerant plants. Apricots prefer well-drained soils with a pH of 6.0 to 7.0.

Apricot cultivars are usually grafted onto plum or peach rootstocks. The cultivar scion provides the fruit characteristics, such as flavor and size, but the rootstock provides the growth characteristics of the plant. Some of the more popular US apricot cultivars are 'Blenheim', 'Wenatchee Moorpark', 'Tilton', and 'Perfection'. Some apricot cultivars are self-compatible, so do not require pollinizer trees; others are not: 'Moongold' and 'Sungold', for example, must be planted in pairs so they can pollinate each other.

Plant breeders have created what is known as a "black apricot" or "purple apricot", (Prunus dasycarpa), a hybrid of an apricot and the cherry plum (Prunus cerasifera). Other apricot–plum hybrids are variously called plumcots, apriplums, pluots, or apriums.

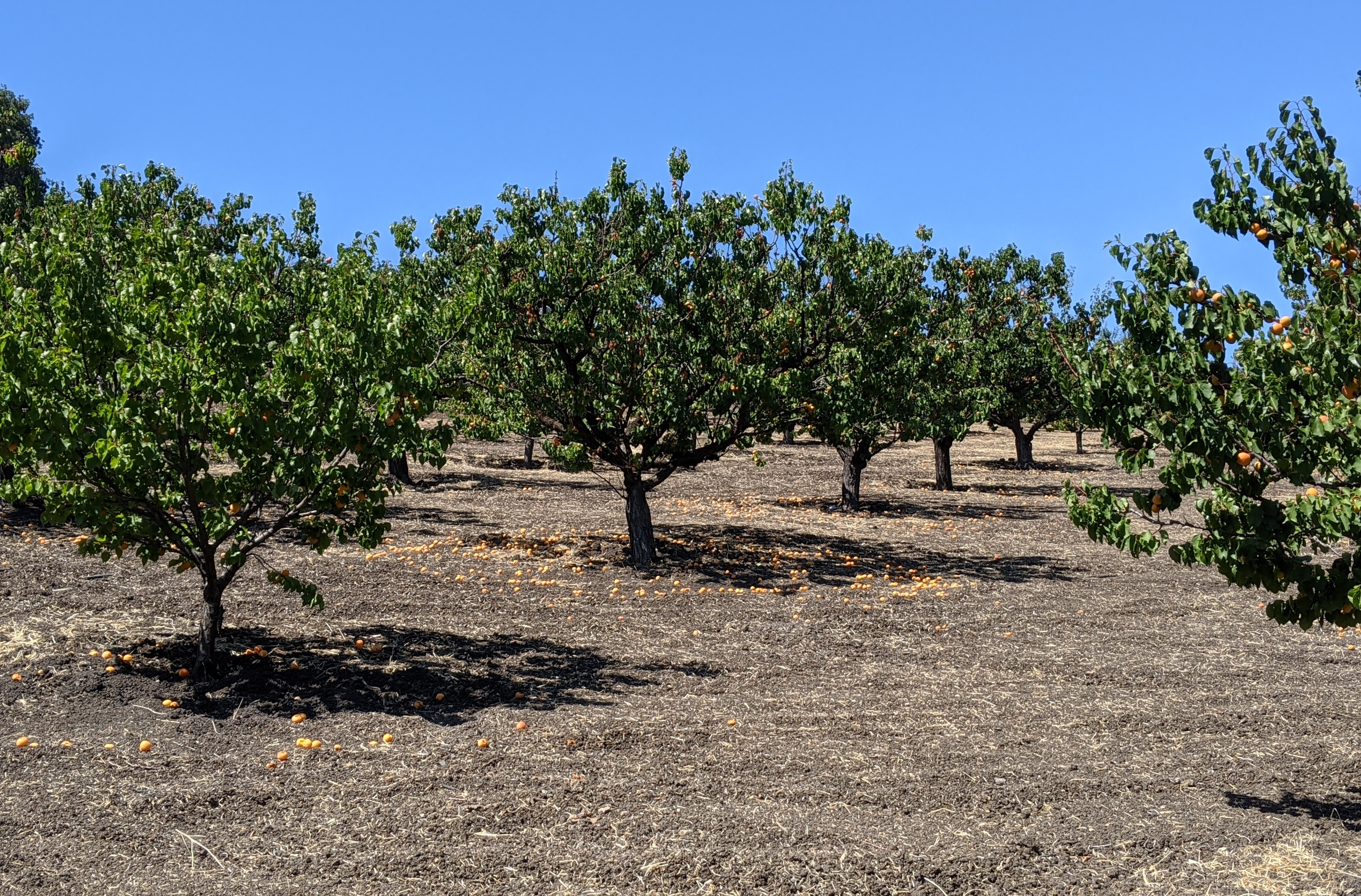
David Packard's apricot orchard in Los Altos Hills, preserved by the David and Lucile Packard Foundation

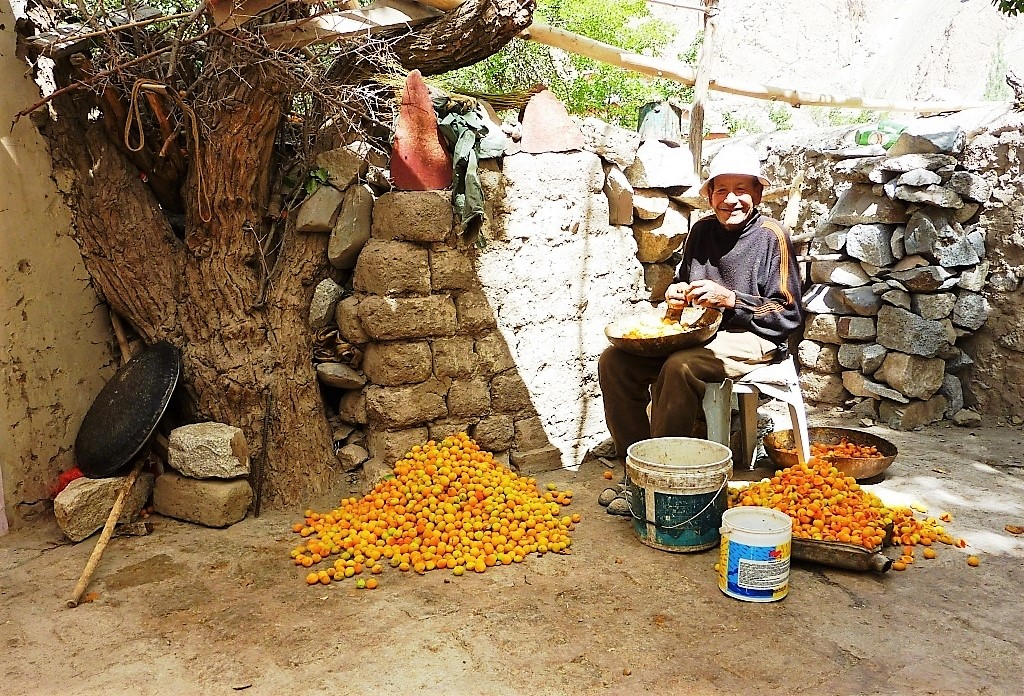
Preparing apricots at Alchi Monastery, Ladakh, India

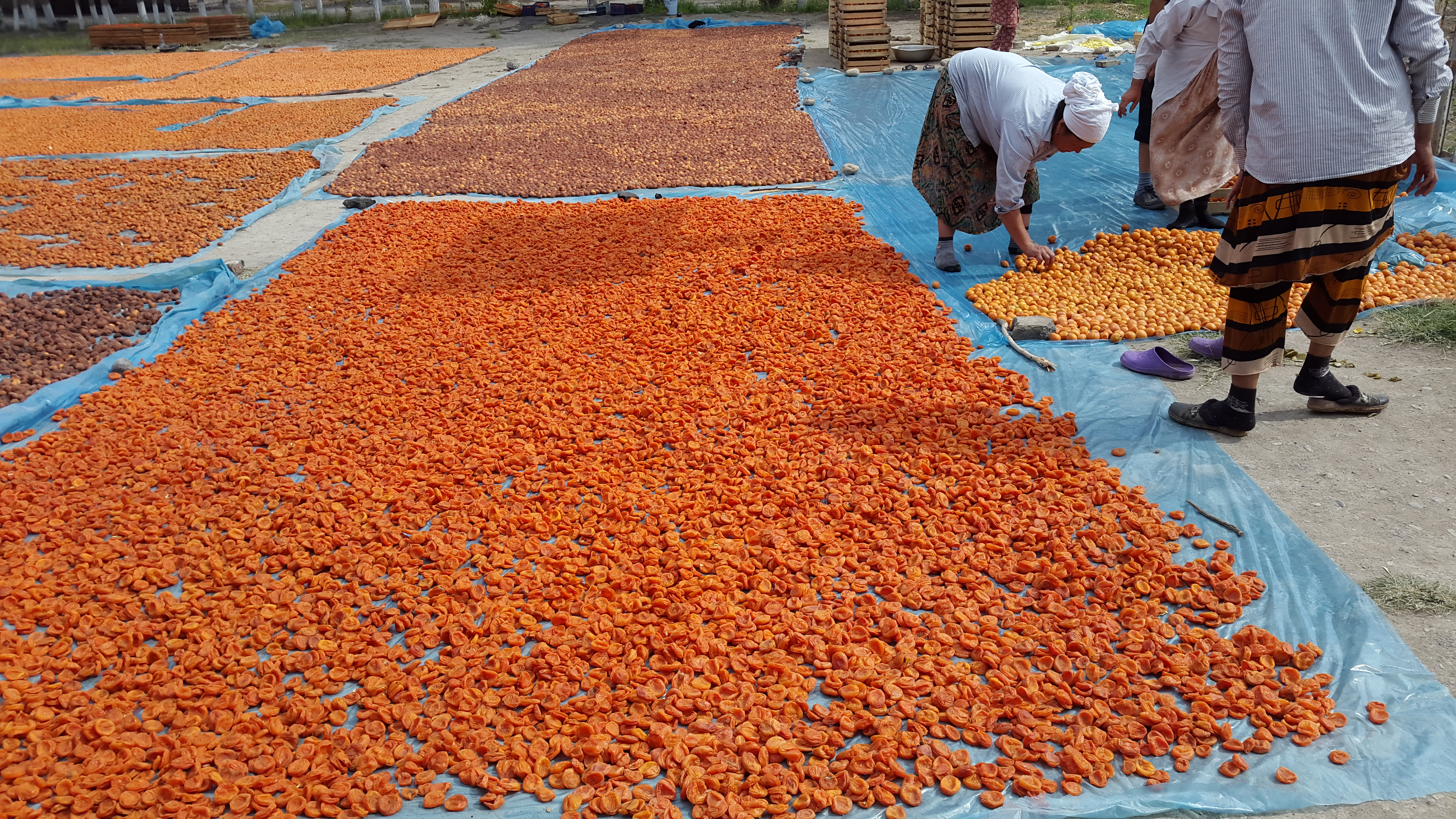
Drying apricots (Fergana, Uzbekistan)

=== Pests and diseases ===
Diseases of apricots vary with climate. In California's hot Central Valley, pit burn, a condition of soft and brown fruit around the pit, is common. Bacterial diseases include bacterial spot and crown gall. Fungal diseases include brown rot caused by Monilinia fructicola late in the season. In periods of heavy rain, the flowers can suffer from blossom wilt where the flowers and young shoots turn brown and die; the twigs die back in a severe attack. Dieback of branches in the summer around pruning wounds can be caused by the fungus Eutypa lata. Other fungal diseases are black knot, Alternaria spot and fruit rot, and powdery mildew. Unlike peaches, apricots are not affected by leaf curl, and bacterial canker (causing sunken patches in the bark, which then spread and kill the affected branch or tree) and silver leaf are not serious threats, which means that pruning in late winter is considered safe.

Apricot production 2023, tonnes
Turkey	750,000
Uzbekistan	500,545
Iran	318,475
Italy	207,190
Algeria	200,566
World	3,728,155
Source: FAOSTAT of the United Nations

=== Production ===
In 2023, world production of apricots was 3.7 million tonnes, led by Turkey with 20% of the total (table). Other major producers (in descending order) were Uzbekistan, Iran, Italy, and Algeria.

Malatya is the center of Turkey's apricot industry.

Production of apricots

Apricot yield

== Toxicity ==
Apricot kernels (seeds) contain amygdalin, a poisonous compound. On average, bitter apricot kernels contain about 5% amygdalin and sweet kernels about 0.9% amygdalin. These values correspond to 0.3% and 0.05% of cyanide. Since a typical apricot kernel weighs 600 mg, bitter and sweet varieties contain, respectively, 1.8 and 0.3 mg of cyanide.

== Uses ==
=== Fruit ===
Fresh apricots can be used in dishes such as cakes and tarts, or made into jam. Dried apricots can be used in similar ways, and included in stuffing for meat dishes, stews, granola, and muesli. In Austrian cuisine, Marillenknödel are dumplings stuffed with apricots, garnished with breadcrumbs fried in butter and dusted with sugar. In Mediterranean cuisine, a cooling drink is made by dissolving apricot paste in water. Barack is a Hungarian apricot brandy.

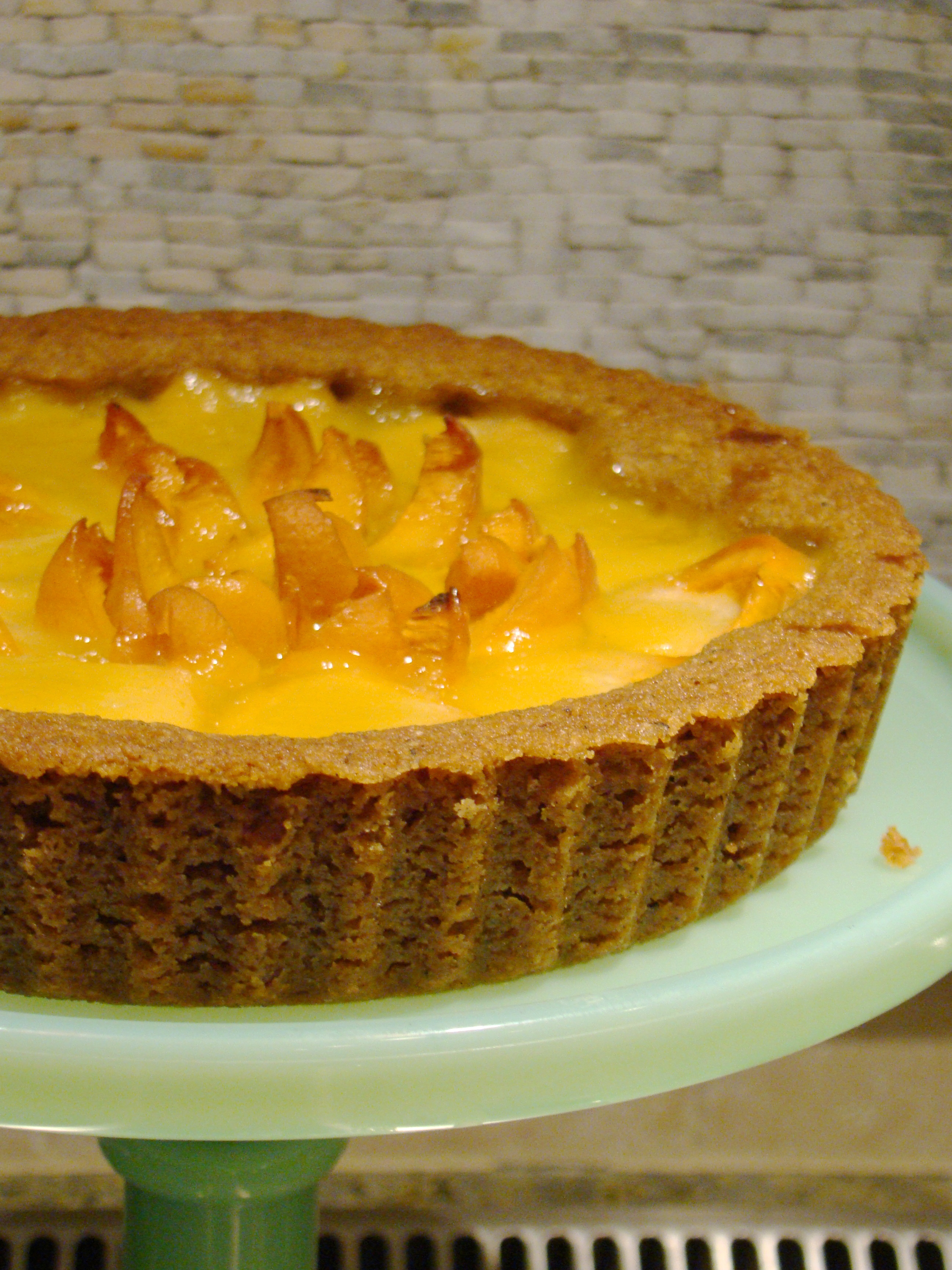
A lemon apricot flower tart

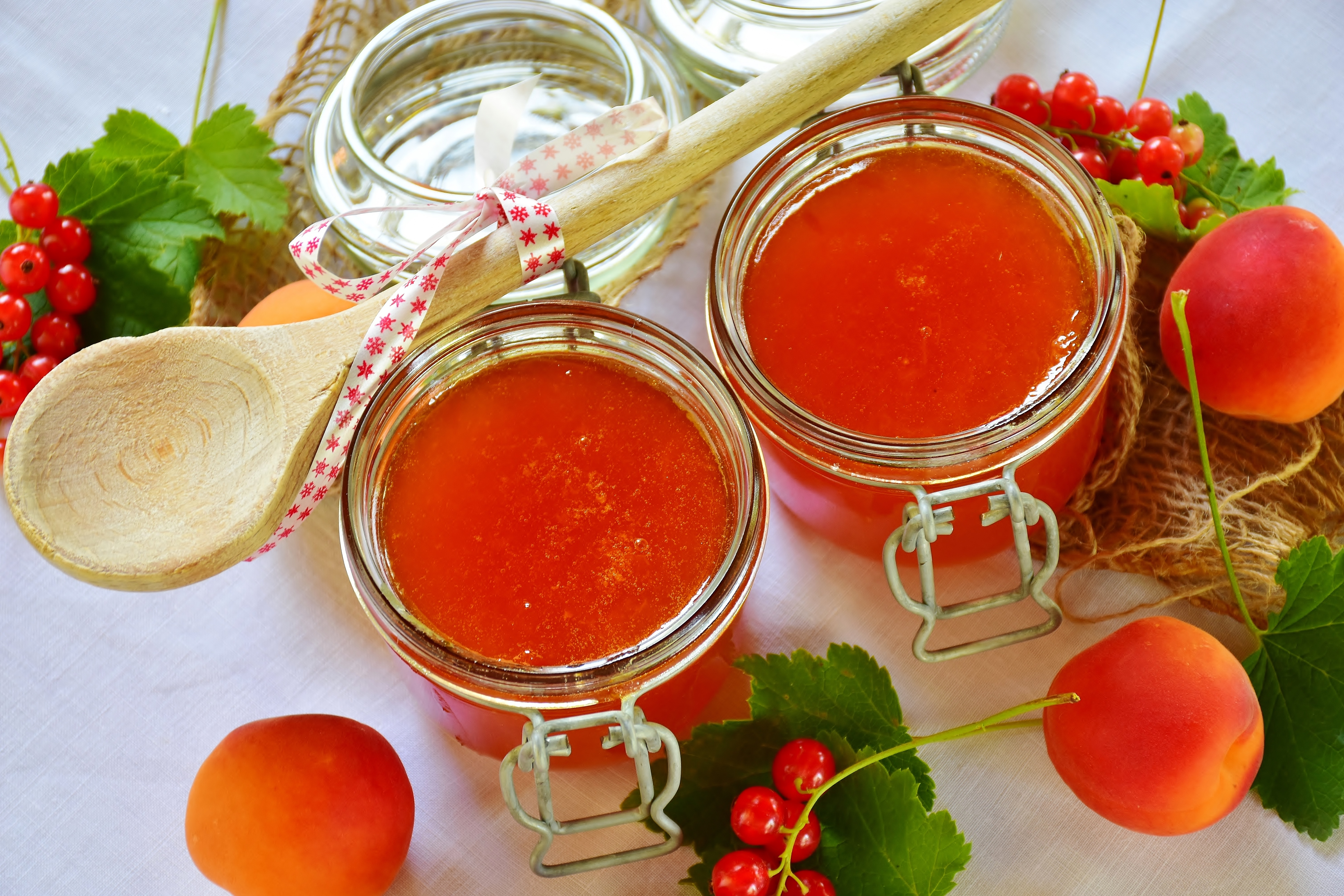
Apricot jam

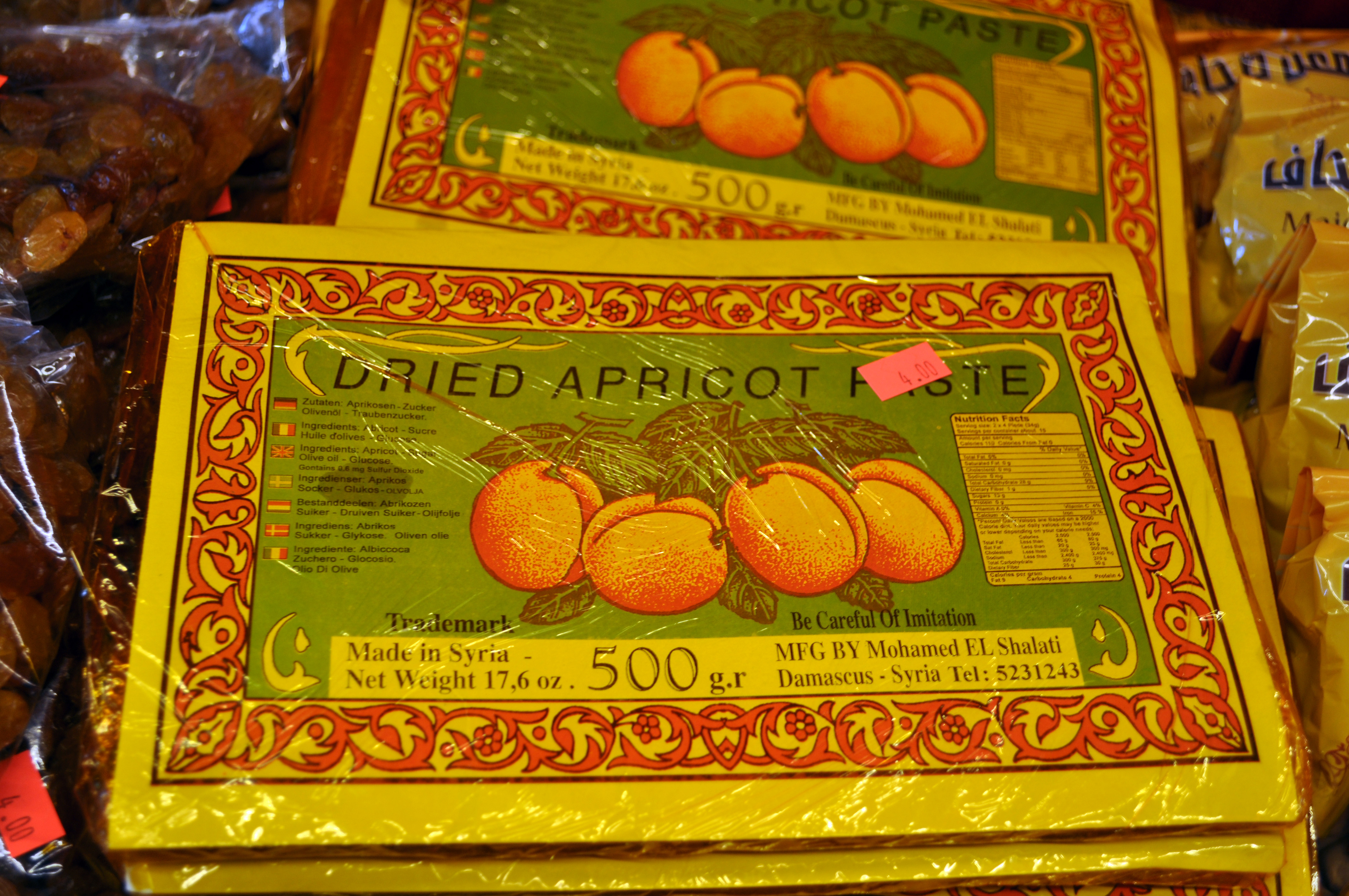
Syrian apricot paste

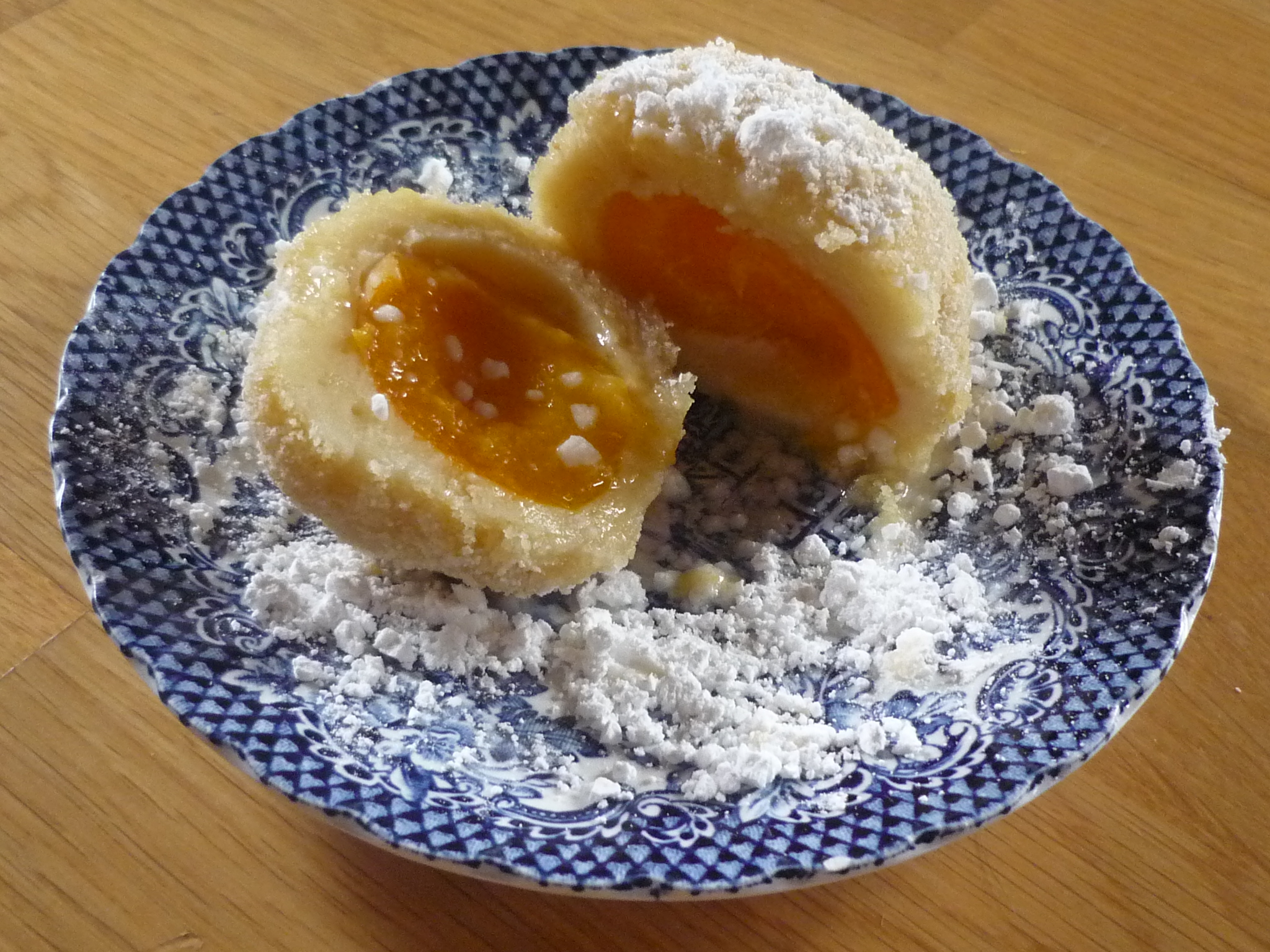
Marillenknödel, Austrian apricot dumpling

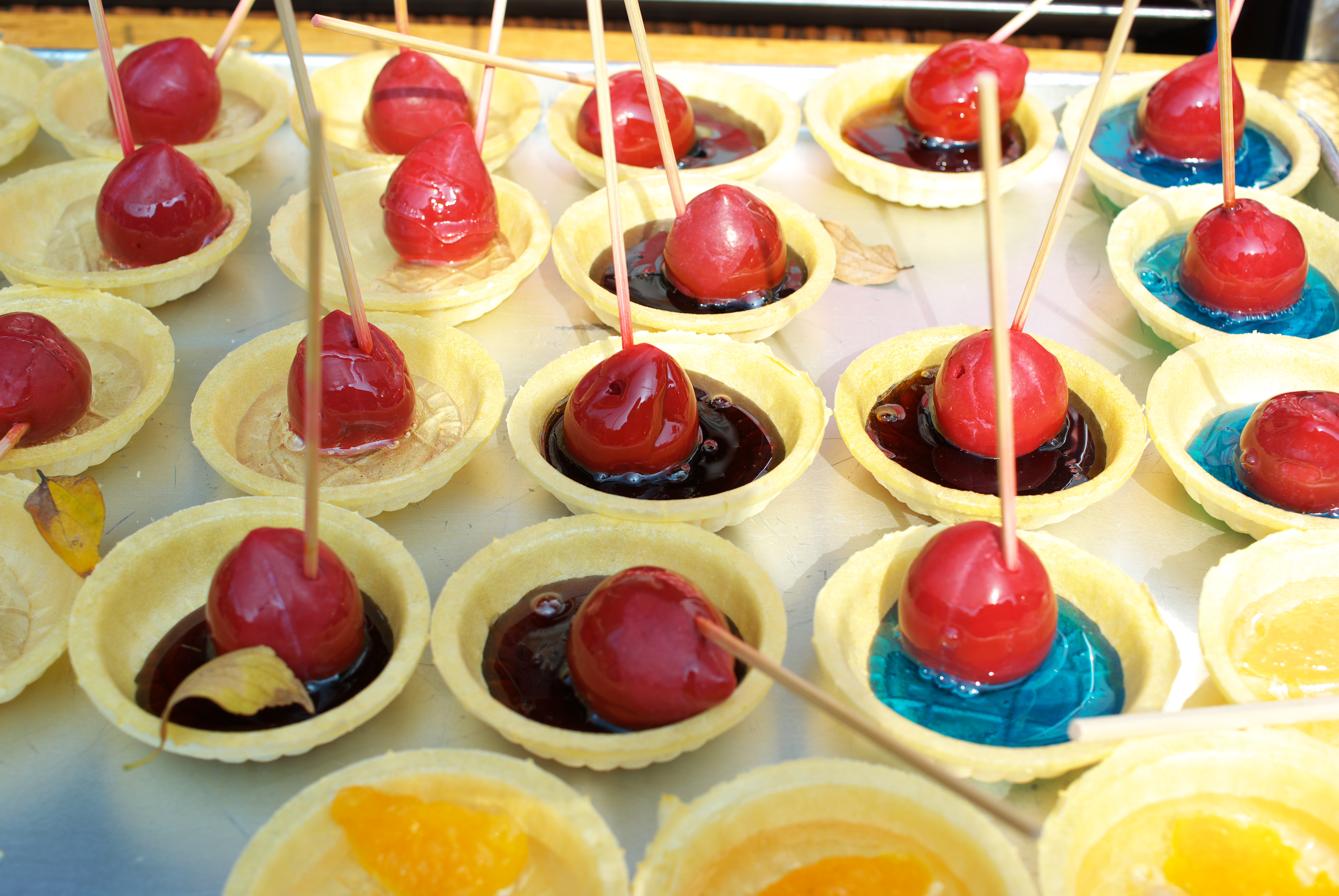
Candied apricots (anzu) on monaka wafers at Jindai-ji Temple in Tokyo, Japan

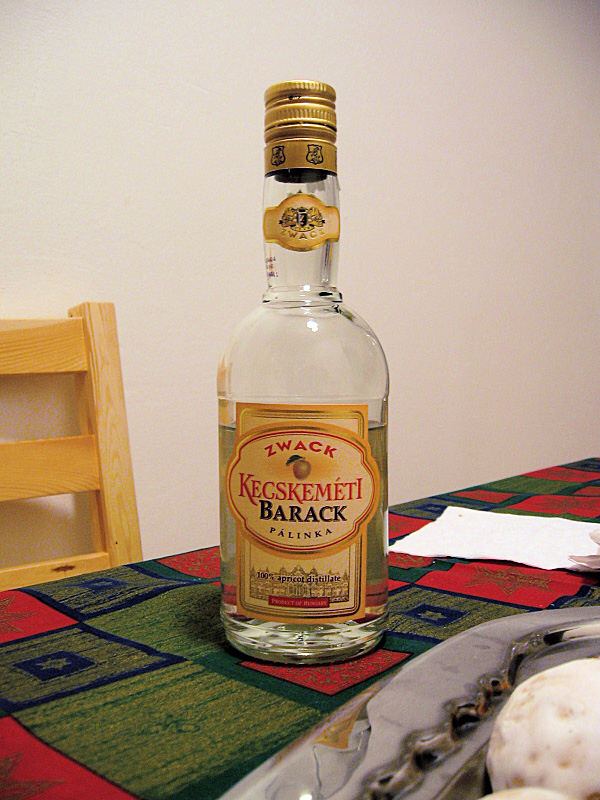
Barack, a Hungarian apricot brandy

=== Kernel ===
Due to their natural amygdalin content, culinary uses for the kernel are limited because of the risk of cyanide poisoning. Oil made from apricot kernels is safe for human consumption without treatment because amygdalin is not oil soluble. Ground up shells are used in cosmetics as an exfoliant. As an exfoliant, it provides an alternative to plastic microbeads. The kernels can be made into a plant milk.

=== Nutrition ===
Apricots, dried
Nutritional value per 100 g (3.5 oz)
- Energy: 1,010 kJ (240 kcal)
- Carbohydrates: 63 g
- Sugars: 53 g
- Dietary fiber: 7 g
- Fat: 0.5 g
- Protein: 3.9 g
Vitamins and minerals
Vitamins	Quantity %DV^{†}
Vitamin A equiv. beta-Carotene	20% 180 μg 20% 2160 μg
Thiamine (B1)	1% 0.015 mg
Riboflavin (B2)	6% 0.074 mg
Niacin (B3)	16% 2.589 mg
Pantothenic acid (B5)	10% 0.516 mg
Vitamin B6	8% 0.143 mg
Folate (B9)	3% 10 μg
Vitamin C	1% 1 mg
Vitamin E	29% 4.33 mg
Vitamin K	3% 3.1 μg
Minerals	Quantity %DV^{†}
Calcium	4% 55 mg
Copper	38% 0.343 mg
Iron	15% 2.66 mg
Magnesium	8% 32 mg
Manganese	10% 0.235 mg
Phosphorus	6% 71 mg
Potassium	39% 1160 mg
Sodium	0% 10 mg
Zinc	3% 0.29 mg
- Other constituents: Quantity
- Water: 31 g
- Link to USDA Database entry
- ^{†}Percentages estimated using US recommendations for adults, except for potassium, which is estimated based on expert recommendation from the National Academies.

Apricots, raw
Nutritional value per 100 g (3.5 oz)
- Energy: 201 kJ (48 kcal)
- Carbohydrates: 11 g
- Sugars: 9 g
- Dietary fiber: 2 g
- Fat: 0.4 g
- Protein: 1.4 g
Vitamins and minerals
Vitamins	Quantity %DV^{†}
Vitamin A equiv. beta-Carotene lutein zeaxanthin	11% 96 μg 10% 1090 μg 89 μg
Thiamine (B1)	3% 0.03 mg
Riboflavin (B2)	3% 0.04 mg
Niacin (B3)	4% 0.6 mg
Pantothenic acid (B5)	5% 0.24 mg
Vitamin B6	3% 0.054 mg
Folate (B9)	2% 9 μg
Vitamin C	11% 10 mg
Vitamin E	6% 0.89 mg
Vitamin K	3% 3.3 μg
Minerals	Quantity %DV^{†}
Calcium	1% 13 mg
Copper	6% 0.056 mg
Iron	2% 0.4 mg
Magnesium	2% 10 mg
Manganese	3% 0.077 mg
Phosphorus	2% 23 mg
Potassium	9% 259 mg
Sodium	0% 1 mg
Zinc	2% 0.2 mg
- Other constituents: Quantity
- Water: 86 g
- Link to USDA Database entry
- ^{†}Percentages estimated using US recommendations for adults, except for potassium, which is estimated based on expert recommendation from the National Academies.

A raw apricot is 86% water, 11% carbohydrates, 1% protein, and less than 1% fat (table). In a reference amount of 100 g (3.5 oz), a raw apricot supplies 48 Calories and is a moderate source of vitamin A and vitamin C (11% each of the Daily Value, DV), with no other micronutrients in significant content (less than 10% DV, table).

=== Phytochemicals ===
Apricots contain phytochemicals, such as polyphenols, including catechins and chlorogenic acid. Taste and aroma compounds include sucrose, glucose, organic acids, terpenes, aldehydes and lactones.

=== Dried apricots ===
Dried apricots are a type of traditional dried fruit. Dried apricots are 31% water, 63% carbohydrates, 4% protein, and contain negligible fat (table). When the water content of apricots is decreased by drying, the mass fraction of micronutrients is increased, such as for vitamin A, vitamin E, copper and potassium, each having higher contents than in raw fruit (DVs above 20%, table).

=== Wood ===
Apricot wood is used for the production of the duduk, an Armenian woodwind instrument.

== In culture ==
The apricot is the national fruit of Armenia, mostly growing in the Ararat plain. It is often depicted on souvenirs.

The Chinese associate the apricot with education and medicine. For instance, the classical word 杏 壇 (literally: "apricot altar") (xìng tán 杏坛) which means "educational circle", is still widely used in written language. Zhuangzi, a Chinese philosopher in the fourth century BC, told a story that Confucius taught his students in a forum surrounded by the wood of apricot trees. The association with medicine in turn comes from the common use of apricot kernels as a component in traditional Chinese medicine, and from the story of Dong Feng (董奉), a physician during the Three Kingdoms period, who required no payment from his patients except that they plant apricot trees in his orchard upon recovering from their illnesses, resulting in a large grove of apricot trees and a steady supply of medicinal ingredients.

The short and unreliable apricot season in Egypt has given rise to the common Egyptian Arabic and Palestinian Arabic expression filmishmish ("in apricot [season]") or bukra filmishmish ("tomorrow in apricot [season]"), uttered as a riposte to an unlikely prediction, or as a rash promise to fulfill a request.

In Middle Eastern and North African cuisines, apricots are used to make Qamar al-Din (lit. "Moon of the faith"), a thick apricot drink that is a popular fixture at Iftar during Ramadan. Qamar al-Din is believed to originate in Damascus, Syria, where the variety of apricots most suitable for the drink was first grown. In Jewish culture, apricots are eaten as part of the Tu BiShvat seder.

In the U.S. Marines it is considered exceptionally bad luck to eat or possess apricots, especially near tanks. This superstition has been documented since at least the Vietnam War and is often cited as originating in World War II. Even calling them by their name is considered unlucky, so they are instead called "cots", "Forbidden fruit" or "A-fruit".

American astronauts ate dried apricot on the Apollo 15 and Apollo 17 missions to the moon.

== Gallery ==
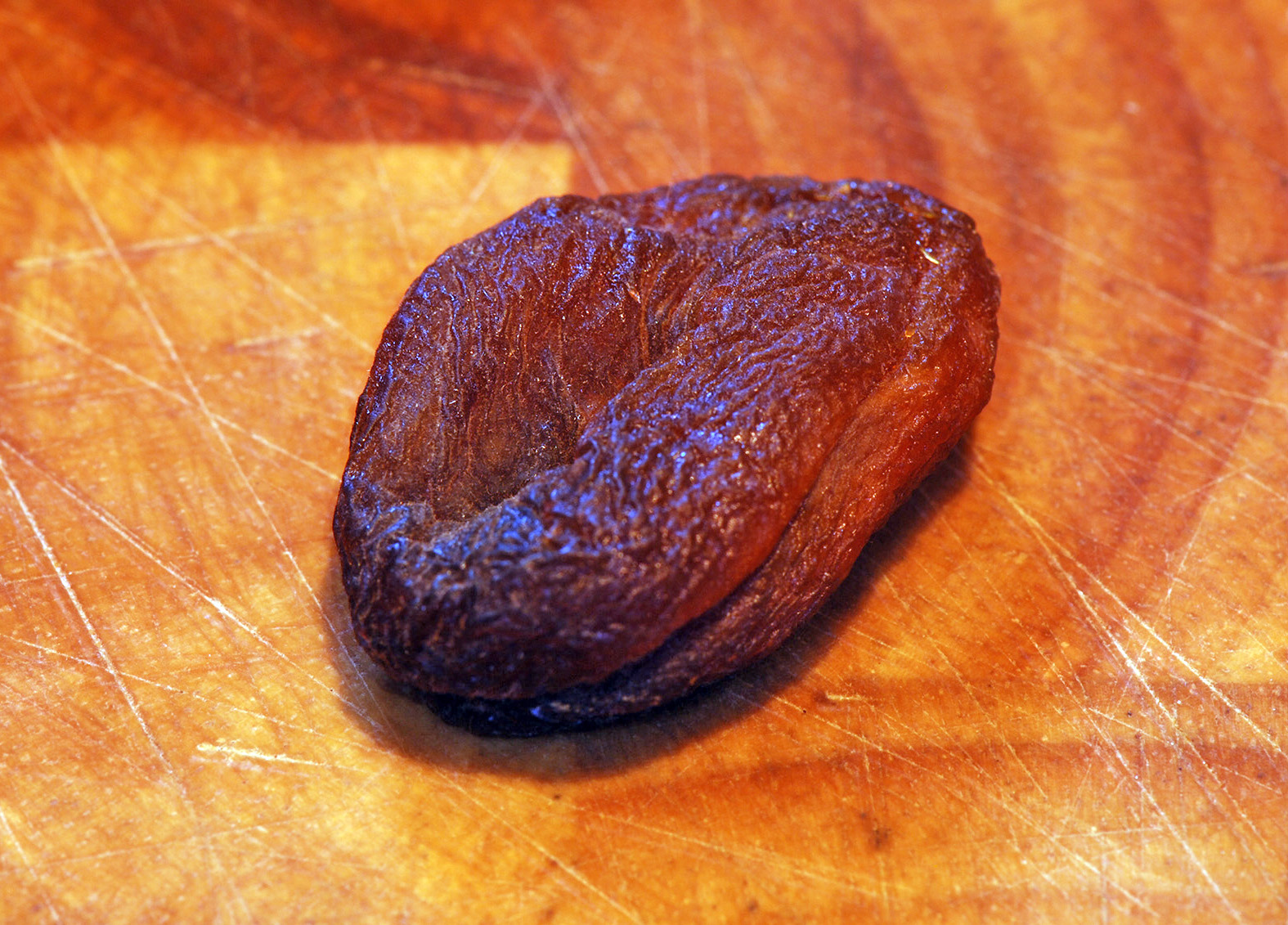
Dried apricot, with dark color due to absence of sulfur dioxide treatment

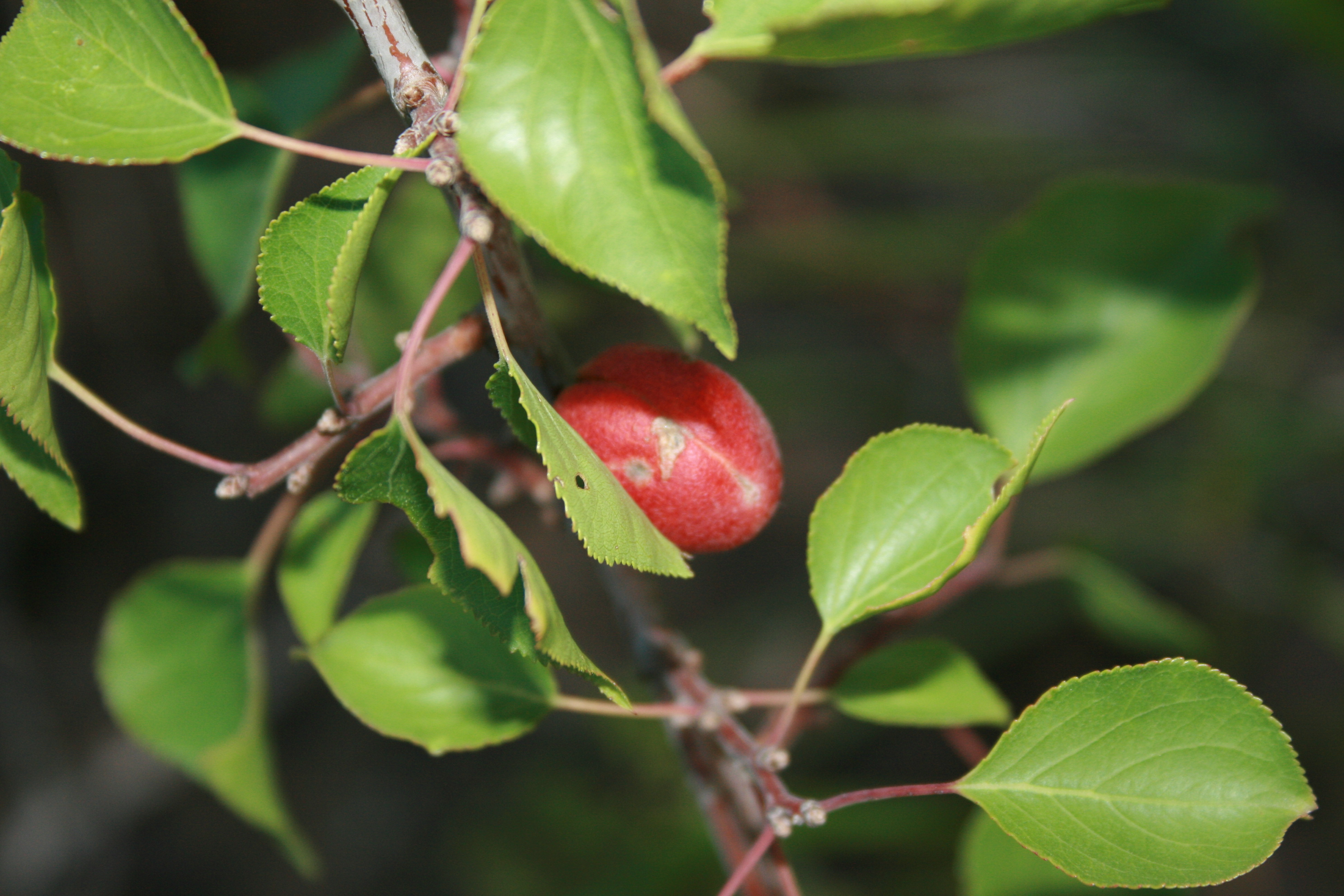
Prunus sibirica (Siberian apricot; hardy to −50 °C (−58 °F) but with less palatable fruit)

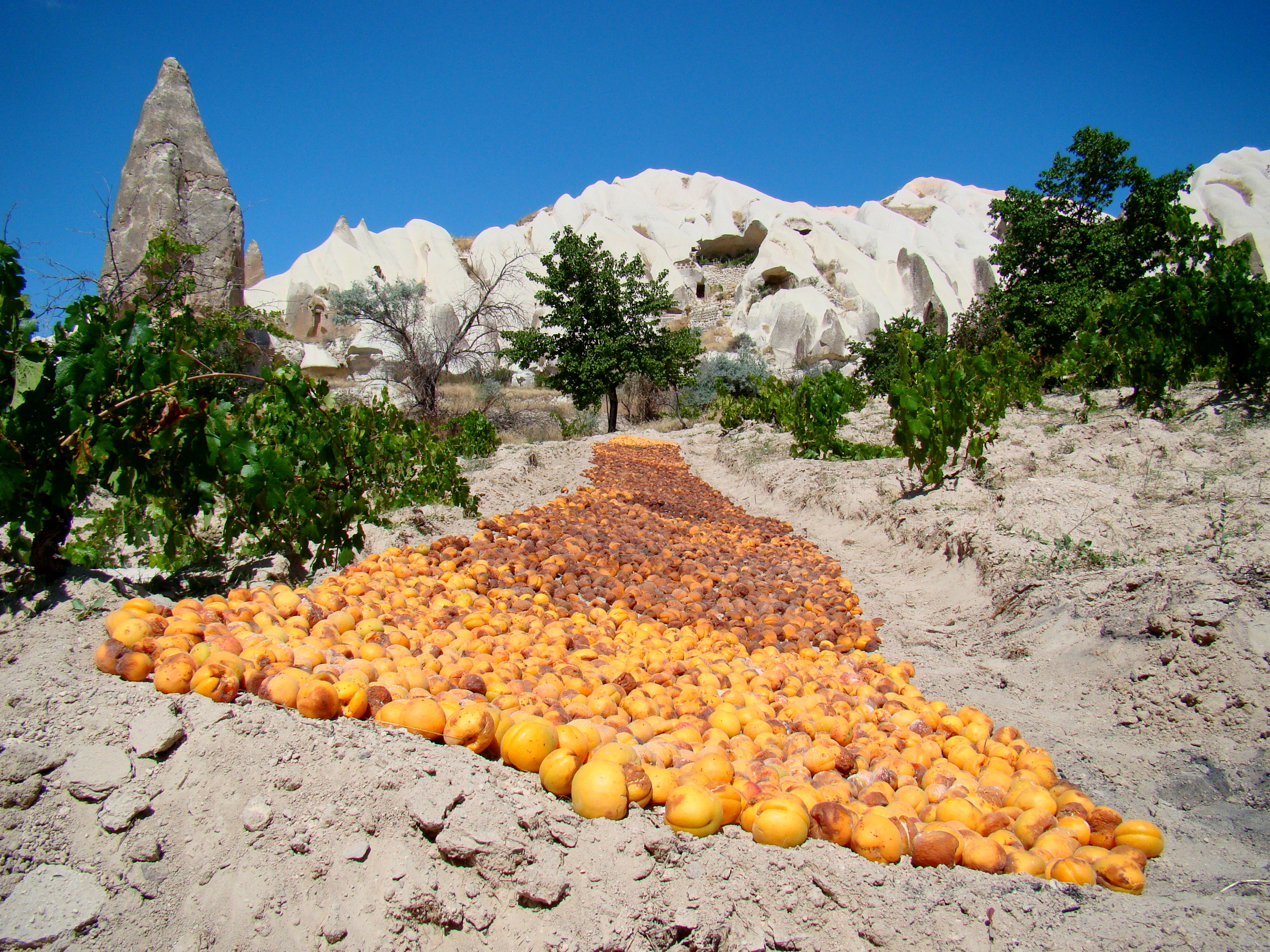
Apricots drying on the ground in Cappadocia

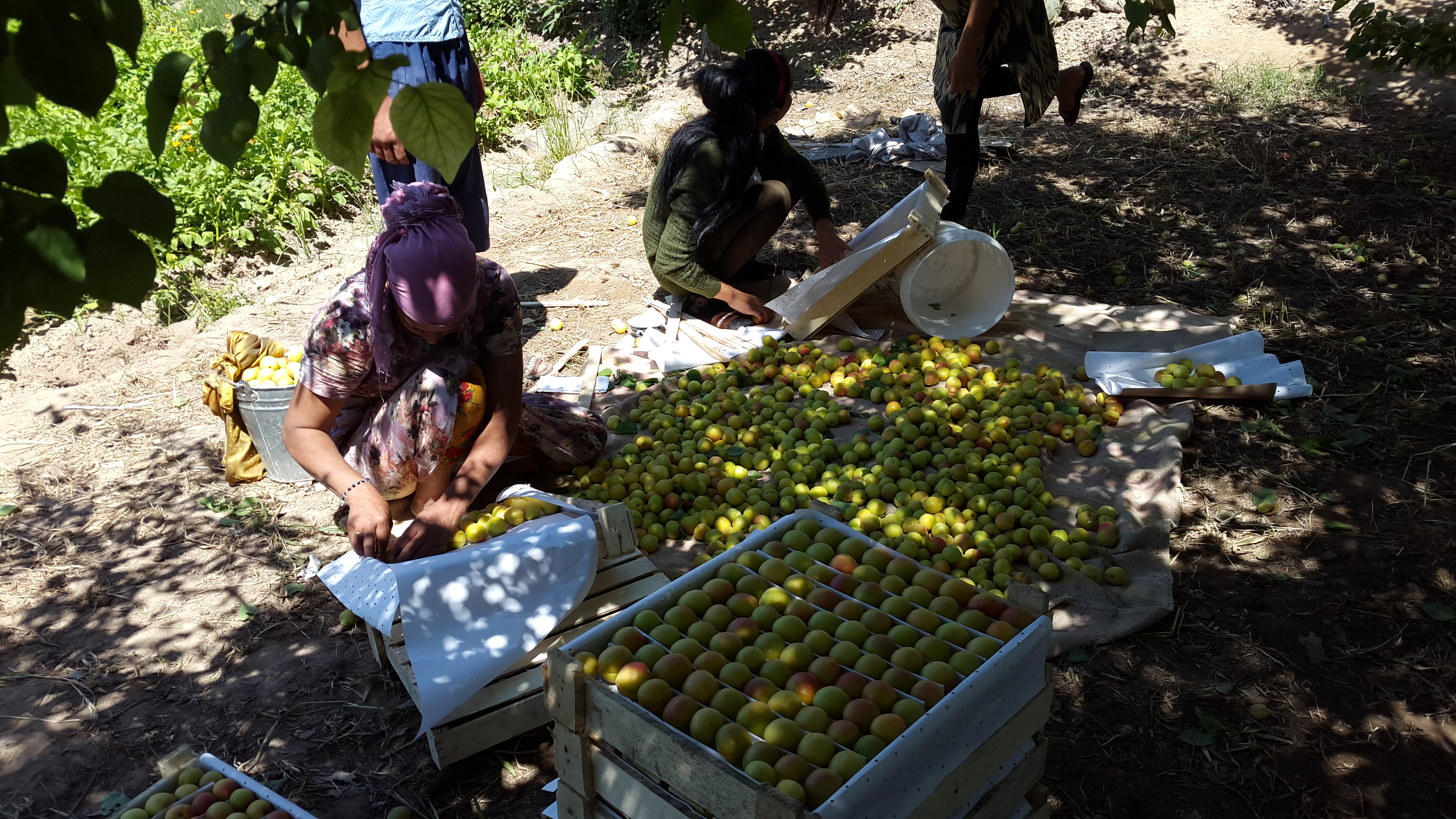
Packaging apricot fruits in Uzbekistan

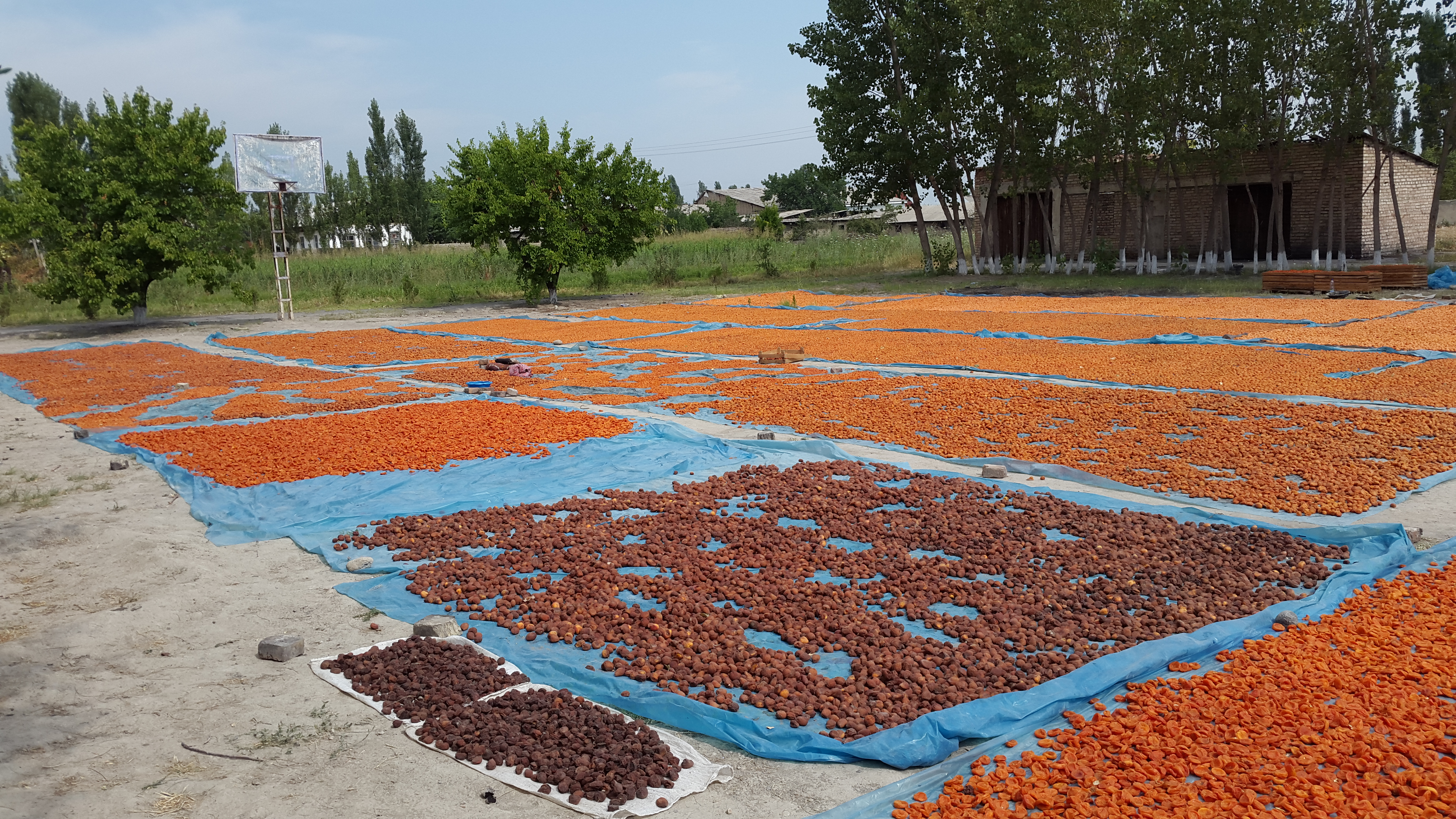
Drying apricots, Uzbekistan

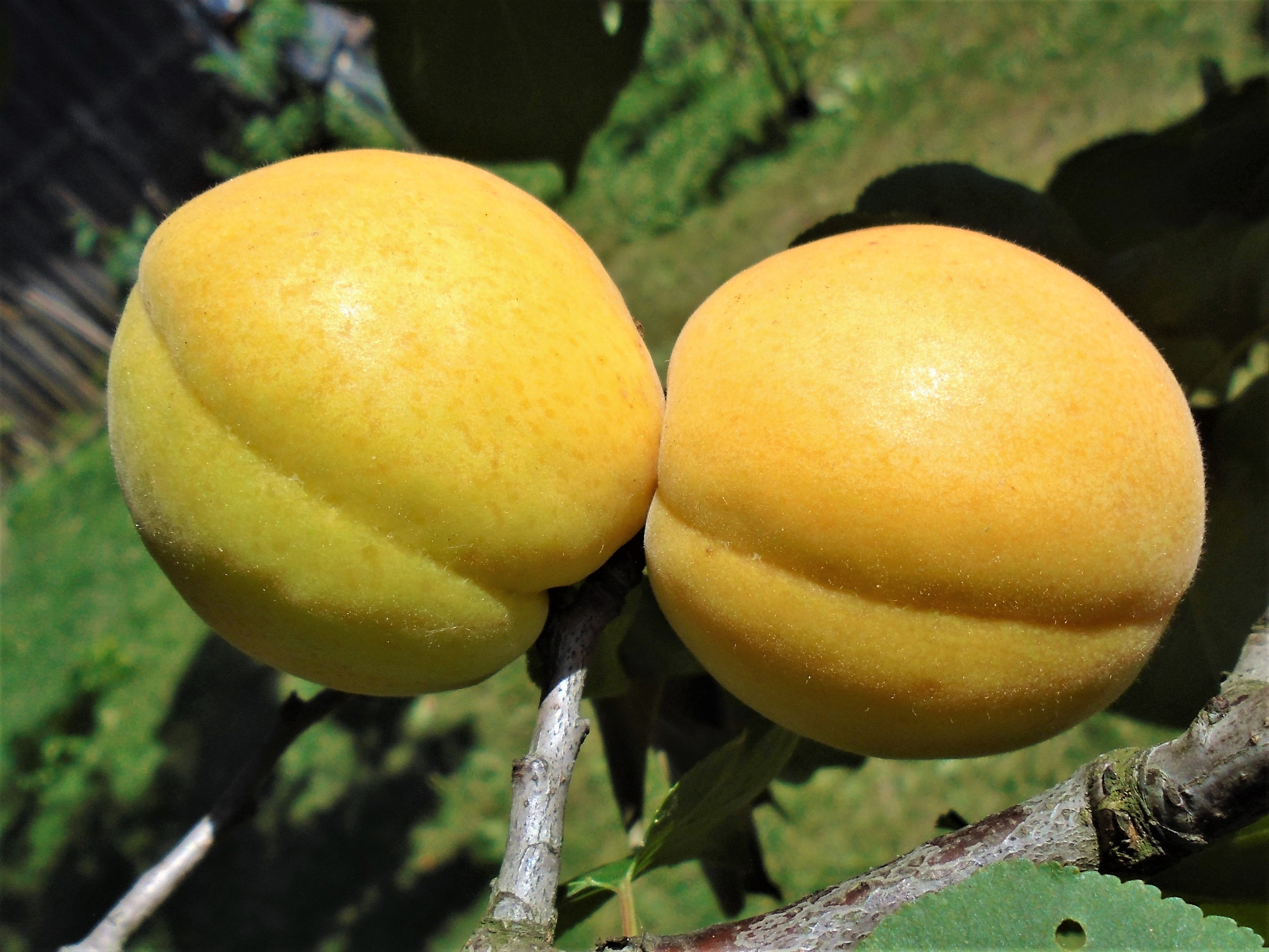
'Kecskemét Rose' - a pale and juicy apricot cultivar

== See also ==
- Apricot plum, Prunus simonii
