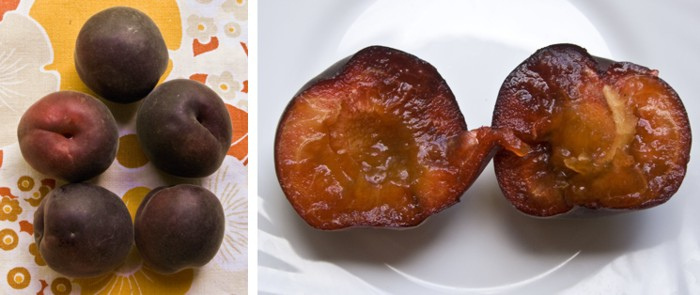

Scientific classification
- Kingdom: Plantae
- Clade: Tracheophytes
- Clade: Angiosperms
- Clade: Eudicots
- Clade: Rosids
- Order: Rosales
- Family: Rosaceae
- Genus: Prunus
- Species: P. × dasycarpa

Binomial name
- Prunus × dasycarpa Ehrh.

Synonyms
- Armeniaca dasycarpa (Ehrh.) Borkh.

= Prunus × dasycarpa =

Species of plant

Prunus × dasycarpa, called purple apricot and black apricot (Chinese: zi xing), is a species of tree. It is in the genus Prunus in the rose family, Rosaceae. The species was named by Jakob Friedrich Ehrhart in 1791. The buds are reddish-orange, and the flower blossoms are white. It is likely a hybrid of P. armeniaca × P. cerasifera (i.e., an apricot–cherry plum cross). There is disagreement about whether this is a human-cultivated cross or a naturally occurring cross from Western Asia.
