= Barack (brandy) =

Hungarian brandy

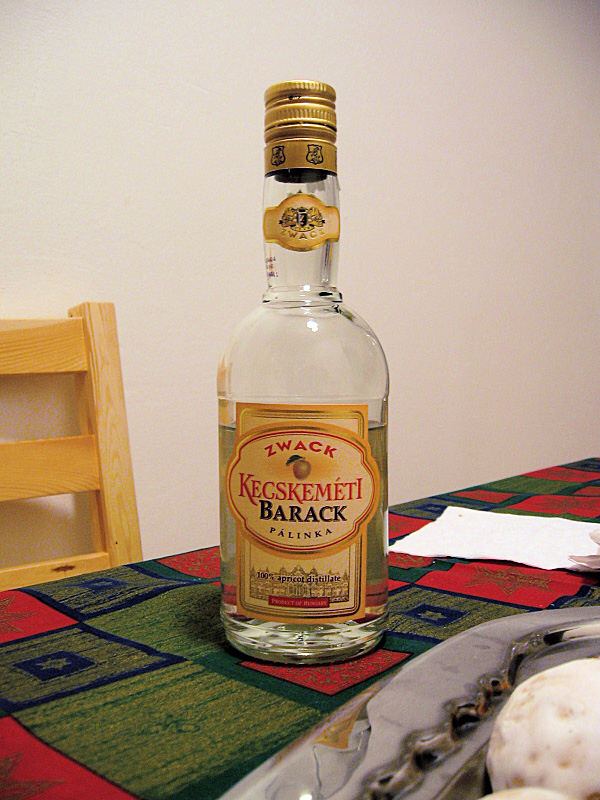
A bottle of Barack brandy

Barack (Hungarian: [ˈbɒrɒt͡sk]) is a type of Hungarian brandy (Pálinka) made of (or flavored with) apricots; an apricot brandy. According to Britannica, barack palinka is "the best known of apricot brandies".

The word barack is a collective term for both apricot (in Hungarian sárgabarack, lit. "yellow-peach") and peach (in Hungarian őszibarack, lit. "autumn-peach"). The Hungarian word barack is etymologically related to the English word 'peach' as well as many words meaning the same in many European languages, and ultimately goes back to persikos, the ancient Greek word for 'Persian'.
