= Etter =

Etter is a surname. Notable people with the surname include:

- Albert Etter (born 1872), American horticulturist
- Bill Etter (born 1950), American football quarterback
- Bob Etter (born 1945), American football placekicker, bridge player, and professor
- Carrie Etter (born 1969), American poet
- Lior Etter (born 1990), Swiss footballer
- Maria Woodworth-Etter (1844–1924), evangelist
- Philipp Etter (1891–1977), Swiss politician
- William H. Etter (born c. 1957), retired United States Air Force lieutenant general

== See also ==
- Etter, California, former name of Ettersburg, California
- Etter, Minnesota, an unincorporated community
- 20804 Etter, main-belt asteroid
