= Felix Gillet =

French-born American pioneer horticulturalist in California (1835–1908)

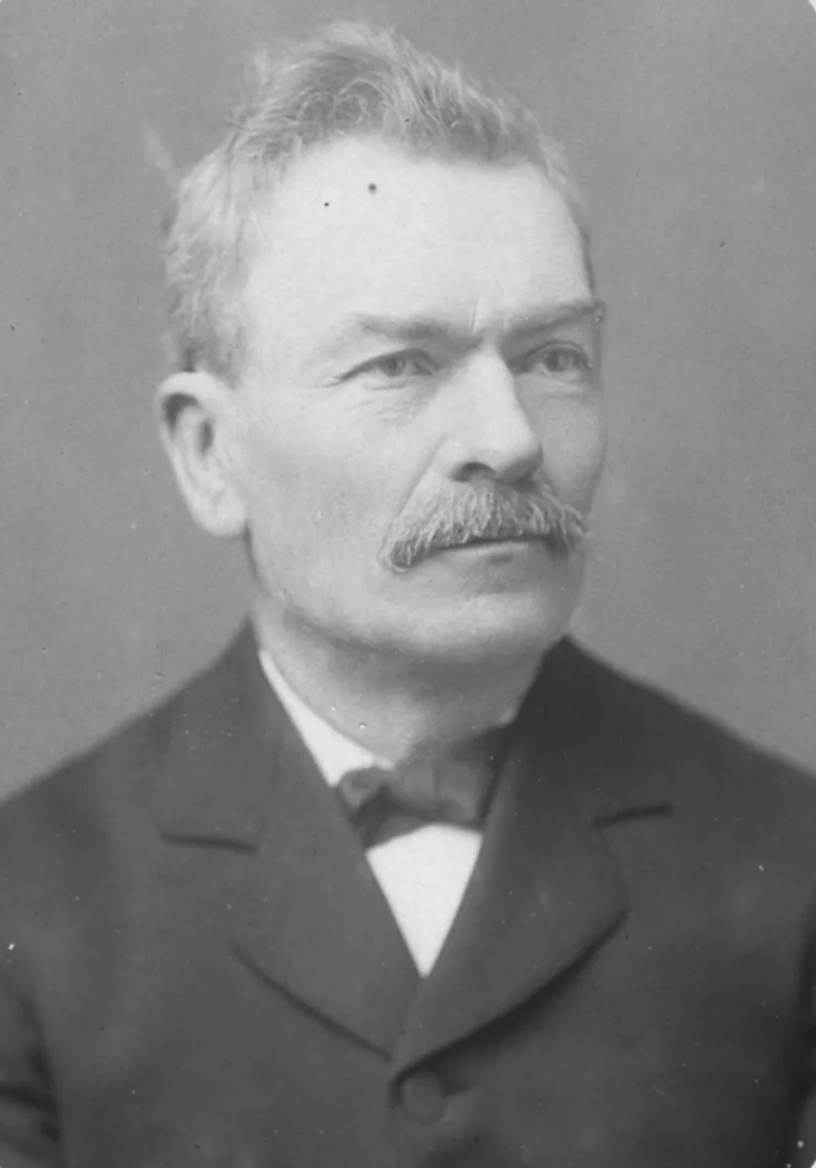
- Portrait of Felix Gillet (c. 1890s)
- Born: March 25, 1835; Rochefort, Charente-Maritime, France
- Died: January 27, 1908 (aged 72); Nevada City, California, United States
- Resting place: Pioneer Cemetery, Nevada City, California, United States
- Occupations: Nurseryman, horticulturist, sericulturist, writer

Felix Gillet (March 25, 1835 – January 27, 1908) was a California pioneer nurseryman, horticulturist, sericulturist, and writer who made several important introductions of superior European deciduous fruit and nut trees to California and the northwestern United States. Beginning in 1869, in his Barren Hill Nursery in Nevada City, Gillet cultivated his own imported scion wood and home-grown nursery stock, experimented with grafting and hybridizing, and continually wrote articles on horticulture and his plant selections, while remaining active in Nevada City civic affairs. Publishing his own nursery catalog for 37 years and advertising widely, he sold his walnuts, filberts (hazelnuts), chestnuts, prunes, figs, strawberries, grapes, peaches, cherries, citrus and dozens of other fruit and nut varieties throughout California and the Pacific Northwest. The commercial walnut variety "Felix Gillet" was named in his honor.

== Early life and career ==
Little is known of Gillet's early life in France before he settled in Nevada City around 1859. Published the day after Gillet died, a Grass Valley Morning Union newspaper article stated he was born in Roucheford [sic] — probably Rochefort — a port town in southwestern France several miles up the river Charente from the Atlantic Ocean. He had three sisters. At age 16, in 1851, he reputedly spent time at a naval school in Rochefort and made several trans-Atlantic crossings working in the shipping industry. By 1852, he was in Boston, where he learned the barber trade. He possibly was a houseguest of prominent Bostonians Samuel Gridley Howe and Julia Ward Howe, who hosted visits by some European immigrants seeking a new life in America. In 1858, Gillet was a barber in San Jose, California, where French orchardists were establishing large fruit and nut farms. In February 1859, at age 24, he moved to the prosperous gold mining town of Nevada (City) in the Sierra Nevada foothills.

Gillet opened a barbershop on Commercial Street, just below Pine Street, in downtown Nevada City. He also sold French finery such as pens, stationery, toys and novelties. He would operate the shop until 1882. Soon after arriving in Nevada City, Gillet became acquainted with an important influence, Frenchman Jean-Baptiste Ducray, who with his younger brother Jean Claude had mined gold and farmed in Nevada City since 1850. As young men, the Ducray brothers had quickly made money in mining interests, and then established large, mostly self-sufficient French-style farms at the edge of Nevada City. Gillet admired Jean-Baptiste Ducray's idyllic 35-acre farm of fruit and nut trees, grape vines, beehives and roses, which had been reclaimed from land mine-stripped to bedrock. To investigate the nursery trade and French horticulture, Gillet returned to France for 10 months in 1864, then returned to Nevada City. In February 1865, he reopened his shop. He became a naturalized United States citizen in 1866. From 1866 until 1880, Gillet also filed eight gold mining claims. There is no record of what he did with them.

In either the fall of 1869 or August 1870, Gillet purchased with $250 in gold coin 16 acres of land just outside town and started establishing a farm and plant nursery. Like that of his friends the Ducrays, Gillet's land was mostly granite bedrock recently surface-mined, timbered and left barren. While friends cast doubt on his success as a nurseryman, Gillet built a house and established his Barren Hill Nursery while continuing to run the barbershop. Gillet then spent $3,000 ($49,180 in 2011, adjusting for inflation) on a large order of walnut, filbert, chestnut, mulberry, prune, and fig trees from France. He risked his personal wealth that his imported scion wood and nursery stock would arrive alive, and would not fail to grow in Nevada County. It's not known how the live plants were shipped, but the recent completion of the transcontinental railroad would have significantly shortened the transportation time, if Gillet had his plants shipped from Europe to the East Coast, then freighted by rail to California.

In the spring of 1871, after he spent a year and a half growing and propagating his imported fruit and nut trees, and carefully observing the climate and topographic conditions that produced the best results in his nursery and elsewhere, Gillet began selling nursery stock. His catalog included his first important introductions to California agriculture — soft-shelled Franquette, Mayette and other walnuts from France. These cultivars were unknown in California and Gillet's stock became widely planted and thrived. Open-pollinated seedlings of these early introductions would later produce superior cultivars still grown today. Gillet also imported, propagated and hybridized many other fruit and nut trees, grapes, berries and ornamentals. Paying (or possibly trading) for advertising space to promote his plant stock, he became a regular horticultural writer in regional newspapers and became knowledgeable about still-pioneering horticultural efforts throughout California and the Pacific Northwest. From at least the late 1860s, he also persistently championed domestic sericulture and promoted planting mulberry trees as hosts for silkworms, despite little evidence it was economically viable in the United States. In 1870, Gillet promoted the silky floss of common milkweed as a textile fiber.

Gillet's advertisements and writings in horticultural journals, such as the popular weekly Pacific Rural Press (published in San Francisco), established his reputation for offering superior French varieties of fruit and nut trees. Besides importing stock, Gillet made selections of superior offspring he grew in his nursery. He experimented with grafting varieties of fruits to hardy wild specimens, and specialized in introducing varieties that thrived in poor soil conditions, which ensured that his introductions would succeed in many different western locations. In the mid-1870s, Gillet's work with strawberries resulted in his introduction of new varieties and his publication in 1876 of an authoritative 32-page booklet on "fragriculture," the growing of strawberries. A January 1877 edition of the California Farmer and Journal of Useful Sciences stated Gillet sold 48 varieties of strawberries.

Gillet's next notable plant introduction to California (in 1883) was a free stone dessert prune from the Clairac region of France, which he called "Clairac Mammoth" (a.k.a. "Imperial Epineuse"). At a time when most California fruit was consumed fresh, dried and canned dessert prunes were a popular, expensive import from France. California prune growers as early as 1854 had attempted to cut into this lucrative market by importing and growing French prune trees, but struggled to copy French drying methods. Gillet competed with John Rock, another well-known nurseryman in Niles (Fremont), to market hardier prune trees that produced very large fruit. Gillet introduced his Clairac prune trees two years before Rock. Both men crossed or grafted the French prunes with wild California plums to produce a variety that was more drought-tolerant and hardier in upland orchards, than in lowlands such as the Santa Clara Valley, then the prune growing center of California.

Gillet's last and most enduring plant introduction was in 1885, when he sold a large quantity of filbert (hazelnut) stock to orchardists in Oregon's Willamette Valley. Although filberts had been grown in Oregon since the 1850s, Gillet's imported "Barcelona" and "DuChilly" varieties proved to be superior. The "Barcelona" variety remains the most widely planted in Oregon, which today produces 98 percent of the filbert crop in the United States. Ironically, filberts do not grow well in the Sierra foothills, where Gillet propagated them.

== Reputation and rivals ==
In 1881, Gillet became a member of the Nurserymen's Committee of the first California Fruit Growers' Convention. Gillet and fellow pioneer nurseryman W.B. West of Stockton were members of the first California Horticultural Commission, a forerunner of the California Department of Food and Agriculture. After just a decade of importing, cultivating, experimenting, selling and prolifically writing about fruits, nuts and berries, Gillet was a respected figure in California horticulture and regarded as an unsurpassed expert in French varieties of fruits and nuts. Gillet's reputation also was created, in part, by tireless self-promotion. In a Feb. 9. 1884 advertisement in the Pacific Rural Press, Gillet touted his nursery as "the finest nut-bearing tree nursery in the U.S." His catalog at that time offered 17 varieties of walnut, including eight grafted from European varieties; seven varieties of chestnuts, six varieties of filberts, seven varieties of prunes, 55 varieties of English gooseberries, and 107 varieties of grapes. These numbers would increase; at one point, the nursery offered 241 types of grapes, including several varieties previously unknown in California.

Gillet's regional renown, however, would be eclipsed by Luther Burbank, whose 1893 descriptive catalog "New Creations in Fruits and Flowers" stunned the horticultural world with the introduction of many previously unknown fruit, vegetable and flower hybrids. The catalog made Burbank internationally famous. It is not known if Burbank and Gillet corresponded, or met, but they undoubtedly were aware of each other and were commercial competitors. The 1897-98 biennial report of the California State Board of Horticulture comparatively evaluated Gillet's "Clairac Mammoth"/"Imperial Epineuse" prune with Burbank's "Sugar." In a paper presented at the 1904 Northwest Fruit Growers' Association, Gillet acknowledged Burbank's "Sugar" prune variety, but noted that his imported French trees produced a superior dessert prune and sent the delegation samples for taste comparison.

Another Gillet rival was John Rock (born Johann Fels), whose large, Fremont-based California Nursery Company (established in 1865) introduced French prune scion wood in 1886 and claimed to sell the best varieties for dessert prunes. Gillet had made the same claim since 1883. For several years, Gillet's advertisements denounced unnamed rivals, whom he said fraudulently claimed his nursery stock as their own. Of the German-born nurseryman, Luther Burbank said, "John Rock is the most learned man in his profession to be found in California."

== Civic and later life ==
Besides tending his nursery and gardens, Gillet experimented with wine making, did book binding and wrote essays and columns about horticulture, astronomy, navigation, and California Indians. He closed his barbershop in 1882 to devote his full energy to his nursery. Possibly due to his admiration of abolitionists Samuel and Julia Ward Howe, Gillet was among the few whites who, in the Reconstruction Era, publicly supported equal rights for Nevada County's few African-Americans — some of whom were former slaves. Gillet's racial tolerance, however, did not extend to the Chinese, whose businesses in Nevada City were adjacent to his own. Gillet was one local leader of the Workingmen's Party of California, a nativist labor organization whose agitation against Chinese immigrant workers on the Central Pacific Railroad led to the federal Chinese Exclusion Act of 1882. In April 1881, Nevada City passed an ordinance that "all Chinese shall be removed from the Nevada City within 60 days." From 1878 to 1881, Gillet was twice elected to the Nevada City Town Trustees. He helped make the city government more effective and progressive and reportedly never missed a session. He was a trustee during construction of a new city hall.

In 1890, Gillet's close friends, Jean-Baptiste and Julia Catherine Ducray both died, leaving their large orchard estate to their niece and adopted daughter Theresa Julia Brenoel (b. 1868 in Crawford County, Pennsylvania; d. Feb. 8, 1913). Gillet, 56, and Brenoel, 23, were married in 1891. The couple had no children. In 1895, Gillet was an influential voice in the creation of Nevada City's municipal water plant. In 1904-05 he was a contributing member of the American Pomological Society. After months of poor health, Gillet died from several ailments in 1908 at age 72. He was buried in the Pioneer Cemetery in Nevada City.

== Legacy ==
His wife continued to operate the nursery after Felix Gillet's death. She hired George Dulac as head nurseryman. They were married in 1909. In 1913, following the former Mrs. Gillet's death, the nursery was sold to Charles E. Parsons, who renamed it Felix Gillet Nursery. For another 55 years, Parsons continued to sell Gillet's nursery stock, publish a nursery catalog, and write about Gillet's pioneering horticultural work. Parsons also made new introductions of fruit and nut varieties from stock originally cultivated by Gillet. One important introduction by Parsons was the "Colossal" variety of chestnut, which had originated in another variety cultivated by Gillet.

In 1933, a plaque honoring Gillet was placed by Nevada City residents on a stone pillar at the entrance to the former nursery.

In 1968, the business was thought to be the oldest continuously operating nursery in California and the second-oldest west of the Rocky Mountains. Following Parsons' death in 1969, the nursery era ended and the property became a private residence. The former nursery property was later subdivided for construction of several houses. Gillet's farmhouse and some of his fruit and nut trees remain in the Aristocracy Hill neighborhood. The site still attracts admiring horticulturalists from universities in California, Oregon and Washington.

In 1994, the University of California Walnut Breeding Program introduced, and later patented, three new walnut varieties, the most vigorous-growing of which was named "Felix Gillet."

In 2003, the Felix Gillet Institute was founded to locate, propagate, maintain and sell the trees that Gillet and others had brought to California.

On January 27, 2008, Nevada City marked the centennial of Gillet's death by proclaiming Felix Gillet Day.

== Publications ==
- Gillet, Felix (1876). Fragriculture; or the Culture of the Strawberry/A Practical Treatise on the Culture, Propagation, Management and Marketing of Strawberries. Spaulding & Barto Printers, San Francisco, 1876. The illustrated book is in the Library on Congress, the Biodiversity Heritage Library and other libraries.

== Additional resources ==
- A collection of nursery and seed catalogs published by the Felix Gillet Nursery from 1884-1962 is part of the Ethel Z. Bailey Horticultural Catalogue Collection, College of Agriculture and Life Sciences at Cornell University.
- United States Department of Agriculture/National Clonal Germplasm Repository, (Corvallis, Oregon).
