= Surprise (apple) =

Apple cultivar

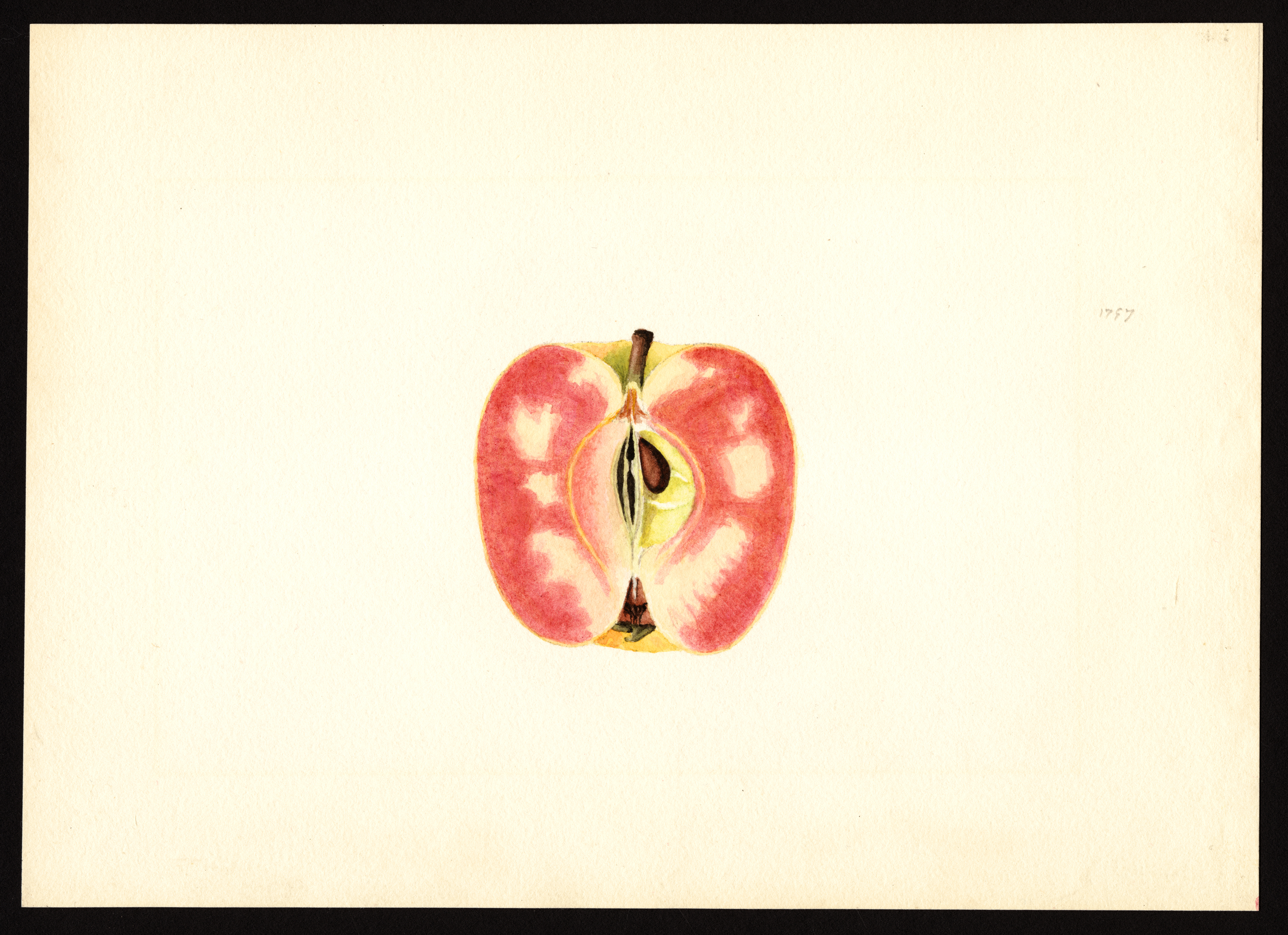
- Watercolor of Surprise apple in cross-section, showing typical red-tinged flesh. By J. Marion Shull, 1938.
- Genus: Malus
- Species: niedzwetskyana
- Cultivar: 'Surprise'

'Surprise' is a pink-fleshed apple that is the ancestor of many of the present-day pink/red-fleshed apples bred by American growers.

== History ==
'Surprise' is a smallish, round apple with a dull pale green or whitish-yellow skin and very tart red-tinged flesh. It is believed to be a descendant of Malus niedzwetskyana, a deeply red-fleshed apple native to Siberia and the Caucasus. Whereas other descendants of M. niedzwetskyana tend to have darkish-red flesh (such as a series of apples and crabapples developed by plant breeder Niels Ebbesen Hansen), Surprise and the cultivars based on it tend to have a brighter pinkish or light reddish flesh. The red pigmentation of the flesh comes mainly from a class of flavonoids called anthocyanins, in particular, idaein.

Surprise began to circulate in Europe sometime before 1831, when it was reported growing in the London Horticultural Society Gardens. It was first brought to the United States by German immigrants to the Ohio Valley around 1840 and quickly intrigued plant breeders because of its unusually colored flesh. The horticulturist and landscape designer Andrew Jackson Downing and his brother Charles, a noted pomologist in his own right, had a tree of Surprise in their collection in Newburgh, New York. The Downings were not, in the end, very impressed with Surprise. In the 1890 edition of their book The Fruit and Fruit Trees of America, the Downings wrote it off as a "small, round, whitish yellow apple of little or no value, but admired by some for its singularity, the flesh being stained with red."

As a teenager in the 1870s, the horticulturist Liberty Hyde Bailey grafted Surprise onto a tree in his father's orchard in South Haven, Michigan, using scion wood that had come from Charles Downing. Years later, in his 1928 book The Garden Lover, he wrote:

I set those scions, and for many a year made pilgrimage to the tree and opened the green fruits to be surprised again and again at the pink flesh 'stained with red' as the original The Fruit and Fruit Trees of America has it.

As late as 1957, a single tree was said to be still standing on the site of the Bailey family orchard (which had since been replaced with a hospital).

== In apple breeding ==
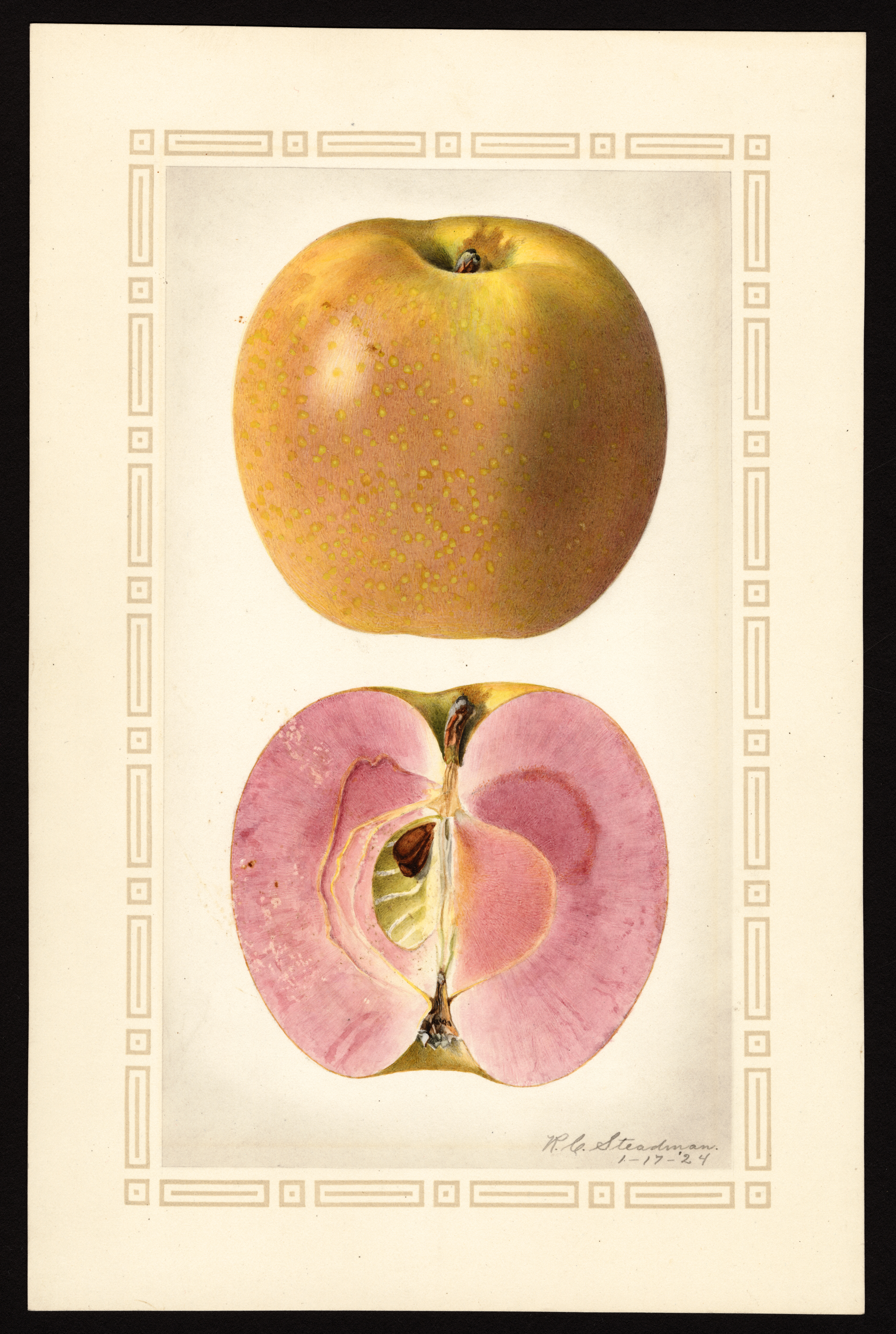
Apple from seedling of the Surprise cultivar, watercolor by Royal Charles Steadman, 1924

Although 'Surprise' turned out to be not well suited to Midwestern and Eastern growing conditions, it did much better when moved to the West Coast, with its long growing season featuring hot days and cool nights. The northern California horticulturist Albert Etter had success with it as the cornerstone of a program to breed pink- and red-fleshed apple cultivars. By 1928, he was far enough along that he published a report in the Pacific Rural Press in which he described two open-pollinated descendants of 'Surprise' that had pink or red flesh. One of these, 'Redflesh Winter Banana' (so named for both its internal and its external appearance) is said to have been his personal favorite among a total of some 30 pink- and red-fleshed varieties that emerged from his breeding program. The second was a nameless variety that, from its description, might have been 'Pink Pearl', which became by far the best-known of this group and is still grown today. Although not all of Etter's 'Surprise' descendants were successful, the best of them shared a pronounced aromatic quality that appears to be linked to the anthocyanin pigmentation that gives the flesh its distinctive pinkish and reddish tones. Their mixed ancestry meant that their size, skin color, eating qualities, and ripening time varied greatly, as did their flesh color, which ranged from pale pink through rose to purplish red, occasionally mottled or marbled with white.

In 1940, Etter set up a partnership with George Roeding Jr.'s California Nursery Company, one of the goals of which was to introduce some of Etter's 'Surprise'-derived cultivars to the public. Eventually Roeding settled on test seedling #39, which apparently impressed him with its looks (translucent skin, medium size, and tapered shape), its tart-sweet flavor, and its late-summer ripening date. He secured U.S. plant patent 723 for it on Etter's behalf, christened it 'Pink Pearl', and featured it in his 1945 catalog.

In 1973, apple fancier Ram Fishman settled near Etter's old experimental orchard and became intrigued by the pink-fleshed apples that could still be found among the old trees on that site. Over the course of a decade, Fishman managed to locate examples of what he believes are about half of Etter's pink-fleshed 'Surprise' descendants. They were given new names since the old names could not be firmly determined and are marketed under the 'Rosetta' series title (alongside other 'Surprise'-based cultivars) through his Greenmantle Nursery. These Etter–Fishman cultivars include 'Pink Pearmain' (probably the same as an apple known elsewhere as 'Pink Sparkle'), 'Blush Rosette', 'Thornberry', 'Rubaiyat', 'Christmas Pink', 'Grenadine', and 'Pink Parfait'.

Other likely descendants of 'Surprise' have been found elsewhere, such as varieties known as 'Aerlie's Red Flesh' (also known as 'Airlie Red Flesh' and 'Hidden Rose') and 'Bill's Red Flesh' (also known as 'Scarlet Surprise'), both found in abandoned orchards in the Willamette Valley, Oregon.

'Surprise' continues to be used in apple-breeding programs, and there is particular interest in the potential health benefits of this lineage. The anthocyanins that give red coloration to the skin of red apples and to the flesh of 'Surprise' and its descendants possess antioxidant qualities. One group of scientists has been working since 1989 on breeding red-fleshed apples from 'Surprise' for the Japanese market because most Japanese consumers peel their apples and thus lose the anthocyanins in the skin.

== See also ==
- Applecrab
