= American Pomological Society =

Fruit organization in North America

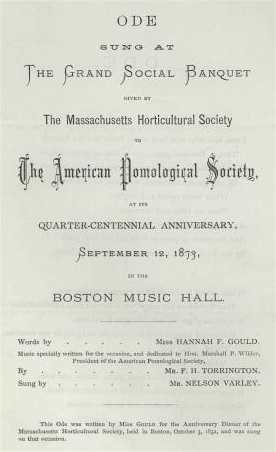
Ode, sung at the grand social banquet given by the Massachusetts Horticultural Society to the American Pomological Society, at its quarter-centennial anniversary, September 12, 1873, in the Boston Music Hall. Words by Miss Hannah Flagg Gould.

Address at the American Pomological Society, 1885

The American Pomological Society was founded by Marshall Pinckney Wilder in 1848, to foster the growing of fruit and the development of new varieties, and is the oldest fruit organization in North America.

== Publications ==
The organization's primary publication is the Journal of the American Pomological Society. This journal was previously known as the Fruit Varieties Journal. The society also publishes the Register of Fruit and Nut Varieties in cooperation with the American Society for Horticultural Science.

== Notable people ==
- Helen Vickroy Austin
- Catherine Hayes Bailey
- Patrick Barry
- Joseph Lancaster Budd
- Charles Benedict Calvert
- George M. Darrow
- Albert Etter
- Felix Gillet
- Lue Gim Gong
- Ulysses Prentiss Hedrick
- Arthur B. Howard
- John Carmichael Jenkins
- Thomas Meehan
- Frederick Smyth
- Marshall Pinckney Wilder (politician)
- Floyd Zaiger
