= C21H21ClO11 =

The molecular formula C_{21}H_{21}ClO_{11} (molar mass: 484.84 g/mol, exact mass: 484.0772 u) may refer to:

- Chrysanthemin chloride (Cyanidin 3-O-glucoside chloride)
- Idaein chloride (Cyanidin 3-O-galactoside chloride)
