= Crimson Gold (apple) =

Apple cultivar

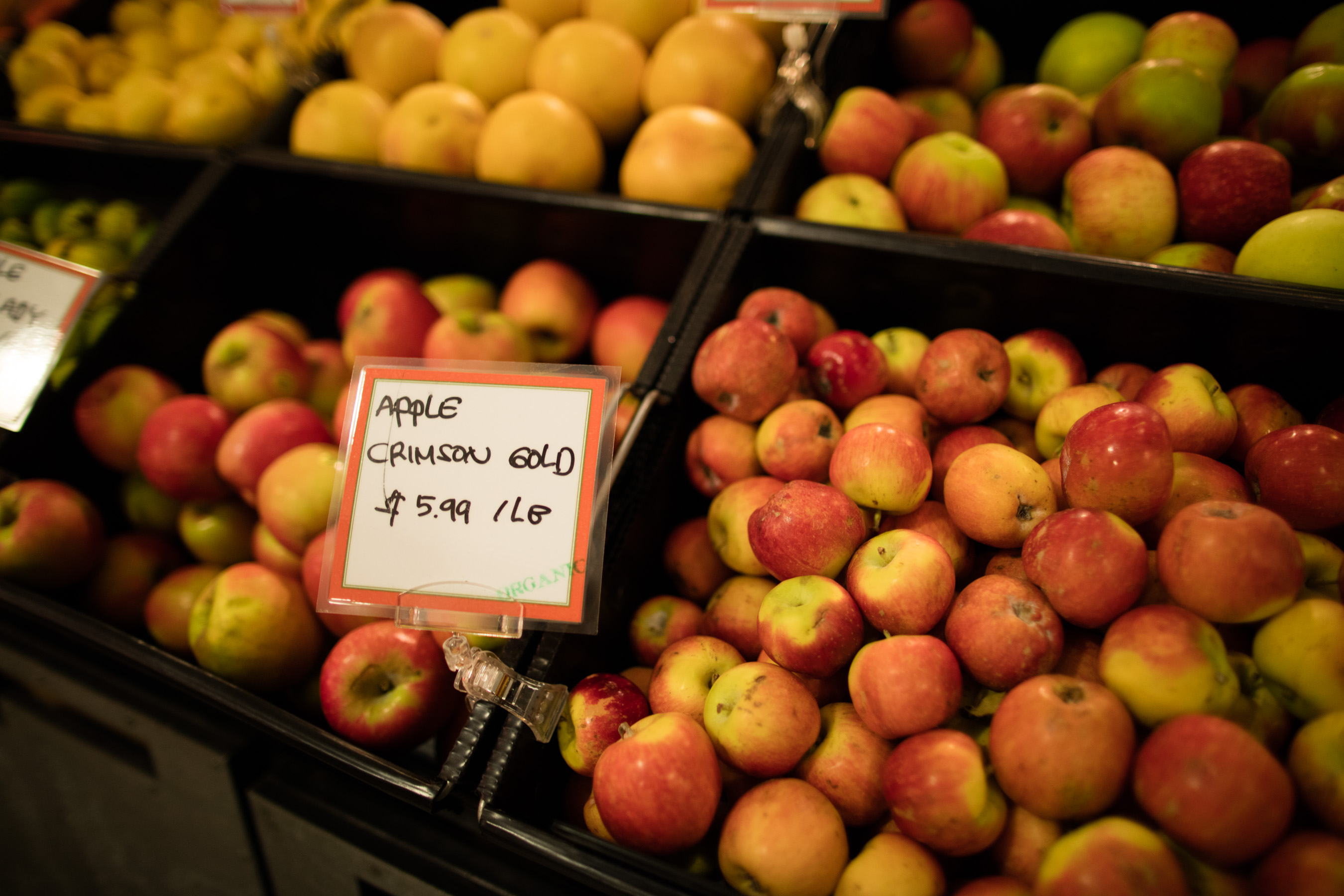
- Species: Malus Domestica
- Cultivar: Crimson Gold
- Breeder: Albert Etter
- Origin: (United States) Niles, now Fremont, California, 1944

'Crimson Gold' is a modern cultivar of applecrab, meaning that it is a cross between a crabapple and a domesticated apple. It is a small apple.

It is one of the last apples to be developed by the American breeder Albert Etter in 1944, called it 'Little Rosybloom', but changed the name to 'Crimson Gold' for the patent application. Etter died in 1950 before completing the patent filing, and the variety was lost until rediscovered by Ram Fishman.

The skin of 'Crimson Gold' has a yellow background which is visual only at the shaded areas of the skin and around the stem. Otherwise it is covered with a ruby red. Flesh is crisp, with a balance of sweet and tart. Delicious for fresh eating, and also good for baking, retains its shape and texture even with high temperature. In fact, when the apple was rediscovered, about 1970, on a single limb of an old test orchard, Etter's "boil test" was used to confirm that the found apple was in fact Crimson Gold/Little Rosybloom. The genuine apple holds its shape after 2 hours of boiling, while the similar Wickson Crab, also an Etter introduction, does not. The variety grown and distributed by the U.S. Germplasm Repository at Geneva NY under the name "Crimson Gold" also appears to be Wickson.

Crimson Gold blooms midseason to late, and is considered a good pollinator for other apple varieties. It is one of several varieties used to pollinate Honeycrisp, Gala, and Fuji, for instance in Washington State commercial orchards.

Marketers and producers wanting to capitalize on the Crimson Gold name have caused confusion by using the name for two other apple varieties. Brandt's Fruit Trees owns the trademark Crimson®, issued for living trees of the Waliser Gala apple variety. When a new and different apple variety from Europe called "Svatava" was introduced to the United States, they marketed Svatava as "Crimson® Gold". The name Crimson Gold itself is not trademarked. Additionally, the variety Wickson Crab has been marketed in California as Crimson Gold, both as nursery stock and more recently as fresh fruit.
