= Hannah Flagg Gould =

American poet

- Born: September 3, 1789; Lancaster, Massachusetts
- Died: September 5, 1865; Newburyport, Massachusetts
- Occupation: Poet
- Notable work: "A Name in the Sand"

Hannah Flagg Gould (September 3, 1789 – September 5, 1865) was a 19th-century American poet. Her father had been a soldier in the American Revolutionary War, and after her mother's death, she became his constant companion, which accounts for the patriotism of her earlier verses. Gould's poems were short, but it was frequently "impossible to find fault" with them, according to one reviewer. Nearly all of them appeared originally in annuals, magazines, and other miscellanies, and their popularity was shown by the subsequent sale of several collective editions. Her work exercised a helpful influence in its day, but lacked staying qualities. The high-water mark of her verse was reached in the poem entitled "A Name in the Sand".

== Early years ==
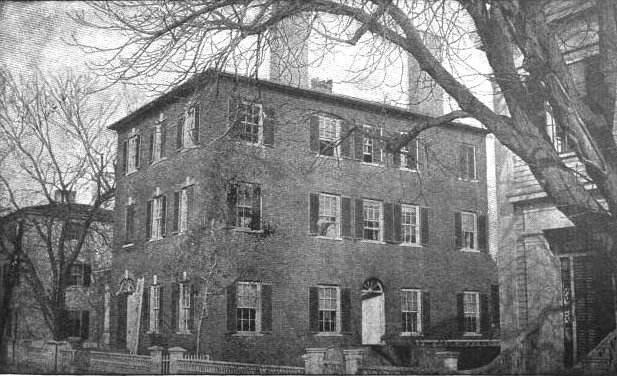
Hannah Flagg Gould home in Newburyport, Massachusetts

Hannah Flagg Gould was born in Lancaster, Massachusetts, September 3, 1789. Her parents were Benjamin Gould (1751-1841) and Grizzell Apthorp "Griselda" (Flagg) Gould. She was named after her grandmother Hannah (Pitbull) Flagg. Hannah had ten siblings. In addition to her, three other siblings received Flagg for a middle name, John, Grizzel, and Gershom. The other seven were Esther, Benjamin, Apthorp, Rebecca, Sarah, Mary, and Elizabeth.

While a child, her father moved to Newburyport, Massachusetts. The father was one of the small company who fought in the first battle of the American Revolutionary War, and in the face of all the privations and discouragements of that long and often hopeless war remained, in the army until it was disbanded. In "The Scar of Lexington", "The Revolutionary Soldier's Request", "The Veteran and the Child", and several other pieces, she may have referred to him. Gould's history was in a peculiar degree and in an honorable manner identified with her father's. In her youth, he re-moved to Newburyport, near Boston, and for many years before his death, she was his housekeeper, his constant companion, and the chief source of his happiness.

== Career ==
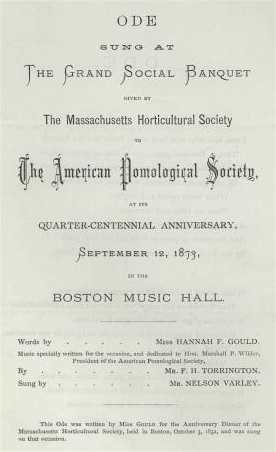
Ode, sung at the grand social banquet given by the Massachusetts Horticultural Society to the American Pomological Society, at its quarter-centennial anniversary, September 12, 1873, in the Boston Music Hall. Words by Hannah Flagg Gould.

Early in her career, she wrote for several periodicals, and in 1832, her poetical pieces were collected in a volume. In 1835 and in 1841, second and third volumes appeared, each titled simply Poems. In 1846, she collected a volume of her prose compositions, titled Gathered Leaves. A new edition, embracing many new poems, was in preparation in 1848.

She was widely known in her day as the author of numberless poems and prose sketches, and hundreds of school children were reciting her lines. She was one of two women of her time who published poems on geology, hers being "The Mastodon" (1847), while Felicia Dorothea Heman's work, "Epitaph for a Mineralogist" was published in 1836. The poem "Jack Frost" put his merry pranks to the front and prepared the way for science to give him a true analysis. "A Name in the Sand" was a poem to correct our ready overestimate of our own importance. "The Snow Flake" was considered of rare merit.

According to the American Unitarian Association (1912):— "Her independence of thought sometimes led to her being classified as 'strong-minded', a term that in those days was not infrequently applied to women of originality; but, as she was a literary woman, Newburyport easily forgave the fact of her ability to think for herself. Eccentric she undeniably was, but she was kind-hearted as well, and her talents were appreciated." Gould led a quiet life in the homestead where she resided for half a century — a life that would have been as secluded as it was unostentatious but for her genial hospitality and the many visitors and distinguished authors who sought her acquaintance. Her nephew was the noted astronomer Benjamin Apthorp Gould. She died at Newburyport, September 5, 1865.

== Style and themes ==
Of her poetry, a writer in the Christian Examiner remarked that it was "impossible to find fault. It is so sweet and unpretending, so pure in purpose and so gentle in expression that criticism is disarmed of all severity and engaged to say nothing of it but good. It is poetry for a sober, quiet, kindly-affectioned Christian heart. It is poetry for a united family circle in their hours of peace and leisure. For such companionship it was made, and into such it will find, and has found, its way". One of her more popular verses, A Name in the Sand, was often mis-attributed to better-known authors, such as Charles Dickens and George D. Prentice.

According to Griswold (1852), her most distinguishing characteristic was sprightliness. Her poetical vein seldom rose above the fanciful, but in her vivacity there was both wit and cheerfulness. She needed apparently but the provocation of a wider social inspiration to become very clever and apt in jeux d'esprit and epigrams, as a few specimens which found their way into the journals amply indicated. It was however in such pieces as "Jack Frost", "The Pebble and the Acorn", and other effusions devoted to graceful details of nature, or suggestive incidents in life, that the public recognised the graceful play of her muse. No outdoor forms of life were too simple or too tiny for her to notice. She made things of nature think and speak as if they were real persons. Often by a dainty touch, or lively prelude, gentle raillery revealed itself, and in this respect, Gould manifested a decided individuality. Gould seemed as fond as Aesop or La Fontaine of investing every thing in nature with a human intelligence. It was surprising to see how frequently and how happily birds, insects, trees, flowers, and pebbles were made her colloquists.

== Selected works ==
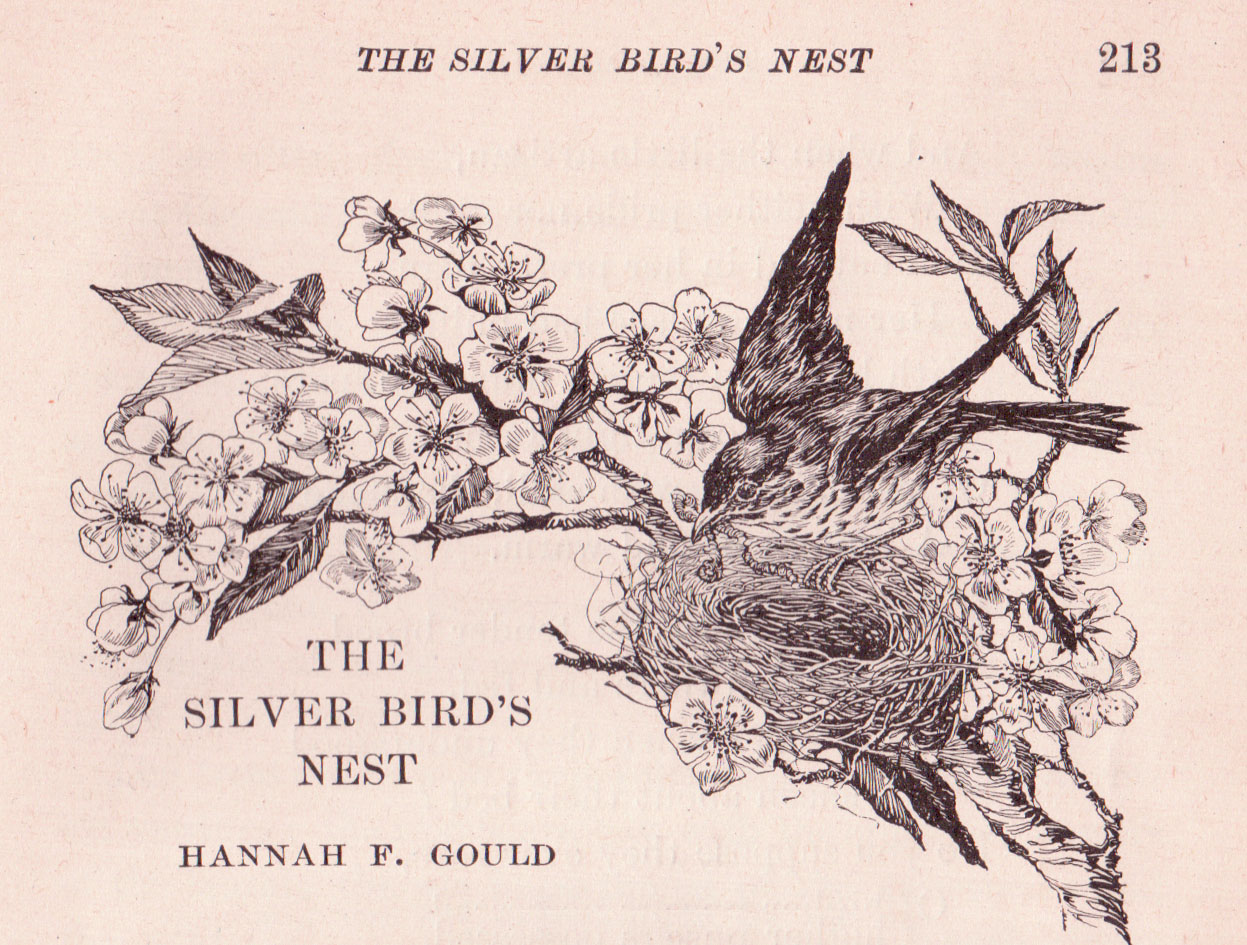
Illustration for the poem The Silver Bird's Nest by Hannah F. Gould from a child's reading book "Williams's Choice Literature Book 4" by Sherman Williams

- Poems (Boston: Hilliard, Gray, Little, and Wilkins, 1832)
- Esther: A Scriptural Narrative (New York: D. Appleton, 1835)
- Poems (3 vols., Boston: Hilliard, Gray & Co., 1836)
- The Golden Vase, a Gift for the Young (Boston: Benjamin J. Mussey, 1843)
- Gathered Leaves and Miscellaneous Papers (Boston: William J. Reynolds, 1846)
- New Poems (Boston: William J. Reynolds & Co., 1850)
- The Diosma: a Perennial (Boston: Phillips, Sampson, & Co., 1851)
- The Youth's Coronal (New York: D. Appleton & Co., 1851)
- The Mother's Dream, and other Poems (Boston: Crosby, Nichols, & Co., 1853)
- Hymns and Other Poems for Children (Boston: William J. Reynolds & Co., 1854)
- Poems for Little Ones (Boston: Taggard & Thompson, 1863)
