= Helen Vickroy Austin =

American journalist, horticulturist, suffragist

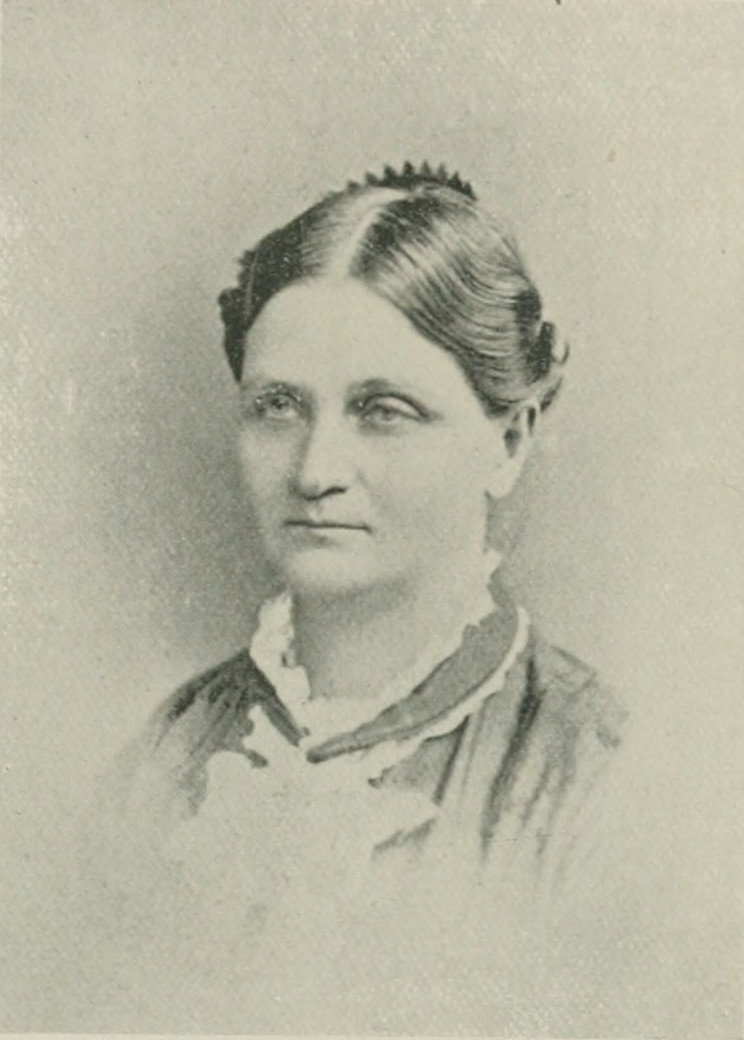
- Photo in A Woman of the Century
- Born: Helen Vickroy; July 19, 1829; Miamisburg, Ohio, U.S.
- Died: August 1, 1921 (aged 92)
- Resting place: Earlham Cemetery, Richmond, Indiana, U.S.
- Occupations: journalist; horticulturist
- Spouse: William W. Austin (m. 1850)

Helen Vickroy Austin (née Vickroy; July 19, 1829 – August 1, 1921) was an American journalist, essayists, and horticulturist. Born in Ohio, she began writing for the agricultural and horticultural press, and her essays on these topics brought her recognition. Austin also wrote sketches and essays for the local press and was a reporter and correspondent. She was a supporter of philanthropic work, temperance, and woman suffrage, and was a life member of the National Woman's Indian Rights Association.

== Biography ==
Helen Vickroy was born in Miamisburg, Ohio, on July 19, 1829. She was a daughter of Edwin Augustus and Cornelia Harlan Vickroy. Her mother was a daughter of the Hon. George Harlen, of Warren County, Ohio. Her father was a son of Thomas Vickroy, of Pennsylvania, a surveyor and extensive landowner, who was a soldier in the American Revolutionary War under George Washington. When Austin was a child, the family removed to Pennsylvania and established a homestead in Ferndale.

In 1850, she married William W. Austin, a native of Philadelphia, at that time residing at Richmond, Indiana, where the couple first lived. In 1885, the family removed to Vineland, New Jersey. Of her three children, two sons died in childhood.

Austin did considerable writing. Some of her best work was for the agricultural and horticultural press, and her essays at the horticultural meetings and interest in such matters gave her notability in horticultural circles. She was also a writer of sketches and essays and worked as a reporter and correspondent. Much of her work was of a fugitive nature for the local press. She also wrote in aid of philanthropic work. She was for many years identified with the cause of woman suffrage, and various other woman's causes.

Long before the Women's Crusade, Austin was a pronounced advocate of temperance. While in her teens, she was a member of "Daughters of Temperance", the women's group of Sons of Temperance. She was a life member of the National Woman's Indian Rights Association, and was a member of the American Pomological Society.

Helen Vickroy Austin died in 1921 and is buried in Earlham Cemetery, Richmond, Indiana.
