= Stephen Venard =

American lawman, road agent hunter (c.1823–1891)

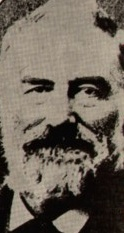
- Steve Venard, c. 1880s
- Born: c. 1823; Lebanon, Ohio, U.S.
- Died: May 20, 1891 (aged 67–68); Nevada City, California, U.S.
- Resting place: Pioneer Cemetery, Nevada City, California, U.S.
- Other name: Steve Venard
- Education: Waynesville Academy
- Known for: Old West lawman; killed six road agents; 1866 Henry rifle duel at Myers' Ravine
- Police career
- Law enforcement service: Nevada County Deputy Sheriff; Nevada City Marshal; Wells Fargo guard and detective
- Allegiance: United States
- Service years: 1850s–1880s
- Rank: Deputy Sheriff; City Marshal; Lieutenant Colonel (Governor Frederick Low’s staff)
- Awards: Gold-mounted Henry rifle (presented by Wells Fargo); appointment to Governor’s staff
- Other work: Miner; grocer; partner in Empire Mining Company; partner in Detective Mine

Stephen "Steve" Venard (c. 1823 – May 20, 1891) was an American lawman, and renowned road agent killer in Northern California. In the course of his career, he killed six highwaymen and made several important captures. He is known for participating in one of the classic gun duels of the Old West, and for being one of the most fearless lawmen of the California Gold Rush era.

== Early years ==
Stephen Venard was born c. 1823, on a farm in Lebanon, Ohio. He received his education at Waynesville Academy in Waynesville, Ohio.

After moving to Newport (now Fountain City), Indiana, Venard became the first teacher of the joint town and township school. Because of his participation with the Underground Railroad, a bounty was put on him, so he headed to California in March 1850 with a group of 24 others in covered wagons, arriving in September 1850.

== Career ==
Early on upon reaching California's Gold Country, Venard tried his hand at gold mining, settling first in Colfax, but by December 1850, he had moved to the North Fork of the American River. In 1851, he moved again, through Downieville, and then to Nevada City. He decided to make Nevada City his home, and by 1853, had opened a grocery store on Broad Street. By 1854, he became a partner in operating the Empire Mining Company. In 1855, he became a Nevada County deputy but resigned the following year. He ran for the office of Sheriff against Henry Plummer in 1857 but lost.

In 1864, Venard was elected a part-time City Marshal in Nevada City. He also worked as a detective, Wells Fargo guard and special officer.

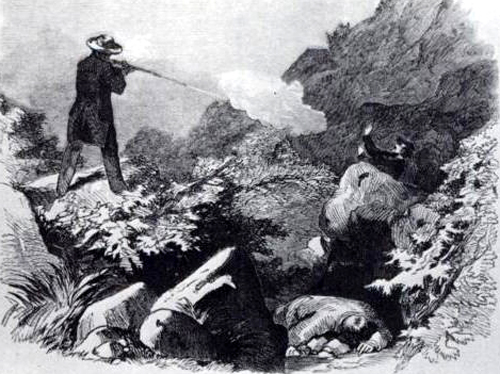
Venard on the job

Considered at the time as the "most remarkable cleanup of road agents on record", Venard tracked and killed three Wells Fargo stagecoach robbers on May 15, 1866, in the Yuba River's Myers' Ravine with four shots from his Henry rifle, returned the stolen $8,000 (~$134,203 in 2024) of gold dust, and then apologized for the excess shot. When offered a reward by Wells Fargo, Venard accepted only half, and split the rest with his posse. He received an inscribed, gold-mounted Henry rifle from Wells Fargo, and Governor Frederick Low appointed Venard to his personal staff with the rank of Lieutenant Colonel for "meritorious services in the field". According to Harper's Weekly, "No romance could depict greater bravery".

The Henry rifle hangs in the Wells Fargo Museum in San Francisco, California.

In June 1866, Venard was appointed resident deputy sheriff at Meadow Lake City; here, he was appointed City Marshall and became a member of the Meadow Lake Yachting Club. By 1869, he was commissioned as a Deputy Sheriff. After being sent to Sonoma County in 1871 to investigate the Houx Gang, a group of Wells Fargo stage robbers, Venard played an important role in the capture of John Houx.

After retiring from his career as a lawman due to advancing age and chronic rheumatism, Venard became a partner in 1888 in the Detective Mine on Cement Hill.

== Personal life ==
Venard was almost six feet (180 cm) tall. He had wavy black hair, and a full beard. Never married, he spent his leisure time reading books at the Library Association.

Venard died of kidney failure on May 20, 1891, in Nevada City. Having died penniless, his friends paid for his burial at Nevada City's Pioneer Cemetery.
