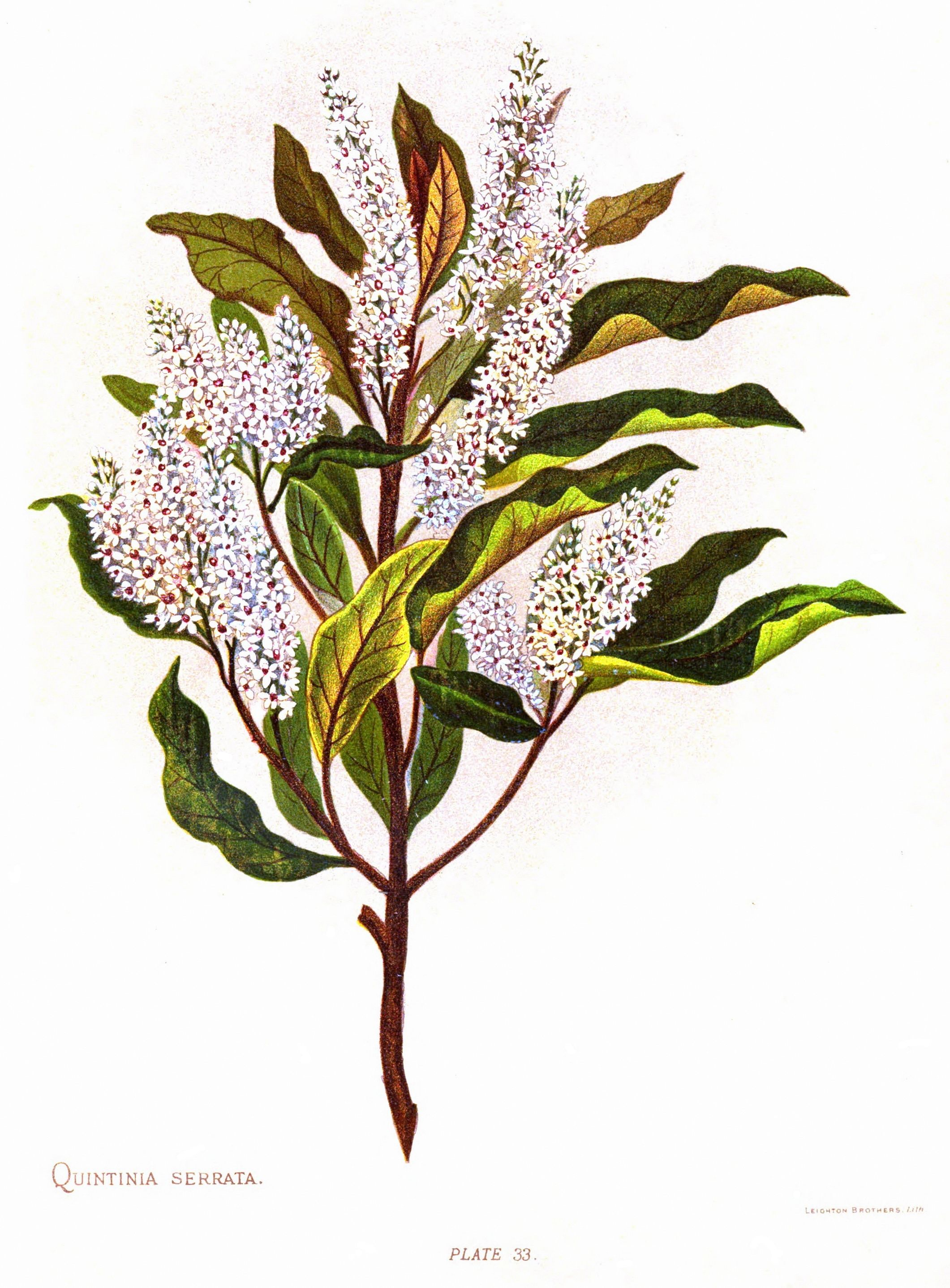
- Quintina serrata, illustration, 1888

Conservation status
- Least Concern (IUCN 3.1)

Scientific classification
- Kingdom: Plantae
- Clade: Embryophytes
- Clade: Tracheophytes
- Clade: Spermatophytes
- Clade: Angiosperms
- Clade: Eudicots
- Clade: Asterids
- Order: Paracryphiales
- Family: Paracryphiaceae
- Genus: Quintinia
- Species: Q. serrata

Binomial name
- Quintinia serrata A.Cunn., 1839

Synonyms
- Quintinia acutifolia Kirk; Quintinia elliptica Hook. f.

= Quintinia serrata =

Species of tree

Quintinia serrata, commonly known as tāwheowheo, is a species of evergreen tree in the genus Quintinia. It is endemic to New Zealand.

This plant has different patterns of anthocyanins (cyanidin 3-O-glucoside and cyanidin 3-O-galactoside) in its leaves to protect the shade-adapted chloroplasts from direct sun light.
