= Pink Pearl (apple) =

Apple cultivar

'Pink Pearl' apple
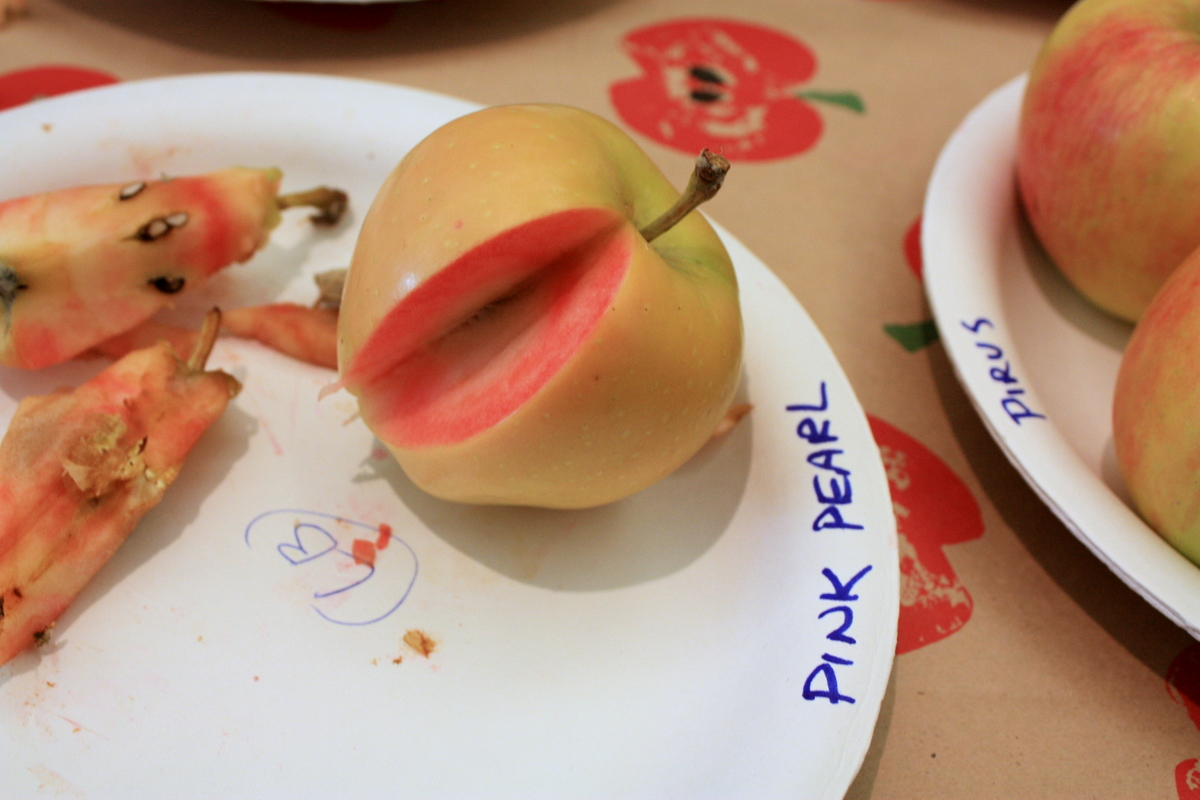
- Genus: Malus
- Species: Malus domestica (× Malus niedzwetskyana?)
- Hybrid parentage: 'Seedling of 'Surprise'
- Cultivar: 'Pink Pearl'
- Origin: USA

The 'Pink Pearl' apple is a pink-fleshed apple cultivar developed in 1944 by Albert Etter, a northern California plant breeder. It is a seedling of 'Surprise', another pink-fleshed apple that is believed to be a descendant of Malus niedzwetskyana.

== History ==
In 1940, after many years of work on breeding red-fleshed apples, Etter set up a partnership with George Roeding Jr.'s California Nursery Company, one of the goals of which was to introduce some of Etter's Surprise-derived cultivars to the public. Eventually Roeding settled on test seedling #39, which apparently impressed him with its looks (translucent skin, medium size, and tapered shape), its tart-sweet flavor, and its late-summer ripening date. He secured U.S. plant patent 723 for it on Etter's behalf, named it 'Pink Pearl', and featured it in his 1945 catalog.

'Pink Pearl' apples are generally medium-sized, with a conical shape. They are named for the color of their flesh, which is a bright rosy pink sometimes streaked or mottled with white. They have a translucent, yellow-green skin, and a crisp, juicy flesh with tart to sweet-tart taste. 'Pink Pearl' apples ripen in late August to mid-September. It is susceptible to apple scab, and the fruit tend not to keep well on the tree once ripe.

Among Pink Pearl's descendants is 'Pink Princess', a carmine-striped apple with pink to dark pink flesh. It was originally named 'Pink Lady' by its developer, Fred Jansen of Ontario, Canada, but Jansen did not trademark the name and it was subsequently taken over for a quite different Australian apple, to Cripps Pink a.k.a. Pink Lady, forcing Jansen to change the name of his own apple.
