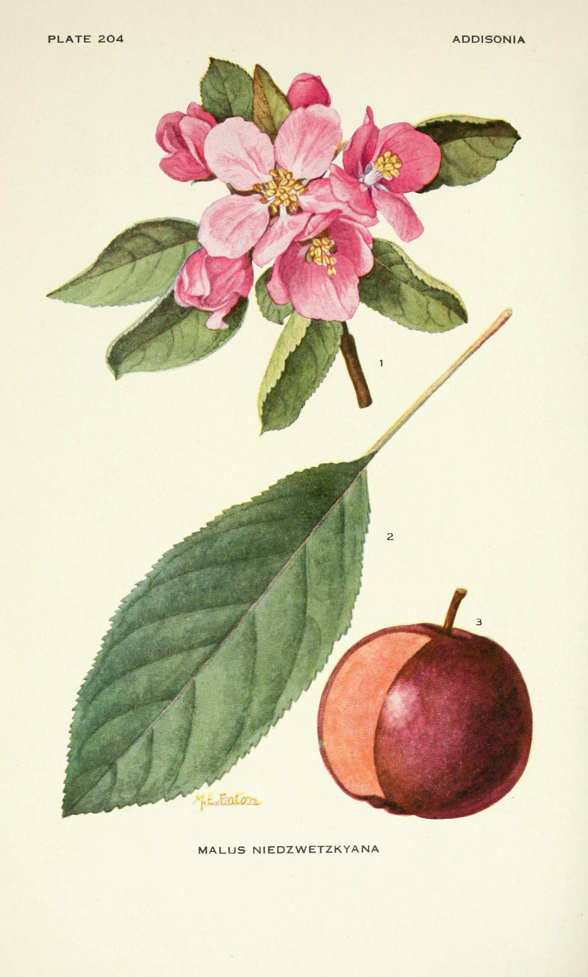
- Illustration of Malus niedzwetzkyana from a 1921 botanical compendium

Conservation status
- Endangered (IUCN 3.1)

Scientific classification
- Kingdom: Plantae
- Clade: Tracheophytes
- Clade: Angiosperms
- Clade: Eudicots
- Clade: Rosids
- Order: Rosales
- Family: Rosaceae
- Genus: Malus
- Species: M. niedzwetzkyana

Binomial name
- Malus niedzwetzkyana Dieck ex Koehne

= Malus niedzwetzkyana =

Niedzwetzky's apple

Species of apple tree

Malus niedzwetzkyana, or Niedzwetzky's apple, is a kind of apple native to Asia noted for its red-fleshed, red-skinned fruit and red flowers. Some botanists consider it a distinct species, while others have argued that it is simply an unusual variety of the common apple. It is listed as an endangered species globally by IUCN.

== Description ==
The tree is winter-hardy and drought-resistant, growing 5–8 m (16–26 ft) tall in the wild (<5 m under cultivation), with a globular crown and very dark purplish-brown bark.

New shoots are dark purple, and leaves range from purplish when new to dark green when mature. In the spring it puts out intensely magenta-rose flowers. The skin of the fruit is deep red to purple-red (sometimes with a bluish, waxy bloom) and the flesh ranges from light to bright red, with dark reddish-brown seeds.

The fruit is edible and not very tart, with dry, somewhat chewy flesh. In the Kashgar region of China near the Kyrgyzstan and Tajikistan borders, it is known as 'kisil alma': 'red apple'.

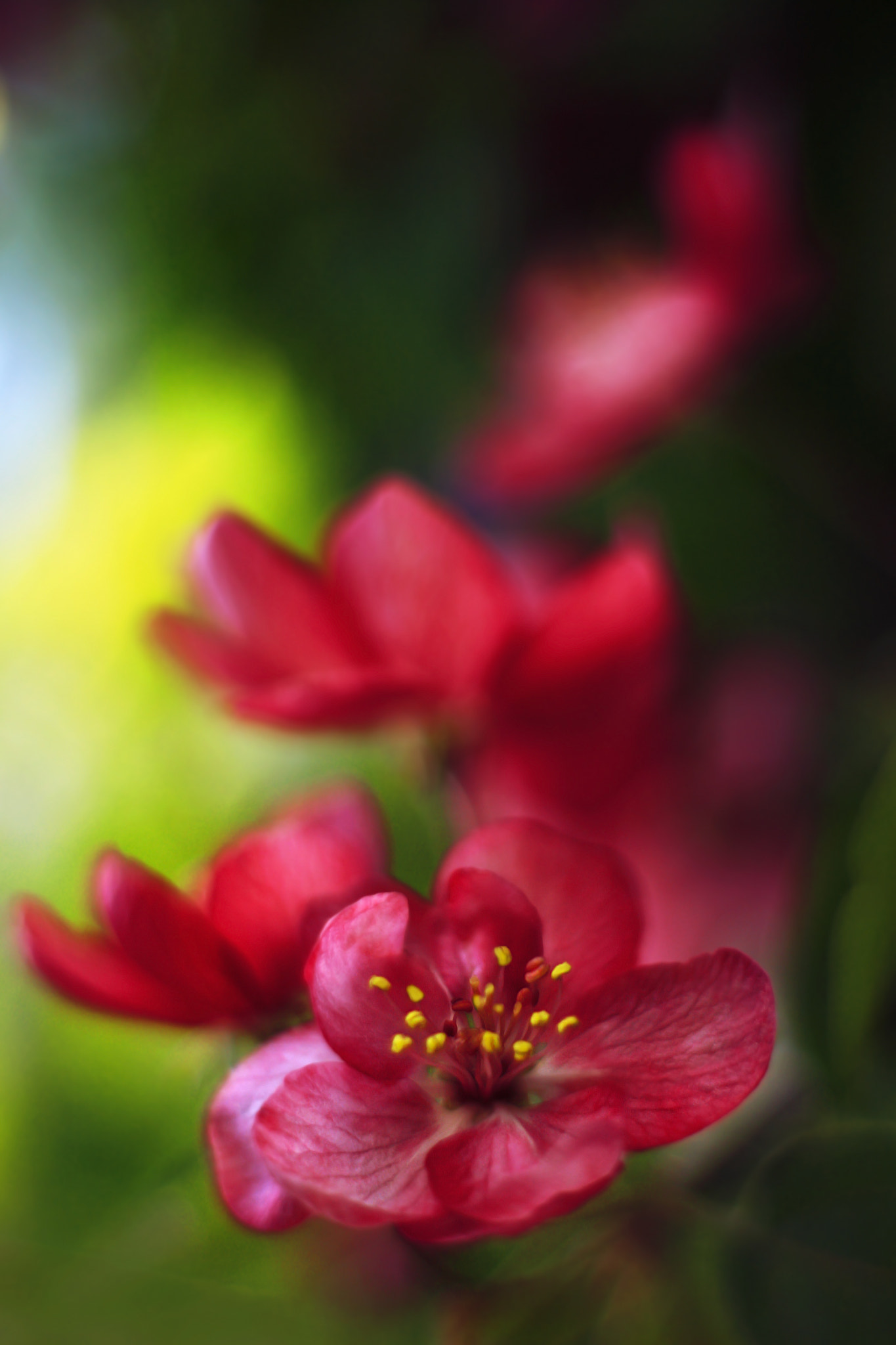
Flower detail

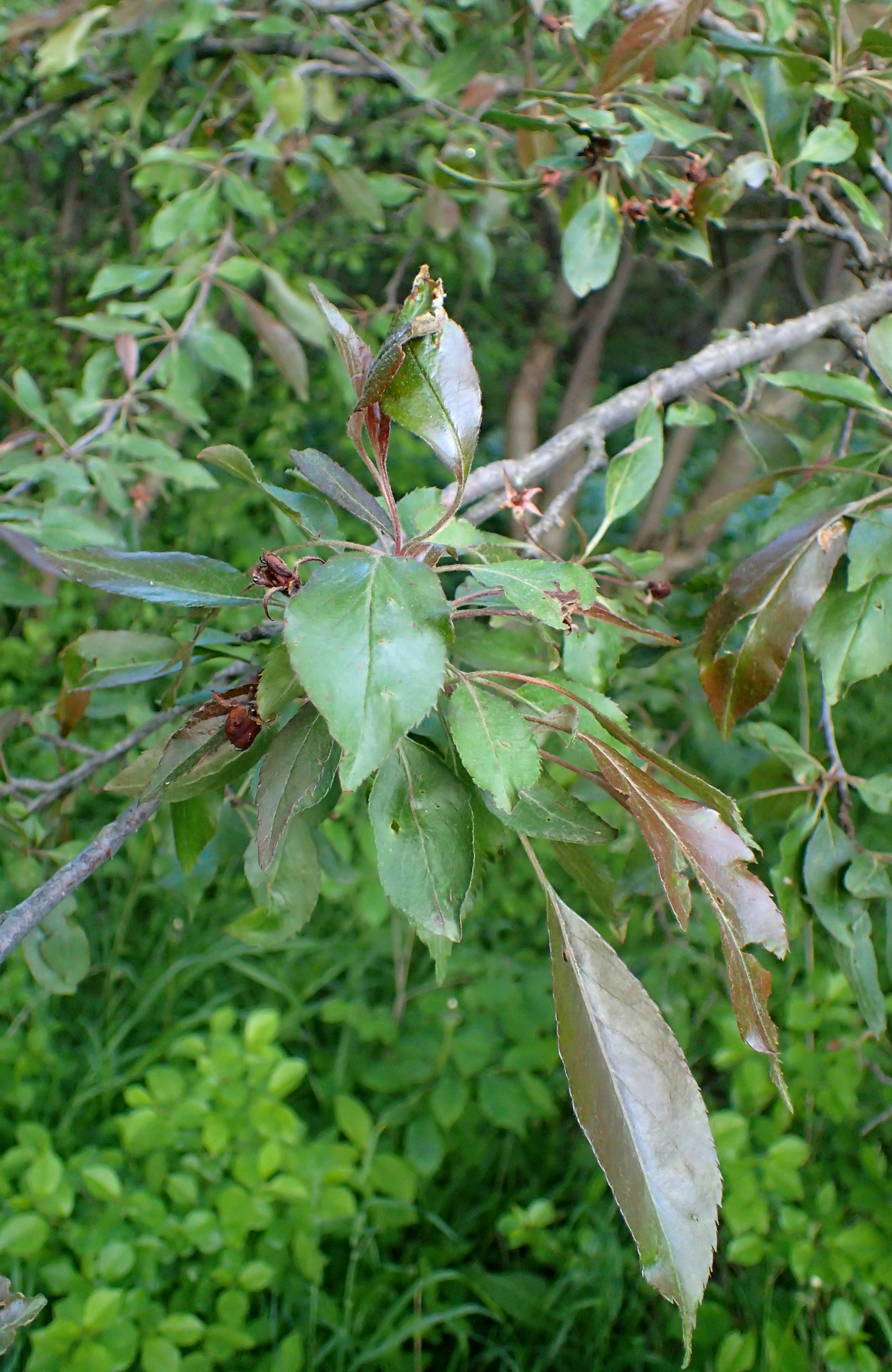
Foliage

== Taxonomy ==
Some botanists consider it a distinct species, while others have argued that it is simply an unusual variety of the common apple.

== Distribution and habitat ==
The species is native to certain parts of China, Afghanistan, Kazakhstan, Kyrgyzstan, and Uzbekistan.

The tree was introduced to the West c. 1890 by Georg Dieck at the Zöschen Arboretum, Germany, who grew it from seed sent by the Russian lawyer and amateur botanist Vladislav E. Niedzwiecki living in exile in Turkestan; Dieck later donated specimens to the Späth nursery, which exported the tree to the US c. 1896.

== Conservation ==
Niedzwetzky's apple is rare, often growing as an isolated tree, and is classified as endangered throughout its range in the IUCN Red List. Only a few hundred specimens of the tree are known to survive in Kyrgyzstan. The conservation group Fauna & Flora International is working to save and restore the species in that country, and has put M. niedzwetzkyana on its endangered list, brought it under its Global Trees Campaign, and planted over 1,000 saplings in area forests in 2010 and 2011.

== Cultivation ==
Malus niedzwetzkyana has been used to breed some modern red-leaved, red-flowered, and red-fruited apples and crabapples. It is believed to be the ancestor of Surprise, a pink-fleshed apple that was brought to the United States by German immigrants around 1840 and was later used by the horticulturist Albert Etter to breed some 30 pink- and red-fleshed varieties, the best-known of which is Pink Pearl. Another horticulturist, Niels Ebbesen Hansen, encountered M. niedzwetzkyana in the Ili valley, where he also met Niedzwetzky, in what was then the Russian region of Turkestan (but now Kazakhstan) during his 1897 expedition. Hansen began two breeding programs based on this unusual fruit, one aimed at developing a cold-hardy cooking and eating apple, and the other aimed at developing ornamental crabapples. His efforts resulted in the Almata apple and the Hopa crabapple, among other varieties. Some of these apples, as well as M. niedzwetzkyana itself, are being used for small-scale commercial production of rosé apple ciders.

=== Cultivars ===
- 'Red Vein'

== See also ==
- Applecrab
- Malus sieversii
