= Albert Etter =

American plant breeder (1872–1950)

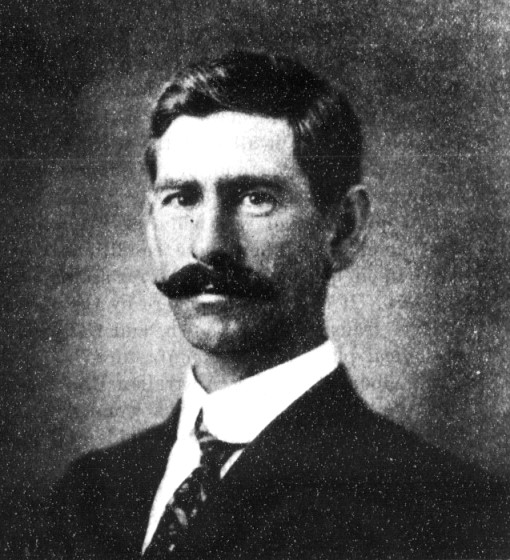
- Born: Albert Felix Etter; November 29, 1872; El Dorado County, California, U.S.
- Died: November 12, 1950 (aged 77); Ettersburg, California, U.S.
- Known for: Hybridizations, especially strawberry and apple
- Scientific career
- Fields: Horticulture

Albert Etter (1872–1950) was an American plant breeder best known for his work on strawberry and apple varieties.

== Early life and education ==
Albert Felix Etter was born near Shingle Springs in El Dorado County, California, on November 27, 1872. He was one of ten surviving children of the Swiss-born Benjamin Etter (d. 1889), all but one of whom were boys. Around 1876 the family moved to Humboldt County, where Benjamin acquired a farm near Ferndale and became the first person to grow lentils in the county.

== Development of Ettersburg ==
Albert's German-born mother, Wilhelmina (Kern) Etter (d. 1913) was skilled at cultivating plants, and Etter showed a talent for hybridizing plants in childhood, working with apples, peaches, dahlias, and strawberries by the time he was twelve. He attended public school and by the end of his teens was looking for a site where he could continue his plant-breeding experiments. On a fishing trip to the Mattole River Valley, he found a section of land above Bear Creek and in 1894 he staked a claim to it. This area along the Pacific coast in the King Range has wet winters and hot summers, and Etter later attributed his success partly to his choice of location. The site where Etter developed his ranch was subsequently named after him, first as Etter and then as Ettersburg.

Etter managed the ranch with three of his brothers, George, Fred, and August; and another four of his siblings also lived nearby. While Etter focused on plant breeding, his brothers oversaw other kinds of farming and stockkeeping operations. The ranch holdings, operated under the business name Etter Brothers, eventually reached 800 acres in size. Etter wrote about his "Mountain Home of Sciences" in 1907. Although the Etter Brothers firm and the Ettersburg Experimental Place became internationally known among plant breeders, and Etter renowned as "the Luther Burbank of Humboldt County", they never made more than a modest living from the land. For one thing, they were far removed from the main trucking and rail routes, and for another, new plant hybrids were not protected by the patent system until 1930.

Etter was sometimes compared to Luther Burbank. In 1907 it was noted that Etter '... resents such appellations as "wizard" and "Burbank of Humboldt,” and declared that plain Albert Etter is a good enough title to go by.' In 1908, Etter visited Luther Burbank in Santa Rosa. Burbank commented that Santa Rosa was not favorable for apples. He left him with the advice "Have confidence In yourself and look out for people with schemes to help you.”

== Strawberry breeding ==
Etter became known for his insistence on the value of using unimproved parent material, often taken from wild strains, and he frequently made 'wide' crosses between widely divergent genetic types. In his work with strawberries, he showed other breeders the value of the beach strawberry (Fragaria chiloensis) as a source of germplasm conveying vigor, productivity, flavor, and disease resistance. He also worked in a more minor way with F. virginiana species. The Pacific Rural Press described his methods for strawberries and other plants in 1912.

By 1910, Ettersburg 121 had become the leading variety in the Willamette Valley, Oregon, because its firm flesh, high color, and strong flavor meant that it canned well. In 1912, you could get a gift of a dozen plants with your subscription to the Pacific Rural Press.

In 1914, the press anticipated Etter's strawberry exhibit at the 1915 world's fair. In 1915, Etter exhibited his strawberries at the Panama-Pacific International Exposition. "Among the other valuable features of the California Section were the strawberries of Albert Etter of Briceland, Humboldt County, California. Etter had made a study of the soul and vital essence of the American shortcake for twenty-six years and had produced so many varieties the writer can't believe his own notes on the subject."

By 1920, Etter's catalog showcased over 50 new varieties, some of which achieved limited commercial success. None are commercially important today, although their germplasm continues in a number of modern cultivars. In 1928, he donated all his strawberry material to the University of California, where his Ettersburg 121 became an ancestor of various commercially important varieties.

=== Strawberry varieties ===
- Beaderarena
- Ettersburg 80 (Huxley)
- Ettersburg 121 (an ancestor of the Northwest)
- Ettersburg 450 (an ancestor of the Fairfax)
- Fendalcino
- Rose Ettersburg
- Trebla (also known as Ettersburg Trebla)

== Apple breeding ==
In 1899 it was reported that Albert Etter, with the help of the University of California, was establishing a private experimental orchard near Briceland. Etter started with 62 varieties in 1898 and received several hundred more varieties in 1899. Years later Etter wrote about apple breeding at Ettersberg in the Pacific Rural Press (1922) He said that "the anniversary of my arrival here to begin operations was afterward made National Apple Day—the 17th of October." The Pacific Rural Press reported that he had 10,000 varieties of apples. He started with almost 600 apple varieties. These were gathered from America and Europe, with the help of Charles Howard Shinn, when he was Inspector of California Experiment Stations, between 1890 and 1901.

In 1907 and 1909 a number of Etter's apple varieties were offered in the annual distribution of seeds and plants from the University of California. In 1919 it was reported that he had hybridized the native California crabapple with the Oregon crabapple and had created a fruit one inch in diameter with a brilliant color. In 1924, the Livermore Journal reported that he was about to introduce 75 different apple varieties.

In the late 1920s, Etter shifted his attention to apple breeding, using scion wood gleaned from a number of sources including the University of California. He felt that the west coast climate called for new kinds of apples, and he began experimenting with wide crosses, especially between apples and crabapples. Although many of his apple strains have been lost, those that survive include Pink Pearl, the best-known of his unusual series of some two dozen pink- and red-fleshed cultivars based on a European apple called Surprise (itself probably a descendant of Malus niedzwetskyana). Some eastern and midwestern breeders, including Liberty Hyde Bailey and Charles Downing had already made some experiments with Surprise and been unhappy with the results, but Etter found that it worked better as part of a west-coast breeding program.

By 1928, Etter was far enough along in his breeding experiments to publish a preliminary report in the Pacific Rural Press, where he wrote about two of his pink-fleshed cultivars, the Redflesh Winter Banana and a nameless seedling that, by its description, might have been Pink Pearl. Subsequently, the midwestern breeder Niels Ebbesen Hansen worked on breeding red-fleshed apples and crabapples, expressing disappointment when he found that Etter had beaten him to the punch. Although not all of Etter's Surprise descendants were successful, the best of them shared a pronounced aromatic quality that appears to be linked to the anthocyanin pigmentation that gives the flesh its distinctive pinkish and reddish tones. In 1930 Etter introduced a flavorful juicy bright red red-fleshed apple at an apple show in Eureka. Several boxes were sent to hotels throughout the country.

In 1940, Etter began a partnership with George Roeding Jr., the owner of the California Nursery Company in Niles (now a district of Fremont, California). Their goal was to patent and market Etter's best apple varieties. The California Nursery Company introduced six Etter varieties in its 1944 catalog – Pink Pearl and five apples with regular non-pigmented flesh (Alaska, All Gold, Humboldt Crab, Jonwin, and Wickson). A seventh apple, Crimson Gold, was introduced in the 1947 catalog. The 1970 catalog carried only five varieties of Etter's apples: Alaska, Etter's Gold, Jonwin, Pink Pearl, and Wickson. A flyer with "Distinctive New Recipes...for the Apples of Albert Etter" was provided in the 1945 catalog. Recipes were by Robert Stoney Mayock who was a winemaker (Los Amigos Vineyards in Irvington), amateur chef, gourmet, and food columnist.

=== Apple varieties ===
- Alaska (a white apple, originally Bedfordshire Junior; U.S. patent #699, June 18, 1946)
- Crimson Gold (originally Little Rosybloom)
- Etter's Gold (originally Allgold; U.S. patent #659, April 28, 1945)
- Hoover Redflesh
- Humboldt (originally Jumbo Transcendent; U.S. patent #658, June 5, 1945)
- Jonwin (U.S. patent #710, Sept. 17, 1946)
- Katharine (named for Etter's wife)
- Pink Pearl (U.S. patent #723, June 23, 1944)
- Redflesh Spizenberg
- Redflesh Winter Banana
- Waltana (named for Etter's brother Walter and his wife)
- Wickson crabapple (named for Edward J. Wickson; U.S. patent #724, March 4, 1947)

== Other plant breeding ==
Etter also experimented with breeding over a hundred varieties of forage plants, grasses, and clovers. His research showed that some of the large white clovers from southern Europe were suitable for Humboldt County dairy farmers to use for forage because they put on a great deal of growth during the winter. He also undertook some experiments with tree nut crops such as English walnuts, chestnuts and filberts.

Etter was a member of the California Nurserymen's Association and the American Pomological Society, and he was president of the Ettersburg Farm Center (a branch of the Humboldt County Farm Bureau).

Etter died in November 1950. His wife Katharine (born Katharine McCormick in 1891) outlived him by nearly three decades, dying in 1979. In the 1970s, apple fancier Ram Fishman visited the remains of Etter's experimental orchard and found over one hundred trees still thriving. On many of these trees, multiple test varieties were represented, often by a single grafted branch. Fishman ultimately located about half of Etter's pink-fleshed varieties in the test orchard and in nearby areas, and in 1983 he founded the Greenmantle Nursery to make seven of them available to the public. They were given new names since the old names could not be firmly determined and are marketed under the Rosetta series title.

== Catalogs ==
- Albert F. Etter founder of Ettersburg Experiment Place ... Ettersburg, Humboldt County ..., 1914
- The Ettersburg strawberry originated by Albert F. Etter, Briceland, Cal., 1916
- Ettersburg strawberries: descriptive, prices and testimonials, 1917
- Ettersburg strawberries, describing varieties and breeding methods as practiced at Ettersburg Experiment Place, Ettersburg, Humboldt County, 1920
- Ettersburg strawberries : origin and history [description and prices], 1926
- The California Nursery Company catalogs in California Revealed

== Publications ==
- "Albert Etter: Fruit Breeder", The American Pomological Journal
- "Albert Etter – Strawberry Breeder", The American Pomological Journal
- "Albert Etter; Humboldt County's Horticultural Genius"

== See also ==
- Applecrab
- Pink Pearl (apple)
- Crimson Gold (apple)
- Ettersburg, California
