= Catherine Hayes Bailey =

American geneticist (1921-2014)

- Born: May 9, 1921; New Brunswick, N.J
- Died: March 29, 2014 (aged 92); Vermont
- Occupation: Plant Geneticist
- Known for: Honored by the Peach Council for her contributions to the US peach industry

Catherine Hayes Bailey (May 9, 1921 – March 29, 2014) was an American plant geneticist known for developing new varieties of fruit. She was honored by the National Peach Council for her contributions to the US peach industry.

== Early life and education ==
Bailey was born in New Brunswick, New Jersey; her father was superintendent for the Rutgers Vegetable Farm. She received her bachelor's degree from Douglass College in 1942. She worked with Rutgers horticulturist Maurice Blake, and ran his stone-fruit growing program until 1948. Encouraged by Blake, she entered the Ph.D. program at Rutgers University, and graduated in 1957 with a dissertation on aspects of growing peach cultivars. Bailey was a Baptist, and had also attended Prairie Bible Institute in Canada.

== Research ==
After finishing her doctorate, Bailey stayed on at Rutgers as a professor, a position she held until her retirement in 1980. She continued her work in the Rutgers program with Fred Hough, expanding it from growing just peaches and apples and developing nectarine and apricot cultivars; during her career, she introduced more than 39 new fruit varieties, including many new (patented) apples. She was particularly known for her work on the genetic inheritance of ripening times.

== Honors and awards ==
Bailey was honored by the National Peach Council for her contributions to the US peach industry. She was listed in American Men and Women of Science in the 1992-1993 edition. She was a member of several professional societies, including the International Society for Horticultural Science, the American Society for Horticultural Science, and the American Pomological Society.

== Personal life and death ==
Bailey was unmarried and lived with her parents until their death. After retirement she moved to Vermont, where she died on March 29, 2014.
