= Idaein =

Names
- IUPAC name (2S,4S,5R)-2-[2-(3,4-dihydroxyphenyl)-5,7-dihydroxychromenylium-3-yl]oxy-6-(hydroxymethyl)oxane-3,4,5-triol;chloride
- Other names Ideain, cyanidin 3-O-galactoside, Cy3Gal

Identifiers
CAS Number	27661-36-5
3D model (JSmol)	Interactive image
ChemSpider	390306
KEGG	C08647
PubChem CID	46783719
UNII	FC7L938Y12
CompTox Dashboard (EPA)	DTXSID60926212 DTXSID80950312, DTXSID60926212
- InChI: InChI=1S/C21H20O11.ClH/c22-7-16-17(27)18(28)19(29)21(32-16)31-15-6-10-12(25)4-9(23)5-14(10)30-20(15)8-1-2-11(24)13(26)3-8;/h1-6,16-19,21-22,27-29H,7H2,(H3-,23,24,25,26);1H/t16?,17-,18-,19?,21+;/m0./s1 Key: YTMNONATNXDQJF-DJBUQWCWSA-N
- SMILES: C1=CC(=C(C=C1C2=C(C=C3C(=CC(=CC3=[O+]2)O)O)OC4C(C(C(C(O4)CO)O)O)O)O)O.[Cl-]

Properties
Chemical formula	C_{21}H_{21}ClO_{11} (chloride), C_{21}H_{21}O_{11}^{+} (cation)
Molar mass	484.83 g/mol (chloride), 449.38 g/mol (cation)
UV-vis (λ_{max})	528 nm (in methanol)
- Except where otherwise noted, data are given for materials in their standard state (at 25 °C [77 °F], 100 kPa). Infobox references

Idaein, also known as ideain, cyanidin 3-O-galactoside, or Cy3Gal, is a type of anthocyanin, a class of plant pigment compounds.

== Natural occurrences ==
Idaein is the main anthocyanin compound in lingonberries (Vaccinium vitis-idaea), and the name of the compound is derived from the Latin name of the plant. It is also present as one of the many anthocyanins compounds found in bilberries (Vaccinium myrtillus) and cranberries (Vaccinium macrocarpon).

Idaein is the main anthocyanin in red-skinned or red-fleshed (for example Weirouge or Surprise) apple varieties. It is also found in Chinese hawthorn fruits (Crataegus spp.). It is also the pigment in the copper beech (cultivar of Fagus sylvatica), that was identified in 1932.

Quintinia serrata, the tawheowheo, a species of evergreen trees endemic to New Zealand, has different patterns of anthocyanins (cyanidin 3-O-glucoside and cyanidin 3-O-galactoside) in its leaves to protect the shade-adapted chloroplasts from direct sunlight.
