= Niels Ebbesen Hansen =

Danish-American horticulturist (1866–1950)

Niels Ebbesen Hansen (January 4, 1866 – October 5, 1950) was a Danish-American horticulturist, botanist, and agricultural explorer for the United States Department of Agriculture and the state of South Dakota. He searched the harsh environments of northern Scandinavia, Siberia, Manchuria, and the dry steppes of the Volga for plant stock that could flourish on the upper Great Plains.

== Biography ==
Niels Ebbesen Hansen was born the youngest of three children in Lustrupholm, Denmark, a small farm, in Ribe County, Denmark. He was the son of Danish-born muralist Andreas Hansen and Bodil Midtgaard. Hansen's mother died when he was a year and a half old. His father married Katrine Petersen two years later. Andreas Hansen emigrated to the United States in 1872 and sent for Katrine and Niels the following year. In 1876, the family moved to Des Moines, Iowa.

Hansen left high school at the beginning of his junior year to work as a messenger for Iowa Secretary of State John A.T. Hull. He saved his money and continued his education through private lessons and in 1883 entered Iowa Agricultural College (Iowa State University) in Ames·. Funding his education continued to be a problem. He took a year off after his freshman year to return to his job with Hull but continued his independent study. Upon turning 18, he received his inheritance from his late mother's estate and was able to finish college without further interruptions

He was induced to return to Iowa State, where he was awarded his Master of Science degree in 1895.

== Career ==
In 1895, South Dakota State College (now South Dakota State University), appointed Hansen to build its Horticultural Department. He also served as the director of the South Dakota Experiment Station at Brookings.

A 1908 portrait of Hansen during his third plant exploration to Russia. He wears his field exploration gear and holds a bundle of alfalfa. Photo courtesy South Dakota Agricultural Heritage Museum.

On an 1897 trip to Russia, he encountered the red-fleshed wild apple Malus niedzwetskyana and began two breeding programs based on this unusual fruit, one aimed at developing a cold-hardy cooking and eating apple, and the other aimed at developing ornamental crabapples. His efforts resulted in the Almata apple and the Hopa crabapple, among other varieties. When he discovered that the northwest apple breeder Albert Etter had beaten him to the punch in creating red-fleshed hybrids, he wrote to concede him priority with the words "Mr. Etter, you have defeated me in my destiny."

A collection of the records, faculty papers, and related materials of Niels Ebbesen Hansen are maintained in the Archives of South Dakota State University.

== Selected works ==
- Notes on the breeding of fruits (1893)
- Fruit stocks where the mercury freezes (1931)
- The wild alfalfas and clovers of Siberia, with a perspective view of the alfalfas of the world (1909)
- Some Sterile And Fertile Plant Hybrids (1926)
- Fruits, old and new and northern plant novelties (1937)

== Other sources ==
- Rumbaugh, M. D N.E. Hansen's contributions to alfalfa breeding in North America (Bulletin / Agricultural Experiment Station, South Dakota State University. 1979)
- Loen, Helen Hansen, The banebryder (the trail breaker): The Travel Records of Niels Ebbesen Hansen, 1897-1934 (Kalamazoo, Mich.: H. Loen. 2002)
- Loen, Helen Hansen, With a Brush and Muslin Bag: the Life of Niels Ebbesen Hansen (Kalamazoo, Mich.: H. Loen. 2003)
- Loen, Helen Hansen, The Journals of Niels Ebbesen Hansen, 1879-1892 (Kalamazoo, Mich.: H. Loen. 2004)
