= John Rock (nurseryman) =

German-born American horticulturalist and nurseryman (1838–1904)

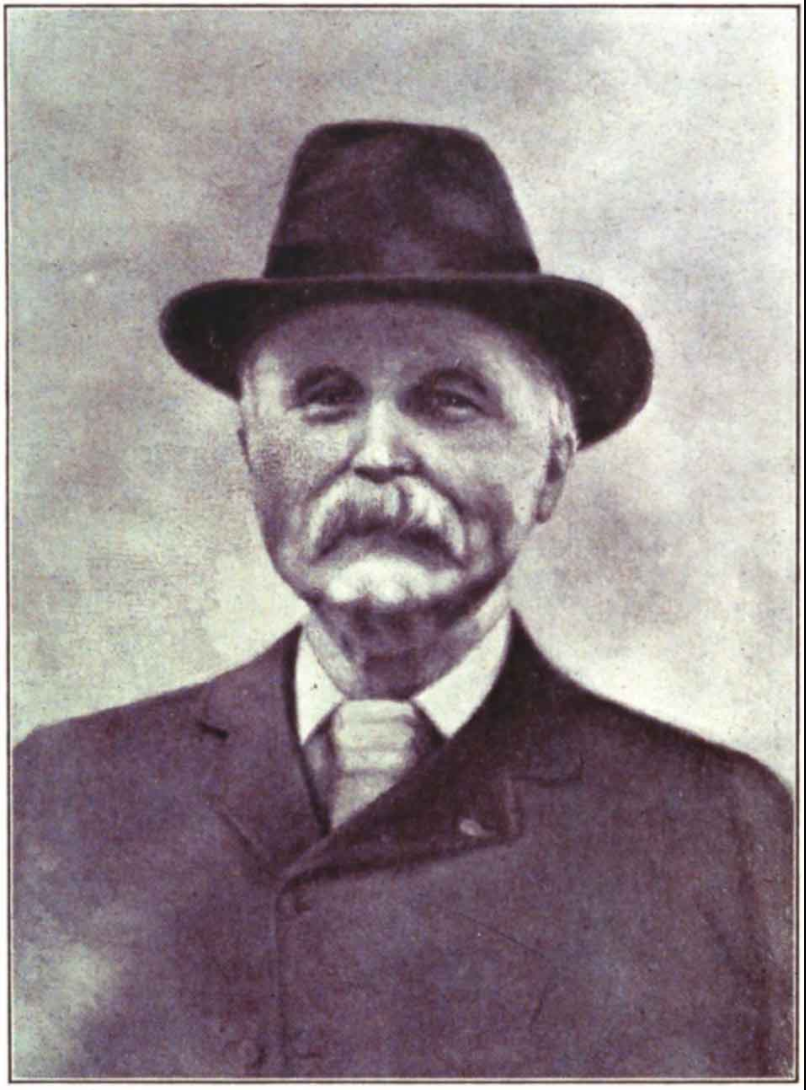
John Rock.

John Rock (August 19, 1838 – August 9, 1904) was a German-born American horticulturalist and nurseryman. John Rock was a leader in California in pomology and the nursery business from 1865 until his death in 1904. Charles Howard Shinn wrote the entry for John Rock in L.H. Bailey's Cyclopedia of Horticulture He said "John Rock's scientific spirit, his wide and ever-increasing knowledge, his very high standards of business and his unselfishness made him during his long life the leader of Pacific coast nurserymen. He introduced more valuable plants and varieties to American horticulture than any other man of his period. His connection with Japan, India, Australia and with the great establishments abroad was close and constant. He did much to encourage men like Luther Burbank, and his collections were always at the service of students and the public."

== Germany ==
Johannes Rock was born in Lauter, today a district of the city of Laubach in the district of Gießen in the state of Hessen in the Federal Republic of Germany. Johannes Rock changed his name to John Rock, possibly when he came to the United States. Some sources incorrectly say that his parents were named Roch or that Johann Fels was his birth name. Church and family records in Germany say that his birth name was Johannes Rock and that his parents were Johann Heinrich Rock V. (1814-1892) and Catharina (born Feldmann) (1811-1861).

== New York ==
By one account John Rock immigrated to the United States when he was 15. However, his passport in 1889 for a trip to Germany says that he was 19 years old and that he had lived in Rochester, New York and in San Jose, California from 1857 to 1887.

For a time he worked for various florists and nurseries, including Ellwanger & Barry in Rochester, New York. He may have worked for the Genesee Valley Nurseries.

His passport in 1889 indicates that he immigrated to the United States aboard the William Tapscott from Liverpool in June 1857 and arrived in New York on August 19, 1857.

== Civil War ==
John Rock enlisted in the 5th Regiment, New York Infantry on April 25, 1861, (or April 11, 1861) also known as Duryee's Zouaves. He served for two years and mustered out on May 14, 1863.

== San Jose ==
After his discharge, John Rock headed to California by way of Panama. He arrived in San Francisco on June 19, 1863. He settled in the Santa Clara Valley and worked at Lick's Mill for James Lick in 1864. Rock was naturalized as an American citizen in 1864 in San Jose, California. Rock married Annie B. Steiger in February 1875.

== Rock's Nurseries in San Jose ==
John Rock established his "Rock's Nurseries" along Coyote Creek in 1865. One of the earliest advertisements (1868) was for mulberry and fruit trees. It says that "J. Rock's Alviso Nursery" was on Coyote Creek across from Lick's Mill. The first nursery was 48 acres on the Milpitas road. The nursery can be seen on Map 2 of the 1876 Thompson & West map. His neighbor was pioneer nurseryman, B.S. Fox. The 28 November 1874 Pacific Rural Press article "Model Nursery" said that the "fiirst premium was awarded by the Santa Clara Valley Agricultural Society, for the best nursery."

In 1879, John Rock was on the board of the first California Horticultural Society, along with Charles Howard Shinn, Dr. John Strentzel, W.B. West, and Dr. Behr. The president was Professor E.W. Hilgard, Vice President was J. Lewelling, Secretary was E.J. Wickson, and the Treasurer was G.P. Rixford.

Around 1880, Rock moved to a location with 138 acres near Wayne Station on the Western Pacific line. This nursery can be seen on "Part of Berryessa & Milpitas Districts Compiled for the Santa Clara Valley" in the Brainard Agricultural Atlas

The San Jose Weekly Mercury wrote about John Rock and his nurseries in 1883 "Our Bonanza; Growth of the Fruit Interest of Santa Clara County; Immense Tracts of Orchards -- Who supplies the trees -- A Progressive Nursery." His first nursery was 3 acres near Alviso. He next secured 40 acres "adjoining Lathrop's addition." His final nursery was 190 acres on the Milpitas Road. His nursery filled orders for Mexico, Nevada, Utah, Oregon, and Washington. A depot was located in downtown San Jose for the convenience of his customers.

Rock continued to sell nursery stock through his "Rock's Nurseries" (at least until 1892) even after the California Nursery Company in Niles was established. The San Jose City Directory for 1887 has advertisements for both "Rock's Nurseries" and the California Nursery Company. The directory for 1892 still listed John Rock under the "nurseries" category. He sold "Fruit & Ornamental Trees, Shrubs, Roses, Flowering Plants, Etc."

Several photos of Rock's Nurseries exist.

== The California Nursery Company ==
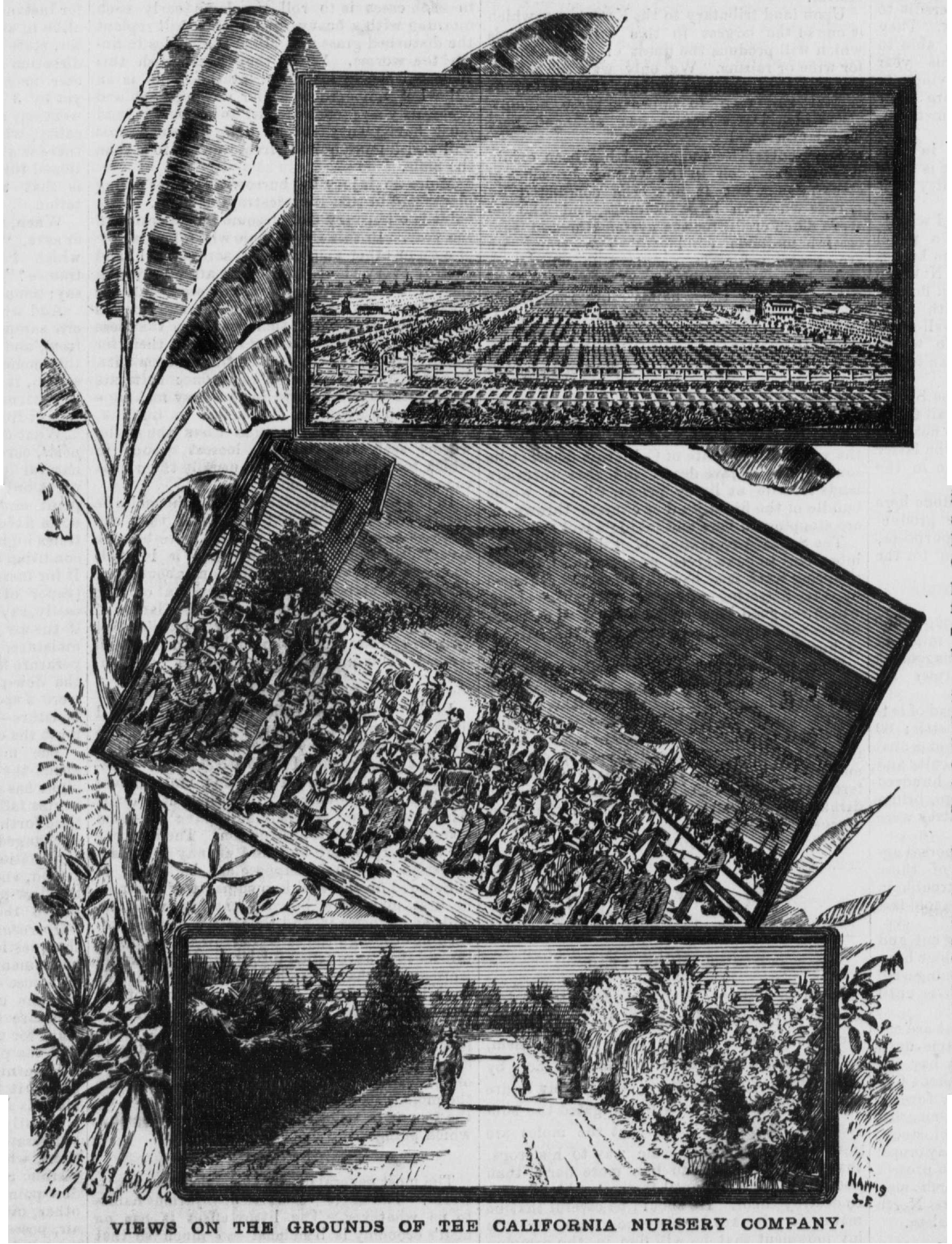
Article in 1888 on "The Nursery Business" features scenes from the California Nursery Company

The California Nursery Company was established and incorporated in 1884 in the town of Niles (now a district of Fremont, California). The December 6, 1884, Pacific Rural Press announced "Nursery Enterprise.--It seems to be the time for great things in the nursery business. It is now announced that John Rock, R. D. Fox, James Hutchison, Thomas Meherin and Wm. J. Landers have associated themselves together in a nursery enterprise. A tract of 500 acres of land near Niles, Alameda county, has been purchased and leased for 15 years to the association, and improvements will begin at once. It is expected to have trees ready for delivery in the fall of 1886. Messrs. Rock & Fox will continue to sell their present stock, and will propagate no more fruit trees in their San Jose establishments but will confine their attention to ornamental growths. The property was bought from Jonas Gilman Clark. The 1886-87 descriptive catalog lists the officers. John Rock was President and R. D. Fox was Vice-president; The directors were John Rock, James Hutchison, R. D. Fox, Thos. Meherin, Wm. J. Landers. John Rock was the manager of the nursery.

The California Nursery Company grew roses, ornamental trees and shrubs, and fruit and nut trees.

A photo of John Rock and R.D. Fox, presumed, was taken in 1887. A photo of Rock, presumed, was taken on the same road, years later, in Niles on a palm lined road leading to the original administration building.

=== Fruit and Nut Trees ===
John Rock was an early believer in fruit growing in the state when others did not think fruit growing could be profitable in California.

The 1902 catalog describes the fruits and nuts that were grown in the nursery's specimen orchard shortly before Rock's death.

George C. Roeding bought the California Nursery Company 13 years after the death of John Rock in 1917. With this purchase, he gained a significant "test orchard" of fruit and nut trees. Roeding wrote about John Rock's "Mother Orchard" and his own specimen trees from his Fancher Creek nurseries in a 1926 publication, "Budwood, scions and cuttings : (embracing over 1000 varieties) from record performance fruit trees" Rock's specimen orchard book from the late 1800s describes fruit varieties and where they were obtained.

=== Figs ===
John Rock had the largest collection of figs on the Pacific Coast as reported by Gustav Eisen in 1901. The figs came from Thomas Rivers & Son, from France, from the USDA (which had obtained the whole collection of the Royal Horticultural Society of London), and from local nurserymen.

=== Olives ===
The Oroville Register said in 1893 about the Hatch & Rock orchard in Biggs: "Mr Rock is one of the most experienced nurserymen in California and he devoted much time to collecting the finest olives in Europe. For this purpose, he visited all the noted olive regions of Spain, France, and Italy and has had agents in every locality to obtain the best olives in the world. As a result, the Rio Bonito orchard contains 156 varieties of olives, which include all the standard and valuable kinds known to man."

=== Catalogs ===
Catalogs for Rock's Nurseries can be found at UC Davis (1873 to 1888).

Catalogs for the California Nursery Company can be found in these collections:

- Henry G. Gilbert Nursery and Seed Trade Catalog Collection for USDA
- Mertz Digital Collections, New York Botanical Garden
- The Biodiversity Heritage Library
- The Internet Archive hosts many of these collections and has an Open Library interface.
- California Revealed hosts the California Nursery Company - Roeding Collection and consists of movies (1932 to 1960s) and catalogs. Some day Rock's Nurseries catalogs may be scanned in.

== Death ==
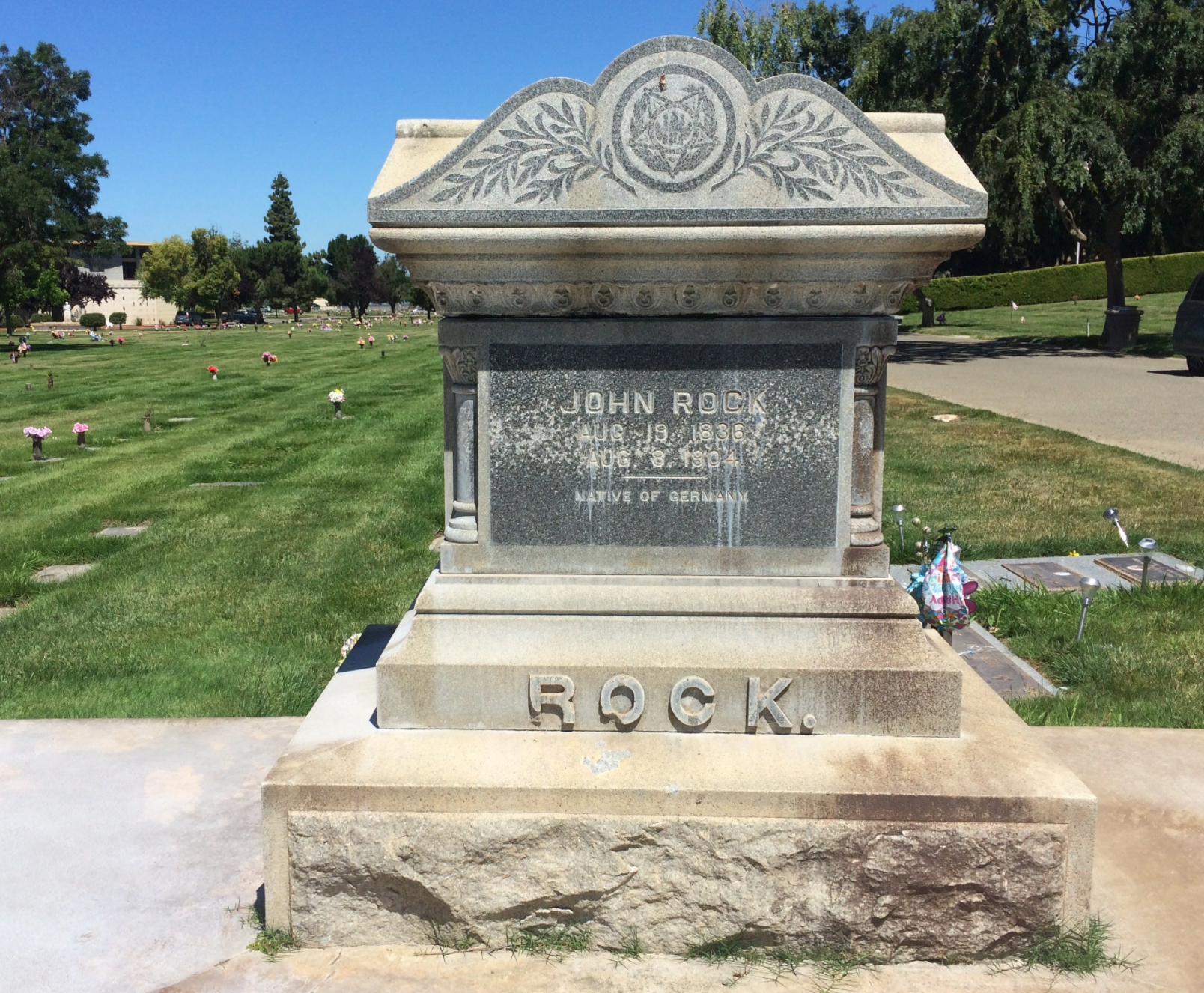
Gravesite and headstone of John Rock. Chapel of the Chimes in Hayward California. The star on Rock's grave is a G.A.R. star.

John Rock died in 1904. The San Jose Mercury News recognized him as one of 22 Civil War veterans in San Jose who had died in 1904. The 1904-1905 catalog announced his death: "Our beloved Manager has passed into the Great Unknown. A familiar name and figure has gone-- a man and friend of sterling qualities is no more; one in whose judgment and abilities vast numbers of people and even governments have securely rested in horticultural matters can advise no longer. We mourn his loss". Rock is buried about 3 miles north of the California Nursery Company at the Chapel of the Chimes.

The San Jose Daily Mercury wrote "In the death of John Rock the county of Santa Clara loses one of the pioneers in the development of the fruit industry in this section of the state. For the past twenty five years the name of John Rock has been a household word among those who were planting the orchards and developing the gardens of this and adjacent counties. In fact, the extensive nursery business which he developed from small beginnings has gained him a state wide reputation, until there is, probably, next to Luther Burbank, no name better known throughout California."

John Rock was remembered by E.J. Wickson, at the 1911-1912 Pacific Coast Association of Nurserymen: "He has gone to his reward, but his memory will always be honored by every nurseryman who ever knew him — Mr. John Rock, who began in this community in a small way and built up the nursery business and finally extended his interests into large commercial enterprises which I hope we shall visit while here. Mr. Rock has always stood to me as an example of what a nurseryman ought to be in his position as an educator to the community, because he possessed at the time when he was most active and energetic, a fuller and truer knowledge of the nursery business than any other man in California. He was a good student and possessed himself of all sources of information; he was a wonderful observer, had a keen eye for fruit or for a plant and, above all, had a sterling honesty and conscientiousness which led everyone who knew him to place implicit confidence in any statement which he might make, and you could trust Rock to give you facts, although it might not be immediately to his interest to do so. John Rock gave me a palm in 1879, a little palm in a pot, and I planted it in my garden in Berkeley, and that palm is today the most handsome and largest palm in the City of Berkeley — it must be 40 feet high and 30 feet across its branches. I see it every day that I am at home and never pass it without thinking that that palm stands as a monument to the life and service of John Rock in its community. It is stalwart, symmetrical and beautiful and sheds its beauty among all its environments; so Rock stood among the pioneer fruit growers and the more we know of his life and deeds the better we will be able to understand the possibilities of a nurseryman in the community."

Henry W. Kruckeberg wrote, "John Rock: a Tribute" in the proceedings of the 1912 California Association of Nurserymen. He did not know Rock personally but collected the remembrances from his living friends. "In more ways than one, the name of John Rock is destined to become historic in California horticultural development. He had, in a marked degree, the mind and temperament calculated to stimulate fruit growing along sane and intelligent lines. Value was ever uppermost in his mind; no fruit, tree or plant commended itself to him unless it possessed utility or beauty, or both. So pronounced was he in this respect, that he never adopted a new fruit without first testing it out on his experiment grounds. Intensely in love with his work, it is no wonder that he spent thousands of dollars in exploiting new and little known fruits and plants, many of which proved worthless; nor that, on the other hand, his untiring zeal in the development of California horticulture has been the direct means of introducing a larger number of varieties of fruits and plants into this State than any other one man. His well known continuity of purpose was as pronounced as his ambition was strong and robust. For upwards of forty years he was untiring in his efforts to stimulate, broaden and intensify the importance of California horticulture."

E.J. Wickson wrote about John Rock as one of the pioneers of California's nursery business, in California nurserymen and the plant industry, 1850-1910 "The nursery and pomological leader during the later '60s and thereafter for over a third of a century was John Rock, to whose memory a touching tribute by Mr. Kruckeberg was published in the report of the second annual meeting of the California Association of Nurserymen. Mr. Rock was more widely and deeply grounded in pomological knowledge than any of his contemporaries. To him came first the vision of the greatness of nursery enterprise of which California is capable and he lived to see his pioneer conception of such greatness attained not only in his own enterprise, but in the undertakings of the later generation. During his forty years of California life, his leadership in his chosen art and industry and the quality of his manhood and citizenship were unquestioned.'

== California Nursery Historical Park ==
After Rock's death, the California Nursery continued with W.V. Eberly as manager and was bought by George C. Roeding in 1917. It continued to be run by the Roeding family until the 1970s. The last 20 acres of the 463-acre nursery are a park in the Niles District of Fremont, California. The archives of Rock's Nurseries and the California Nursery Company are in several locations: at the California Nursery Historical Park, managed by the Math Science Nucleus, at the Fremont Main branch of the Alameda County Library, and at the Washington Township Museum of Local History.
