= Briceland, California =

Unincorporated community in California, United States

Briceland
- Unincorporated community
- Location in California
- Coordinates: 40°06′29″N 123°54′00″W
- Country: United States
- State: California
- County: Humboldt
- Elevation: 594 ft (181 m)

Briceland is an unincorporated community in Humboldt County, California, United States. It is 6 miles (10 km) west of Redway, at an elevation of 594 feet (181 m).

A post office operated at Briceland from 1889 to 1968. The name honors John C. Briceland, who purchased the site in 1889. The town once had a hotel, livery stable, and general store. These businesses were mostly destroyed by fire on July 14, 1914. The area now consists of scattered farms and residences.
