= Lior Etter =

Swiss football midfielder (born 1990)

Personal information
- Full name: Lior Bela Etter
- Date of birth: 21 January 1990 (age 36)
- Height: 1.81 m (5 ft 11 in)
- Position: Midfielder

Team information
- Current team: FC Lucerne
- Number: 33

Youth career
- 2005–2009: Fc Hitzkirch, Fc Hochdorf, Sc Kriens, FC Lucerne

Senior career*
Years	Team	Apps	(Gls)
2009–2010	FC Lucerne	6	(1)
- * Club domestic league appearances and goals as of 11 July 2008

Lior Bela Etter (born 21 January 1990) is a Swiss football midfielder who played for FC Lucerne in the Swiss Super League until 2010.
