= California Nursery Company =

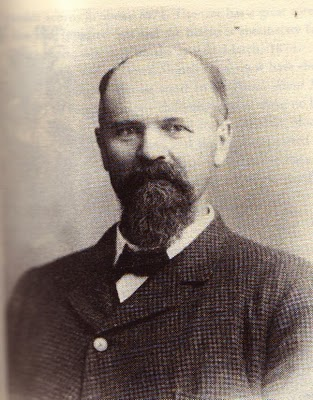
John Rock of San Jose and the California Nursery Company

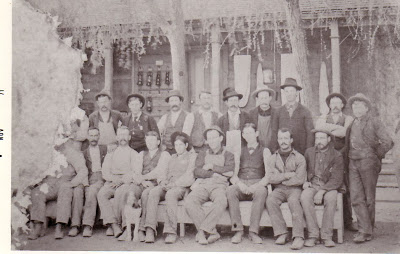
Workers at California Nursery Company, Niles, California, now a district in Fremont, California, 1890s. Another photo version

The California Nursery Company was established in Niles, California, and incorporated in 1884 by John Rock, R. D. Fox, and others. The nursery sold fruit trees, nut trees, ornamental shrubs and trees, and roses. It was responsible for introducing new hybrids created by such important West Coast breeders as Luther Burbank and Albert Etter.

== History ==
John Rock was born Johannes Rock in Germany, on August 19, 1838. He immigrated to the United States in 1852 and fought on the Union side in the Civil War before settling in California in 1863.

== "Rock's Nurseries" in San Jose ==
John Rock had three nursery locations in San Jose, California, on Coyote Creek. The catalog for "Rock's Nurseries" for 1885 says that John Rock had 19 years of experience in California, putting the date of establishment at around 1865. Rock's Nurseries continued on some time after the establishment of the California Nursery Company. The San Jose City Directory for 1887 has advertisements for both the "California Nursery Company" in Niles and "Rock's Nurseries" in San Jose. There was a "Rock's Nurseries" catalog for 1888. Andrew P. Hill took photos of Rock's Nurseries and the California Nursery Company in Niles.

The San Jose Weekly Mercury reported on Rock's Nurseries in 1883, about a year before the California Nursery Company was established in Niles.

== The California Nursery Company in Niles ==
In 1884, the California Nursery Company was established in Niles, California (now a district in Fremont). The December 6, 1884 Pacific Rural Press announced "Nursery Enterprise.--It seems to be the time for great things in the nursery business. It is now announced that John Rock, R. D. Fox, James Hutchison, Thomas Meherin and Wm. J. Landers have associated themselves together in a nursery enterprise. A tract of 500 acres of land near Niles, Alameda county, has been purchased and leased for 15 years to the association, and improvements will begin at once. It is expected to have trees ready for delivery in the fall of 1886. Messrs. Rock & Fox will continue to sell their present stock, and will propagate no more fruit trees on their San Jose establishments but will confine their attention to ornamental growths." The property was bought from Jonas Gilman Clark. An existing adobe building that was built around the 1830s-1840s predates the nursery and is on the National Register of Historic Place.

In 1886 the Pacific Rural Press reported on their progress after almost 2 years of operation. In 1888 the Pacific Rural Press wrote about "The Nursery Business" and included several etchings of the new nursery.

The year 1865 is often cited for the establishment of the California Nursery Company and has caused much confusion. Charles Burr, a longtime employee of the nursery said in 1970 that 1865 was "used as the beginning date of the California Nursery for purposes of anniversaries." The date of 1865 is the establishment of "Rock's Nurseries" in San Jose, not the California Nursery Company. Sometime around or before the 1906-1907 catalog, the words "Established 1865" were added to the front cover along with "Incorporated 1884" and it was carried forward. Another book that was used as "proof" that the California Nursery Company started in 1865 was Pen Pictures of the "Garden of the World." However, it clearly states that John Rock and partners established the California Nursery Company in 1884 in Niles. Catalogs for "Rock's Nurseries" in the Santa Clara Valley are available for the years 1873-1888 are available from UC Davis. Advertisements for both the California Nursery Company and Rock's Nurseries are printed in directories and newspapers at least up to 1887.

At first, the nursery was a wholesaler providing grape vines, roses, ornamentals, and fruit trees to California's growing agricultural industry. Early on it supplied plants for the Palo Alto estate of California tycoon Leland Stanford. Later, in addition to its wholesale business, the nursery started a retail operation with ornamental trees and plants for homes and gardens.

John Rock was interested in creating new plant hybrids and worked with West Coast plant breeders like Luther Burbank. His 1888 catalog featured some 500 varieties of fruit trees, 700 ornamental shrubs, and 270 roses. By the time Rock died, his nursery had introduced more new plant varieties to California than any other.

After Rock's death in 1904, the nursery was managed by W. V. Eberly. William J. Landers, insurance businessman, was associated with the nursery since its beginning. He was President at his death from "Nervous Prostration" in 1908, which he had suffered from since the 1906 fire in San Francisco.

In 1918, the company announced a new trademark, a logo with a grizzly bear. According to the family, the logo was discontinued because of a conflict with Stark Brothers logo. The nursery later embraced the "Old Adobe" logo after the historic Vallejo adobe was transformed into the nursery's Guest Lodge. One of the earliest appearances of the "Old Adobe" logo appears in the 1945 catalog.

== The California Nursery Company and World's Fairs ==
The California Nursery Company provided trees and other plants at many world's fairs. Some are:

- Centennial Exposition in Philadelphia, first US World's Fair - "Fruit for the Centennial" John Rock (Rock's Nurseries) sent pears and plums
- World's Columbian Exposition of 1893
- California Midwinter International Exposition of 1894
- Panama-Pacific International Exposition 1915
- Golden Gate International Exposition 1939-1940

== The California Nursery Company under the Roeding family ==
=== The Nursery under George C. Roeding ===
In 1917, the nursery was bought by George C. Roeding, owner of Fancher Creek in Fresno and other operations. In July 1918, stock shares were issued to George C. Roeding in exchange for real property. George C. Roeding brought with him a wealth of horticultural and nursery business experience.

=== The Nursery under George C. Roeding, Jr. ===
Roeding's son, George C. Roeding, Jr. took over management of the nurseries in 1926. George C. Roeding died in 1928. The Township Register noted in 1929 that 100 to 150 men worked for the nursery and that their annual turnover of stock exceeded $200,000.The nursery grew a half million roses. A foreign correspondent managed orders from Mexico, Central America, and South America. Other shipments went to China, Japan, India, Italy, Spain, Germany, Great Britain, Australia, Canada, France, Denmark, and Russia.

In 1940, the northern California plant breeder Albert Etter began a partnership with the CNC with the goal of patenting and then marketing Etter's best apple varieties. The CNC introduced six Etter varieties in its 1945 catalog, including Pink Pearl. A seventh variety was introduced later.

The CNC ultimately became the largest firm of its kind west of the Rockies. It was located close enough to the San Francisco Bay Area that it became a destination for gardeners and horticulturists.

From 1932 to the mid-1960s, the California Nursery hosted annual bulb shows in spring that could draw up to 5000 visitors over a weekend. Frances Baldwin Roeding, wife of George C. Roeding, Jr. helped plan the annual bulb shows. In the summer, the nursery held rose shows.

Articles by George C. Roeding, Jr.:

- "Planting for Homes Most Important" 21 April 1932
- "Rose Show to be Held at Niles Saturday and Sunday" 19 June 1932
- "Narcissus Bulbs Now Ready for Spring Gardens" 18 September 1932
- "New Crop of Roses are Ready for Eastbay Gardens" 4 December 1932
- "Jonquils and Daffodils Provide March Gardens" 19 March 1933

== Articles about the History of the California Nursery Company ==
Articles in the Tri-City Voice:

- "California Nursery Historical Park: Horticultural History" January 14, 2020
- "Fremont's Floral Treasure: The Display Gardens" January 28, 2020
- "Preserving History, the Environment, Wildlife February 11, 2020
- "An Historical Archive in the California Nursery Office" March 24, 2020
- "California Nursery: The Packing Shed" April 7, 2020
- "California Nursery: The Garden Store" May 5, 2020
- "California Nursery: Roeding Family House" May 19, 2020
- "California Nursery: The Boxed Oak Trees" June 23, 2020

Articles in journals relating to the California Nursery Company:

- "The California Nursery: A History" by Charles J. Burr 1970; Burr was a longtime employee of the nursery
- "Nursery Order for the Avenue of Palms" 2015; The nursery provided palms and other plants for the Panama-Pacific International Exposition.
- "The Reluctant Railway Gardener: Johannes Reimers and the Depot Landscapes of the Santa Fe Railroad" Winter 2018; Johannes Reimers designed the Old Adobe Garden at the California Nursery in Niles and worked with the Roeding family on various projects.
- "Albert Etter: Humboldt County's Horticultural Genius"
- "The California Nursery Company Archives: Far and Wide"

== California Nursery Historical Park ==
After 1972, some of the former nursery grounds were turned into a Fremont city park, the California Nursery Historic Park, although the family continued to lease out some land to other nurseries. The California Nursery Garden Club (under various names) has taken care of the gardens surrounding the nursery office since 1994, along with the City of Fremont and the Math / Science Nucleus

== See also ==
- Surprise (apple)

== Catalogs ==
Catalogs for the California Nursery Company and Fancher Creek Nurseries can be found in these collections:

- Henry G. Gilbert Nursery and Seed Trade Catalog Collection for USDA
- Mertz Digital Collections, New York Botanical Garden
- The Biodiversity Heritage Library
- The California Nursery Company - Roeding Collection in California Revealed
- The Internet Archive hosts many of these collections and has an Open Library interface.
