= Ettersburg, California =

- Locale
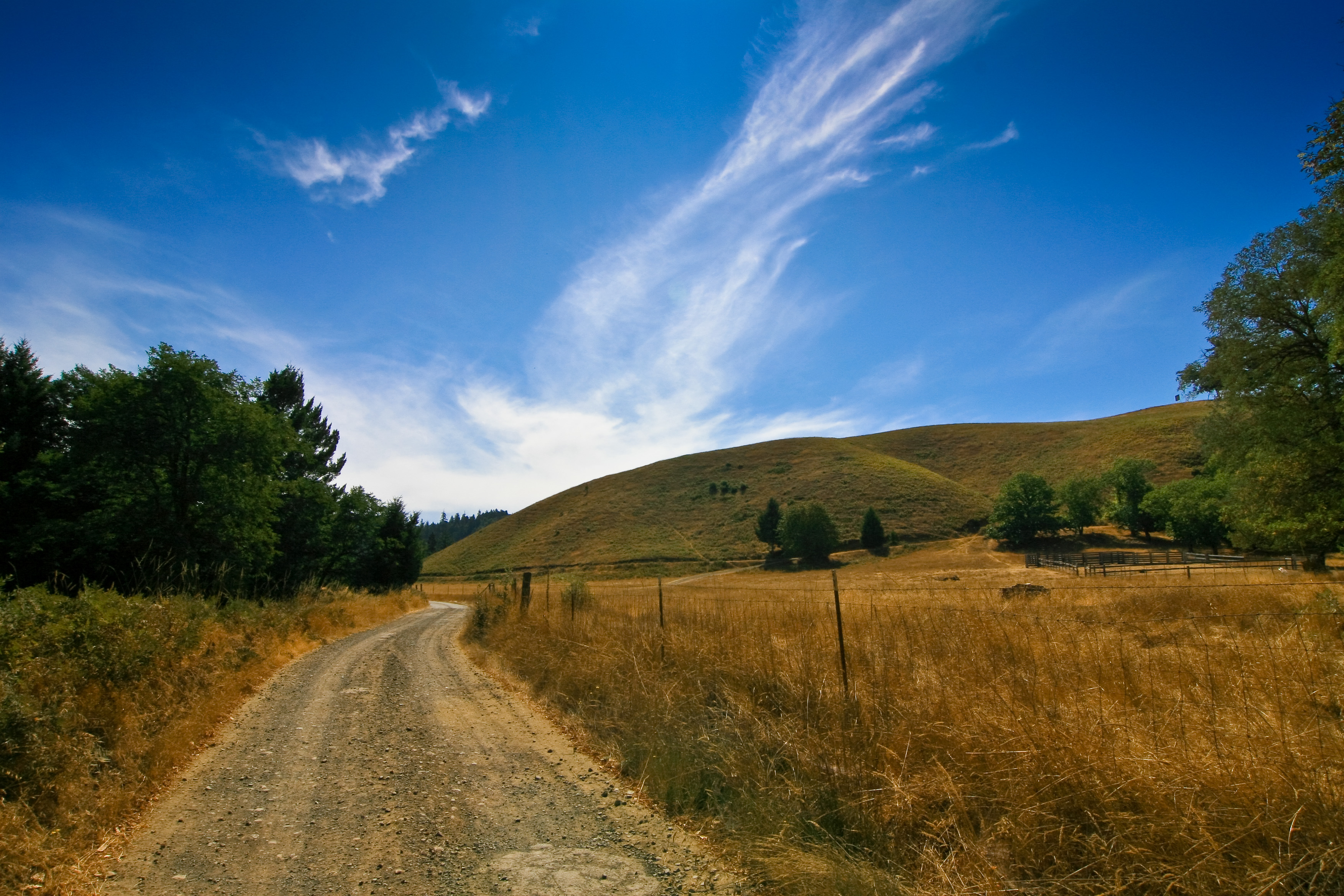

- Location in Humboldt County, California and the state of California

- Location in the United States
- Coordinates: 40°08′19″N 123°59′50″W
- Country: United States
- State: California
- County: Humboldt County
- Established: 40.136363, -123.996914
- Elevation: 669 ft (204 m)

Population (2010)
  - Total: 10
- Time zone: UTC-8 (Pacific (PST))
  - Summer (DST): UTC-7 (PDT)
- ZIP Code: 95542
- Area code: 707
- GNIS feature IDs: 1659640; 2611448

Ettersburg (also, Etter) is a locality in Humboldt County, California. It is located 12.5 miles (20 km) west-northwest of Phillipsville, at an elevation of 676 feet (206 m).

== History ==
A post office operated at Ettersburg from 1902 to 1906 and from 1915 to 1965. The settlement is named for its founder, horticulturist Albert Etter.

=== Development of Ettersburg ===
Albert's German-born mother, Wilhelmina (Kern) Etter (d. 1913) was skilled at cultivating plants, and Etter showed a talent for hybridizing plants in childhood, working with apples, peaches, dahlias, and strawberries by the time he was twelve. He attended public school and by the end of his teens was looking out for a site where he could continue his plant-breeding experiments. On a fishing trip to the Mattole River Valley, he found a section of land above Bear Creek and in 1894 he staked a claim to it. This area along the Pacific coast in the King Range has wet winters and hot summers, and Albert later attributed his success partly to his choice of location. The site where Albert developed his ranch was subsequently named after him, first as Etter and then as Ettersburg.

Etter managed the ranch with three of his brothers, George, Fred, and August; and another four of his siblings also lived nearby. While Etter focused on plant breeding, his brothers oversaw other kinds of farming and stockkeeping operations. The ranch holdings, operated under the business name Etter Brothers, eventually reached 800 acres in size. Although the Etter Brothers firm and the Ettersburg Experimental Place became internationally known among plant breeders, and Etter renowned as "the Luther Burbank of Humboldt County", they never made more than a modest living from the land. For one thing, they were far removed from the main trucking and rail routes, and for another, new plant hybrids were not protected by the patent system until 1930.

== Geography ==
Ettersburg is located 12.5 miles (20 km) west-northwest of Phillipsville, at an elevation of 676 feet (206 m). Nearby cities are: Shelter Cove (8.4 miles south-southwest), Redway (9.3 miles east), Garberville (11 miles east/southeast) Benbow, (12.2 miles ESE), Weott (13.3 miles NNE), Redcrest (18.3 miles N), Alderpoint (20.6 miles E).

The town is on the banks of the Mattole River. According to the USGS, the Mattole River's drainage area upstream of Ettersburg is 70.9 sq mi (184 km^{2}).

Ettersburg is in the Lost Coast region which includes Pacific Ocean coast, and several rivers. The location of Ettersburg on U.S. 101 is 241 miles (388 km) northwest of Sacramento and 300 mi (480 km) north of San Francisco. The next big city is Eureka, principal city and county seat of Humboldt County.

The city is only 15 miles (24 km) away with access the coast and increases in elevation slightly as it spreads north, south, and especially to the east.

The city then gives way to hills and mountains of the rugged coast range, which quickly exceed 3,200 ft (980 m) in elevation.

== Climate ==
Ettersburg experiences mild to warm (but not hot) and dry summers with some rainy days, with not many average monthly temperatures above 70 °F (21 °C). According to the Köppen Climate Classification system, Ettersburg has a warm-summer Mediterranean climate, abbreviated "Csc" on climate maps. There are cool winters during which intense rainfall occurs. It has warm, dry summers with moderate rainfall through the summer months. Snow in Ettersburg is very rare, occurring every 20 to 30 years in winter months. Average January temperatures are a maximum of 54.0 °F (12.2 °C) and a minimum of 41.0 °F (5.0 °C). Average August temperatures are a maximum of 62.0 °F (16.7 °C) and a minimum of 53.0 °F (11.7 °C). The record high temperature was 86 °F (30 °C). The record low temperature was 21 °F (−6 °C). Average annual precipitation is 37.9 inches (960 mm). There are on average 120 days with measurable precipitation which makes Ettersburg a Mediterranean climate.

Ettersburg's Köppen classification and climate is similar to locations such as parts of Balmaceda, Chile, in high elevations of Corsica, Haleakala Summit in Hawaii and the Cascades or Sierra-Nevada-ranges.

Climate data for Ettersburg, California
| Month | Jan | Feb | Mar | Apr | May | Jun | Jul | Aug | Sep | Oct | Nov | Dec | Year |
|---|---|---|---|---|---|---|---|---|---|---|---|---|---|
| Record high °F (°C) | 78.0 (25.6) | 80.0 (26.7) | 76.0 (24.4) | 80.0 (26.7) | 82.0 (27.8) | 85.0 (29.4) | 76.0 (24.4) | 82.0 (27.8) | 86.0 (30.0) | 84.0 (28.9) | 78.0 (25.6) | 77.0 (25.0) | 86.0 (30.0) |
| Mean daily maximum °F (°C) | 54.0 (12.2) | 55.0 (12.8) | 55.0 (12.8) | 56.0 (13.3) | 58.0 (14.4) | 60.0 (15.6) | 61.0 (16.1) | 62.0 (16.7) | 62.0 (16.7) | 61.0 (16.1) | 58.0 (14.4) | 55.0 (12.8) | 58.1 (14.5) |
| Daily mean °F (°C) | 48.0 (8.9) | 49.0 (9.4) | 49.0 (9.4) | 50.0 (10.0) | 53.0 (11.7) | 56.0 (13.3) | 57.0 (13.9) | 58.0 (14.4) | 57.0 (13.9) | 55.0 (12.8) | 52.0 (11.1) | 49.0 (9.4) | 52.8 (11.5) |
| Mean daily minimum °F (°C) | 41.0 (5.0) | 43.0 (6.1) | 43.0 (6.1) | 45.0 (7.2) | 48.0 (8.9) | 51.0 (10.6) | 52.0 (11.1) | 53.0 (11.7) | 51.0 (10.6) | 49.0 (9.4) | 45.0 (7.2) | 42.0 (5.6) | 46.9 (8.3) |
| Record low °F (°C) | 26.0 (−3.3) | 27.0 (−2.8) | 30.0 (−1.1) | 34.0 (1.1) | 36.0 (2.2) | 41.0 (5.0) | 46.0 (7.8) | 46.0 (7.8) | 41.0 (5.0) | 32.0 (0.0) | 30.0 (−1.1) | 21.0 (−6.1) | 21.0 (−6.1) |
| Average precipitation inches (mm) | 6.2 (160) | 5.0 (130) | 5.2 (130) | 2.8 (71) | 1.8 (46) | 0.6 (15) | 0.2 (5.1) | 0.3 (7.6) | 0.8 (20) | 2.9 (74) | 5.8 (150) | 6.3 (160) | 37.9 (968.7) |
| Average precipitation days | 15 | 14 | 16 | 12 | 8 | 6 | 2 | 3 | 5 | 9 | 14 | 16 | 120 |
| Mean monthly sunshine hours | 156.2 | 152.4 | 200.8 | 270.7 | 322.3 | 339.4 | 367.2 | 365.6 | 312.2 | 206.1 | 177.8 | 151.9 | 3,022.6 |
| Mean daily sunshine hours | 5.0 | 5.4 | 6.5 | 9.0 | 10.4 | 11.3 | 11.9 | 11.9 | 10.4 | 6.7 | 5.9 | 4.9 | 8.3 |
| Average ultraviolet index | 3 | 2 | 3 | 4 | 4 | 5 | 5 | 5 | 5 | 4 | 3 | 3 | 4 |
Source 1: SUN, UV INDEX under worldweatheronline
Source 2: EXTREMES, humidity, dew point under myforecast.co and Source 3: EXTREMES, humidity, dew point under myforecast.co

== Education ==
Ettersburg once had an Elementary school from 1980 to 2012 serving 3 Grades. The next school district is either in Shelter Cove, Whitethorn or in Garberville.
