= Pioneer Cemetery (Nevada City, California) =

Cemetery in Nevada County, California

Details
- Established: c. 1851
- Location: West Broad Street, Nevada City, Nevada County, California
- Country: United States
- Coordinates: 39.26556°N 121.02417°W
- Type: Church
- Find a Grave: Pioneer Cemetery
- The Political Graveyard: Pioneer Cemetery

The Pioneer Cemetery is a cemetery established in c. 1851 behind the Nevada City United Methodist Church, in Nevada City, California. This was the first cemetery in Nevada City, formed during the California Gold Rush.

== History ==
The Pioneer Cemetery was established in 1851 on a hill behind the Nevada City United Methodist Church. The Nevada City United Methodist Church was the first denominational church in Nevada County. Some sources cite the cemetery establishment date as 1849; this was the first cemetery in Nevada City. Many of the early grave markers were made of wood and no longer existing due to time and decay. It is estimated there are 400 unmarked graves at Pioneer Cemetery.

One of the notable burials is Henry Meredith (1826–1860) who was killed at the Battle of Lake Pyramid in Utah Territory (now Nixon, Nevada); his burial drew crowds to the cemetery. Aaron Augustus Sargent (1827–1887), politician nicknamed, "the Senator for the Southern Pacific Railroad", has a grave marker at this cemetery.

Other historic cemeteries in Nevada City include: the North Bloomfield Cemetery in the Malakoff Diggins State Historic Park; the Moores Flat cemetery in Moores Flat, a former mining site; the St. Canice Historical Cemetery; the Pine Grove Cemetery; and the Meadow Lake cemetery in the mining town of Meadow Lake.

== List of notable burials ==
- Henry Meredith (1826–1860) killed at the Battle of Lake Pyramid in Utah Territory (now Nixon, Nevada)
- Aaron Augustus Sargent (1827–1887) journalist, lawyer, politician and diplomat
- Stephen Venard (c. 1823–1891) lawman, and renowned road agent killer in Northern California

== See also ==
- List of cemeteries in California
- Nevada City Downtown Historic District
- Pioneer cemetery
