= Ilex nervulosa =

Conservation status
- Least Concern (IUCN 3.1)

Scientific classification
- Kingdom: Plantae
- Clade: Tracheophytes
- Clade: Angiosperms
- Clade: Eudicots
- Clade: Asterids
- Order: Aquifoliales
- Family: Aquifoliaceae
- Genus: Ilex
- Species: I. nervulosa

Binomial name
- Ilex nervulosa (Loes.) S.Andrews

Synonyms
- Ilex venulosa var. nervulosa Loes.

Species of tree in the holly family

Ilex nervulosa is a species of flowering plant in the family Aquifoliaceae. This tree is native to Southeast Asia. The specific epithet nervulosa means 'finely veined', referring to the leaves.

== Description ==
Ilex nervulosa grows up to 38 metres (125 ft) tall. The bark is corky. The leathery leaves are elliptic to oblong and measure up to 15 cm (6 in) long. The inflorescences, in cymes, feature greenish-white flowers. The round fruits are red.

== Distribution and habitat ==
Ilex nervulosa is native to Peninsular Malaysia, Singapore, Sumatra and Borneo. Its habitat is in kerangas as well as in swamp and beach forests, at elevations to 850 m (2,800 ft).
