= Ilex kelabitana =

Conservation status
- Data Deficient (IUCN 3.1)

Scientific classification
- Kingdom: Plantae
- Clade: Tracheophytes
- Clade: Angiosperms
- Clade: Eudicots
- Clade: Asterids
- Order: Aquifoliales
- Family: Aquifoliaceae
- Genus: Ilex
- Species: I. kelabitana

Binomial name
- Ilex kelabitana S.Andrews

Species of tree in the holly family

Ilex kelabitana is a tree in the family Aquifoliaceae, native to Borneo. It is named for the Kelabit Highlands of Sarawak.

== Description ==
Ilex kelabitana grows up to 7 metres (23 ft) tall. The leathery leaves are elliptic or oblong and measure up to 14.5 cm (6 in) long. The inflorescences, in cymes, feature white flowers.

== Distribution and habitat ==
Ilex kelabitana is endemic to Borneo, where it is recorded from Sarawak and Kalimantan. Its habitat is in kerangas forests, at elevations to around 1,300 m (4,300 ft).
