= Charles Downing (pomologist) =

American pomologist, horticulturist, and author

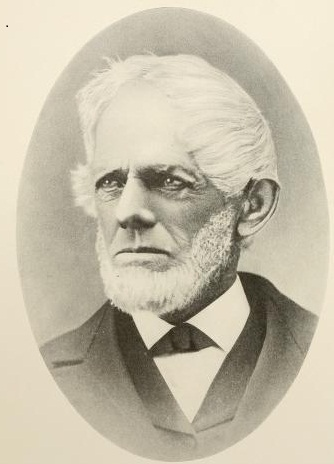
- Born: July 9, 1802; Newburgh, New York, U.S.
- Died: January 18, 1885 (aged 82)
- Occupations: Horticulturalist, pomologist, writer
- Spouse: Mary Wait

Charles Downing (July 9, 1802 – January 18, 1885) was an American pomologist, horticulturist, and writer.

== Biography ==
Charles Downing was born in Newburgh, New York, on July 9, 1802.

He began helping his father, Samuel Downing, with his nursery business when he was a teen. In 1822, his father died and Downing took over the business, later partnering with his brother, Andrew Jackson Downing, in 1835. The partnership lasted until 1839 when Charles sold his interest to start his own business.

As a nurseryman, Downing was known for his cultivation skill and trustworthiness.

Published in 1845, he worked with his brother to write The Fruits and Fruit Trees of America. After Andrew's death in 1852, Downing edited and added new material and reissued The Fruits and Fruit Trees of America. Each new edition greatly enlarged the book and it was the best publication of the kind in the United States.

In 1850, he left his nursery and began to research and experiment with fruit varieties. His test orchard contained 1,800 varieties of apples and 1,000 varieties of pears. He also worked with cultivating a variety of grapes in New York state.

He was regarded as one of the foremost pomologists of his day. His work throughout was conscientious and accurate, and he was recognized as an authority upon pomology, horticulture, and tree growths.

In 1870, Downing traveled with Marshall P. Wilder, Patrick Barry, and George Ellwanger to California and published about their journey in Tilton's Journal. The California Farmer and Journal of Useful Sciences printed their report in seven articles.

Their report transformed the horticultural landscape through the realization of the optimal growing conditions, vast acreage, large fruits, and exotic plants of California.

== Death and legacy ==
While in New York City in 1883, Downing was knocked down and run over by a horsecar. He never completely recovered from the injuries he received and died two years later on January 18, 1885.

He was married to Mary Wait, daughter of Samuel Wait of Montgomery, New York.

Downing bequeathed his library of books and manuscripts to the Iowa Agricultural College Horticulture Department. His drawings and descriptions of apples and other fruits became a major source for the fruit sections of the 1903 American Horticultural Manual.
