= Pomology =

Study of fruits and their cultivation

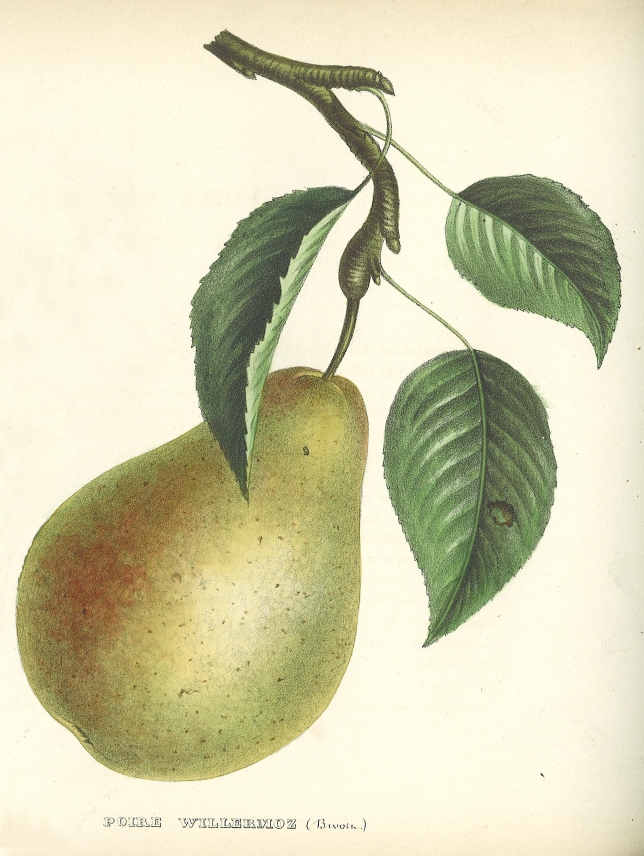
Illustration of the 'Willermoz' pear by Alexandre Bivort from Album de Pomologie (1848–1852)

Pomology (from Latin pomum, "fruit", + -logy, "study") is a branch of botany that studies fruits and their cultivation. Someone who researches and practices the science of pomology is called a pomologist.

Pomological research is mainly focused on the development, enhancement, cultivation, conservation and physiological studies of fruit trees. The goals of fruit tree improvement include enhancement of fruit quality, regulation of production periods, and reduction of production costs.

The term fruticulture (from Latin fructus, "fruit", + cultura, "care") is also used to describe the agricultural practice of growing fruits in orchards. It is applied horticulture of growing, managing, and producing fruit crops.

It focuses on:

- Orchard establishment and layout
- Pruning, training, and canopy management
- Irrigation and fertilization
- Pest and disease control
- Harvesting and orchard management practices

== Pomology ==
Pomology is a scientific discipline within horticulture that studies fruit and nut crops, and is often laboratory and research-oriented.

It focuses on:

- Fruit biology and physiology
- Genetics and breeding
- Flowering and fruiting processes
- Post-harvest physiology
- Fruit quality and storage
- Research aimed at improving yield, pest resistance, and fruit quality.

Systematic pomology is a branch with in pomology that focuses on the description, nomenclature (naming), and classification of fruit plants.

== History ==
=== Middle East ===
In ancient Mesopotamia, pomology was practiced by the Sumerians, who are known to have grown various types of fruit, including dates, grapes, apples, melons, and figs. While the first fruits cultivated by the Egyptians were likely indigenous, such as the palm date and sorghum, more fruits were introduced as other cultural influences were introduced. Grapes and watermelon were found throughout predynastic Egyptian sites, as were the sycamore fig, dom palm, and Christ's thorn. The carob, olive, apple, and pomegranate were introduced to Egyptians during the New Kingdom. Later, during the Greco-Roman period peaches and pears were also introduced.

=== Europe ===
The ancient Greeks and Romans also had a healthy tradition of pomology, and they cultivated a wide range of fruits, including apples, pears, figs, grapes, quinces, citron, strawberries, blackberries, elderberries, currants, damson plums, dates, melons, rose hips, and pomegranates. Less common fruits were the more exotic azeroles and medlars. Cherries and apricots, both introduced in the 1st century BC, were popular. Peaches were introduced in the 1st century AD from Persia. Oranges and lemons were known but used more for medicinal purposes than in cookery. The Romans, in particular, were known for their advanced methods of fruit cultivation and storage, and they developed many of the approaches that are still used in modern pomology.

=== United States ===
During the mid-19th century in the United States, farmers were expanding fruit orchard programs in response to growing markets. At the same time, horticulturists from the USDA and agricultural colleges were bringing new varieties to the US from foreign expeditions, and developing experimental lots for these fruits. In response to this increased interest and activity, the USDA established the Division of Pomology in 1886 and named Henry E. Van Deman as chief pomologist. An important focus of the division was to publish illustrated accounts of new varieties and to disseminate research findings to fruit growers and breeders through special publications and annual reports. During this period Andrew Jackson Downing and his brother Charles were prominent in pomology and horticulture, producing The Fruits and Fruit Trees of America (1845).

The introduction of new varieties required an exact portrait of the fruit so that plant breeders could accurately document and disseminate their research results. Since photography was not widespread in the late 19th century, the USDA commissioned artists to create watercolor illustrations of newly introduced cultivars. Many of the watercolors were used for lithographic reproductions in USDA publications, such as the Report of the Pomologist and the Yearbook of Agriculture. Today, the collection of approximately 7,700 watercolors is preserved in the National Agricultural Library's Special Collections, where it serves as a major historic and botanic resource to a variety of researchers, including horticulturists, historians, artists, and publishers.

== See also ==
- Arboriculture
- Floriculture
- Horticulture
- Olericulture
- Trophort
- Viticulture
