= Olericulture =

Study of cultivation of vegetables

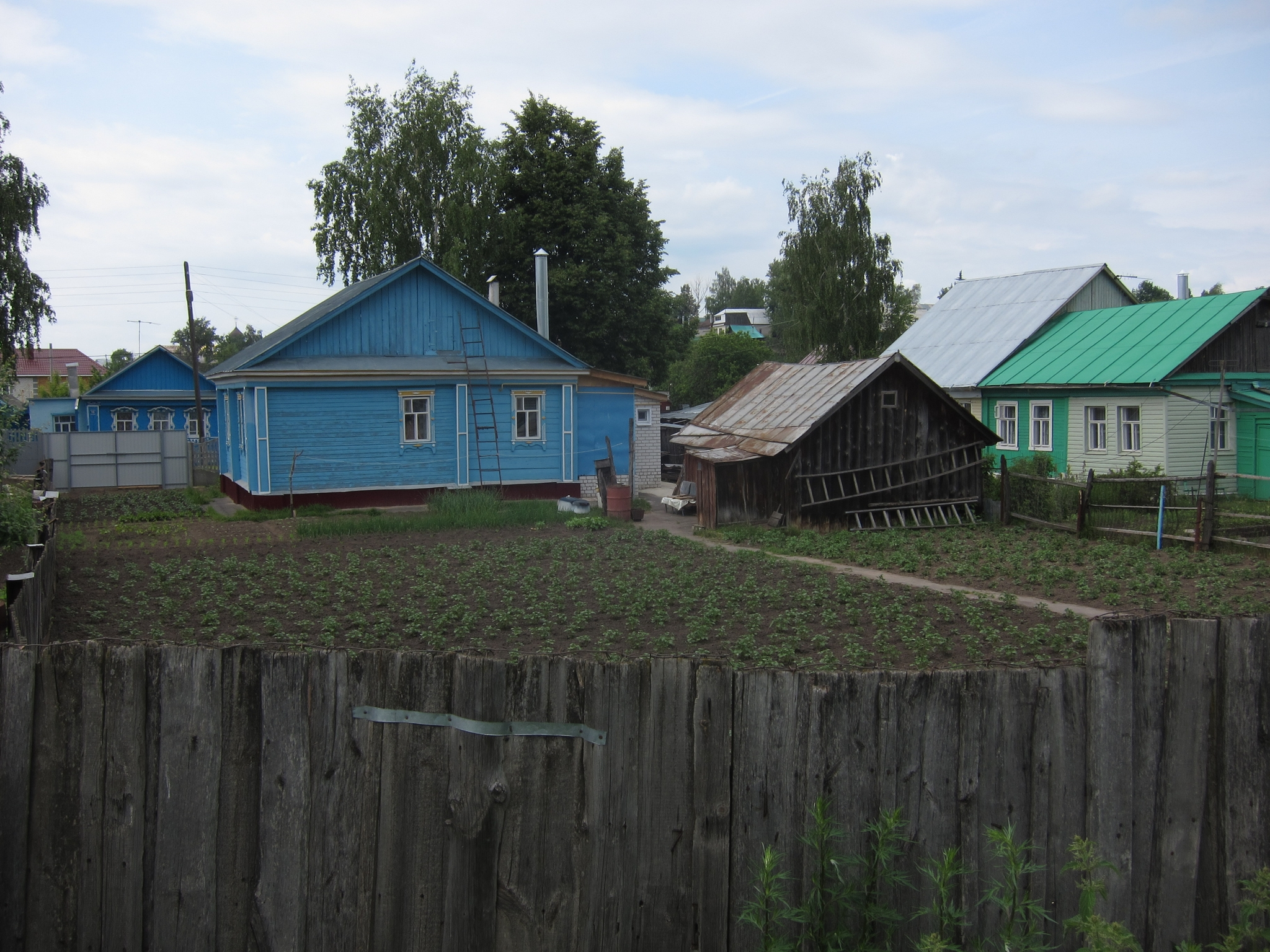
Olericulture - panoramio

Olericulture (from Latin: oleris + culture) is the science of vegetable growing, dealing with the culture of non-woody (herbaceous) plants for food.

Olericulture is the production of plants for use of the edible parts. Vegetable crops can be classified into nine major categories:

- Potherbs and greens – spinach and collards
- Salad crops – lettuce, celery
- Cole crops – cabbage and cauliflower
- Root crops (tubers) – potatoes, beets, carrots, radishes
- Bulb crops – onions, leeks
- Legumes – beans, peas
- Cucurbits – melons, squash, cucumber
- Solanaceous crops – tomatoes, peppers, potatoes
- Sweet corn

Olericulture deals with the production, storage, processing and marketing of vegetables. It encompasses crop establishment, including cultivar selection, seedbed preparation and establishment of vegetable crops by seed and transplants.

It also includes maintenance and care of vegetable crops as well commercial and non-traditional vegetable crop production including organic gardening and organic farming; sustainable agriculture and horticulture; hydroponics; and biotechnology.

== See also ==
- Agriculture – the cultivation of animals, plants, fungi and other life forms for food, fiber, and other products used to sustain life.
- Horticulture – the industry and science of plant cultivation including the process of preparing soil for the planting of seeds, tubers, or cuttings.
- Pomology – a branch of botany that studies and cultivates pome fruit, and sometimes applied more broadly, to the cultivation of any type of fruit.
- Tropical horticulture – a branch of horticulture that studies and cultivates garden plants in the tropics, i.e., the equatorial regions of the world.
