= Journal of Horticultural Sciences =

- Discipline: Horticulture
- Language: English
- Edited by: Rajiv Kumar

Publication details
- History: 2006–present
- Publisher: Society for Promotion of Horticulture (India)
- Frequency: Biannual
- Open access: Yes
- License: CC BY-NC-SA 4.0
- Impact factor: 0.4 (2024)

Standard abbreviations
- ISO 4: J. Hortic. Sci.

Indexing
- CODEN: JHSOFF
- ISSN: 0973-354X (print); 2582-4899 (web)
- OCLC no.: 804925224

Links
- Journal homepage; Online access; Online archive

The Journal of Horticultural Sciences is a biannual peer-reviewed open-access scientific journal covering all branches of horticulture. It was established in 2006 and is published by the Society for Promotion of Horticulture. The journal contains review articles, research papers, and short communications. The editor-in-chief is Rajiv Kumar (ICAR-Indian Institute of Horticultural Research).

== Abstracting and indexing ==
The journal is abstracted and indexed in:

- Biological Abstracts
- BIOSIS Previews
- CAB Abstracts
- Directory of Open Access Journals
- Emerging Sources Citation Index
- Food Science and Technology Abstracts
- Scopus

According to the Journal Citation Reports, the journal has a 2024 impact factor of 0.4.
