= Tropical horticulture =

Branch of horticulture

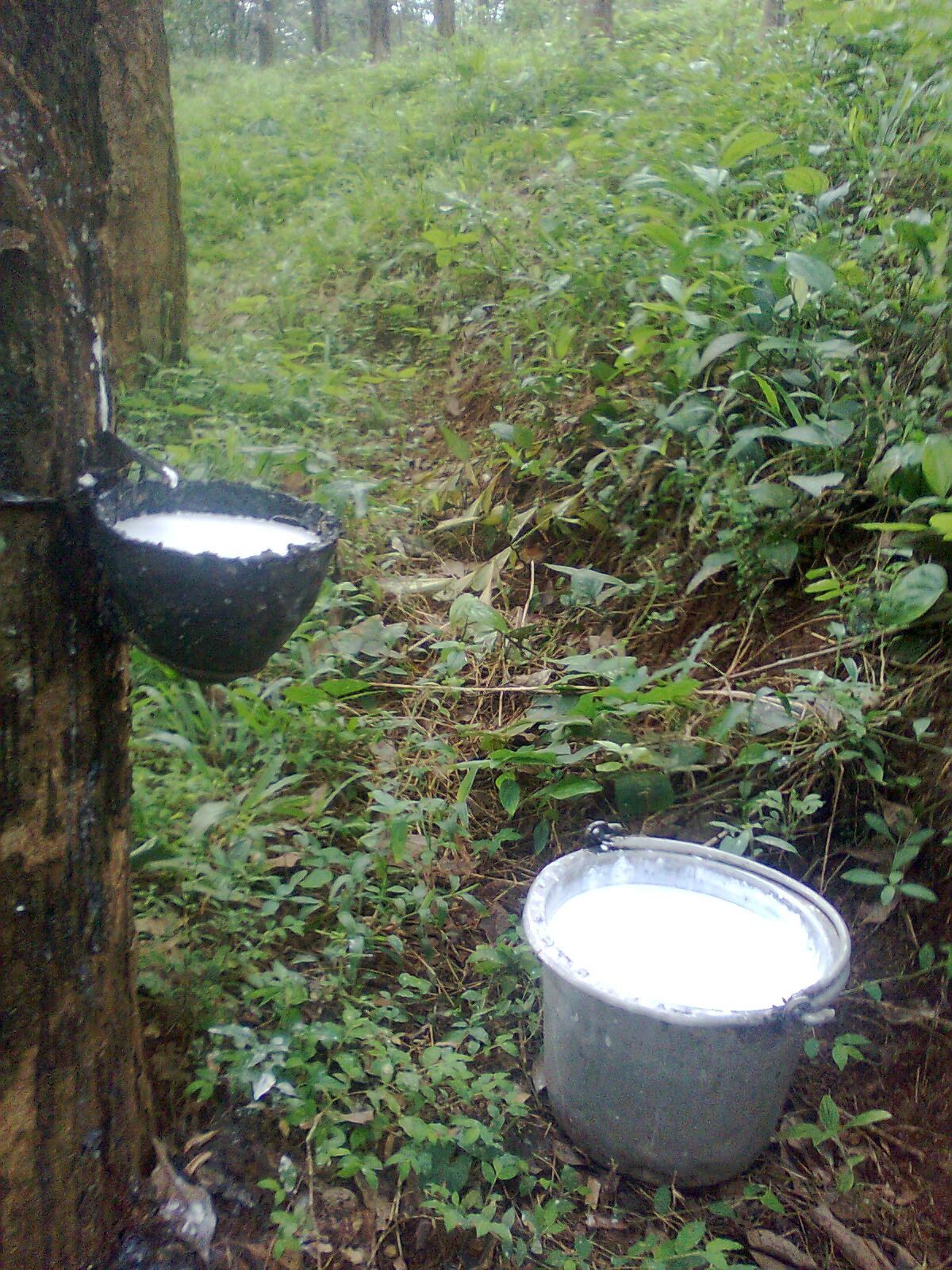
Latex being collected from an incised rubber tree (Hevea brasiliensis), and a bucket of collected latex

Tropical horticulture is a branch of horticulture that studies and cultivates plants in the tropics, i.e., the equatorial regions of the world. The field is sometimes known by the portmanteau "TropHort".

== Overview ==
Tropical horticulture includes plants such as perennial woody plants (arboriculture), ornamentals (floriculture), vegetables (olericulture), and fruits (pomology) including grapes (viticulture). The origin of many of these crops is not in the tropics but in temperate zones. Their adoption to tropical climatic conditions is an objective of breeding. Many important crops, however, are indigenous to the tropics. The latter embrace perennial crops such as oil palm, vegetables including okra, field crops such as rice and sugarcane, and particularly fruits including pineapple, banana, papaya, and mango.

Since the tropics represent 36 percent of the Earth's surface and 20 percent of its land surface, the potential of tropical horticulture is huge. In contrast to temperate regions, environmental conditions in the tropics are defined less by seasonal temperature fluctuations and more by seasonality of precipitation. Thus the climate in the greater part of the tropics is characterized by distinct wet and dry seasons, although such variation is reduced in locations closer to the equator (±5° latitude). Temperature conditions in the tropics are affected by elevation, in which contrasting warmer and colder climate areas in the tropics can be differentiated, and highland areas in the tropics can consequently be more favourable for production of temperate plant species than are lowland areas.

== Types of plants ==
Both vascular and non-vascular plants grow in tropical environments. Plants indigenous to the tropics are usually cold sensitive and adapted to receiving high levels of solar radiation. They are sensitive to small variations in photoperiod ("short day" plants), and can be adapted to extended drought, high precipitation and/or distinct wet and dry seasons. High night temperatures are a major hindrance to adopting temperate crops (e.g., tomatoes) to the tropical lowlands. Furthermore, such conditions promote high respiration rates of plants, resulting in comparably lower net photosynthesis rates.

== See also ==
- Arboriculture
- Floriculture
- Horticultural flora
- Horticulture
- Olericulture
- Pomology
- Tropical garden
- Tropical rainforest
- Viticulture
