= National Junior Horticultural Association =

The National Junior Horticultural Association (NJHA) is a non-profit organization in the United States that was founded in 1934 to promote and develop horticulture among youth. The organization hosts a variety of horticulturally related tours, activities, and competitions organized at annual national conventions held each fall. These competitions also serve as the national level for finalists from horticulture competitions held by 4-H, FFA, The Grange, and similar organizations at state or local levels. Preparations for these competitions help train youth in areas such as speech, presentation, and horticultural knowledge, but also, it is hoped, builds in them a greater appreciation for horticulture. Additionally, the organization aims to enrich education and to guide youth to pursue a career in horticulture.

== NJHA Goals ==
1. To promote and sponsor educational programs for youth through a variety of projects and activities that foster a better understanding of horticulture.
2. To develop good citizens with a basic understanding of nature and an acceptance of responsibility for the environment in which we live.
3. To acquaint youth with the many and varied career opportunities, both vocational and professional, available in the horticultural industry.
4. To provide young people and their adult leaders with new experiences in group participation, cooperation and leadership at the national level.

== Leadership ==
The Board of Trustees of the National Junior Horticultural Foundation, Inc. (NJHF) is the adult-based side of the National Junior Horticultural Association. Those who might be on the foundation board are representatives of horticulturally related corporations and associations, land-grant universities, the Cooperative Extension Service, FFA, youth officers, and anybody who privately donates $500 toward the organization.

The Foundation board nominates various NJHA alumni leaders to coordinate NJHA programs—national program chairperson, national vice program chairperson, adult advisor(s), and executive secretary. The program chairperson appoints national project leaders, and state program leaders. Youth officers must first be interviewed by the adult advisor(s), NJHA past president, NJHA current president, and the executive secretary (the nominating committee). The youth officers are nominated by that committee and are presented to the youth attending the convention. Youth officers are then elected at the NJHA annual convention from youth delegates their term is until the next year’s convention.

The 2024-2025 National Junior Horticultural Board

- Board Chairman: Brian Stark
- Vice Chair: Sue Beebe
- Board Secretary: Cliff Stukenholtz
- Treasurer: David Shortall
- National Program Chair: Michael Rethwisch

Board Members at Large Michael Bomberger (2023-2026) Eileen Boyle (2023-2026) Travis Olinske (2023-2026) Mary Stark (2023-2026) Brian Stark (2023-2026) Sue Beebe (2022-2025) Ted Beebe (2022-2025) Faith Beebe (2022-2025) Cliff Stukenholtz (2024-2027) Bill Wilder (2022-2025) Grace Manzer Atkins (2024-2027) Connie King (2022-2025) Susan Sprout Knight (2024-2027) Open (2024-2027) David Shortall (2024-2027) Elizabeth Exstrom (2024-2027)

The youth officer team consist of regional directors, secretary, vice president, and president. The past president is the only officer who is not elected as they were elected to a two-year term when elected president. Youth coordinators are appointed by state leaders from their state's delegates attending the convention. Youth coordinators act as ties between delegates and the national officer team and finding new youth and possible adult leaders.

The 2024-2025 National Junior Horticultural Association officer team

- President: Lane Taylor
- Vice President: Justin Austin
- Secretary: Ava Jacobs
- Director: Kira Anderson
- Director: Jeremiah Caswell
- Director: Kylie Goodson
- Director: Andrew Logan

Youth Advisor Susan Sprout Knight

The National Junior Horticultural Alumni Association is composed of a president, vice president, secretary, and treasurer. The officers are elected yearly and must be active in the alumni.

The 2024-2025 National Junior Horticultural Alumni Association officer team

- President: Michael Bomberger
- Vice President: Susan Sprout Knight
- Secretary: Angie Darsney
- Treasurer: Mary Stark

== NJHA Organization and Philosophy ==
The NJHA program focus is represented by the acronym HYCEL:

- H - Horticulture
- Y - Youth
- C - Careers
- E - Education
- L - Leadership

NJHA projects and activities are designed to work with:

- Existing programs, such as 4-H, FFA, scouts, vocational horticulture, the Grange and youth gardening groups.
- Any independent youth who wish to participate directly in NJHA. With the only exception is that any 4H participant may only come to NJHA directly though 4H once for the Horticulture Contest. They may come to NJHA their first time to represent their 4H team, but if they wish to return they may as an independent NJHA alumni who came originally with 4H. The speeches, demonstrations, project reports, etc. contests, provide opportunities for youth to try out their abilities and learn at the national level. When participating in the contests it is strongly encouraged that each youth practice their knowledge of horticulture though science and fact, as each participant is given points based on the horticulture science.

== Sources ==
"NJHA: the National Junior Horticultural Association" accessed on September 20, 2006

"What is The National Junior Horticultural Association (NJHA)?" accessed on September 20, 2006
