= Indigenous horticulture =

Horticulture practice

Indigenous horticulture is practised in various ways across all inhabited continents. Indigenous refers to the native peoples of a given area and horticulture is the practice of small-scale intercropping.

== Africa ==
=== North Africa ===
In North Africa, one such example is the farming practices of the Eggon, a Nigerian hill farming community. The Eggon live in the Mada hills, between Lafia and Akwanga. The hills lay between two rivers, the Mada and Arikya. The altitude helps crops retain moisture on the hills, due to early morning mists and fogs; this also makes for earlier and longer crop cultivation. They practice bush fallow agriculture as well as mixed farming land management styles. They focus on growing yams, cassava, maize, beans, and African rice; much of what is produced is exported as a cash crop and is their secondary source of cash income. The Eggon use a terraced agricultural system to maximize space on the hills. The goats they raise are kept mostly for fertilizers used in farming. They are only killed on special occasions, such as weddings. The Eggon use the diversity in their environment to maximize their crop production.

=== West Africa ===
In West Africa, the Kissidougou live on the savannah, dotted by dense areas of "forest islands" created by them. The Kissidougou practice intercropping within the forested areas. However, they also operate farms maintained on slopes or plateaus located between the forest islands. They prepare the savannah lands for forestation through farming and burning of the grasses to fertilize the soils. The Kissidougou graze their cattle on the savannah to help to maintain flammable grasses around the farms and the villages. The Kissidougou create diversity in their environment by farming and transforming savannah into lush, dense forest.

The prevalence of wetlands in West Africa has helped to support local indigenous horticulture. Seasonal flooding of major rivers in the region, such as the Niger, the Sudd, and the Senegal, have made it possible for flood-cropping in many areas. Indigenous people have utilized a variety of irrigation techniques in order to take advantage of this flooding. Additionally, they plan their plantings and harvests specifically around the flooding of local rivers. For example, some farmers choose to plant on rising floods and harvest as the flooding diminishes. This techniques is utilized when cultivating rice.

=== East Africa ===
East Africa is one of the areas most affected by corporate farming. In western Uganda, there is a farming society called the Banyankore. Their land is part of the Ryampara hill country, between two flat, dry, and less populated areas of land. On the hills, the average monthly rainfall is 970mm, with two short dry months in June and July and a short, less severe, dry month in January. Seven months out of the year the rainfall is over 1000mm per month. Their primary crop productions are bananas and coffee; they use these as cash crops. Farmers still use substantial areas for millet farming. This is their main food crop. They have intensive home gardens to produce for the families' needs and the outlying farming is used mostly for cash crop production, where coffees and bananas are cultivated using intercropping methods.

=== Southern Africa ===
In Southern Africa, conglomerates of farming companies have primarily written-off the lands in Northwest Zambia. The land is mostly made of plateaus, with lower-lying lands in the Kabompo and Zambezi river valleys. Much of the area is in the Congo–Zambezi watershed, the area of land where all the sources of water run into the same river basin. The land has several types of soil. There are areas of yellow clay, with higher concentrations of sand, where higher rainfall causes soil erosion; this makes farming in those areas difficult. There are also areas with fertile red clay; these are rich soils good for cultivation of crops. Farmers in the area grow sorghum, millet, sweet potatoes, pumpkin, and maize. There is marginal maize production, used as a cash crop for the community. The area is usually covered by thick forestation that must be cleared before crops can be cultivated; they do not practice agroforestry. Traditionally, spouses must maintain their own gardens. The produce is shared communally, but the practice leads to intensive home gardens that are maintained by the women of the villages.

== South Pacific ==
=== Highlander horticulture ===
The Enga of the Western Highlands Province in New Guinea receive most of their food from growing sweet potatoes Ipomoea batatas which they plant in mulch mounds at elevations up to 2,700 m or higher. The mounds that the Enga make to plant their crops of potatoes are formed from by piling large amounts of grass taken from fallow, or unplanted, plots then by covering the grass with dirt. The size of the mounds depends on elevation; the higher the elevation; the bigger the mounds will be. Mounds above 2,500 m in altitude can have a height of 0.85 m in height; while crops below 1,500 m are not mounded at all. The function of the mound is to protect the crops from the frequent frosts that occur at the high altitudes of the Enga. With sweet potatoes having a very long maturation period of nine months, the Enga also invest their time and space on the mounds with planting other crops that have much shorter maturation periods such as peas in case a heavy frost does claim the crop.

The planting of the mounds is done so that the plants which have a higher frost tolerance, such as the Irish potatoes, are planted casually throughout the mound and the low tolerant sweet potatoes are planted in the best position to avoid the frost. Peas, beans, and cabbage which are all highly tolerant to frost will be planted outside the circle of sweet potatoes and lower on the mound placing them closer to the cold temperatures of the ground. The Enga practice fallow rotation where a garden will in crop for about four years followed by about four years of fallow grassland to let the soil replenish.

Garden size for an average Enga garden is about 0.21 hectare or about 2,100 square meters and can contain a few hundred mounds. Another gardening strategy the Enga have implemented is the use of kin lands that are usually within one to two days walk from the farmers normal planting grounds. The uses of multiple gardens at differing elevation and the ability access clan lands in different areas for gardening have allowed the Enga to adapt to their environment and survive under harsh conditions.

=== Lowland Swidden cultivation ===
Swidden cultivation is an extensive agriculture practice that is also known as slash-and-burn agriculture. The process is extensive because it requires a vast amount of land divided into several plots with one plot planted for a period of years, while the other plots lay fallow for a number of years.

For the Bine-speaking peoples of the New Guinea lowlands swidden cultivation is a main practice for crop propagation. The main crop the Bine grow is the taro root, although they grow about 15 subsidiary crops including: sweet potato, banana, manioc, maize, yam, pawpaw, sugar cane, pineapple, and others. The swiddens which can be placed in either savannas or forests are created by cutting down all the vegetation in the area that the swidden will be. The farmers then pile all of the cut vegetation on the swidden plot and leave it to dry out through the dry season. Right before the wet season begins the piles are burned and the soil and ash are tilled together. The process of tilling the soil and ash mixes the carbon and nitrogen rich ash into the soil thereby fertilizing the soil for the coming crop. After the soil is tilled the crops are planted.

There are two planting years for a single swidden for the Bine farmers. In the first year the Bine plant primary taro root with a few subsidiary crops like bananas and sweet potatoes. In the second year taro root makes up about 50 percent of the swidden and the rest of the swidden is mixed with about 15 other plants. After the second year the Bine farmers move on to an adjacent swidden and allow the previous swidden to lay fallow or unplanted for a period of 5 to 10 years in order to repopulate the vegetation. The number of years that a swidden will lay fallow is determined by the plants demand for the nitrogen in the soil. Some plants will leach the soil of nitrogen in a few years and require four or five times that fallow; while other plants can be planted for many years and lay fallow only one or two times the planting period. Swidden cultivation requires a lot of land in order to feed only a few people, but the Bine, whose numbers are low, make good uses of their land through swidden farming.

=== Island horticulture ===
For most South Pacific Island cultures the main subsistence techniques are hunting and gathering. Fishing and the gathering of sago, banana, and other tropical foods are the norm with very little organized agriculture. The Tabalu of Kiriwina located in the Trobriand Islands practice a form of agriculture called Kaylu'ebila, a form of garden magic. The main crop for the Tabalu is the yam and there is a definite division of labour according to sex when it comes to gardening. Heavy work is done by the men and it includes clearing the vegetation, caring the yam supports, and planting the yam tubers in the ground. The women aid by weeding the gardens.

Gardening for the Tabalu is a long and in-depth magical process; with special magicians and magical ingredients being handed down by family members over time. Garden fields (called Kwabila) are fenced in on all sides to keep out the swine that are bred by the Tabalu. Kwabila are then divided into many smaller plots called baleko. These are the individual gardens that the crops will be planted in.

== South America ==
South America consists of modern-day Venezuela, Colombia, Ecuador, Suriname, Brazil, Peru, Bolivia, Paraguay, Uruguay, Argentina, and Chile. South America has historically been a land exploited not only for its natural resources, but also for its indigenous knowledge and labor force. The environmental diversification of South America has been at the foundation of its presence in the global economy as a resource for agriculture, forestry, fishing, hunting, livestock, mining and quarrying.

South America can be seen as cultural regions inhabited by marginal tribes, tropical forest tribes, and the circum-Caribbean tribes each with its own distinct way of agricultural cultivation. South America's geographic regions are inhabited by regional tribes which include; the Chocó in the Northern Columbian area, The Kayapo in the Eastern Para area, the Chono in the Southern Fuegian area, and the Quechuas in the Western Peruvian area, Each of these regions has adapted not only their own cultural identity and agricultural style,

The Eastern region of South America is known as the Para area in what is now Brazil, and has for millennia been home to the tropical forest Kayapớ tribe. The Kayapớ lived in sedentary villages and were proficient in pottery and loom-weaving, yet they did not domesticate animals or poses knowledge on metallurgy. These Tropical forest Tribes can be characterized through their farming, dugout canoes, woven baskets, loom weaving, and pole and thatch houses.

In the Para area the Kayapớ like most tribes of this region practiced intensive agriculture or clearing cultivation. Beginning their agricultural year with a low water season intensifies fishing. The low water season is then followed by the high water season or harvest season. It is during this harvest season that the Kayapớ are able to exercise their leisure time before the cycle ends with (low water levels) and a return to intense fishing. Each changing season commences ceremonies for the Kayapớ that are directly tied to agriculture, hunting, or fishing. Unlike the Chocó the Kayapớ used an agricultural method known as the slash-burn method (shifting agriculture). The Kayapớ cut the forest in April to September (dry season) and time their burns just before the raining season. The Kayapớ used circular plots for agricultural cultivation consisting of five rings (characterized as cultivation zones). The first circle or the inner circle was used for taro and sweet potatoes that thrive in the hotter soil found in the center of the plot. The second circle cultivated maize, manioc, and rice an area that needed various ash enrichment treatments and would experience short term growth. The third zone was an area of rich soil and best served mixed crops including the banana, urucu, papaya. The fourth zones consists of shade loving plants and are for a medical purpose, yet evidence of beans and yams have been also found here. The fifth zone or the outer ring was left as a protective zone that included trap animals protective insects and birds. This form of agriculture requires not only intense physical labor but also requires a knowledge of not only the land, but various types of ground cover, shades and temperatures of local soils, as well as cloud formations to time careful burning. When the Kayapớ manage their agricultural plots they must work with a variety of interacting factors including the background soil fertility, the heterogeneous quality of ash and its distribution, crop nutrient requirements, cropping cycles, management requirements, and pest and disease control clearly illustrating the common misconception that this form of agriculture is primitive and ineffiecnet.

It has often been thought that the slash-burn plots are abandoned after one or two years because of un productive soil, but this is a common misconception. The Kayapớ revisit abandoned fields because plants can offer direct and indirect benefits. One direct benefit would be the ability to eat that which has been produced and an indirect benefit would be that open fields allow attract game for hunting and can produce long after they have been tended.

The Southern region of South America is known as the Fuegian area and is occupied by the Chono, Alacaluf and Yahgan. These Marginal tribes differed greatly from the other regions in that they were expert in making bark or plank canoes and domesticating dogs, hunting, fishing and gathering. Nomads with simple socio-religious patterns, yet completely lacked the technology of pottery, loom-weaving, metallurgy and even agriculture. Since there was a lack of agriculture in this region the Chono ate native berries, roots, fruits, and wild celery. The source of nutrition for the Chono, Yahgans, and Alcaaluf thus mainly consisted of sea food such as; whales, seal porpoises, guanacos, and otters. The Southern tribes of South America distinguished themselves not in having a rare form of agriculture like the North's slush-mush method or the having intensive agriculture like the East's sophisticated slash-burn method, yet were able to distinguished themselves in being absent of this trait.

== North America ==
Farming methods developed by Native Americans include terracing, irrigation, mound building, crop rotation and fertilization. They also used extensive companion planting (see the Three Sisters).

Terracing is an effective technique in a steep-sloped, semi-arid climate. The Indigenous farmers stair-stepped the hills so that soil erosion was minimal and land surface was better suited for farming. In the Southwest, including parts of New Mexico, Arizona, and parts of Northern Mexico, terracing was extensive. Terraces were constructed by placing rock dams to redirect runoff water to canals that evenly dispersed rain water. The terraced field transformed the terrain into land suitable for farming maize. There is evidence that terracing has been used in the Southwest for about 2,500 years. The Anasazi people from this region built reservoirs and directed rain water through ditches to water the crops in the terraces. The natives grew corn, squash, and beans, along with other crops in the terraced fields.

Corn, squash, and beans were staple crops for Native Americans and were grown throughout much of the North American continent. This trio is known as the Three sisters. Ancient folklore belief says that the Three Sisters represented three goddesses. Each sister protected the other two, and therefore the Three Sisters should never be separated and instead be planted, cooked, and consumed together. In reality, This Triad was an example of symbiotic planting. The corn stalks functioned as a support for the beans. The beans fixed nitrogen into a usable form for the corn and squash, and the broad squash leaves provided shade for the soil, which aided in preventing evaporation and controlling weeds. As the success of the Three Sisters spread, many cultures turned away from hunting and gathering and relied much more on farming. Geographically native cultures in the Woodlands, Prairie, Plains, Great Basin, and Plateau regions of North America all utilized the Three Sisters to some extent. Where they were not grown, the locals traded for them. Nomadic tribes, such as the Dakotas, would trade meat for these vegetable staples. The Three Sisters were usually eaten in unison, as they provide fairly balanced nutrition when consumed together(for example, beans and corn together provide a complete set of the essential amino acids).

Native American farmers also employed irrigation. This technique was utilized throughout much of the Southwest and is useful where water is scarce. Irrigation was and is still used today throughout much of the world. Native Americans controlled the amount of water that reached their fields by building long irrigation canals to redirect water from a source to water their crops. The Hohokam people constructed about 600 miles of irrigation canals from AD 50 to 1450 near Phoenix, Arizona. Part of the canal is used by the City of Phoenix today. The Olmecs of Mesoamerica built canals over 4,000 years ago.

Chinampas, artificial islands constructed in swamplands and lakes, were invented by Mayan farmers and the technique became used extensively throughout Mesoamerica and was later used by the Aztecs as part of the land reclamation process of the city of Tenochtitlan. This technique increases arable land, and provided additional farming plots the population of Mesoamerica grew.

In the Northeast Woodlands and the Great Lakes region, an advanced society known as the Moundbuilders emerged. This society lived in the flood plains of the Mississippi river basin. This culture farmed mainly maize. They had little need for foraging and grew to an advanced civilization due to food surplus. They were the largest civilization north of the Rio Grande.

Native Americans also developed storage systems such as storage containers which allowed them to store seeds to plant during the next planting season. They also stored food in dug-out pits or holes in hillsides. Native Americans developed corn cribs. These were storage bins that were elevated off the ground. This technique prevented moisture and animal intrusion.

Selective crop breeding was also employed. Corn is a domestic plant and cannot grow on its own. The first corn grown by Native Americans had small ears, and only produced a few kernels per ear. By 2,000 years ago, single stalks with large ears were being produced. Native Americans created over 700 varieties of corn by 1500 AD.

== "Hands-off" hunter and gatherer misconception ==
Anderson breaks down common misconceptions surrounding the way in which Native Americans lived among nature and shows that their true impact was often one that attracted and invited others to the land they inhabited. Native Americans, regardless of location, were privy to wildlife management such as, "coppicing, pruning, harrowing, sowing, weeding, burning, digging, thinning, and selective harvesting." These practices were acted out in calculated intervals according to season and by witnessing the signals conveyed by nature to do so and, "on the whole, allowed for sustainable harvest of plants over centuries." Anderson's writing focuses specifically on Natives established in California and emphasizes these techniques applied by them to be essential in maintaining, and even creating, the rich Californian landscapes settlers later happened upon, such as: the coastal prairies, valley grasslands, and oak savannas.

Overall, the Native's practices were nature conserving and sustaining due to the specificity of their environmental knowledge which was learned through more than twelve-thousand years of trial and error. Anderson also establishes that the Native's practices were most likely not always beneficial or environmentally friendly. Though he asserts that there is no real evidence of their destruction available, it is possible that the Indigenous peoples in California may have been responsible for the extinction of early regional species.

In discussing California Native's "tempered" land tenure practices, Anderson deconstructs the idea of Native Americans as hunter-gatherers whose sparse population and nomadic ways left little to no mark on the land they traveled. When European and Asian farmers, ranchers, and entrepreneurs established themselves in that same land, the concept of their surroundings that they perpetuated was one of an uninhabited wilderness, untouched by man. Though as Anderson points out, this was never the case. This "wilderness" was carefully tended to by the Natives for hundreds of years who had both negative and positive impacts on its conservation. It is theorized by Anderson that without the Natives' calculated intervention, real wilderness in the form of thickets, dense understory, and wildfire would have deemed the land uninhabitable. In establishing this belief, the foreign settlers not only erased the Native's long history of masterful cultivation from the land, but they pushed their people out of the land as well, establishing a new, Eurocentric construction of the American's continent. This constructed history has not only diminished Native ancestry and culture, but also the land, which is no longer maintained or protected by strategic resource management. The European way of mitigating resource and land depletion follows a "hands off" model, which comes from the misconceptions of "leave no trace" mentioned previously.
