= Cultivated plant taxonomy =

Theory and science of cultivated plant classification

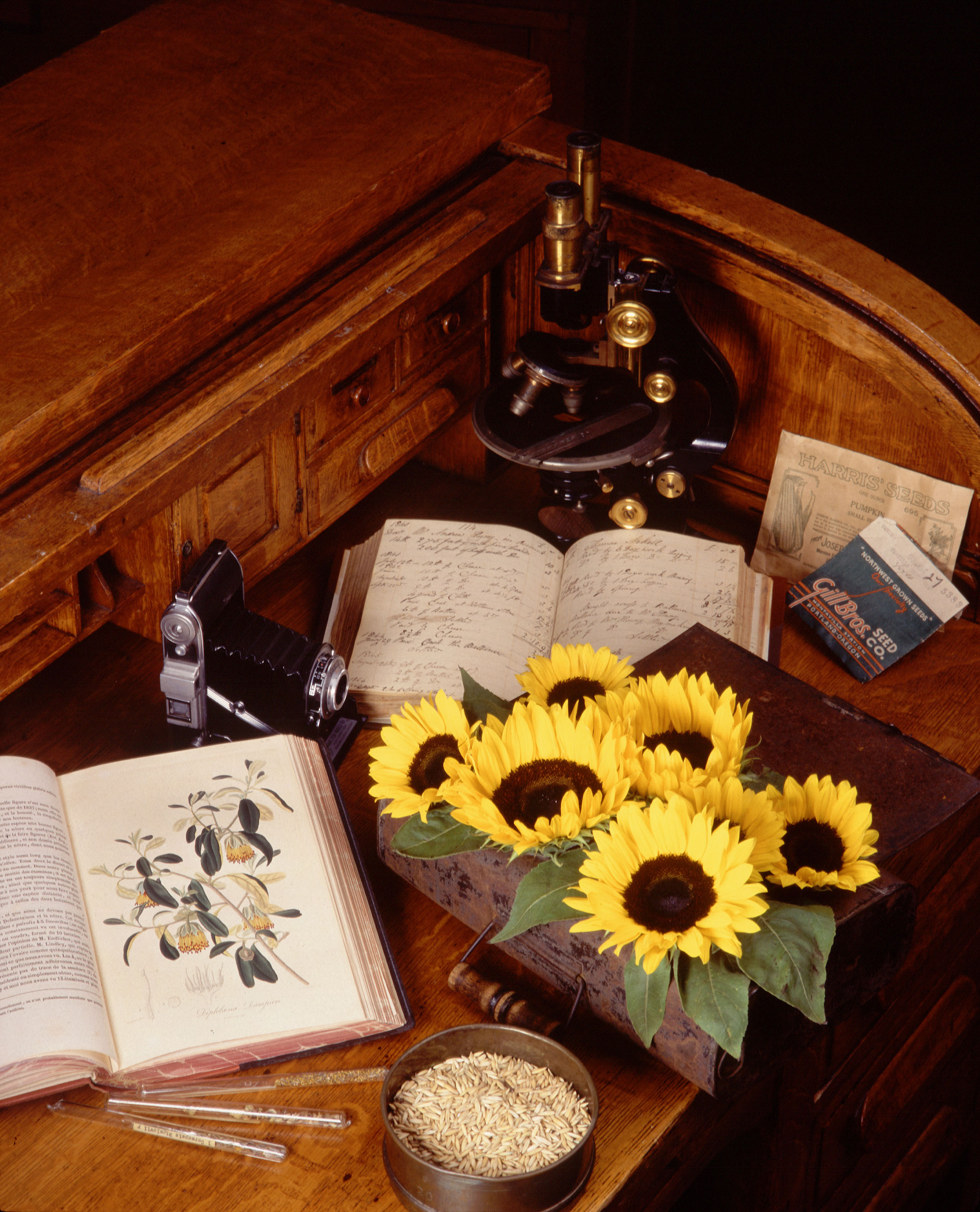
Some of the traditional tools of cultivated plant taxonomy including: microscope, camera, flowers and book to assist identification.

Cultivated plant taxonomy is the study of the theory and practice of the science that identifies, describes, classifies, and names cultigens—those plants whose origin or selection is primarily due to intentional human activity. Cultivated plant taxonomists do, however, work with all kinds of plants in cultivation.

Cultivated plant taxonomy is one part of the study of horticultural botany which is mostly carried out in botanical gardens, large nurseries, universities, or government departments. Areas of special interest for the cultivated plant taxonomist include: searching for and recording new plants suitable for cultivation (plant hunting); communicating with and advising the general public on matters concerning the classification and nomenclature of cultivated plants and carrying out original research on these topics; describing the cultivated plants of particular regions (horticultural floras); maintaining databases, herbaria and other information about cultivated plants.

Much of the work of the cultivated plant taxonomist is concerned with the naming of plants as prescribed by two plant nomenclatural Codes. The provisions of the International Code of Nomenclature for algae, fungi, and plants (Botanical Code) serve primarily scientific ends and the objectives of the scientific community, while those of the International Code of Nomenclature for Cultivated Plants (Cultivated Plant Code) are designed to serve both scientific and utilitarian ends by making provision for the names of plants used in commerce—the cultigens that have arisen in agriculture, forestry and horticulture. These names, sometimes called variety names, are not in Latin but are added to the scientific Latin names, and they assist communication among the community of foresters, farmers and horticulturists.

The history of cultivated plant taxonomy can be traced from the first plant selections that occurred during the agrarian Neolithic Revolution to the first recorded naming of human plant selections by the Romans. The naming and classification of cultigens followed a similar path to that of all plants until the establishment of the first Cultivated Plant Code in 1953 which formally established the cultigen classification category of cultivar. Since that time the classification and naming of cultigens has followed its own path.

== Distinctive characteristics ==
Cultivated plant taxonomy has been distinguished from the taxonomy of other plants in at least five ways.

- Firstly, there is a distinction made according to where the plants are growing — that is, whether they are wild or cultivated. This is alluded to by the Cultivated Plant Code which specifies in its title that it is dealing with cultivated plants.
- Secondly, a distinction is made according to how the plants originated. This is indicated in Principle 2 of the Cultivated Plant Code which defines the scope of the Code as "... plants whose origin or selection is primarily due to the intentional actions of mankind" — plants that have evolved under natural selection with human assistance.
- Thirdly, cultivated plant taxonomy is concerned with plant variation that requires the use of special classification categories that do not conform with the hierarchy of ranks implicit in the Botanical Code, these categories being the cultivar, Group and grex (which are only loosely equivalent to ranks in the Botanical Code). This feature is also referred to in the Preamble to the Cultivated Plant Code which states that "The purpose of giving a name to a taxon is not to indicate its characters or history, but to supply a means of referring to it and to indicate to which category it is assigned."
- Fourthly, cultivated plant taxonomy serves a particular community of people: the Botanical Code focuses on the needs of plant taxonomists as they attempt to maintain order and stability for the scientific names of all plants, while the Cultivated Plant Code caters for the needs of people requiring names for plants used in the commercial world of agriculture, forestry and horticulture.
- Finally, the difference between cultivated plant taxonomy and the taxonomy of other plants has been attributed to the purpose for which the taxonomy has been devised, it being plant-centred in the Botanical Code and human-centred in the Cultivated Plant Code.

== Scientific and anthropocentric classification ==
The key activities of cultivated plant taxonomy relate to classification (taxonomy) and naming (nomenclature). The rules associated with naming plants are separate from the methods, principles or purposes of classification, except that the units of classification, the taxa, are placed in a nested hierarchy of ranks – like species within genera, and genera within families. There are three classification categories used in the Cultivated Plant Code, the cultivar and the Group and the grex, but they are only loosely equivalent to ranks in the Botanical Code.

From the time of the ancient world, at least, plants have been classified in two ways. On the one hand there is the detached academic, philosophical or scientific interest in plants themselves: this groups plants by their relationship to one another according to their similarities and differences in structure and function. Then there is the practical, utilitarian or anthropocentric interest which groups plants according to their human use. Cultivated plant taxonomy is concerned with the special classification categories needed for the plants of agriculture, horticulture and forestry as regulated by the Cultivated Plant Code. This Code serves not only the scientific interests of formal nomenclature, it also caters for the special utilitarian needs of people dealing with the plants of commerce. Those cultigens given names governed by the Cultivated Plant Code fulfill three criteria: they have special features considered of sufficient importance to warrant a name; the special features are the result of deliberate human breeding or selection and are not found in wild populations (except in rare cases where the special features represent desirable part of natural variation found in wild populations that is not covered by a scientific name); it is possible to perpetuate the desirable features by propagation in cultivation.

The terms cultigen and cultivar may be confused with each other. Cultigen is a general-purpose term for plants that have been deliberately altered or specially selected by humans, while cultivar is a formal classification category. Cultigens include not only plants with cultivar names but also those with names in the classification categories of grex and Group. The Cultivated Plant Code points out that cultigens are: deliberately selected plants that may have arisen by intentional or accidental hybridization in cultivation, by selection from existing cultivated stocks, or from variants within wild populations that are maintained as recognizable entities solely by continued propagation. Included within the group of plants known as cultigens are genetically modified plants, plants with binomial Latin names that are the result of ancient human selection, and any plants that have been altered by humans but which have not been given formal names. In practice most cultigens are cultivars.

The following account of the historical development of cultivated plant taxonomy traces the way cultigens have arisen and been incorporated into botanical science; it also demonstrates how two approaches to plant nomenclature and classification have led to the present-day International Code of Nomenclature for algae, fungi, and plants and International Code of Nomenclature for Cultivated Plants.

== Historical development ==
The history of cultigen nomenclature has been discussed by William T. Stearn and Brandenberg, Hetterscheid and Berg. It has also been examined from a botanical perspective and from the origin of the Cultivated Plant Code in 1953 until 2004.

The early development of cultigen taxonomy follows that of plant taxonomy in general as the early listing and documentation of plants made little distinction between those that were anthropogenic and those that were natural wild kinds. Formal botanical nomenclature and classification evolved from the simple binomial system of folk taxonomy and it was not until the mid-19th century that the nomenclatural path of cultigens began to diverge from mainstream plant taxonomy.

=== 10,000 to 400 BCE – plant domestication ===
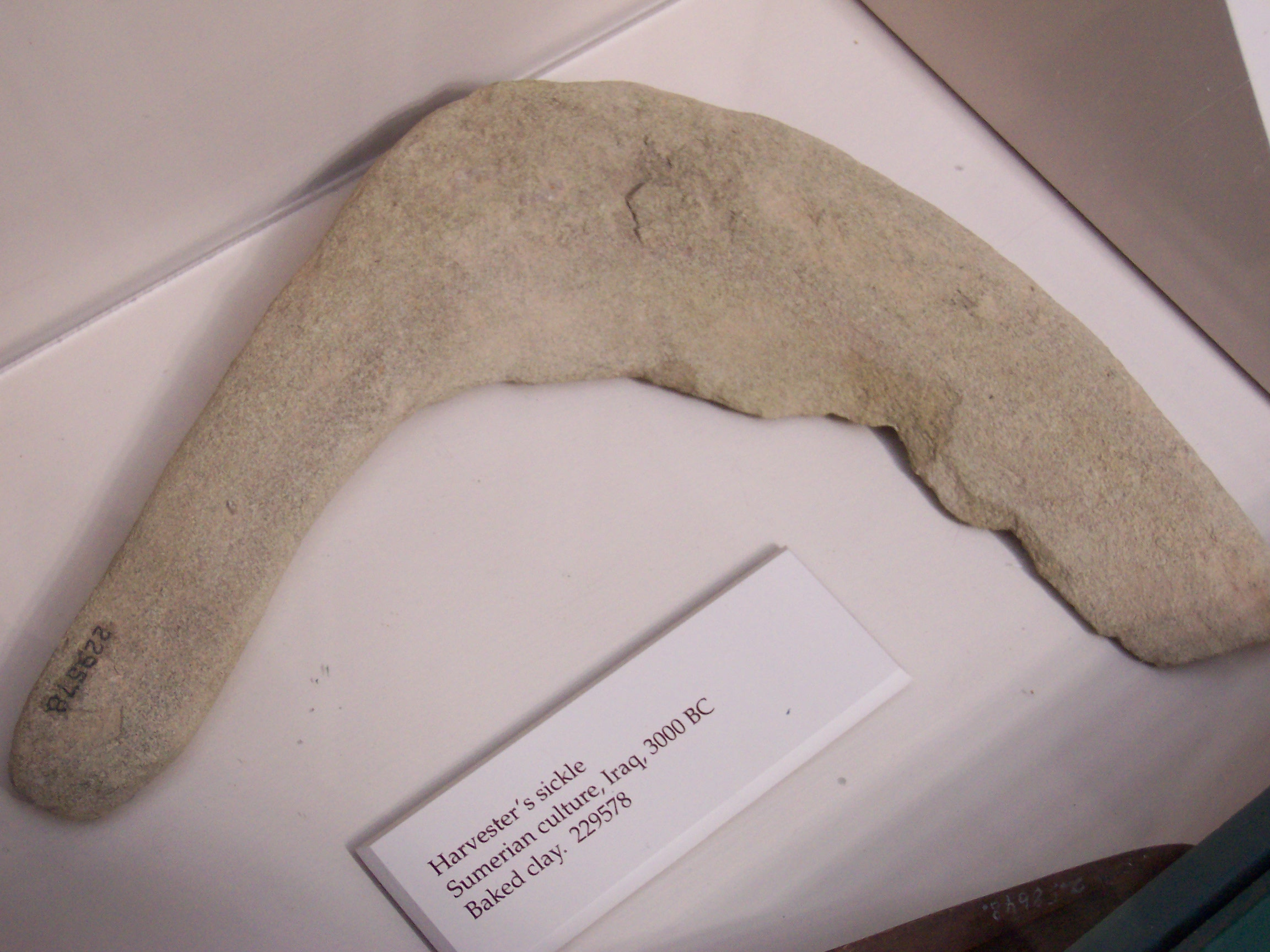
Sumerian harvester's sickle made from baked clay and dated to about 3000 BCE

William T. Stearn (1911–2001), taxonomic botanist, classical scholar and author of the book Botanical Latin has commented that "cultivated plants [cultigens] are mankind's most vital and precious heritage from remote antiquity". Cultigens of our most common economic plants probably date back to the first settled communities of the Neolithic Revolution 10,000 to 12,000 years ago although their exact time and place of true origin will probably remain a mystery. Among the first cultigens would have been selections of the cereals wheat and barley that arose in the early settlements of the Fertile Crescent (the fertile river valleys of the Nile, Tigris and Euphrates). Food plant selections would also have been made in the ten or so other centres of settlement that occurred around the world at this time. Confining crops to local areas gave rise to landraces (selections that are highly adapted to local conditions) although these are now largely replaced by modern cultivars. Cuttings are an extremely effective way of perpetuating desirable characters, especially of woody plants like grapes, figs and olives so it is not surprising that these are among the first known plant selections perpetuated in cultivation in the West. Migrating people would take their plant seeds and cuttings with them; there is evidence of early Fertile Crescent cereal cultigens being transferred from Western Asia to surrounding lands.

=== 400 BCE to 1400 – the ancient world: Greco-Roman influence to the Middle Ages ===
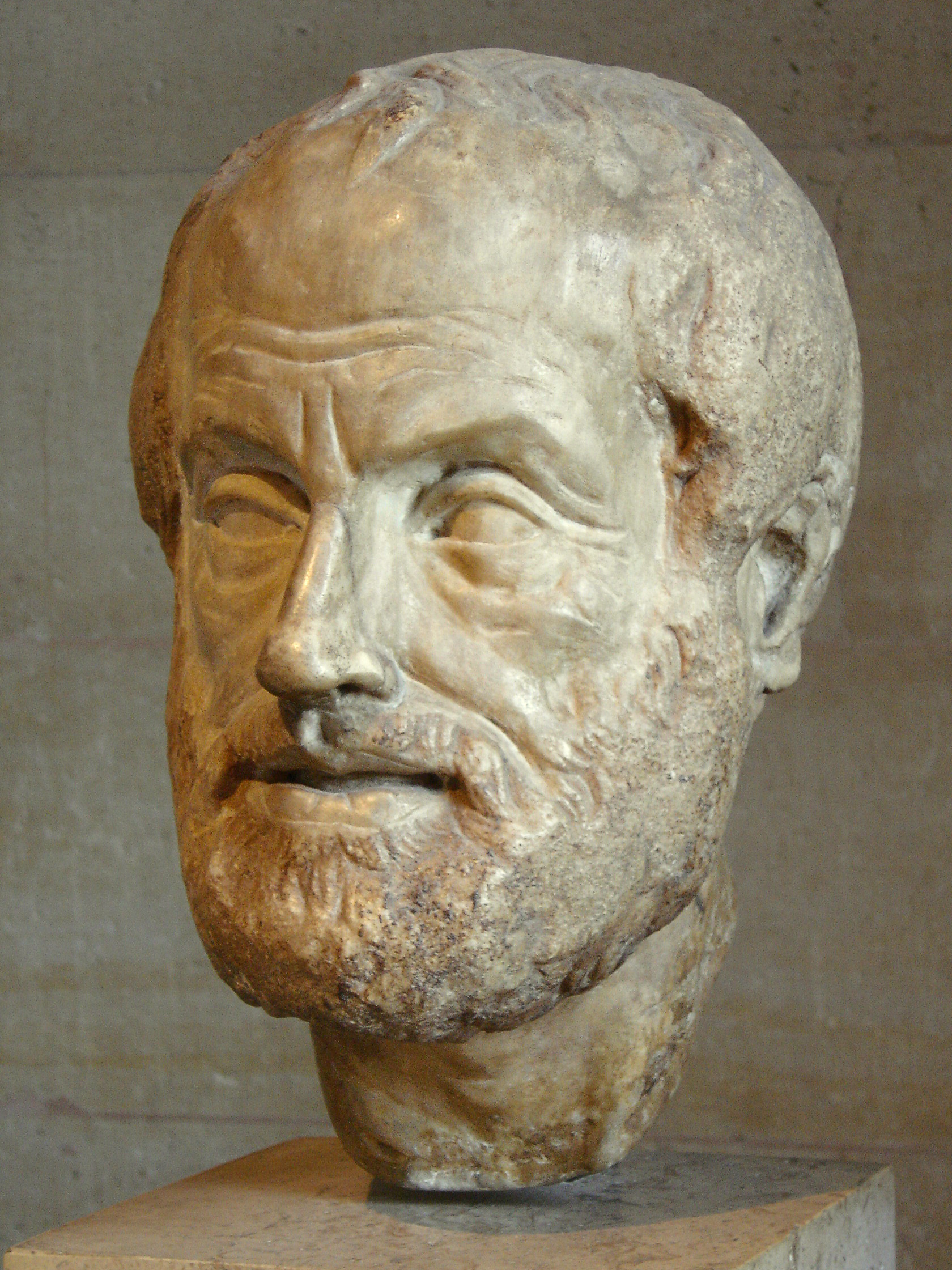
Aristotle (384–322 BCE)

As early as the 5th century BCE the Greek philosopher Hippo expressed the opinion that cultigens (as we call them now) were produced from wild plants as the result of the care bestowed on them by man, a revolutionary view at a time when they were regarded as the special creation and gift of the gods. In devising ways of classifying organisms the philosopher Aristotle (384–322 BCE) established the important idea of a fundamentum divisionis — the principle that groups can be progressively subdivided. This has been assumed in biological classification ever since and is congruent with the relatively recent idea of evolution as descent with modification. All biological classification follows this principle of groups within groups, known as a nested hierarchy, but this form of classification does not necessarily presuppose evolution.

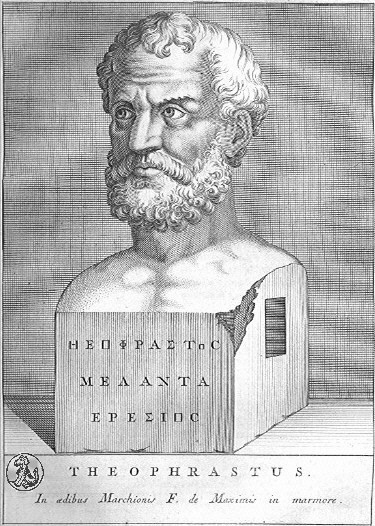
Theophrastus (371–286 BCE)

The earliest scientific (rather than utilitarian) approach to plants is attributed to Aristotle's student Theophrastus (371–286 BCE), known as the "father of botany". In his Enquiry into Plants Theophrastus described 480 kinds of plant, dividing the plant kingdom into trees, shrubs, undershrubs and herbs with further subdivision into wild and cultivated, flowering and non-flowering, deciduous or evergreen.

The utilitarian approach, classifying plants according to their medicinal properties, is exemplified by the work of Roman nobleman, scientist and historian, Pliny the Elder (29–79 CE) author of Natural History. "Cultivars" listed here are named after people, places or special plant characteristics. Most notable is the work of Dioscorides (ca.40–ca.90 CE) a Greek doctor who worked with the Roman army. His five-volume Materia Medica was a forerunner of the herbal which led to the modern pharmacopoeia. This work was endlessly plagiarised by later herbals including those printed between about 1470 and 1670 CE: it listed 600 to 1000 different kinds of plants including the cultigens Gallica, Centifolia, the rose of uncertain origin known as Alba and other rose cultivars grown by the Romans.

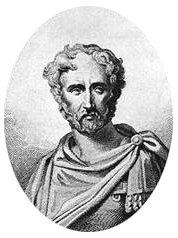
Pliny the Elder (29–79 CE)

The first record of a named cultigen occurs in De Agri Cultura. written about 160 BCE by Roman statesman Cato the Elder (234–149 BCE) in a list that includes 120 kinds (cultivars) of figs, grapes, apples and olives. The names are presented in a way that implies that they would have been familiar to fellow Romans. The "cultivar" names were mostly of one word and denoted the provenance of the cultivar (the geographical origin of the place where the plant selections were made). Writers up to the 15th century added little to this early work. In the Middle Ages the book of hours, early herbals, illuminated manuscripts and economic records indicate that plants grown by the Romans found their way into monastery gardens. For example, in 827 CE the following herbs were mentioned in the poem Hortulus by Walafrid Strabo as growing in the monastery garden of St Gallen in Switzerland: sage, rue, southernwood, wormwood, horehound, fennel, German iris, lovage, chervil, Madonna lily, opium poppy, clary, mint, betony, agrimony, catmint, radish, gallica rose, bottle gourd and melon. It seems likely that aromatic and culinary herbs were quite widespread and similar lists of plants occur in records of plants grown in Villa gardens at the time of Charlemagne (742–814 CE).

=== 1400 to 1700 – Renaissance, imperial expansion, herbals ===
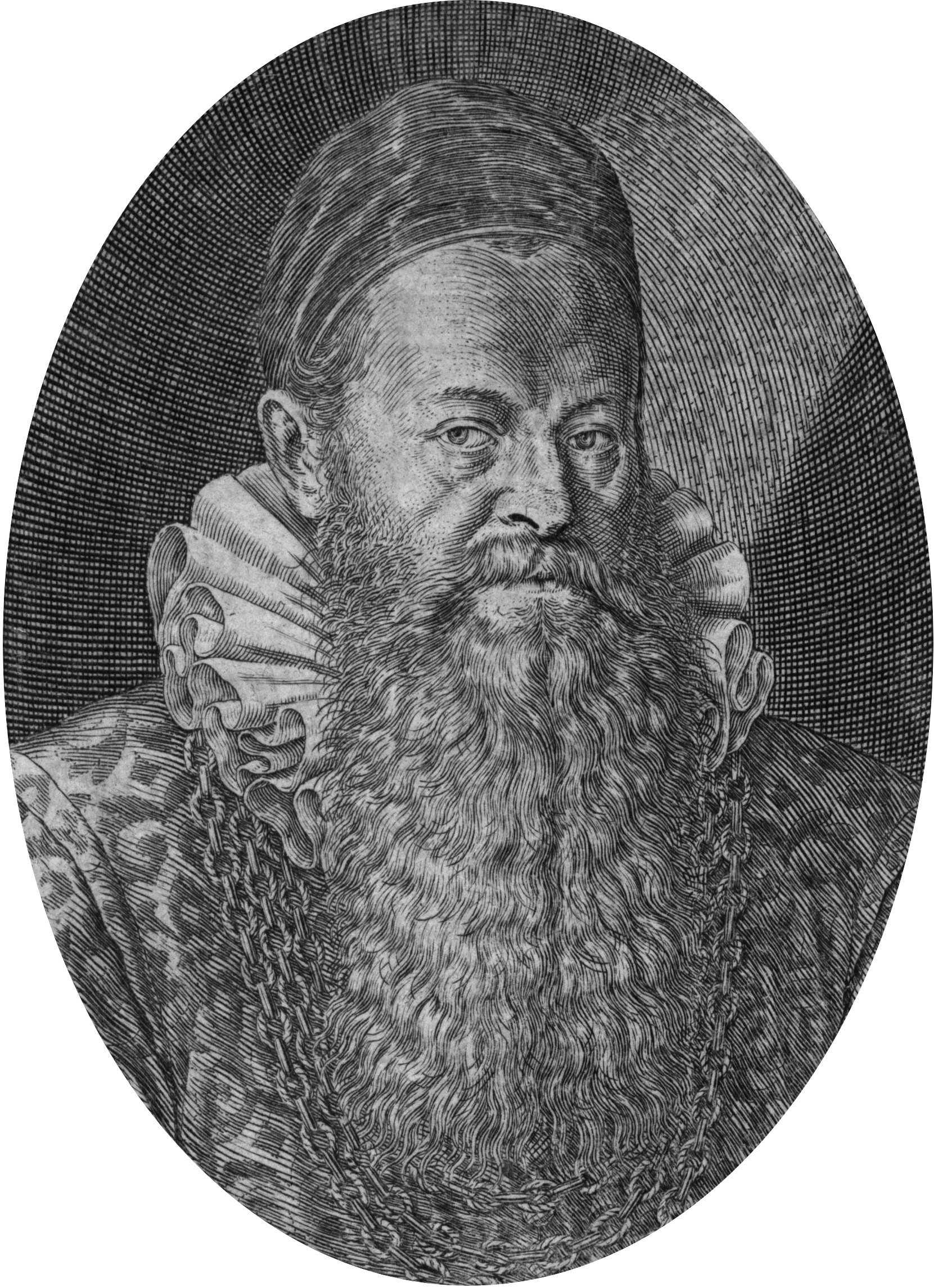
Caspar Bauhin (1550–1624)

The revival of learning during the Renaissance reinvigorated the study of plants and their classification. From about 1400 CE European expansion established Latin as the common language of scholars and it was adopted for biological nomenclature. Then, from about 1500 CE, the publication of herbals (books often illustrated with woodcuts describing the appearance, medicinal properties, and other characteristics of plants used in herbal medicine) extended the formal documentation of plants and by the late 16th century the number of different plant kinds described in Europe had risen to about 4,000. In 1623 Gaspard Bauhin published his Pinax theatre botanici an attempt at a comprehensive compilation of all plants known at that time: it included about 6000 kinds. The combined works of a German physician and botanist Valerius Cordus (1515–1544 CE) which were published in 1562 included many named "cultivars" including 30 apples and 49 pears, presumably local German selections. English herbalist John Parkinson's Paradisi in Sole ... (1629) lists 57 apple "cultivars", 62 pears, 61 plums, 35 cherries and 22 peaches.

With increasing trade in economic and medicinal plants the need for a more comprehensive classification system increased. Up to about 1650 CE plants had been grouped either alphabetically or according to utilitarian folk taxonomy – by their medicinal uses or whether they were trees, shrubs or herbs. Between 1650 and 1700 CE there was a move from the utilitarian back to a scientific natural classification based on the characters of the plants themselves.

=== 1700 to 1750 – dawn of scientific classification ===
In 1700 French botanist J.P. de Tournefort although still using the broad groupings of "trees" and "herbs" for flowering plants, began to use flower characteristics as distinguishing features and, most importantly, provided a clear definition of the genus as a basic unit of classification. In Institutiones Rei Herbariae he listed about 10,000 different plants, which he called species, organised into 698 genera with illustrations. The establishment of this precursor of scientific classification vastly improved the organisation of plant variation into approximately equivalent groups or ranks and many of his genera were later taken up by Carl Linnaeus. There was still at this time no common agreement on the way to present plant names so they ranged in length from one word to lengthy descriptive sentences. As the number of recorded plants increased this naming system became more unwieldy.

In England the tradition of documenting garden plants was established long before Linnaeus' Species Plantarum starting with the herbals, but the most prominent early chronicler was Philip Miller (1691–1771) who was a master gardener in charge of the Chelsea Physic Garden in London from 1722 to 1770. New plants were coming into Western Europe from southern Europe and the overseas colonies of the Dutch, British and French. These new plants came largely to the botanic gardens of Amsterdam, Leiden, Chelsea and Paris and they needed recording. In 1724 Miller produced a two-volume compendium of garden plants called The Gardeners and Florists Dictionary or a complete System of Horticulture. The first edition was in 1724, subsequently revised and enlarged until the last and 8th edition in 1768 by which time he had adopted Linnaean binomials. For a while this publication was taken as the starting point for "horticultural" nomenclature equivalent to Linnaeus' Species Plantarum which is now taken as the starting point for botanical nomenclature in general. Miller's Dictionary was the first of many English horticultural compendia whose history has been traced by William Stearn.

=== 1750 to 1800 – Linnaeus and binomial nomenclature ===
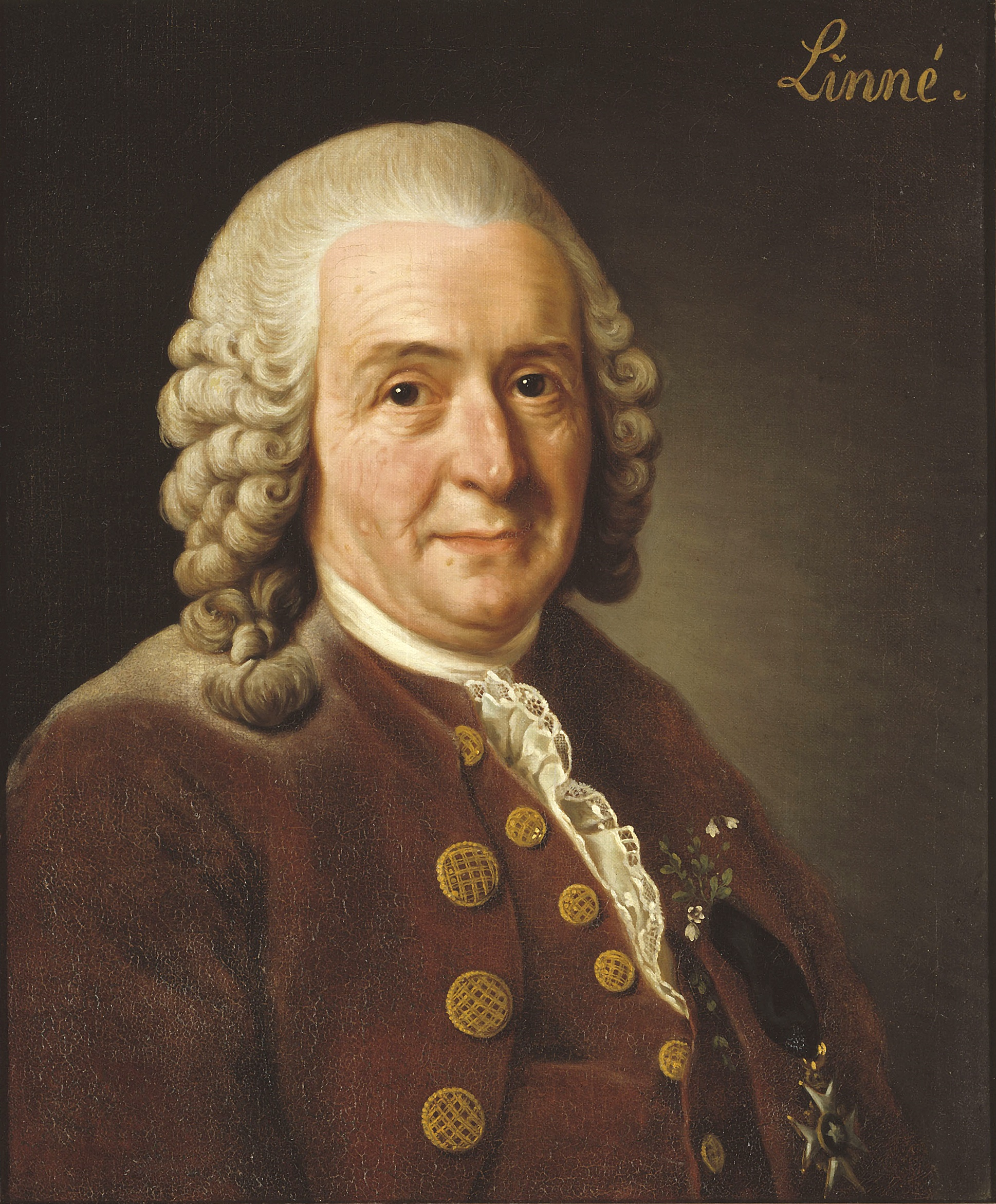
Carl Linnaeus (1707–1778), who established the binomial system of plant nomenclature

In the early 18th century colonial expansion and exploration created a demand for the description of thousands of new organisms. This highlighted difficulties in communication about plants, the replication of their descriptions, and the importance of an agreed way of presenting, publishing and applying their names.

It was the Swedish botanist Carl Linnaeus who finally put order into this situation as he attempted to name all the known organisms of his day. In 1735 his Systema Naturae, which included animals (the tenth edition became the starting point for zoological nomenclature) was followed by Critica Botanica in 1737, and Philosophia Botanica in 1751. But it was his most comprehensive work on plants, the 1753 publication Species Plantarum that formalised the name of a genus with a single epithet to form the name of a species as two words, the binomial thus making secure the biological system of binomial nomenclature. In these works Linnaeus used a third name as a variety within a species. These varieties included both wild and horticultural variants. The horticultural varieties were still written in Latin and some have persisted to this day.

Linnaeus had very definite and uncomplimentary views about cultigens, regarding them as inferior plants for the amusement of those people he disparagingly called anthophiles (flower-lovers); these were plants not deserving the attention of serious botanists. His views revealed both his prejudice, his stance on special creation, and his recognition of the difficulties entailed in cultivated plant taxonomy:

"anthophiles … practice a floral science all their own, grasped only by their devotees; no botanist in his senses will enlist in their camp."

"All the species recognized by Botanists came forth from the Almighty Creator's hand, and the number now and always will be exactly the same, while every day new and different florist's species arise from the true species recognized by botanists, and when they have arisen they eventually revert to their original forms. Accordingly to the former have been assigned by Nature fixed limits, beyond which they cannot go: while the latter display without end the infinite sport of Nature."

"... botany has been overborne by the system of varieties for long enough … few, if any, agree as to what constitutes a species, or what a variety; … I wish the system of varieties were entirely excluded from Botany and turned over entirely to the Anthophiles, since it causes nothing but ambiguities, errors, dead weight and vanity …"

=== 1800 to 1900 – global plant trade ===
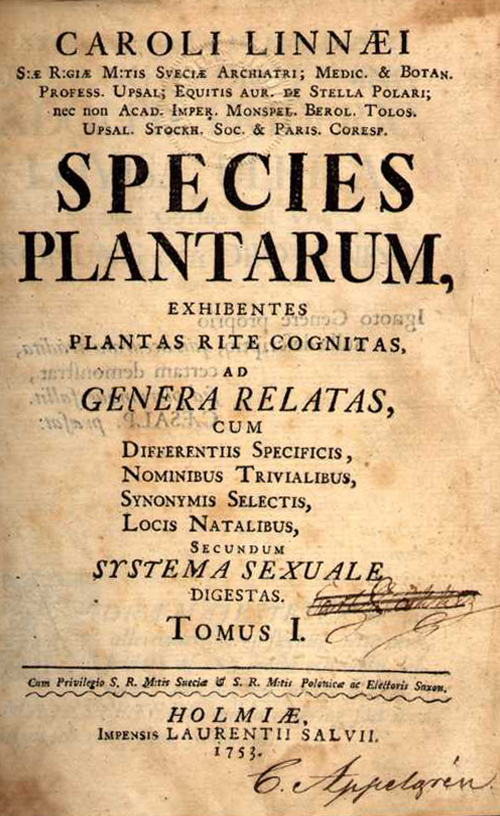
Linnaeus's Species Plantarum of 1753, his catalogue of all the world's plants known to European science

The natural distribution of plants across the world has determined when and where cultigens have been produced. The botanical and horticultural collection of economically important plants, including ornamentals, was based in Europe. Although economic herbs and spices had a long history in trade, and there are good records of cultivar distribution by the Romans, European botanical and horticultural exploration rapidly increased in the 19th century with the colonial expansion taking place at the time. New plants were brought back to Europe while, at the same time, valuable economic plants, including those from the tropics, were distributed among the colonies. This plant trade has provided the common global heritage of economic and ornamental cultigens that we use today and which formed the stock for modern plant selection, breeding, and genetic engineering. The plant exchange that occurred as a result of European trade can be divided into several phases:

- to 1560 mostly within Europe
- 1560–1620 Near East (esp. bulbous plants from Turkey – "tulipomania")
- 1620–1686 Canada and Virginia herbaceous plants
- 1687–1772 Cape of South Africa
- 1687–1772 North American trees and shrubs
- 1772–1820 Australia, Tasmania, New Zealand
- 1820–1900 Tropical glasshouse plants; hardy Japanese plants
- 1900–1930 West China
- 1930 Intensive breeding and selection programs

=== 1900 to 1950 – the Botanical Code and cultigen nomenclature ===
As the community of people dealing with the cultigens of commerce grew so, once again, the divergence between taxonomy serving scientific purposes and utilitarian taxonomy meeting human needs re-emerged. In 1865 German botanist Karl Koch, who became General Secretary of the Berlin Horticultural Society, expressed resentment at the continued use of Latin for cultigen names. Many proposals to deal with this were made, perhaps the most prominent being the Lois de la nomenclature botanique submitted in 1867 to the fourth Horticultural and Botanical Congress by Swiss botanist Alphonse de Candolle who, in Article 40 stated:

"Seedlings, half-breeds (métis) of unknown origin or sports should receive from horticulturists fancy names (noms de fantaisie) in common language, as distinct as possible from the Latin names of species or varieties."

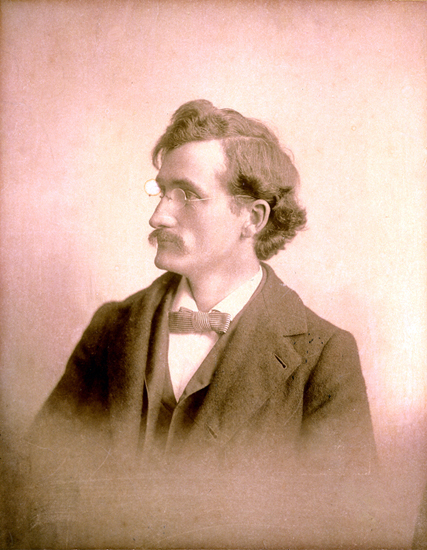
American cultivated plant taxonomist Liberty Hyde Bailey (1858–1954)

This Article, making provision for the cultigens of horticultural nomenclature was to remain in the Botanical Code (with a minor amendment in 1935 suggesting the use of the letter 'c' before the horticultural name and antedating formal recognition of the cultivar) through 1906, 1912 and 1935 until the separation, in 1953, of the Horticultural Code, precursor to the International Code of Nomenclature for Cultivated Plants (Cultivated Plant Code). In 1900 there was the first International Botanical Congress and in 1905 at the second Congress in Vienna an agreed set of nomenclatural rules was established, the Vienna Rules, which became known from then on as the International Code of Botanical Nomenclature (now the International Code of Nomenclature for algae, fungi, and plants). After World War II the responsibility for the Botanical Code was taken up by the International Association for Plant Taxonomy and meetings to discuss revisions are held at six-yearly intervals, the latest being in 2005.

In horticulture at this time there existed all the problems that had confronted botanists in the 19th century – a plethora of names of various length, written and published in many languages with much duplication. The period between 1867 and 1953 was an uneasy time in which American horticulturists and other groups in Europe, such as the specialist orchid community, made attempts to put order into this chaos within their particular group of interest and devising their own rules for naming the plants of commerce. Friedrich Alefeld (1820–1872), who used Latin variety names, in a monographic study of beans, lentils and other legumes distinguished three infraspecific taxonomic categories: Unterart (subspecies), Varietäten Gruppe and Kultur-Varietät, all with Latin names. In doing this he was probably laying the ground for the later establishment of the cultigen classification categories cultivar and Group. In conjunction with the Brussels International Botanical Congress of 1910 there was an International Horticultural Congress having a horticultural nomenclature component.

As a result of general dissatisfaction and a submission from the Royal Horticultural Society the Règles de Nomenclature Horticole was established. The use of simple descriptive Latin names (e.g. compactus, nanus, prostratus) for horticultural variants was accepted and so too were names in the local language – which were not to be translated and should preferably consist of one word and a maximum of three. This first Horticultural Code consisted of 16 Articles. With the intercession of a World War I it was not until the 9th Horticultural Congress in London in 1930 that the rules of a Horticulture Nomenclature Committee were agreed and added as an appendix to the 1935 Botanical Code. The rules established in 1935 were accepted but needed to be extended to include the cultigens of agriculture and forestry, but it was only a result of discussions at the 1950 International Botanical Congress in Stockholm and the 18th International Horticultural Congress in London in 1952 the first International Code of Nomenclature for Cultivated Plants was published in 1953. The American horticultural botanist Liberty Hyde Bailey was responsible for coining the word cultigen in 1918 and cultivar in 1923, the word cultivar only coming into general circulation with the new Code of 1953. The use of these two terms belies the multitude of classification terms and categories that had been suggested as designations for cultigens.

=== 1953 – the International Code of Nomenclature for Cultivated Plants ===
The first Cultivated Plant Code (Wageningen), which was published in 1953, has been followed by eight subsequent editions – in 1958 (Utrecht), 1961 (update of 1958), 1969 (Edinburgh), 1980 (Seattle), 1995 (Edinburgh), 2004 (Toronto) and 2009 (Wageningen).

Following the structure of the Botanical Code the Cultivated Plant Code is set out in the form of an initial set of Principles followed by Rules and Recommendations that are subdivided into Articles. Amendments to the Cultivated Plant Code are prompted by international symposia for cultivated plant taxonomy which allow for rulings made by the International Commission on the Nomenclature of Cultivated Plants. Each new Cultivated Plant Code includes a summary of the changes made to the previous version and these have also been summarised for the period 1953 to 1995.

== International Association for Cultivated Plant Taxonomy ==
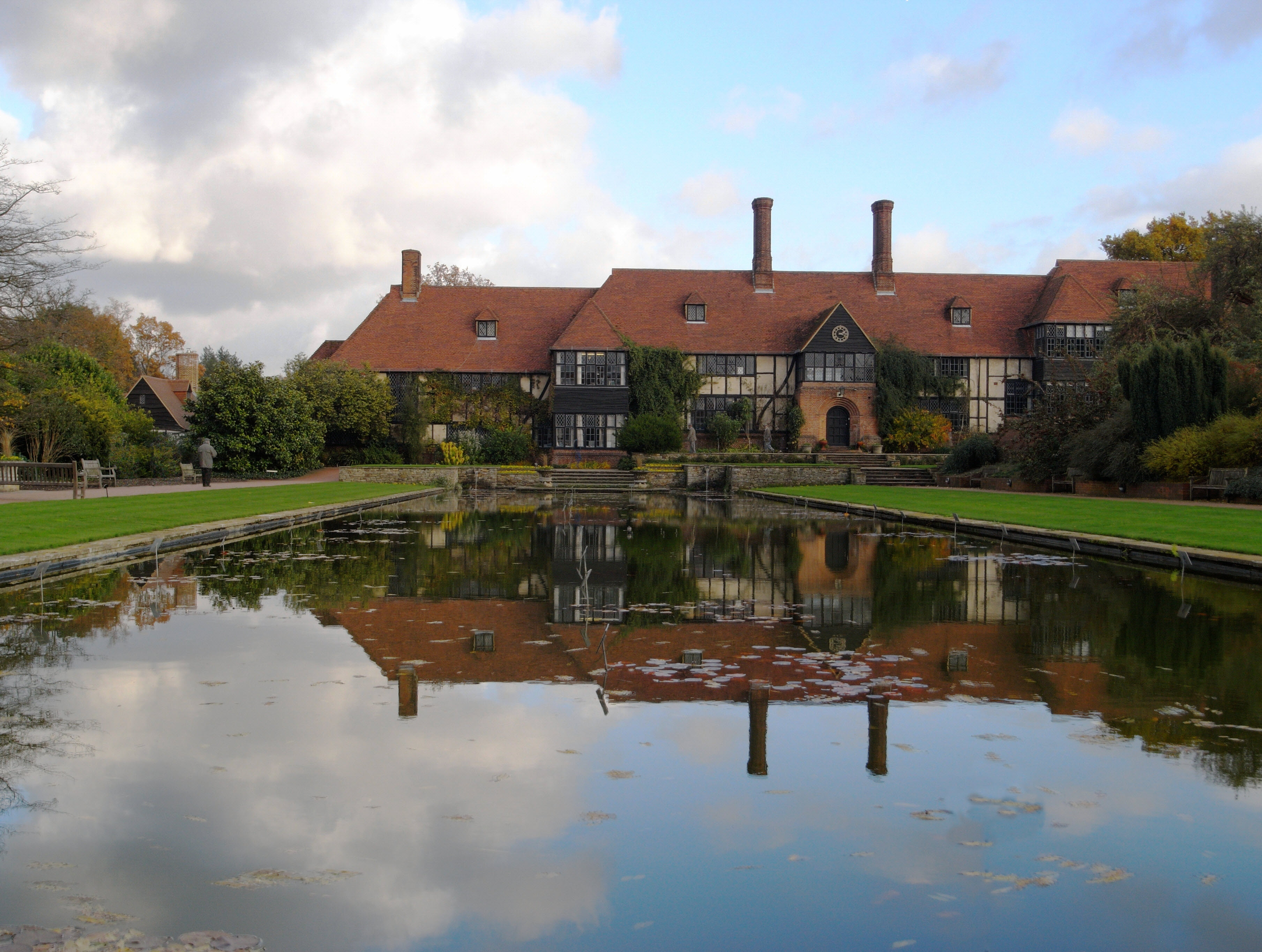
Wisley is one of the Royal Horticultural Society's flagship gardens and a focus for cultivated plant taxonomy.

Recent concerns have focused on international communication on cultivated plant taxonomy, organisation of international symposia, and general communication on topics of interest. In 1988 a Horticultural Taxonomy Group (Hortax) (Note: A committee of cultivated plant taxonomists based in the British Isles. Retrieved: 5 August 2010) was formed in the UK and a parallel organisation, the Nomenclature and Registration Working Group of the Vaste Keurings Commissie in the Netherlands. One development promoting discussion was the newsletter Hortax News which was superseded in February 2006 by the first issue of Hanburyana, a journal produced by the Royal Horticultural Society in London and dedicated to horticultural taxonomy. This filled a gap left when the American journal Baileya ceased publication in the early 1990s. Another development was the launch, in 2007, at the Sixth Symposium on the Taxonomy of Cultivated Plants at Wageningen of the International Association for Cultivated Plant Taxonomy. Hortax also publishes Plant Names: A Guide for Horticulturists, Nurserymen, Gardeners and Students.

== Presenting cultigen names ==
Most cultigens have names consisting of a Latin name that is governed by the International Code of Nomenclature for algae, fungi, and plants e.g. Malus domestica, to which is added a cultivar epithet, enclosed in single quotes e.g. Malus domestica 'Granny Smith'. The formation and use of the three classification categories (ranks) used for cultigens, the cultivar, Group and grex, is regulated by the ICNCP. Examples of acceptable ways to present cultigen names are given below:

Prunus serrata Sato-zakura Group
Prunus serrata (Sato-zakura Group) 'Ojochin'
Prunus 'Ojochin'
Flowering cherry 'Ojochin'

== Contemporary issues ==
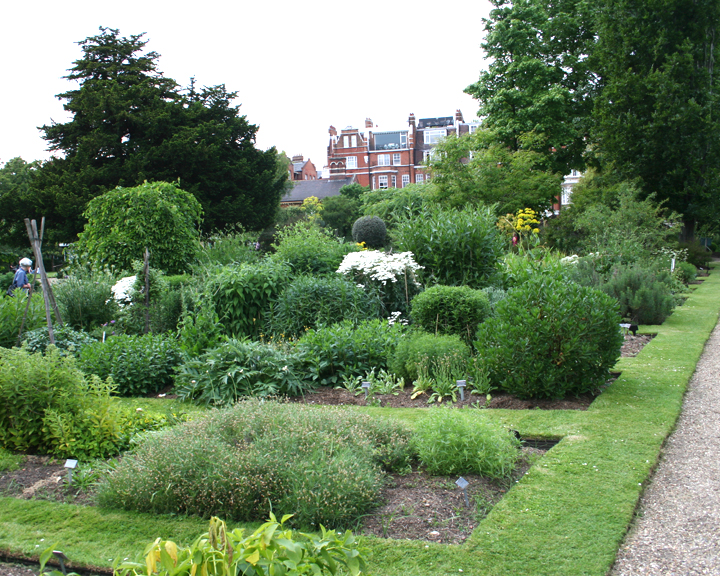
Chelsea Physic Garden, summer 2006

Current challenges for cultivated plant taxonomists include: the use of large plant name databases; ways of dealing with the use of non-scientific names in commerce (known as trade designations), especially for plant labels in nurseries; intellectual property and plants; adapting modern technology, in particular molecular techniques, to the creation and identification of cultivars; maintaining germplasm collections of cultivars, including herbaria; the recording and registration of cultivars.

The ways in which the plant variation resulting from human activity is named and classified remains contentious. The replacement of the expression "cultivated plant" with the word "cultigen" is not universally accepted. The debate continues concerning the notions of ranks and taxa as applied to cultigens. Is it appropriate to call the highly modified transgenic products of human artificial selection "taxa" in the same way we do for the products of natural selection in the wild? To overcome this difficulty the term culton (pl. culta) has been suggested to replace the word taxon when speaking about cultigens.

Then, most "wild" plants fit neatly into the nested hierarchy of ranks used in Linnaean classification (species into genera, genera into families etc.) which aligns with Darwinian descent with modification. Choosing classification categories for cultigens is not clear-cut. Included among cultigens are: simple selections taken from plants in the wild or in cultivation; artificial hybrids produced both by accident and intention; plants produced by genetic engineering; clonal material reproduced by cuttings, grafting, budding, layering etc.; graft-chimaeras; selections from the wild; ancient selections of crops that date back thousands of years; selections of aberrant growth such as witches brooms; the results of deliberate repeatable single crosses between two pure lines to produce plants of a particular general appearance that is desirable for horticulture, but which are not genetically identical. The question remains as to whether the classification categories of cultivar, Group and grex are the most appropriate and efficient way to deal with this broad range of plant variation.

== See also ==
- Domestication of plants
- Horticultural botany
- List of florilegia and botanical codices
- Citrus taxonomy

== Bibliography ==
- Andrews, Susyn & Leslie, Alan (1999). Alexander, Crinan (ed.). Taxonomy of Cultivated Plants. London: Royal Botanic Gardens Kew. ISBN 978-1-900347-89-1.
- Arber, Agnes (1986). Herbals, Their Origin and Evolution, a Chapter in the History of Botany 1470–1670. Cambridge: Cambridge University Press. ISBN 978-0-521-33879-0. (First published in 1912.)
- Bailey, Liberty Hyde (1918). "The Indigen and Cultigen". Science. Series 2. 47 (1213): 306–308. Bibcode:1918Sci....47..306B. doi:10.1126/science.47.1213.306. PMID 17757815.
- Bailey, Liberty Hyde (1923). "Various Cultigens, and Transfers in Nomenclature". Gentes Herbarum. 1: 113–136.
- Brandenburg, Willem A. (1986). "Classification of cultivated plants". Acta Horticulturae. 182 (182): 109–115. doi:10.17660/ActaHortic.1986.182.13. S2CID 82109893.
- Brickell, Christopher D., ed. (2009). International Code of Nomenclature for Cultivated Plants (ICNCP or Cultivated Plant Code) incorporating the Rules and Recommendations for naming plants in cultivation. 8th edn, adopted by the International Union of Biological Sciences International Commission for the Nomenclature of Cultivated Plants. Scripta Horticulturae. Vol. 10. International Society of Horticultural Science. pp. 1–184. ISBN 978-0-643-09440-6.
- de Candolle, Alphonse (1867). Lois de Nomenclature Botanique. Paris: Masson.
- Heller, John L. (1968). "Linnaeus's Hortus cliffortianus". Taxon. 17 (6): 663–719. Bibcode:1968Taxon..17..663H. doi:10.2307/1218012. JSTOR 1218012.
- Hort, Arthur (1938). The "Critica botanica" of Linnaeus. London: Ray Society.
- Hetterscheid, Wilbert L. A. & Brandenburg, Willem A. (1994), "The Culton Concept: Setting the Stage for an Unambiguous Taxonomy of Cultivated Plants", Acta Horticulturae, 413: 29–34
- Hetterscheid, Wilbert L. A. & Brandenburg, Willem A. (1995), "Culton vs Taxon: Conceptual Issues in Cultivated Plant Systematics", Taxon, 44 (2): 161–175, doi:10.2307/1222439, JSTOR 1222439
- Hetterscheid, Wilbert L. A.; van den Berg, Ronald G. & Brandenburg, Willem A. (1996), "An annotated history of the principles of cultivated plant classification", Acta Botanica Neerlandica, 45 (2): 123–134, Bibcode:1996PlBio..45..123H, doi:10.1111/j.1438-8677.1996.tb00504.x, archived from the original on 29 July 2020
- Jeffrey, Charles (1968). "Systematic Categories for Cultivated Plants". Taxon. 17 (2): 109–114. Bibcode:1968Taxon..17..109J. doi:10.2307/1216498. JSTOR 1216498.
- Jirásek, Václav (1961). "Evolution of the Proposals of Taxonomical Categories for the Classification of Cultivated Plants". Taxon. 10 (2): 34–45. Bibcode:1961Taxon..10...34J. doi:10.2307/1217450. JSTOR 1217450.
- McNeill, John (1998). "Culton: A Useful Term, Questionably Argued". Hortax News. 1: 15–22.
- McNeill, John (2004). "Nomenclature of cultivated plants: a historical botanical standpoint in: C.G. Davidson and P. Trehane (eds), Proc. XXVI IHC – IVth International Symposium on the Taxonomy of Cultivated Plants". Acta Horticulturae. 634 (634): 29–36. doi:10.17660/ActaHortic.2004.634.2.
- McNeill, John (2006). International Code of Botanical Nomenclature (Vienna Code) adopted by the Seventeenth International Botanical Congress Vienna, Austria, July 2005. A. R. G. Ruggell, Liechtenstein: Gantner Verlag.
- McNeill, J.; Barrie, F.R.; Buck, W.R.; Demoulin, V.; Greuter, W.; Hawksworth, D.L.; Herendeen, P.S.; Knapp, S.; Marhold, K.; Prado, J.; Prud'homme Van Reine, W.F.; Smith, G.F.; Wiersema, J.H.; Turland, N.J. (2012). International Code of Nomenclature for algae, fungi, and plants (Melbourne Code) adopted by the Eighteenth International Botanical Congress Melbourne, Australia, July 2011. Vol. Regnum Vegetabile 154. A.R.G. Gantner Verlag KG. ISBN 978-3-87429-425-6. Archived from the original on 4 November 2013.
- McNeill, John (2008). "The Taxonomy of Cultivated Plants". Acta Horticulturae. 799 (799): 21–28. doi:10.17660/ActaHortic.2008.799.1.
- Miller, Philip (1754). The Gardener's Dictionary, with an introduction by W.T. Stearn. Reprint 1969 (abridged). New York: Verlag von J. Cramer.
- Morton, Alan G. (1981). History of Botanical Science: An Account of the Development of Botany from Ancient Times to the Present Day. London: Academic Press. ISBN 978-0-12-508382-9.
- Royal Horticultural Society (1911). "Horticultural Code". Journal of the Royal Horticultural Society. 37: 149–151.
- Spencer, Roger & Cross, Robert (2007), "The Cultigen", Taxon, 56 (3): 938–940, doi:10.2307/25065875, JSTOR 25065875
- Spencer, Roger; Cross, Robert & Lumley, Peter (2007). Plant Names: A Guide to Botanical Nomenclature. Collingwood, Victoria: CSIRO Publishing. ISBN 978-0-643-09440-6.
- Spencer, Roger & Cross, Robert (2008), "The Cultigen", Acta Horticulturae, 799 (799): 163–167, doi:10.17660/ActaHortic.2008.799.23
- Stace, Clive A. (1984). Plant Taxonomy and Biosystematics. London: Edward Arnold. ISBN 978-0-7131-2802-4.
- Stearn, William T. (1965a). "ICNCP - It all started in 1952 or did it? International Code of Nomenclature for Cultivated Plants". Address Given by the Secretary, W T Stearn, of the International Committee on Horticultural Nomenclature and Registration at the Opening Meeting on 7 September 1952. Archived from the original on 18 April 2016.
- Stearn, William T. (1965b). "The origin and later development of cultivated plants". Journal of the Royal Horticultural Society. 90: 279–291, 322–341.
- Stearn, William T. (1986). "Historical survey of the naming of cultivated plants". Acta Horticulturae. 182: 18–28.
- Stearn, William T. (1992). "Historical Introduction". In Huxley, A. (ed. In chief) (ed.). The New Royal Horticultural Society Dictionary of Gardening (4 vols). London: Macmillan. pp. ix–x. ISBN 978-0-333-47494-5.
- Theophrastus (1916). Enquiry into Plants: Books 1-5. Translated by A.F. Hort. Loeb Classical Library. ISBN 978-0-674-99077-7.
- Stuessy, Ted F. (2009). Plant Taxonomy (2nd ed.). New York: Columbia University Press. ISBN 978-0-231-14712-5.
- Trehane, Piers (2004). "50 years of the International Code of Nomenclature for Cultivated Plants: Future prospects for the Code". Acta Horticulturae. 634 (634): 17–27. doi:10.17660/ActaHortic.2004.634.1.
