= Susyn M. Andrews =

British botanist (born 1953)

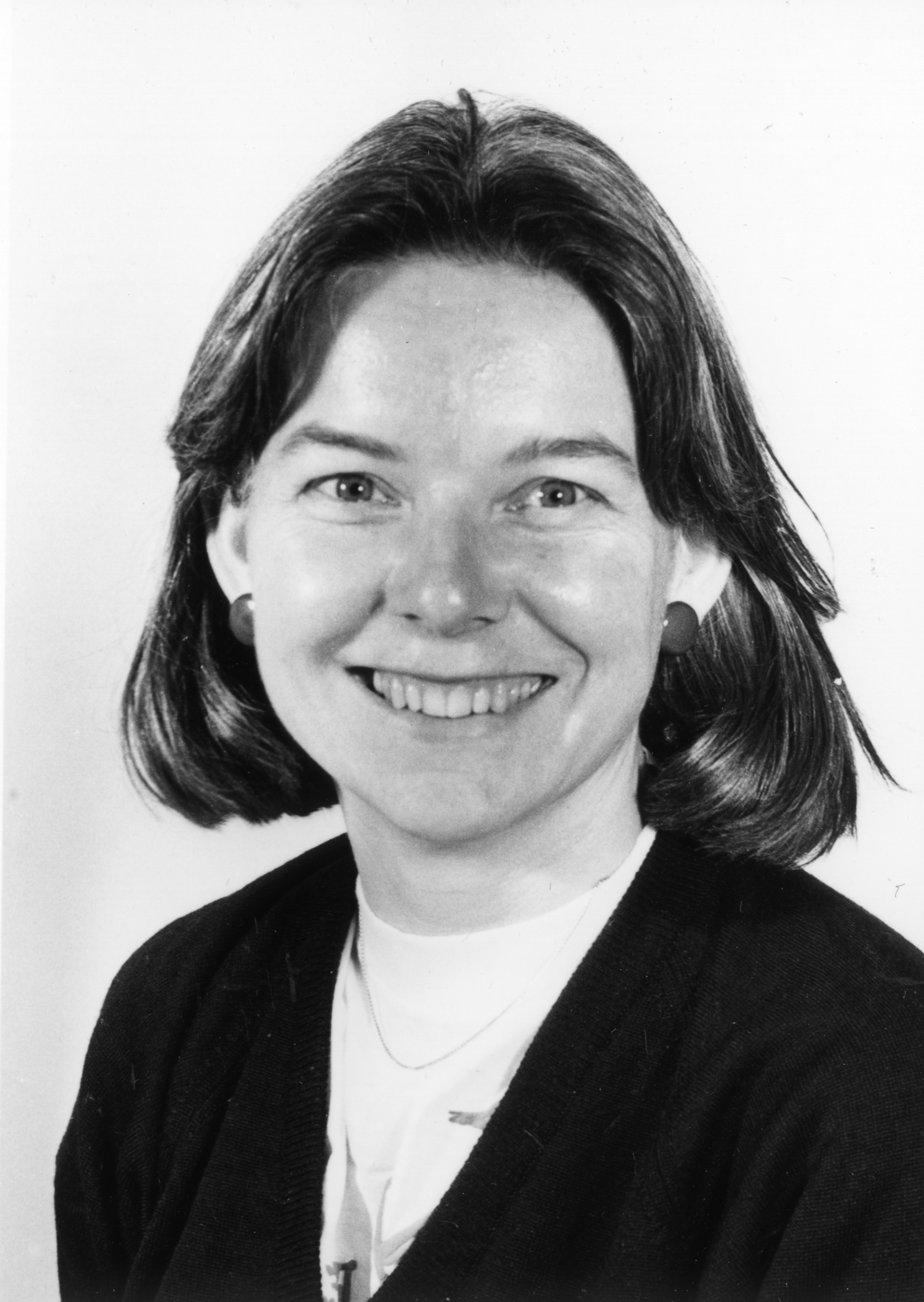
- Born: 1953 (age 72–73)
- Education: National Botanic Garden, Glasnevin
- Occupation: Taxonomic horticulturist

Susyn M. Andrews (born 1953) is a British taxonomic horticulturist. Her research has focussed on temperate and subtropical woody plants, especially Holly and Lavender.

== Life and work ==
Andrews went to school at Rathnew, County Wicklow, Ireland, and studied at the National Botanic Garden, Glasnevin, where she graduated in 1973 with a First Class Honours in Amenity Horticulture and a Silver Medal awarded by the Irish Department of Horticulture. She continued her studies at J.Timm and Co. Pflanzen-Kolle and Johann Bruns Nurseries in Germany and then at the Hillier Arboretum and Nursery in Hampshire. She worked as a horticultural taxonomist at the Herbarium, Kew Gardens, from 1976, initially in the Enquiry Unit, where members of the public could send in plants for identification, becoming Gardens Verifier in 1987. She was promoted to Higher Scientific Officer in 1988 and took part in a collecting expedition to Sabah, Malaysia, concentrating on Ilex. She eventually became head of the Horticultural Taxonomy Unit. In 2003 she left Kew becoming a full time freelance Consultant Horticultural Taxonomist in her own practise, and teaching courses on taxonomy for gardeners.

Andrews has a long-term taxonomic research project into Ilex of Southeast Asia and in cultivation, as well as collaborating on Aquifoliaceae for Kubitzki's Families & Genera of Vascular Plants.

Andrews was co-founder in 1988 and chairman (1988–1998) of (HORTAX), the Horticultural Taxonomy Group, a member of the editorial committee of Curtis's Botanical Magazine, the senior editor of Taxonomy of Cultivated Plants (1999), is an Honorary Research Associate at Kew, and sat on the ISHS Commission for Nomenclature and Registration.

Her work on lavender and holly has been recognised by the Holly Society of America who awarded her the Wolf-Fenton Award (1991) and The Shiu-ying Hu Award (2004). She was awarded the Veitch Memorial Medal by the Royal Horticultural Society (2012), and the George Brown Memorial Award (2016) by the Kew Guild.

== Personal life ==
In 1988 she married Brian Schrire in South Africa.

== Select publications ==
- Molecular phylogeny and historical biogeography of the genus Ilex L. (Aquifoliaceae). Cuenoud, P., Del Pero Martinez, M.A., Loizeau, P.-A., Spichiger, R., Andrews, S. & Manen, J.-F. (1999). Annals of Botany 85(1): 111–122.
- Taxonomy of Cultivated Plants: Third International Symposium. (1999). Andrews, S; A. Leslie; C. Alexander. Kew Publishing, London
- The mountain holly (Nemopanthus mucronatus) revisited with molecular data. Powell, M., Savolainen, V., Cuénoud, P., Manen, J.-F. & Andrews, S. (2000). Kew Bulletin 55(2): 341–147.
- 9. Corchorus. In Beentje, H.J. & Smith, S.A.L. (eds) Flora of Tropical East Africa: Tiliaceae & Muntingiaceae. Andrews, S. (2001). Rotterdam: A.A. Balkema. 101–103.
- Tree of the Year: Nyssa. Andrews, S. (2001). International Dendrology Society Yearbook 2000: 120–158.
- Aquifoliaceae. In Soepadamo, E., Saw, L.G. & Chung, R.C.K. (eds). Andrews, S. (2002). The Tree Flora of Sabah & Sarawak 4: 1–27.
- Systematic relationship of weeping katsura based on nuclear ribosomal DNA sequences. Li, J., Dosmann, M., Del Tredici, P. & Andrews, S. (2002). HortScience 37(3): 595–598.
- The Genus Lavandula. A Botanical Magazine Monograph. Upson, T.M. & Andrews, S. (2004). Kew: Royal Botanic Gardens, Kew. pp 442.
