= Horticultural flora =

Ornamental plant identification aid

A horticultural flora, also known as a garden flora, is a plant identification aid structured in the same way as a native plants Flora. It serves the same purpose: to facilitate plant identification; however, it only includes plants that are under cultivation as ornamental plants growing within the prescribed climate zone or region. Traditionally published in book form, often in several volumes, such floras are increasingly likely to be produced as websites or CD ROMs.

== Scope and contents ==
Horticultural floras include both cultigens (plants deliberately altered in some way by human activity) and those wild plants brought directly into cultivation that do not have cultigen names. They might also include colour images and useful information specific to the zone or region including:

- historical details about outstanding public and private cultivated plant collections
- exceptional trees (age, history, rarity, size etc.)
- prominent nurserymen and plant breeders
- references to the taxonomic and other literature on the plant groups
- easy "spotting" or "field" characters useful for quick identification
- notes on ecology (especially the potential of plants to naturalise and become invasive)
- horticultural history of introduction
- conservation.

== Uses ==
Written by a professional plant taxonomist or plantsperson, a horticultural flora assists clarification of scientific and common names, the identification of plant characteristics that occur in cultivated plants that are additional to those in wild counterparts, and descriptions of cultivars.

Although horticultural floras may include a range of food plants, their emphasis is generally on ornamental plants and so these floras are sometimes referred to as "garden floras". Increasingly they provide data for sustainable landscaping, such as:

- drought tolerance and irrigation needs
- food sources of native and migratory bird and butterfly species
- companion planting
- invasive species notation
- local habitat restoration aspects.

== Published ==
Numerous encyclopedic listings of cultivated plants have been compiled but only four substantial horticultural floras have ever been produced, these being for: North America; Europe; South-eastern Australia, Hawaii and the tropics.

There are several publications on trees which follow the format of botanical keys and descriptions for the trees of a specific region, notably for North America and California.

== See also ==
- Botanical nomenclature
- Cultivated plant taxonomy
- Liberty Hyde Bailey
