= Luther Burbank: His Methods and Discoveries, Their Practical Application =

1914–15 book set

Luther Burbank: His Methods and Discoveries, Their Practical Application is one of the first sets of books published using color photography and is the most-extensive publication of the work of Luther Burbank (1849–1926).

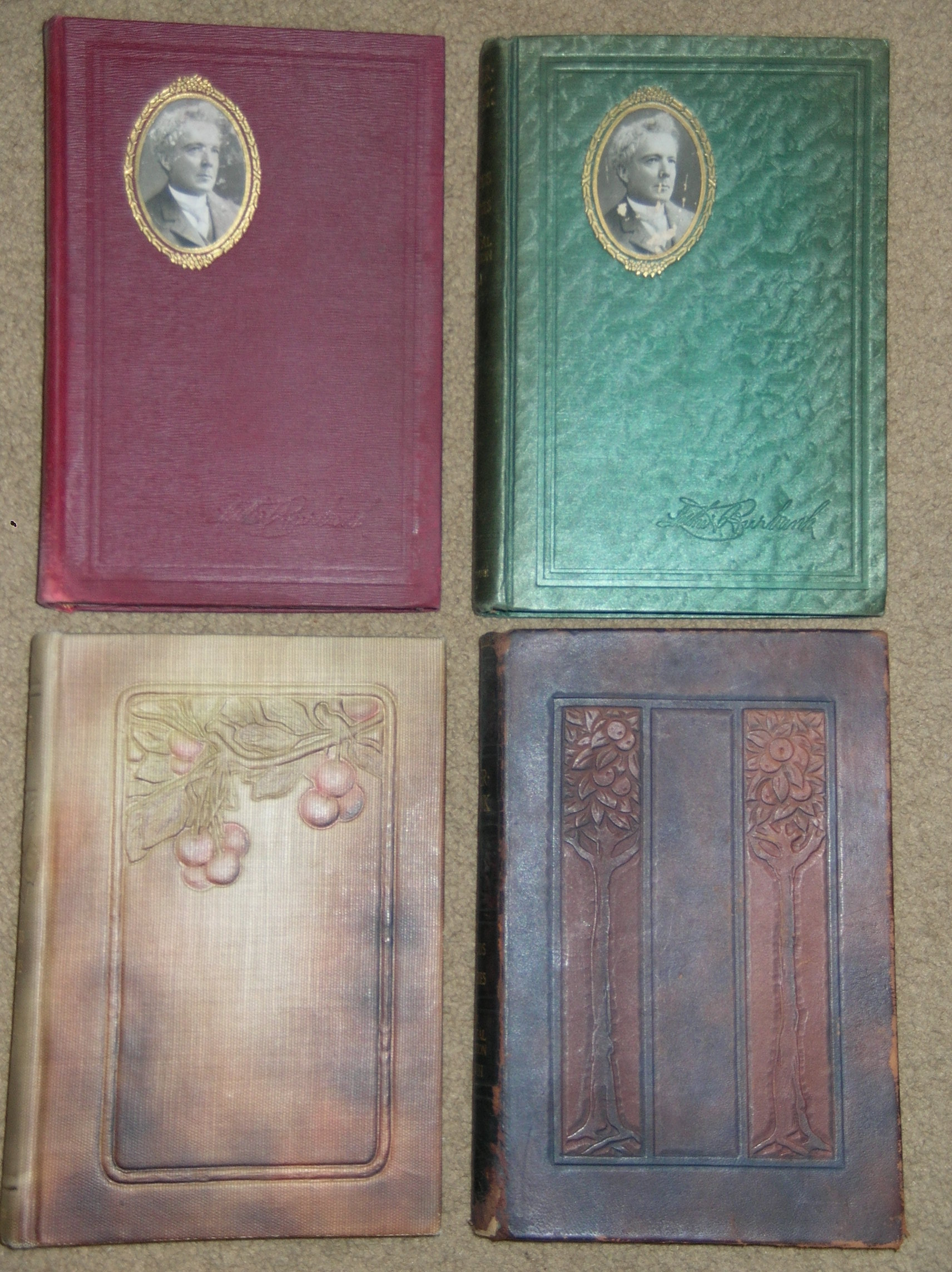
Four bindings of the 12-volume set.

== Luther Burbank history ==
Luther Burbank: His Methods and Discoveries is a twelve-volume set published by the Luther Burbank Press in 1914 and 1915. The set was sold by subscription.

Each volume has 105 color photographs tipped in, for a total of 1260 photographs. The photos provide an extensive record of Burbank’s work in Santa Rosa and Sebastopol from 1875 to 1914.

The books apparently had at least six writers including Oscan Binner, Edward J. Wickson and Henry Smith Williams, M.D., LL.D. George Shull reported of an early draft that “considerable sections are almost word for word the same as my manuscript” implying his notes were included without attribution. Shull bitterly compared the text to his edition: "It appears to me a criminal waste of good paper … it remains to be seen if I can do any better … The colored plates will prove both interesting and valuable." Per biographer Peter Dreyer: “As Burbank had told Shull early in 1907, the ten volumes—now expanded to twelve—would not contain as much ‘meat’ as ten pages of the Carnegie report.”. The Carnegie report was never published.

== Production ==
Sold by subscription, four quality levels of binding were offered: simple cloth, suede, embossed cloth and leather.

The simple-cloth-bound edition was offered in multiple colors: red, blue, green and gold. Each volume has a black & white photo of Burbank inserted in the front of each cover. The books sold for $180 per set, “when $180 represented the earnings of two months’ work or longer.”

In the same format as the simple-cloth-bound edition, a suede leather version was offered. The leather was light in weight and not nearly as sturdy as the full leather editions, below.

The embossed-cloth edition has a cherry design.

The leather-bound edition has a two-tree design with tall trees in panels separated by a blank panel on the front covers. The first volume is endorsed to its buyer and has an original signature of Luther Burbank.

An unusual leather-bound edition with a path scene with stone posts, a gate and trees on along the paths the covers was used for presentation purposes. These sets do not have the Luther Burbank signature.

Another unusual leather-bound edition has a grape vine with grapes on a T-trellis on the covers. These have very heavy (wood?) boards.

Special paper was prepared for the volumes which was watermarked “The Luther Burbank Press.”

== Color photography ==
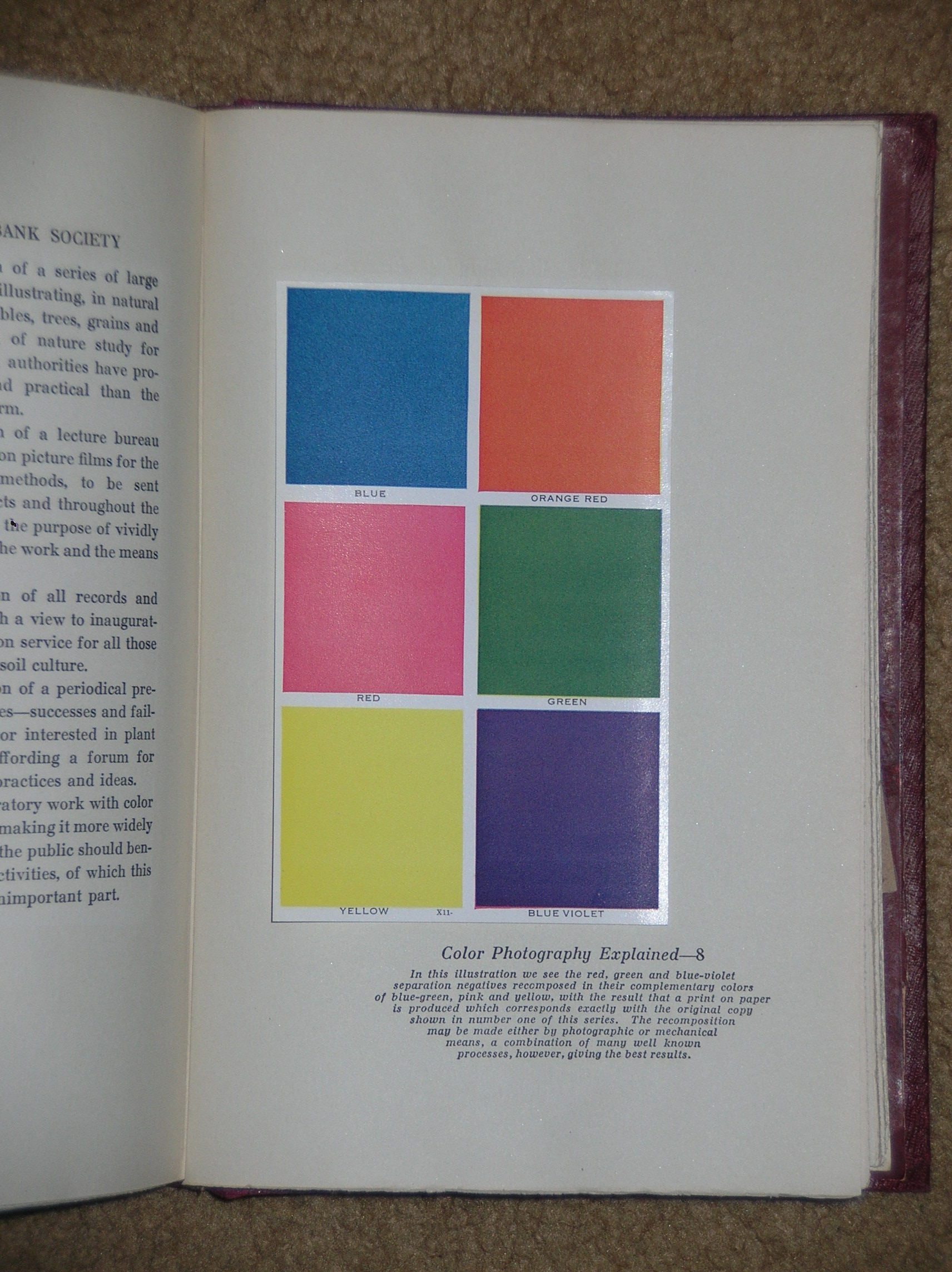
Number 8 of 9 photographs explaining how color photography works.

The volumes are one of the first uses of color photography and color printing. Since a nationwide search failed to find suitable color printing technology, The Luther Burbank Press set up a photo-chemical laboratory using the process of Lumiere of Paris. The last volume has a section which describes how color photography and color printing is accomplished.

== Chapters ==
The twelve volumes are

'Volume I (1914)

1. How the Cactus Got Its Spines – And How It Lost Them
2. Twenty-three Potato Seeds – And What They Taught
3. No Two Living Things Exactly Alike
4. The Rivalry of Plants To Please Us
5. Let Us Now Produce a New Pink Daisy
6. Short-Cuts Into Centuries to Come
7. How Far Can Plant Improvement Go?
8. Some Plants Which Are Begging for Immediate Improvement
9. Piecing the Fragments of a Motion Picture Film

Volume IV (1914)

1. Quick Possibilities in Fruit Improvement
2. Practical Orchard Plans and Methods
3. Doubling the Productiveness of the Cherry
4. The Responsiveness of the Pear
5. Fuzzy Peach and Smooth-Skinned Nectarine
6. The Apple – A Fruit Worthy of Still Further Improvement
7. The Transformation of the Quince
8. The Apricot and the Loquat
9. Citrus Fruits – And Fruits From the Tropics

Volume VII (1914)

1. How to Get the Most Out of the Garden
2. Some Common Garden Plants and Their Improvement
3. Peas and Beans as Money Crops
4. The Tomato – and an Interesting Experiment
5. Pink Chives – and Other Foods for Flavor
6. Artichokes – and Some Garden Specialties
7. Winter Rhubarb – and Other Interesting Exotics
8. The Camassia – Will it Supplant the Potato?
9. The Potato Itself – Who Will Improve It Further?

Volume X (1915)

1. Getting the Utmost Variation Out of A Flower
2. Improvement in the Much Improved Iris
3. The Tigridia and Some Interesting Hybrids
4. Four Common Dooryard Flowers – And Their Improvements
5. The Everlasting Flower, and Some Common Exotica
6. The Hybrid Larkspur – and Other Transformations
7. Ornamental Palms and Climbing Vines
8. Laws and Their Beautification
9. Field and Flower Garden

Volume II (1914)

1. The Shasta Daisy
2. The White Blackberry
3. The Scented Calla
4. The Stoneless Plum
5. The Royal Walnut
6. The Winter Rhubarb
7. The Burbank Cherry
8. The Sugar Prune
9. Some Interesting Failures

Volume V (1914)

1. How the Plum Followed the Potato
2. Four Burbank Plums, and How They Were Made
3. The Greatest Plum of All – The Prune
4. Four Burbank Prunes, and The Work Behind Them
5. Plums and Prunes Without Stones and Seeds
6. Planning and Ideal Plum or Prune
7. New Plums and Prunes in The Process of Making
8. What the Burbank Plums and Prunes Have Earned
9. Accomplishing the Impossible – The Plumcot

Volume VIII (1914)

1. Corn – The King of America’s Crops
2. Getting the Most Out of the Small Grains
3. Manufacturing Food for the Live Stock
4. A Rich Field for Work on the Textile Plants
5. Plants Which Yield Useful Chemical Substances
6. Reclaiming the Deserts with Cactus
7. Rival of Alfalfa
8. Many Useful Substances in Cactus
9. Other Useful Plants Which Will Repay Experiment

Volume XI (1915)

1. Nuts as a Profitable Crop
2. The Paper Shell, and Other Walnuts
3. The Almond – and Its Improvement
4. The Chestnut – Bearing Nuts at Six Months
5. The Hickory Nut, and Other Nuts
6. The On Growing Trees for Lumber
7. The Production of a Quick-growing Walnut
8. Trees Whose Products are Useful Substances
9. Trees and Shrubs for Shade and Ornamentals

Volume III (1914)

1. Planning A New Plant
2. Plant Affinities
3. Practical Pollination
4. Quantity Production
5. Grafting and Budding
6. Letting the Bees Do Their Work
7. Fixing Good Traits
8. Recording the Experiments
9. Final Selection

Volume VI (1914)

1. The Thornless Blackberry – And Others
2. The Raspberry and Some Odd Crosses
3. Designing a Strawberry to Bear the Year Around
4. The Sunberry – A Production from the Wild
5. A Dozen Other Delightful Berries
6. Great Opportunities In the Grape
7. The Cactus Pear – A Profitable Fruit
8. Some Inedible Fruits Which May Be Transformed
9. The Need for Improving Small Fruits

Volume IX (1914)

1. What to Work for in Flowers
2. Working With a Universal Flower – The Rose
3. Accomplishing the Impossible With the Amaryllis
4. Bringing Forth an Entirely New Color
5. A Daisy Which Rivals the Chrysanthemum
6. Making the Gladiolus Surpass Itself
7. Experimenting With the Responsive Dahlia
8. The Canna and the Calia
9. The Purest White in Nature

Volume XII (1915)

1. Luther Burbank – His Boyhood on a Massachusetts Farm
2. Luther Burbank – The Early Years in Santa Rosa
3. Luther Burbank – His Patience Rewarded
4. Luther Burbank – The Sum of His Work With Plant Life
5. Luther Burbank – The Bearing of His Work on Human Life
6. The Luther Burbank Society

(includes explanation of color photography)

== How Plants are Trained to Work for Man ==
How Plants are Trained to Work for Man by Luther Burbank, Sc.D published in 1921 is clearly a rework of the 1914–1915 work.

The 1921 publication is in eight volumes in a single binding. Each volume contains 49 photographs printed on separate pages, not the tipped-in photos of the original.

Despite Burbank's claim that, "these eight volumes are not a compilation from the works or words of others," the books cite the copyrights from 1914 and 1915 from the Luther Burbank Company.

All but two of the photographs in the 1921 volumes came from the 1914–1915 volumes. Generally, photographs in the first volumes of the early set are found in the first volumes of the later set, with this trend continuing to the last volumes.

The "Sc.D" is from the honorary doctor of science degree awarded Burbank by Tufts University in 1905.
