= Peacotum =

Fruit hybrid

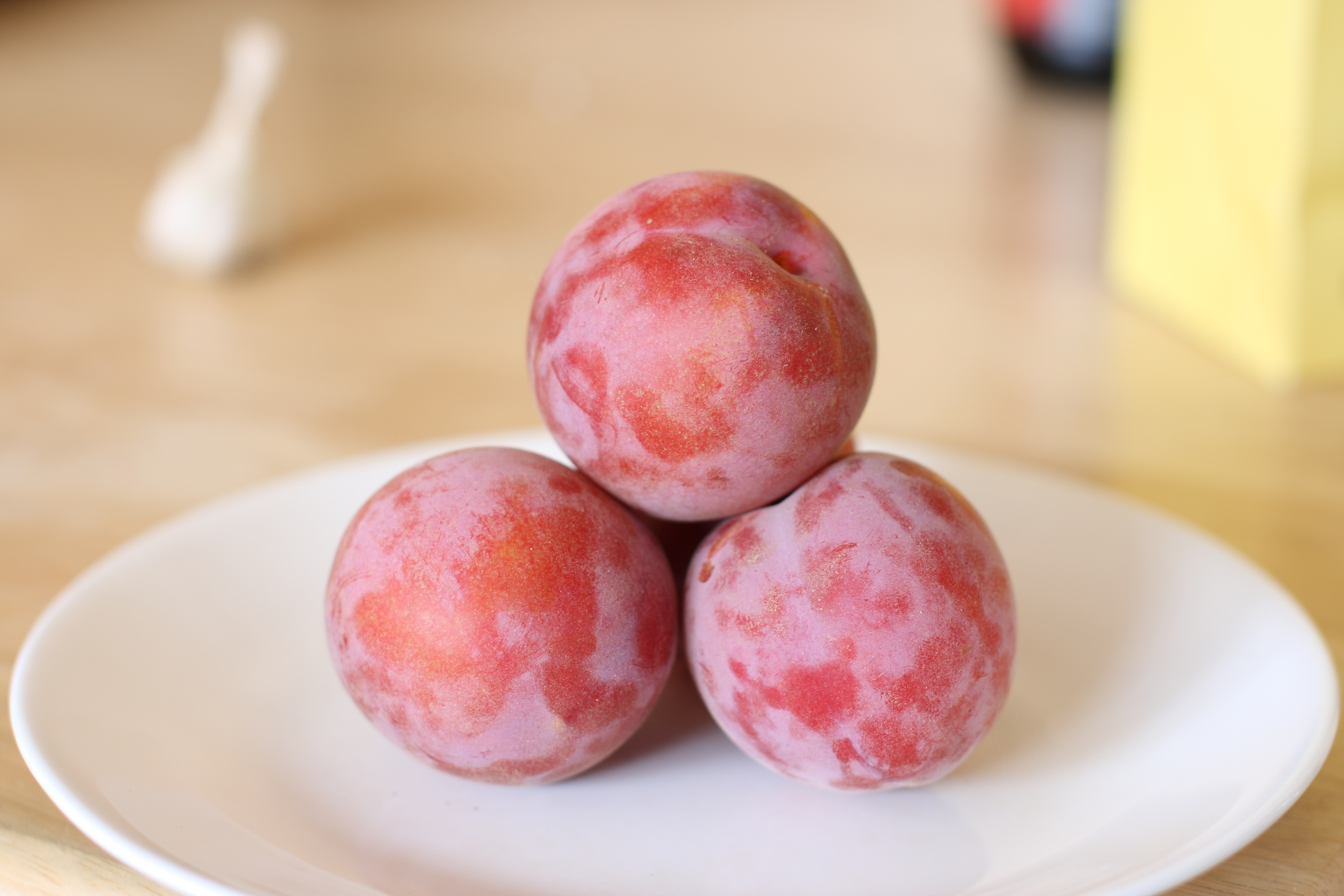
Peacotums

A peacotum is a peach/apricot/plum hybrid developed by Zaiger's Genetics, Inc., a company that develops novel fruit through hybridization. Peacotum is trademarked by Dave Wilson Nursery Inc. An application to trademark the name nectacotum in the United States for varieties derived from nectarine-type peaches was made in 2004 but later abandoned.

== See also ==
- Nectaplum
- Pluot
