= Nectaplum =

Hybrid Fruit

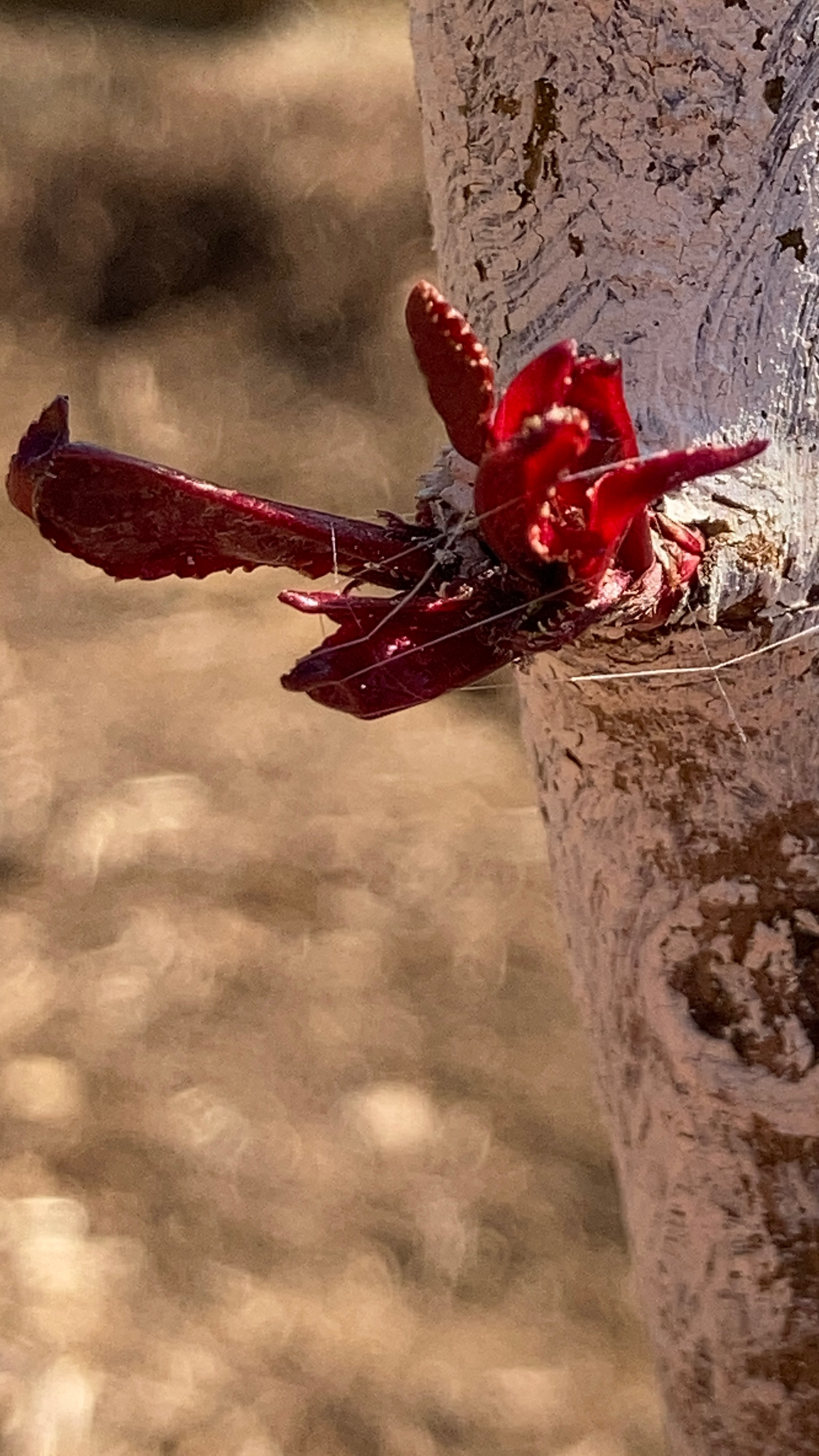
Nectaplum showing noticeable purple growth.

A nectaplum (interspecific nectarine) is a tradename for varieties that are a hybrid of nectarines and plums developed by Floyd Zaiger. Both nectarine and plum traits are easily detectable. It sprouts from an ornamental tree which makes it popular for home gardening, but is not large in the commercial market.

The fruit's exterior has smooth skin closely resembling a nectarine. Nectaplums are noted for their sweetness (due to a very high sugar content) and their intense flavor.

== Varieties ==
There is currently only one marketed variety of this type of fruit.

- Spice Zee - Slightly acidic, loaded with sugar. White flesh, and reddish-grey skin. Harvests in middle to late July.

== See also ==
- Peacotum
- Plumcot, Apriplum, Pluot, or Aprium
