= Whiteberry =

Whiteberry may refer to:

- Actaea pachypoda, a species of flowering plant known as white-berry snakeroot, or simply whiteberry
- White blackberry, a white blackberry variant
- Whiteberry (music group), a Japanese pop rock group

== See also ==
- Cornus sericea, known as white-berry dogwood
- Pseudotaxus, known as whiteberry yew
