= Luther Burbank's Gold Ridge Experiment Farm =

- Gold Ridge Farm
- U.S. National Register of Historic Places
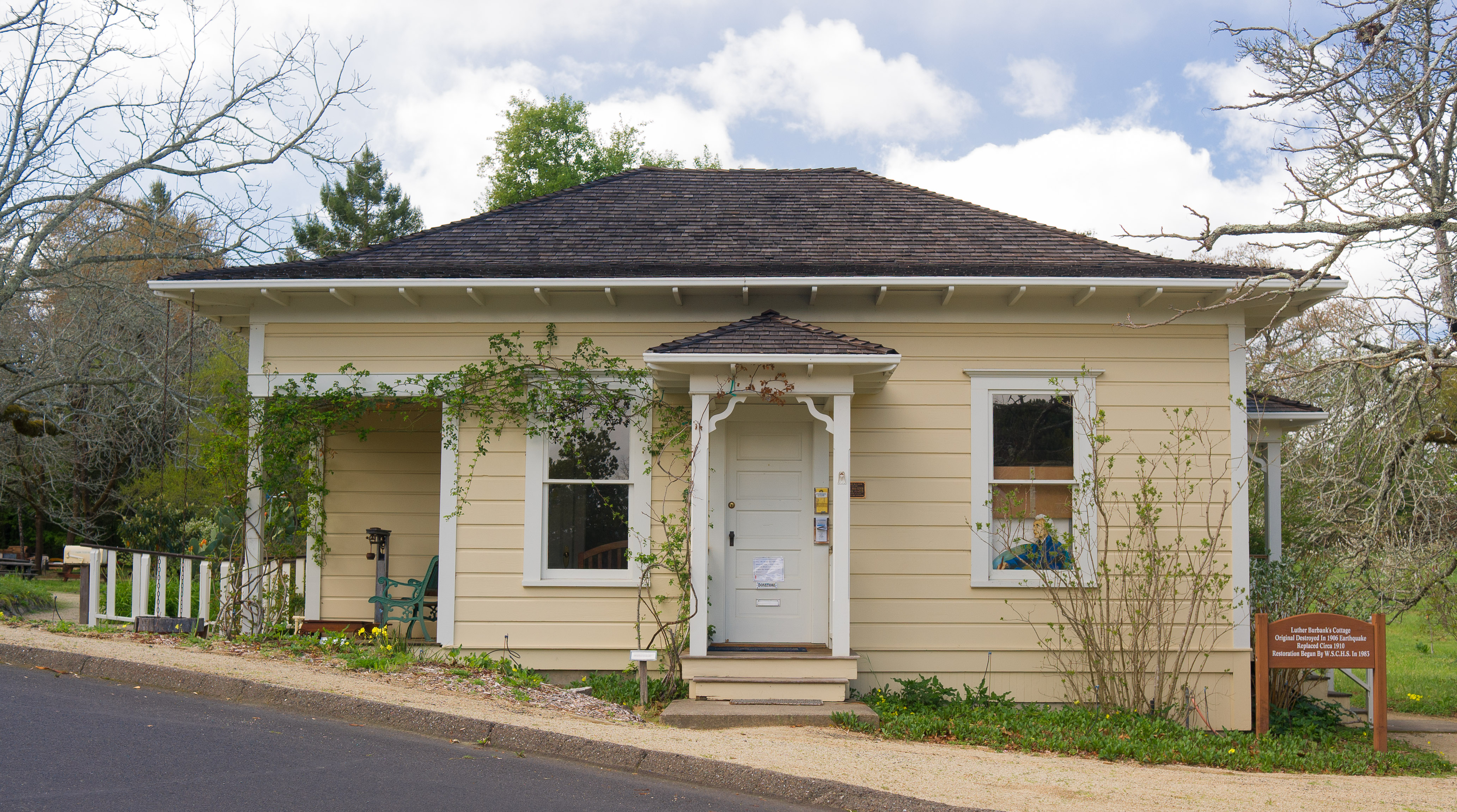
- the Caretaker's Cottage in 2012

- Location within California Location within the United States
- Nearest city: Sebastopol, California
- Coordinates: 38°23′48″N 122°50′5″W
- NRHP reference No.: 78000803
- Added to NRHP: December 14, 1978

Luther Burbank's Gold Ridge Experiment Farm is the official name of the 3 acres (12,000 m^{2}) that remain of the farm originally purchased in 1885 by famed plant breeder Luther Burbank (1849–1926) in an area of Sebastopol, California, formerly known as the "Gold Ridge District". To these 10 acres (40,000 m^{2}), Burbank added 5 acres (20,000 m^{2}) in 1904 and 3.046 acres (12,330 m^{2}) in 1906 until, in 1923, failing health compelled him to sell 3.046 acres (12,330 m^{2}) of his holdings. Burbank died in 1926.

In 1974, Burbank's widow Elizabeth Waters Burbank (1888–1977) donated the remaining 15 acres (61,000 m^{2}) to the Sebastopol Area Housing Corporation for the purpose of erecting low-income, senior, and disabled housing units with the stipulation that the 3-acre (12,000 m^{2}) parcel containing the "Caretaker's Cottage" (also known as the foreman's cottage that had been constructed in a simple Queen Anne style one to three years after an older cottage on the property was destroyed by the 1906 earthquake), the barn, the potting shed (destroyed by fire in the late 1960s) and over 250 living specimens of Burbank's work be set aside and left undisturbed as a historical and horticultural area, dedicated to Burbank, to be studied and enjoyed by future generations. Presently owned by the City of Sebastopol, it is administrated by the Western Sonoma County Historical Society and maintained entirely by volunteers.

== History of Gold Ridge Farm ==
Luther Burbank on the steps of the original cabin at his experimental farm in Sebastopol, California, 1901.

Faced with the need for more room in which to conduct his experiments in perennial plants, trees and shrubs than could be accommodated by his nursery at his home and gardens in Santa Rosa, Burbank purchased Gold Ridge Farm chiefly because of its subtle variations in environments, exposures and elevations. This allowed him to conduct experiments on plants that varied greatly in characteristics. In its heyday, some estimates put the number of Burbank's on-going plant experiments at Gold Ridge Farm at over 60,000 and tended by a crew of as many as 15 to 20 workers.

After Burbank's death in 1926, the remaining extant Burbank plants were cataloged by representatives from Stark Brothers Nursery in Missouri (an influential former client of Burbank's) after which the farm fell into disuse and disrepair until the mid-1970s.

The Western Sonoma County Historical Society was formed in Sebastopol at that time from the ranks of local volunteers with the original mission of assuring the preservation and maintenance of Burbank's Gold Ridge Farm. This mission has expanded to include the West Sonoma County Museum (headquartered at the old train depot building in downtown Sebastopol), the Sebastopol Archives and the Triggs Reference Room and genealogical archives.

Today, Luther Burbank's Gold Ridge Experiment Farm is a horticultural and historical museum where the public can, by docent or self-guided tour, view literally hundreds of the "living legacies" of the man once called "The Plant Wizard".

== Location ==
Gold Ridge Farm is located at 7777 Bodega Avenue (about 1 mile (1.6 km) west of Main Street) in Sebastopol and is open to the public. The Western Sonoma County Historical Society and the West County Museum are located at 261 South Main Street in Sebastopol.

== See also ==
- Luther Burbank Home and Gardens
