= Ira J. Condit =

American horticulturist

- Born: November 18, 1883; Jersey, Ohio
- Died: 1981 (aged 97–98)
- Spouse: Caroline Callender

Ira Judson Condit (1883–1981) was an American horticulturist who studied subtropical fruits, including the fig, the olive, and the avocado.

== Early life and education ==
Ira J. Condit was born November 18, 1883, in Jersey, Ohio, and graduated from Granville High School in 1900. He went on to Ohio State University, where he received his B.S. in 1905. After more than a decade working in various horticulture-related jobs, he returned to school, earning an M.S. from the University of California (1928) and a Ph.D. from Stanford University (1932).

== Career ==
After leaving college Condit spent a year in Washington, D.C., at the Division of Entomology in the U.S. Department of Agriculture. Between 1907 and 1912, he was an instructor in horticulture at California Polytechnic School, San Luis Obispo. While teaching at the polytechnic, he met Caroline Callender, and they married in June 1912.

In 1913, he moved to Berkeley, California, where he joined the College of Agriculture as an assistant professor in citriculture. He began to study subtropical fruit, subsequently publishing research reports on cultivation of the avocado (1915), carob (1919), oriental persimmon (1919), and loquat (1915). He kept track of avocado cultivars in the state, and these efforts, together with his avocado report, were instrumental in helping to establish the economically important California avocado industry. For many years he also investigated problems arising from olive culture in California.

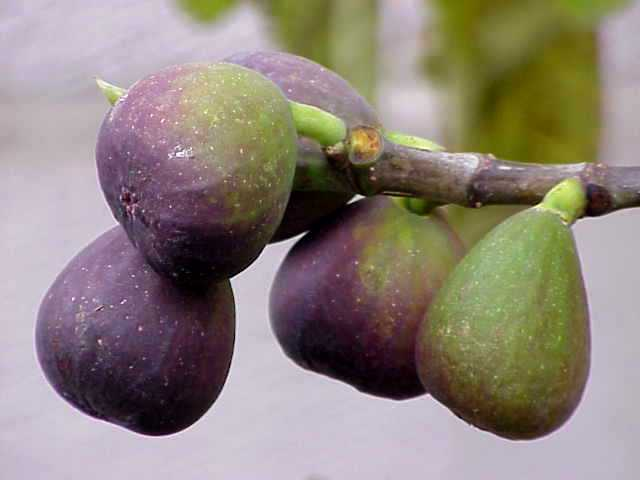
The edible fig was one of the important objects of Ira Condit's research.

Condit is best known today for his work on the large genus Ficus, which includes the edible fig. He wrote early reports on caprifigs (so-called inedible figs), the Kadota fig, and general fig culture. After World War I, Condit took a job as horticulturist for the planned J.C. Forkner Fig Gardens, a combination fig ranch and real-estate development project in Fresno, California, that collapsed in the Great Depression. He later served for four years as horticulturist to the California Peach and Fig Growers Association. In 1923, the growers association sent him to Europe to learn about the fig industries of Algeria, Italy, Greece, Turkey, France, Spain and Portugal.

In 1935, Condit joined the University of California Citrus Experiment Station in Riverside as Associate Professor and Associate Subtropical Horticulturist. He remained there for many years studying the morphology of the fig flower, fig nomenclature and climatic adaptation, and fig breeding, and he wrote cytological studies of over 30 Ficus species. Among those he studied were Ficus carica (the edible fig), F. benjamina (weeping fig) and F. elastica (rubber plant). In 1947 he published The Fig, his comprehensive monograph on the subject.

In 1934-35, Condit was visiting professor at Lingnan University in Canton, China, and also visited the Philippines, Formosa, Japan, and Hawaii. He served as the editor of the Subtropical and Tropical Pomology section of Biological Abstracts, and he was a member of the American Association for the Advancement of Science, the American Society of Horticultural Science, and the California Botanical Society.

Condit retired from UC Riverside in 1951 and died in Santa Barbara, California in 1981 at the age of 97. A collection of his papers is held by the Riverside Public Library.

== Selected publications ==
- Ficus: The Exotic Species. University of California, Division of Agricultural Sciences, 1969.
- Fig-Varieties. University of California, 1955.
- The Fig. Chronica Botanica Co., 1947.
- Caprifigs and Caprification. University of California Press, 1922.
- The Loquat. University of California Press, 1915.
