= Floyd Zaiger =

American fruit breeder (1926–2020)

- Born: April 26, 1926; Kennard, Nebraska
- Died: June 2, 2020 (aged 94); Modesto, California
- Education: UC Davis
- Scientific career
- Fields: Biology, pomology, fruit hybridizing
- Workplaces: Zaiger's Genetics

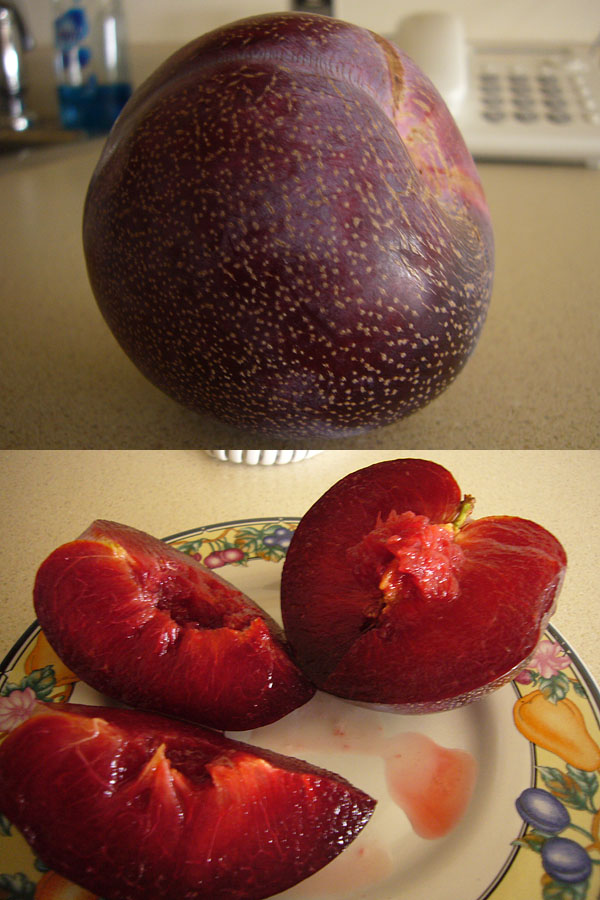
A pluot

Chris "Floyd" Zaiger (April 26, 1926 – June 2, 2020) was an American fruit breeder particularly known for hybrid development of stone fruit and numerous plant patents. Zaiger founded Zaiger's Genetics, a fruit-breeding business in Modesto, California, which is now an international business selling cultivars and hybrids. Zaiger developed varieties such as the pluot, and has been called "the most prolific stone fruit breeder in the modern era."

== Early life and education ==
Chris Floyd Zaiger was born to Christian Fredrick Zaiger and Anna Marie Zaiger on April 26, 1926, in Kennard, Nebraska. The family moved to Iowa and then Oregon, before coming to California's San Joaquin Valley. He attended school until eighth grade and worked as a migrant strawberry picker. During World War II, he was drafted into the U.S. Army where he served as a paratrooper in the 11th Airborne Division. Zaiger earned a degree in plant pathology and agricultural education in 1952 from the University of California, Davis. He taught agriculture classes at Modesto city high schools, Livingston High School, and Modesto Junior College.

== Career ==
In 1954, Zaiger and wife Betty purchased a 2.5 acre nursery and began breeding heat-tolerant azaleas as a hobby. In 1956 and 1957, he apprenticed with breeder Fred Anderson, a protege of Luther Burbank and developer of the nectarine. While the Zaiger family continued to operate an ornamental nursery until 1990, Zaiger and family are better known for fruit variety development. The family-owned company Zaiger Genetics cross-pollinates by hand, rather than gene-splicing or DNA manipulation, to develop new hybrids. As of 2020, they have patented 446 plant varieties.

Zaiger's first patented varieties were the Royal Gold peach, introduced in 1965, and ‘Crimson Gold’ nectarine. He revolutionized the plum industry by backcrossing plum-apricot hybrids with plums to create the Pluot. His work has also reduced the chill-hours needed for fruits like cherries which allow them to be grown in warmer climates and produced peaches and nectarines that are sweet, yet firm allowing for intercontinental shipping. Another invention, the 'Independence' almond is self-fertile allowing pollination without the use of honeybees needed for other almond varieties. He created the aprium, a hybrid cross between apricots and plums but more similar to apricots.

== Personal life ==
Zaiger married Betty Jean Taylor in 1950 and they had three children Leith, Gary, and Grant. Zaiger died at his home in Modesto, California on June 2, 2020.

== Awards and recognition ==
- 1995 Wilder Award from the American Pomological Society for "distinguished service and contributions to the advancement of pomological science and for outstanding fruit varieties"
- 1997 Awarded rank of Officier, Ordre du Mérite Agricole
- 1999 Alumni Award of Distinction award from UC Davis College of Agricultural and Environmental Sciences
