= J.C. Forkner Fig Gardens =

Real estate development in Fresno, California

The J.C. Forkner Fig Gardens (1883–1981) was an early 20th-century real estate development in Fresno, California, United States, that combined home ownership with fig farming.

== History ==
In 1912, real estate developer Jesse Clayton "J.C." Forkner, a transplant from Kansas, envisioned in California's San Joaquin Valley the creation of a development where homeowners would each have enough land for a small but profitable orchard. He got a one-year option to purchase 6,000 acres (2,400 ha) of undesirable land from the Bullard Company in what is now northwest Fresno, between the city center and the San Joaquin River.

Forkner consulted with several California experts about the possibility of fig farming, including the University of California, Berkeley, professor Edward J. Wickson, and local fig grower Henry Markarian. He later hired another UC professor, Ira J. Condit, as a project horticulturist. Forkner expanded his holdings to 12,000 acres (4,900 hectares) and began preparing the land for his "Fig Gardens." The ambitious scale of the project can be seen in the fact that the development encompassed a streetcar line, over 120 miles (190 km) of streets, and an irrigation system with a 25-mile (40 km)-long main canal and some 135 miles (217 km) of side ditches. To move ahead rapidly, Forkner assembled a mix of horse-drawn Fresno scrapers and over 100 Ford tractors, at one point owning more Ford tractors than anyone else in the world.

Planting the figs required blasting holes with dynamite through a top layer of hardpan to reach the underlying soil. Forkner eventually planted some 600,000 fig trees, of which 9 in 10 were edible figs and the remainder ornamental figs. The figs came out of an adjacent nursery stocked in part with cuttings obtained from Markarian, and landowners were permitted to choose among different varieties. The majority of trees planted were Calimyrna figs, with significant acreage also devoted to Kadotas. By 1920, some 500 families were living in the development on individual fig farms averaging 16 acres (6.5 ha) apiece. Despite this early success, the Fig Gardens project collapsed when J.C. Forkner went bankrupt during the Great Depression.

The development was named the "J.C. Forkner Fig Gardens" in early promotional literature, and in 1919 Forkner published a pamphlet entitled The J.C. Forkner Fig Gardens Recipes: How to Serve Figs in the Home. That same year, Forkner and local businessman Wylie M. Giffen subdivided the section of land nearest to Fresno into smaller one-acre and half-acre plots. The Forkner-Giffen section was renamed Old Fig Garden, and it survives today as a census-designated place entirely surrounded by the city of Fresno. Other acreage from the original project has been merged into other sections of Fresno, including the unincorporated community of Figarden.
