= Dave Wilson Nursery =

Dave Wilson Nursery is a family-owned and operated nursery that specializes in the wholesale growth of fruit trees for home gardens. It was established in 1938 and based in Modesto, California, and has become one of the largest growers of deciduous fruit, nut, and shade trees in the United States, cultivating over 1000 acres on a four-year rotation and producing more than two million trees annually.

The nursery is known for being a significant licensee and propagator of new fruit varieties developed by Zaiger's Genetics, including the Pluot and the Aprium.
