= Edward J. Wickson =

American entomologist

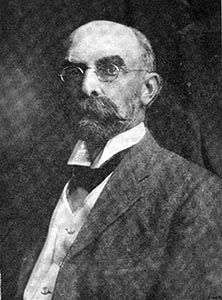
- Born: August 3, 1848; Rochester, New York
- Died: July 17, 1923 (aged 74); Berkeley, California
- Scientific career
- Fields: agronomy, horticulture, agricultural journalism
- Workplaces: University of California, Berkeley

Edward James Wickson (August 3, 1848 – July 17, 1923) was an American agronomist and journalist who was a leader in agricultural education in California in the late 19th and early 20th centuries. Edward was the son of George Guest and Kitty Ray Wickson, the grandson of James and Jane Tuesman Wickson, immigrants to Canada in 1834.

== Biography ==
Edward James Wickson was born on August 3, 1848, in Rochester, New York. He graduated from Hamilton College, New York, in 1868 or 1869 with distinction in classics and chemistry. After graduation, he joined his father's agricultural tools factory, but it was destroyed by fire in 1870, ruining the family's finances. In 1871, he joined the staff of the Utica Morning Herald, a champion of the state's cheese industry. This position led to his election as the secretary of the New York Dairymen's Association (1871) and as president of the Utica Dairymen's Board of Trade (1873). His expertise in matters pertaining to the dairy industry was such that in 1874 and 1875 he was chosen to speak to state dairymen's conventions from New England to the Midwest.

In 1875, Wickson moved to California to join the Pacific Rural Press (which later merged with California Farmer magazine). He became a special contributor in 1894 and was promoted to editor in 1899, a position he held until 1923. During his tenure at Pacific Rural Press, he wrote widely on the agricultural topics of the day and published several encyclopedic books on growing fruit and vegetable crops that remain useful resources for farmers. He also wrote on historical topics, such as the roots of the state's agriculture in the Spanish mission system, and he wrote various bulletins for the U.S. Department of Agriculture.

Wickson married Edna Harmon in 1875 at Washington College in Irvington (now a district of Fremont, CA).

Wickson was an advocate for the experimental horticulturist Luther Burbank and wrote about him in Luther Burbank; Man, Methods and Achievements, published in book form in 1902. They had both come to California in 1875, and they knew of each other very soon thereafter. By the 1880s, Wickson was praising Burbank's hybrids in the pages of Pacific Rural Press, so much so that Burbank renamed his green Perfection plum to the Wickson plum in 1894. Wickson is credited with being one of the two men (the other being former Stanford University president David Starr Jordan) who helped created the legend of Burbank as one of the great self-taught leaders of modern agricultural science. Wickson is also said to be one of the half dozen authors who anonymously wrote the text for the 12-volume set Luther Burbank: His Methods and Discoveries, published by the Luther Burbank Press in 1914–15.

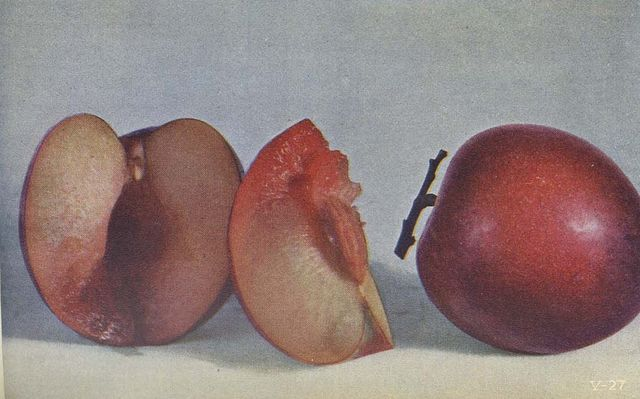
Originally named the Perfection, this 1883 plum variety was subsequently rechristened the Wickson in honor of Edward J. Wickson. Its ancestors were the Kelsey and the Burbank. The Wickson plum remains available today, although modern cultivars range from red-skinned to green-skinned.

In 1876, Wickson organized California's first dairy association, and in 1879 he became one of the organizers of the California State Horticultural Society. He was elected secretary of the horticultural society, a position he held for 15 years. At the founding of the California Floral Society in 1888, Wickson was chosen as its first president; when he stepped down, he retained the title of honorary president.

In 1879, he joined the University of California as a lecturer in practical agriculture, specializing in dairy husbandry. All told, he worked in the UC system for 33 years, rising from lecturer to assistant professor of agriculture (in 1891), associate professor of agriculture, horticulture, and entomology (in 1892), professor of agricultural practice (in 1897) and superintendent of the Agricultural Extension service (in 1898). In 1906 he succeeded Eugene W. Hilgard as dean of the College of Agriculture, and he also became director of the Agricultural Experiment Station, holding both positions until his retirement in 1912. He was also an emeritus professor of horticulture from 1915 to 1923. In 1905–06, he helped to select the sites for what became the University Farm at Davisville (now Davis), the Southern California Pathological Laboratory at Whittier, and the Citrus Experiment Station at Riverside. Throughout his career in both agricultural publishing and education, he retained a strong bias towards knowledge gained in the field over laboratory-oriented forms of training. At the same time, he and Hilgard are credited as halting determined efforts by the Grange and other agricultural interests that would have split the College of Agriculture off from the University of California system.

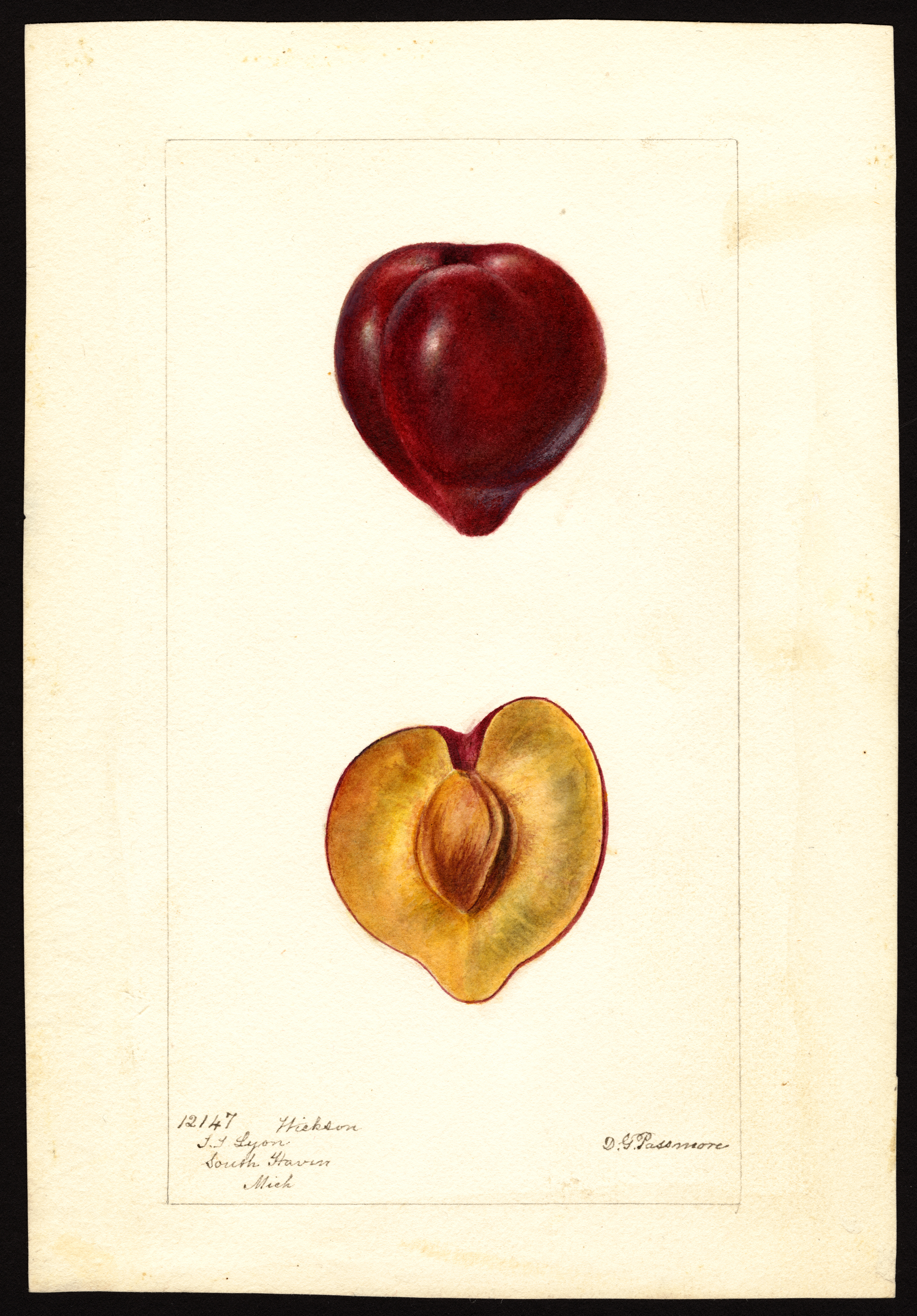
Watercolor of the Wickson Plum by Deborah Griscom Passmore, 1896

From 1877 to 1906, he was a member (and later secretary and president) of the San Francisco Microscopical Society, an organization that championed the emerging use of microscopy for scientific research. The society went defunct after its laboratory was destroyed in the 1906 earthquake.

In 1913, Wickson spent six months in Europe as one of two California delegates on the American Commission to Study Agricultural Cooperation and Rural Credit in Europe.

Around 1919, Wickson consulted with real estate developer J.C. Forkner (eventual founder of the J.C. Forkner Fig Gardens) on the potential of fig farming as a viable commercial enterprise in California.

He died in Berkeley, California, on July 17, 1923. His papers are held in the University of California, Davis, Special Collections.

In 1969, the University of California, Berkeley, named an area of the campus around the north fork of Strawberry Creek as the Wickson Natural Area in his honor. This area contains the oldest stand of coast redwoods on the Berkeley campus.

== Plant species named after Wickson ==
- Wickson plum (developed by Luther Burbank, introduced as the Perfection in 1883 and renamed the Wickson in 1884)
- Wickson crabapple (developed by Albert Etter and introduced in 1944)

== Books ==
- Rural California, 1923.
- California Nurserymen and the Plant Industry, 1850–1910, 1921.
- Second Thousand Answered Questions in California Agriculture, 1916.
- California Garden Flowers, Shrubs, Trees, and Vines: Being Mainly Suggestions for Working Amateurs, 1915.
- One Thousand Questions in California Agriculture Answered, 1914.
- Luther Burbank; Man, Methods and Achievements. San Francisco: Pacific Rural Press, 1902. Previously published as a series of articles in Sunset, beginning in December 1901.
- The California Vegetables in Garden and Field, 1898. 2nd edition, 1910
- The California Fruits and How to Grow Them. San Francisco: Pacific Rural Press, 1889. 10th edition, 1926
- California Illustrated No. 1: The Vacaville Early Fruit District. California View Publishing Co., 1885. 2nd edition, 1888
