= Pluot =

Hybrid fruit

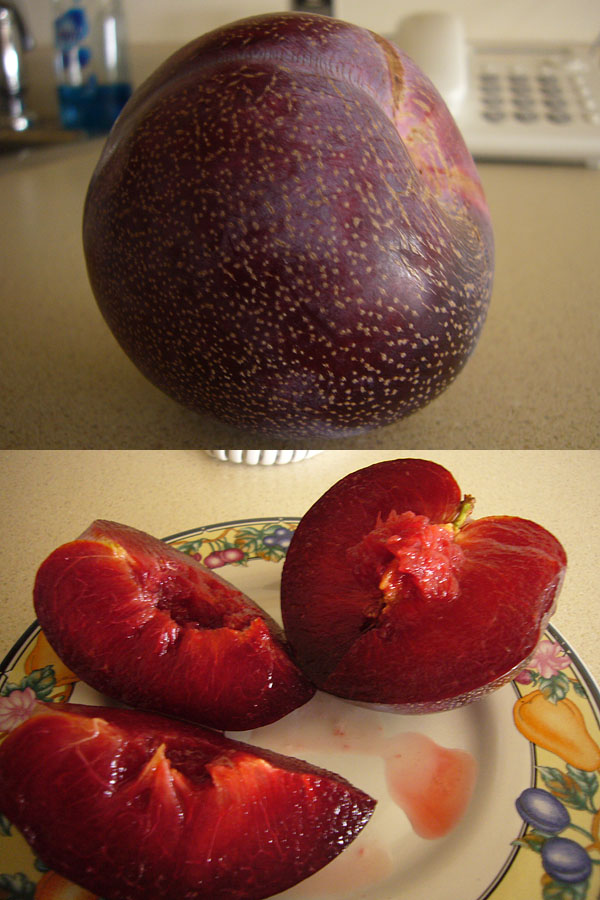
A pluot varietal, "raspberry jewel", before (top) and after cutting

Pluots, apriums, apriplums, plumcots, plumpicots, or plucots are some of the hybrids between different Prunus species that are also called interspecific plums. Whereas plumcots and apriplums are first-generation hybrids between a plum parent (P. salicina) and an apricot (P. armeniaca), pluots and apriums are later-generations. Both names "plumcot" and "apriplum" have been used for trees derived from a plum seed parent, and are therefore equivalent.

== Plumcots and apriplums ==
Natural plumcots (also called apriplums) have been known for hundreds of years from regions of the world that grow both plums and apricots from seed. The name plumcot was coined by Luther Burbank. The plumcot (apriplum) tree is propagated asexually, primarily by grafting or budding.

== Pluots ==
Pluots (pronunciation: /ˈpluːɒt/) are later generations of complex hybrid between the Japanese plum, Prunus salicina (providing the greater amount of parentage), and the apricot, Prunus armeniaca. The fruit's exterior has smooth skin closely resembling that of a plum. Pluots were developed in the late 20th century by Floyd Zaiger.

Pluot varieties include:

- Candy Stripe: medium, pink-yellow striped, with very sweet and juicy flesh.
- Cherry: small, bright red skin with white flesh.
- Dapple Dandy: large sweet with pale green to yellow, red-spotted skin, red or pink juicy flesh.
- Flavorella: round, medium-sized, golden-yellow, with sweet and juicy flesh.
- Flavor Heart: very large, black with a heart shape, and yellow flesh.
- Flavor King: very sweet, medium or large, with red-purple skin and red flesh.
- Flavorosa: very sweet or tart, medium-sized, flat round dark-purple fruit with red flesh.
- Flavor Prince: large round and purple, with red flesh.
- Flavor Rich: medium-sweet, large black round fruit with orange flesh.
- Flavor Supreme: medium or large, greenish purple skin, juicy red flesh.
- Flavor Queen: large light-green to yellow, very juicy.
- Red Ray: medium, bright red with dense, sweet orange flesh.

== Apriums ==
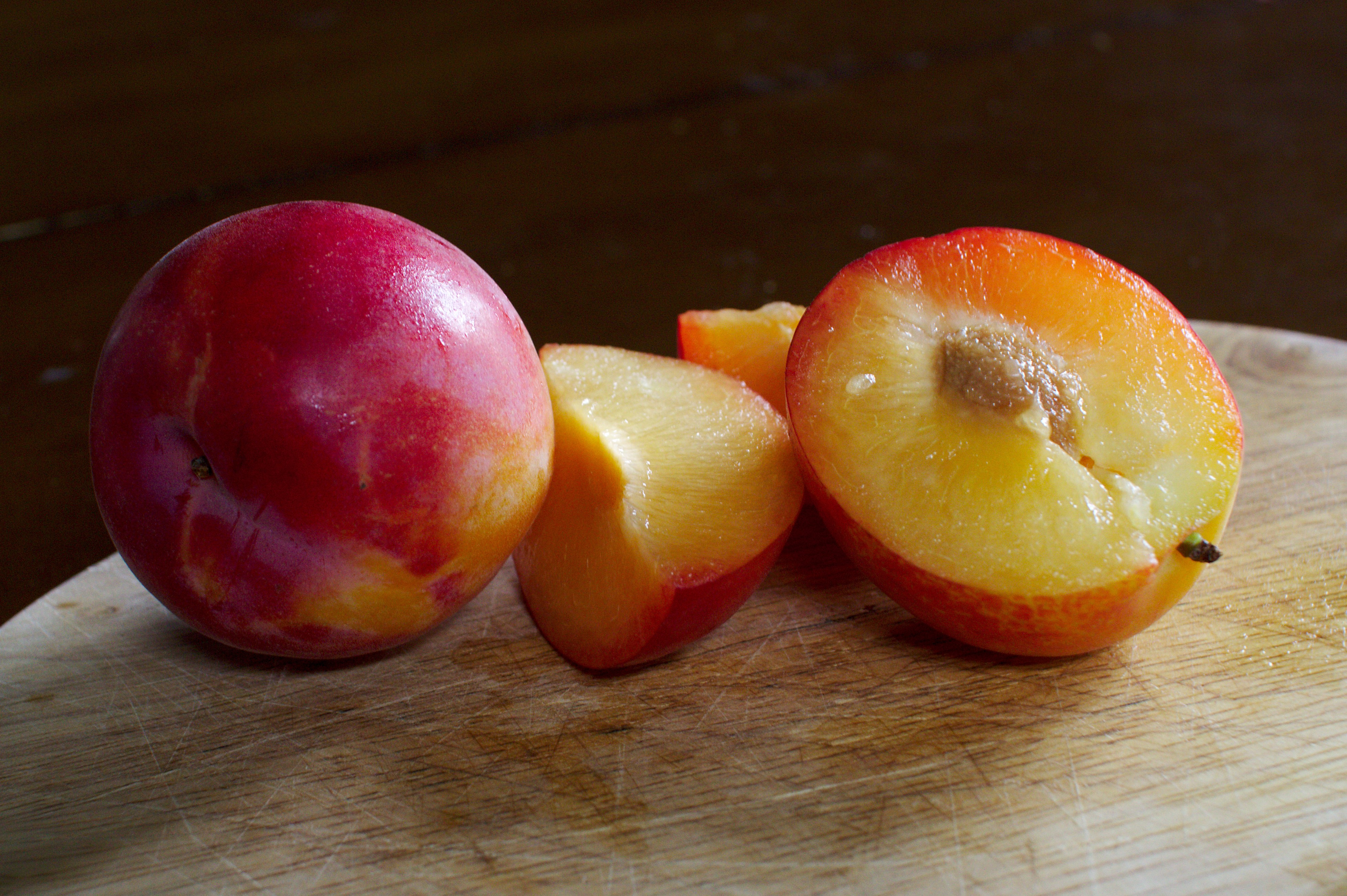
Rose apriums

Floyd Zaiger created the aprium, a hybrid cross between apricots and plums but more similar to apricots. Apriums are complex plum-apricot hybrids that show primarily apricot traits and flavor. Apriums resemble apricots on the outside. The flesh is usually dense and notable for its sweet taste due to a high content of fructose and other sugars. Apriums are usually only available early in the fruit season, like apricots and unlike pluots, which include some very late-ripening varieties. Aprium trees grow quickly and are smaller compared to other common home-grown apricots. The fruit is gold, with red coloration. Semi-mature fruit is hard and does not ripen if picked before completely mature.

== See also ==
- Nectaplum
- Peacotum
- Prunus brigantina, an apricot species with smooth-skinned fruit
- Prunus dasycarpa, an apricot hybrid known as "black apricot" or "purple apricot"
