= Luther Burbank =

American botanist and horticulturist (1849–1926)

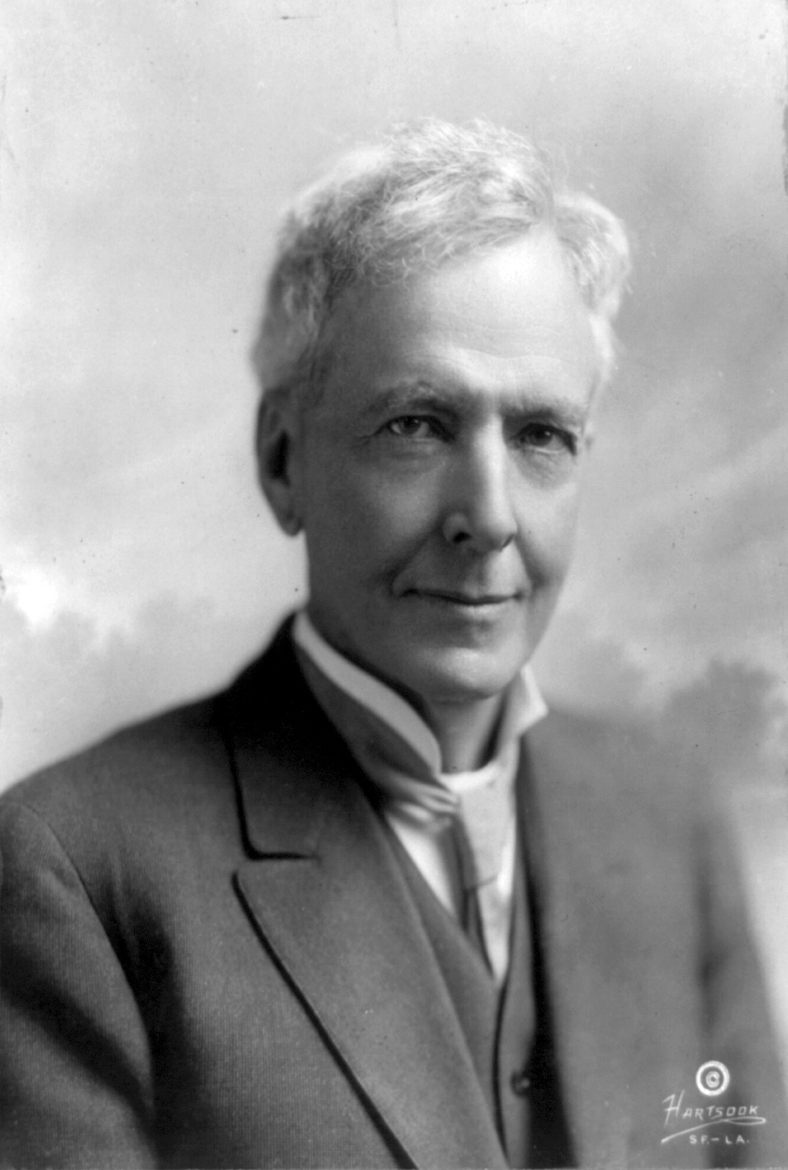
- Born: March 7, 1849; Lancaster, Massachusetts, US
- Died: April 11, 1926 (aged 77); Santa Rosa, California, US
- Spouses: Helen Coleman, Elizabeth Waters
- Children: None
- Scientific career
- Fields: Botany
- Patrons: Andrew Carnegie
- Author abbrev. (botany): Burbank

Signature
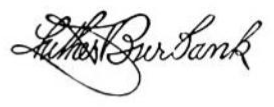

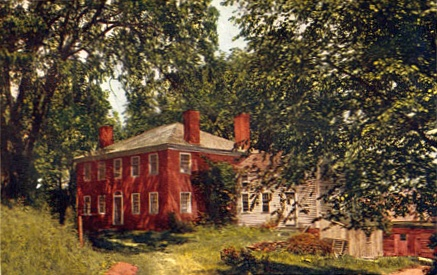
Burbank birthplace in Lancaster, Massachusetts

Luther Burbank (March 7, 1849 – April 11, 1926) was an American botanist, horticulturist, and pioneer in agricultural science who developed more than 800 strains and varieties of plants over his 55-year career. Burbank primarily worked with fruits, flowers, grains, grasses, and vegetables. He developed (but did not create) a spineless cactus (useful for cattle-feed) and the plumcot.

Burbank's most successful strains and varieties included the Shasta daisy, the fire poppy (note possible confusion with the California wildflower, Papaver californicum, which is also called a "fire poppy"), the "July Elberta" peach, the "Santa Rosa" plum, the "Flaming Gold" nectarine, the "Wickson" plum (named after the agronomist Edward J. Wickson), the freestone peach, and the white blackberry.

A natural genetic variant of the Burbank potato with russet-colored skin later became known as the russet Burbank potato. This large, brown-skinned, white-fleshed potato has become the world's predominant potato in food processing. The Russet Burbank potato originated to help with the devastating situation in Ireland following the Great Famine of 1845–1852. This particular potato variety was developed by Burbank and exported to Ireland to "revive that country's leading crop" as it is slightly late-blight-resistant. (Late blight is a disease that spread and destroyed potatoes all across Europe, but caused extreme chaos in Ireland due to the Irish population's high dependency on potatoes as a crop.)

== Life and work ==
Born in Lancaster, Massachusetts, Burbank grew up on a farm and received only a high school education in Lancaster County Academy. The thirteenth of fifteen children, he enjoyed the plants in his mother's large garden. His father died when he was 18 years old, and Burbank used his inheritance to buy a 17-acre (69,000 m^{2}) plot of land near Lunenburg center. There, he developed the Burbank potato. Burbank sold the rights to the Burbank potato for $150 ($4,398 in 2025 dollars) and used the money to travel to Santa Rosa, California, in 1875. Later, a natural vegetative sport (that is, an aberrant growth that can be reproduced reliably in cultivation) of Burbank potato with russetted skin was selected and named Russet Burbank potato. Today, the Russet Burbank potato is the most widely cultivated potato in the United States. The potato is popular because it doesn't expire as easily as other types of potatoes. A large percentage of McDonald's french fries are made from this cultivar.

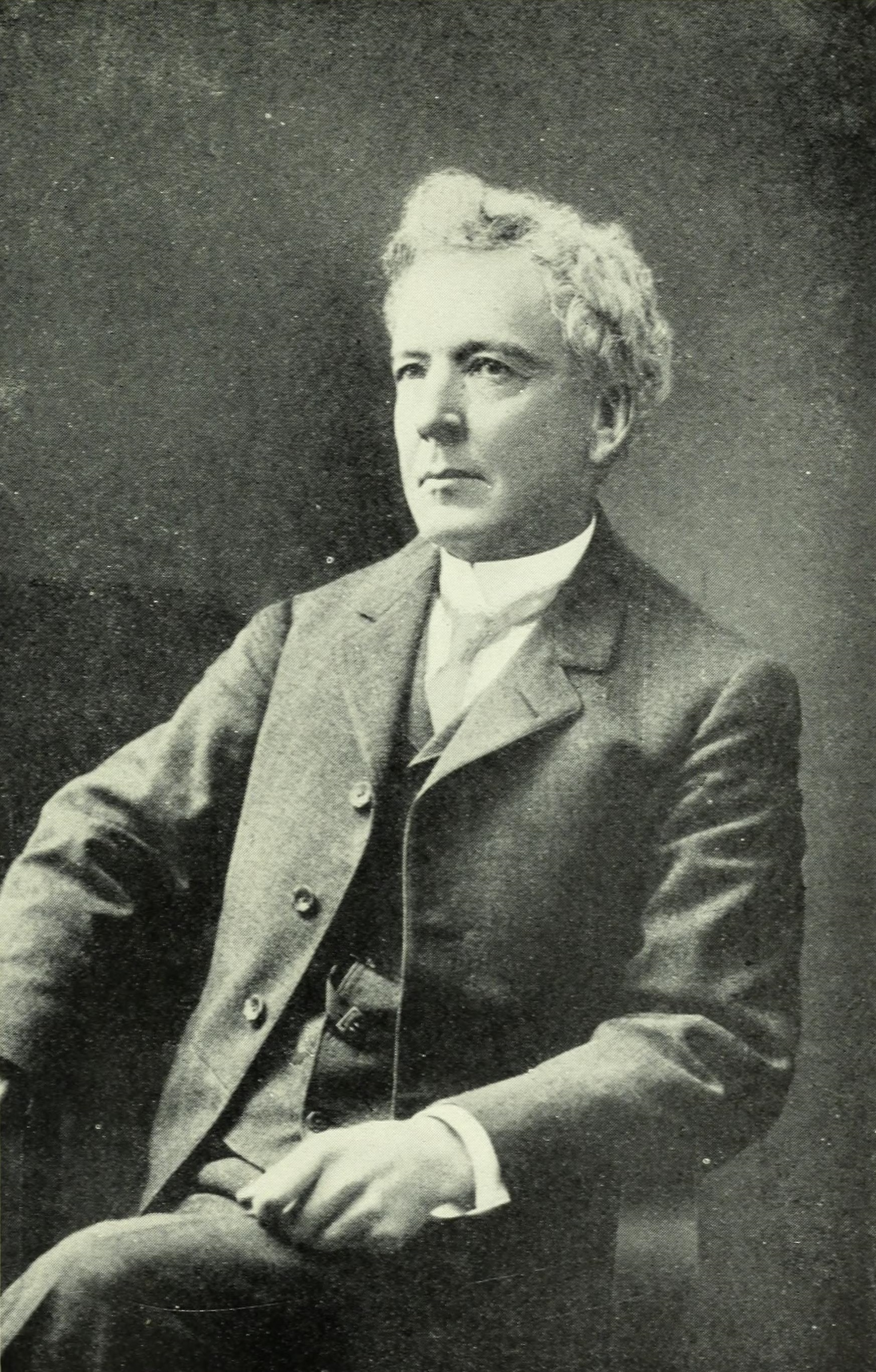
Photograph by Gabriel Moulin

Burbank in 1901 on the Steps of his cabin at the experimental farm in Sebastopol, California.

In Santa Rosa, Burbank purchased a 4-acre (1.6 ha) plot of land, and established a greenhouse, nursery, and experimental fields that he used to conduct crossbreeding experiments on plants, inspired by Charles Darwin's The Variation of Animals and Plants Under Domestication. (This site is now open to the public as a city park, Luther Burbank Home and Gardens.) Later he purchased an 18-acre (7.3 ha) plot of land in the nearby town of Sebastopol, called Gold Ridge Farm.

Burbank became known through his plant catalogs, the most famous being 1893's "New Creations in Fruits and Flowers," and through the word of mouth of satisfied customers, as well as press reports that kept him in the news throughout the first decade of the century.

In that same year, Stark Bro's Nurseries & Orchards Co. discovered the 'Delicious' apple, an elongated fruit with five bumps on the calyx end. The oddly-shaped apple attracted the attention of Burbank, a famed grafter and budder of trees, plants and flowers. He called the new 'Delicious' variety "the finest-flavored apple in all the world." It was also in 1893 that the Starks began their storied cooperation with Burbank and his new varieties of fruits.

Among those with the foresight to recognize the possibilities of Burbank's work was Clarence McDowell Stark, who went to California and sought Burbank out. After talking to him in Santa Rosa and seeing the results of his experiments, Clarence was convinced that Burbank was right, and his professorial critics were wrong. To Clarence's great dismay, he saw that Burbank was operating a small seed and nursery business in an attempt to finance his experiments and provide himself a living. It was clear that he would never be able to realize his potential under such meager circumstances.

Clarence said to Burbank: "I don't think you will ever make a real success in the nursery business because your heart is not in it. But if you will carry forward the type of hybridizing you are doing, I think you will go very far in your chosen field. To demonstrate our sincere belief in your work, our company will give you $9,000 if you will let me pick three of these new fruits you have shown me."

Burbank often credited the Stark family with making his work profitable. In return, he later joined with Thomas Edison to support Paul Stark Sr. in his fight to get patent legislation passed for plant breeders. Along with Clarence's $9,000 worth of help, Luther also had something of a fan club – The Luther Burbank Society. The group took it upon themselves to publish his discoveries and manage his business affairs, affording him some additional means by which to live.

From 1904 through 1909, Burbank received several grants from the Carnegie Institution to support his ongoing research on hybridization. He was supported by the practical-minded Andrew Carnegie himself, over those of his advisers who objected that Burbank was not "scientific" in his methods.

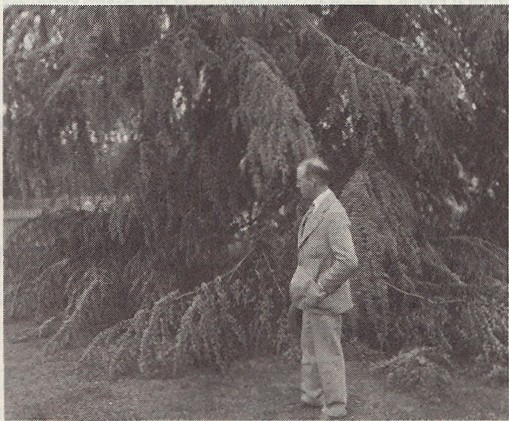
Paul Stark Sr. pays his respects at Luther Burbank's gravesite

Gastrointestinal complications and violent hiccups weakened Luther in the last two weeks before his death, which was ultimately caused by heart failure. At his bedside were Elizabeth (his wife) and his sister when he died on April 11, 1926. The famous botanist was buried in an unmarked grave, under a giant Cedar of Lebanon at the Luther Burbank Home and Gardens in Santa Rosa, California. The tree in the photo no longer stands.

As Burbank's life drew to a close, the question arose as to who would carry on his work, and naturally there were many interested in doing so. Before his death in April 1926, Luther Burbank spoke quietly to his wife, and said:

"If anything happens to me, you will have to dispose of the business and the work, because you can't go on with it. There aren't a dozen organizations in the world that are equipped to go forward with it; of them all, there is really only one I think of that could make the most of it."

He named Stark Bro's Nurseries & Orchards Company to carry on the work. Considerable argument has been spent upon whether the plants were technically willed to Stark Bro's; they were not. He left everything to Elizabeth: money, personal property, real estate, dozens of municipal utility bonds—and the plants and precious seeds. Elizabeth had first approached both Stanford University and the University of California, Berkeley to have either or both universities take over the experimental farm, but sold to Stark when those proffers did not materialize. Mrs. Burbank entered into an agreement with Stark Bro's on August 23, 1927, to take the material they wanted from Burbank's properties. The contract included ownership of the business name and all of the customer information. A September 6, 1927, contract provided exclusive rights to sell uncompleted experiments with fruits at Sebastopol (except the Royal and Paradox) for 10 years. Stark Bro's had right of renewal. Tax receipts indicate payments of $27,000 to Mrs. Burbank. New kinds of fruits and flowers Burbank had developed (but never marketed) included 120 types of plums, 18 peaches, 28 apples, 500 hybrid roses, 30 cherries, 34 pears, 52 gladioli and many more. Stark Bro's subsequently introduced many of these varieties in their catalog.

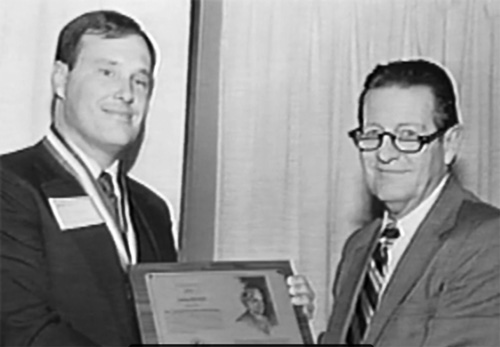
Clay Stark Logan (l) accepting induction into the National Inventors Hall of Fame on behalf of Luther Burbank (1986).

Until 1931, the Experiment Farm fell into some disrepair, so Stark Bro's sent emissaries to retrieve the most promising fruit, nut and ornamental shrubs, and in 1931 sold the flowers, vegetables and seeds to Burpee Seed Company. J. B. Keil came from Stark Bro's to coordinate the efforts and worked there from 1931 to 1934. Over the following years, Elizabeth worked with the Stark brothers to patent 16 Burbank fruits and flowers. The patents name Luther Burbank, deceased, as "inventor" by Elizabeth Waters Burbank, executrix of his estate. In 1935, Stark ended the agreement with Mrs. Burbank (or vice versa).

Mrs. Burbank then dispersed the majority of the gardens for subdivision. She sold the remaining property (excluding the house and greenhouse) to the Santa Rosa Junior College for use as a training ground. This lasted until 1954 (J. B. Keil stayed on as the caretaker). Twenty years later, the City took over ownership of the property (which it retains today as a free public showplace). The gardens include a thornless rose, spineless cactus, rainbow corn, a hybrid mulberry tree (which Luther hoped would spark an American silk industry) and his red combustion plant (Euonymus alatus).

=== Burbank cultivars ===
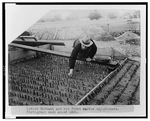
Burbank tending young spineless cactus plants c 1890

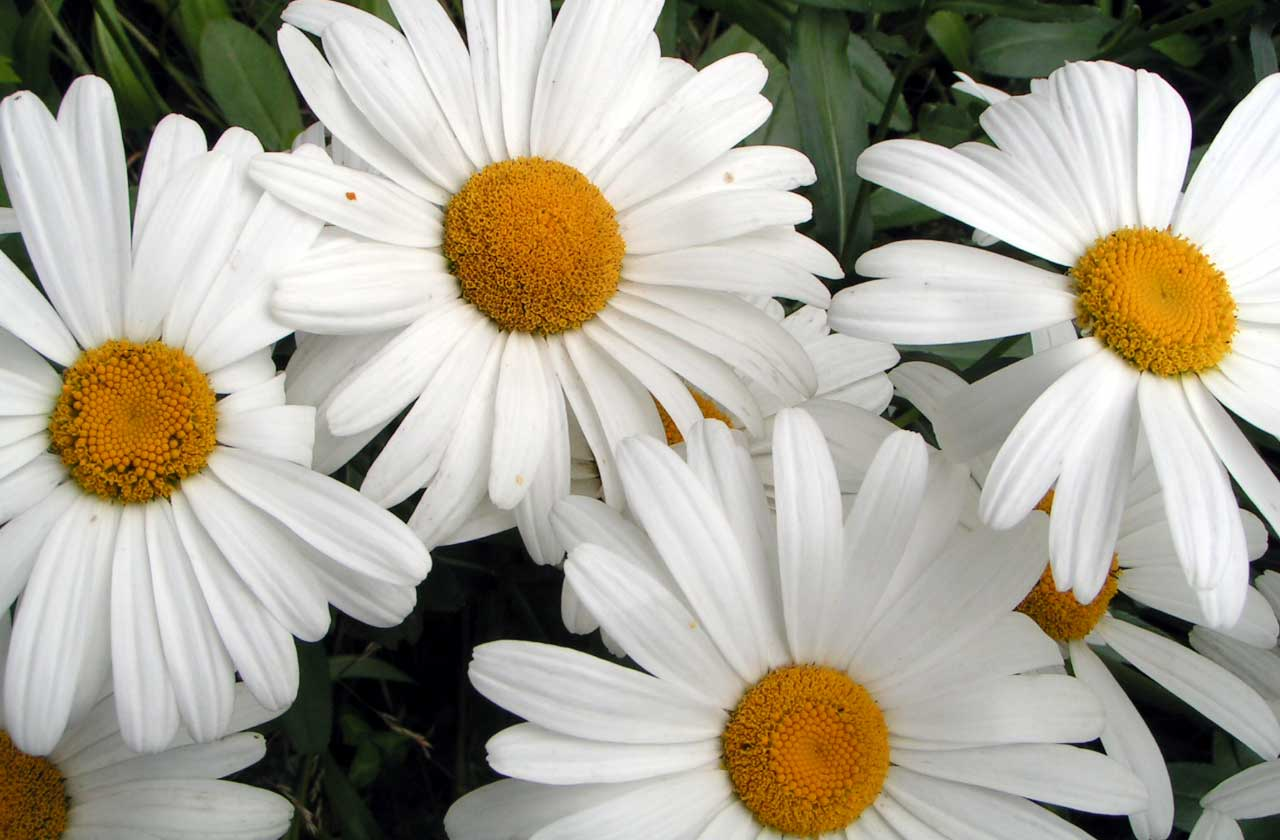
Shasta daisy

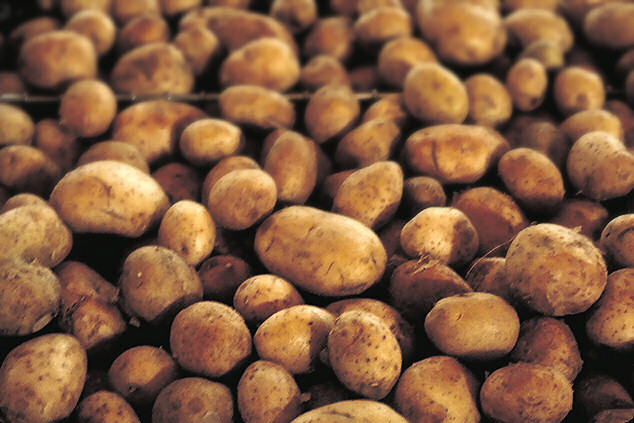
Russet Burbank potatoes

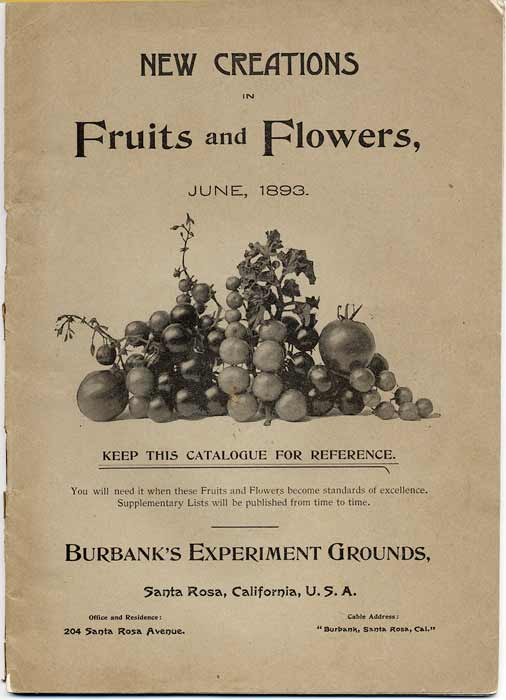
New Creations in Fruits and Flowers cover

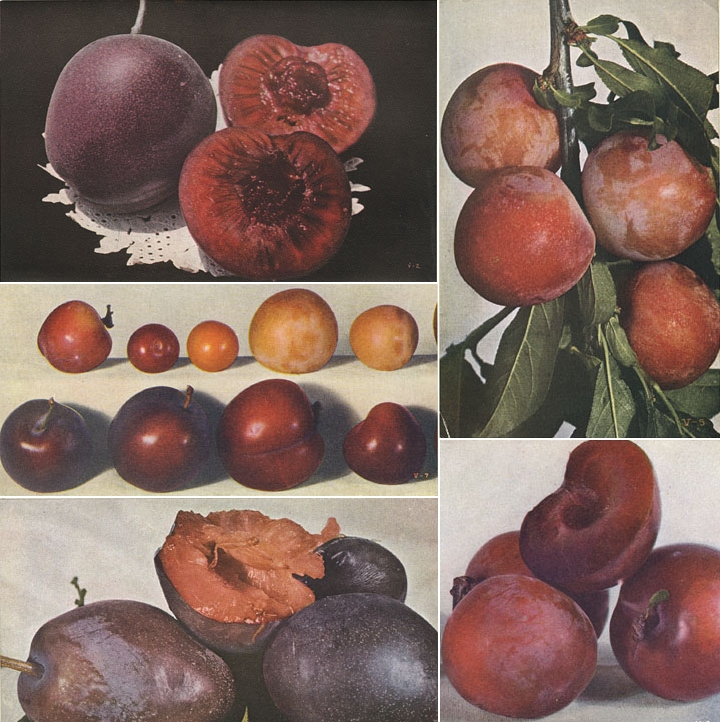
Burbank plums

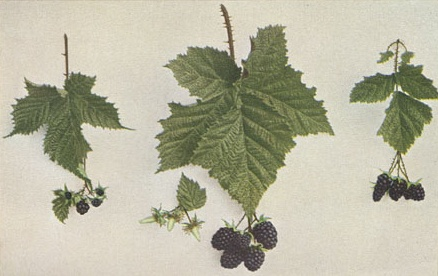
Forms of leaves and fruits quality correlations. After issue 1914.

Burbank created hundreds of new varieties of fruits (plum, pear, prune, peach, blackberry, raspberry); potato, tomato; ornamental flowers and other plants. He introduced over 800 new plants, including flowers, grains, grasses, vegetables, cacti, and fruits.

Fruits

- 113 plums and prunes
- 69 nuts
- 35 fruiting cactus
- 16 blackberries
- 13 raspberries
- 11 quinces
- 11 plumcots
- 10 cherries
- 10 strawberries
- 10 apples
- 8 peaches
- 6 chestnuts
- 5 nectarines
- 4 grapes
- 4 pears
- 3 walnuts
- 2 figs
- 1 almond

Grains, grasses, forage

- 9 types

Vegetables

- 26 types

Ornamentals

- 91 types

On paper his method seems simple, but in practice it was extremely difficult. Most of the time, he would grow 10,000 or more plants of one variety, from which he selected as many as 50 seedlings or as few as one. From the selected plant or plants, he grew another 10,000 seedlings, continuing selective process until he produced the results he wanted. When he started his work, chestnut trees took 25 years to bear fruit. From his efforts, chestnut trees produced fruit after three years. A white blackberry so clear that one could see the seeds inside, a juicy and large plum which is still considered one of the finest in the world, a spineless cactus, and a calla lily with fragrant odor were among his many creations.

=== Publications ===
Burbank was criticized by scientists of his day because he did not keep the kind of careful records that are the norm in scientific research and because he was mainly interested in creating useful or targeted cultivars rather than in the basic research of understanding their biology or the mechanisms by which his artificial selection schemes achieved their results. Purdue University professor Jules Janick, writing in the 2004 World Book Encyclopedia, says: "Burbank cannot be considered a scientist in the academic sense."

Although Burbank may not have been a scientist by the standards of his peers, his lack of record keeping reflected the difficulties of developing and distributing cultivars in the era in which he lived. His innovations were revolutionary, and in a time when there was no way to legally protect one's inventions, Burbank may have been cautious with the successes he decided to document. Additionally, his records may not have been coherent (to the chagrin of modern scholars) because he felt his time was better valued in the garden, not writing each trial and error down in his record book.

In 1893, Burbank published a descriptive catalog of some of his best varieties, entitled New Creations in Fruits and Flowers.

In 1907, Burbank published an "essay on childrearing", called The Training of the Human Plant. In it, he advocated improved treatment of children, cultural homogenization and replacement in education, and management of reproduction and development in both a eugenic and euthenic manner, though he does not directly reference either. His support for eugenic methods is couched in his horticultural methodology and he makes direct analogies between the two, comparing the population of the United States to a massive outcrossing experiment:

We are more crossed than any other nation in the history of the world, and here we meet the same results that are always seen in a much-crossed race of plants: all the worst as well as all the best qualities of each are brought out in their fullest intensities. When all the necessary crossing has been done, then comes the elimination, the work of refining, until we shall get an ultimate product that should be the finest race ever.

— Luther Burbank, The Training of the Human Plant, 1907, page 11.

During his career, Burbank wrote and co-wrote several books on his methods and results, including his eight-volume How Plants Are Trained to Work for Man (1921), Harvest of the Years (with Wilbur Hall, 1927), Partner of Nature (1939), and the 12-volume Luther Burbank: His Methods and Discoveries and Their Practical Application.

=== Methodology ===
Burbank experimented with a variety of techniques such as grafting, hybridization, and cross-breeding.

==== Intraspecific breeding ====
Intraspecific hybridization within a plant species was demonstrated by Charles Darwin and Gregor Mendel and was further developed by geneticists and plant breeders.

In 1908, George Harrison Shull described heterosis, also known as hybrid vigor. Heterosis describes the tendency of the progeny of a specific cross to outperform both parents. The detection of the usefulness of heterosis for plant breeding has led to the development of inbred lines that reveal a heterotic yield advantage when they are crossed. Maize was the first species where heterosis was widely used to produce hybrids.

By the 1920s, statistical methods were developed to analyze gene action and distinguish heritable variation from variation caused by environment. In 1933, another important breeding technique, cytoplasmic male sterility (CMS), developed in maize, was described by Marcus Morton Rhoades. CMS is a maternally inherited trait that makes the plant produce sterile pollen. This enables the production of hybrids without the need for labor-intensive detasseling.

These early breeding techniques resulted in large yield increases in the United States in the early 20th century. Similar yield increases were not produced elsewhere until after World War II. The Green Revolution increased crop production in the developing world in the 1960s.

=== Eugenics ===
Along with breeding plants, Burbank believed human beings should be selectively bred, and he was active in the American eugenics movement and wrote in publications of the American Breeders' Association as an honorary member. He was also elected to the ABA's Committee on Eugenics in 1906. As a eugenicist, he promoted genetic discrimination. In Burbank's book, The Training of the Human Plant he wrote:

I have constantly been impressed with the similarity between the organization and development of plant and human life. … I have come to find in the crossing of species and in selection, wisely directed, a great and powerful instrument for the transformation of the vegetable kingdom along lines that lead constantly upward. The crossing of species is to me paramount. Upon it, wisely directed and accompanied by a rigid selection of the best and as rigid an exclusion of the poorest, rests the hope of all progress. The mere crossing of species, unaccompanied by selection, wise supervision, intelligent care, and the utmost patience, is not likely to result in marked good, and may result in vast harm.

— Luther Burbank, The Training of the Human Plant, 1907, page 3.

This belief in the benefit of crossing human "species" and his staunch support for Lamarckian inheritance put him somewhat at odds with mainstream eugenic views of the time, which were in the majority strongly anti-miscegenation. His Lamarckian belief in the inheritance of acquired characteristics informed his support for population improvement primarily by managing the environment of children over many generations, which aligned him also with the euthenics movement. He believed that environment played a crucial role in the development of children:

Heredity is simply the sum of all the effects of all the environments of all past generations on the responsive, ever-moving life forces. There is no doubt that if a child with a vicious temper be placed in an environment of peace and quiet the temper will change. Put a boy born of gentle white parents among Indians and he will grow up like an Indian. Let the child born of criminal parents have a setting of morality, integrity, and love, and the chances are that he will not grow into a criminal, but into an upright man.

— Luther Burbank, The Training of the Human Plant, 1907, page 68.

== Classical plant breeding ==
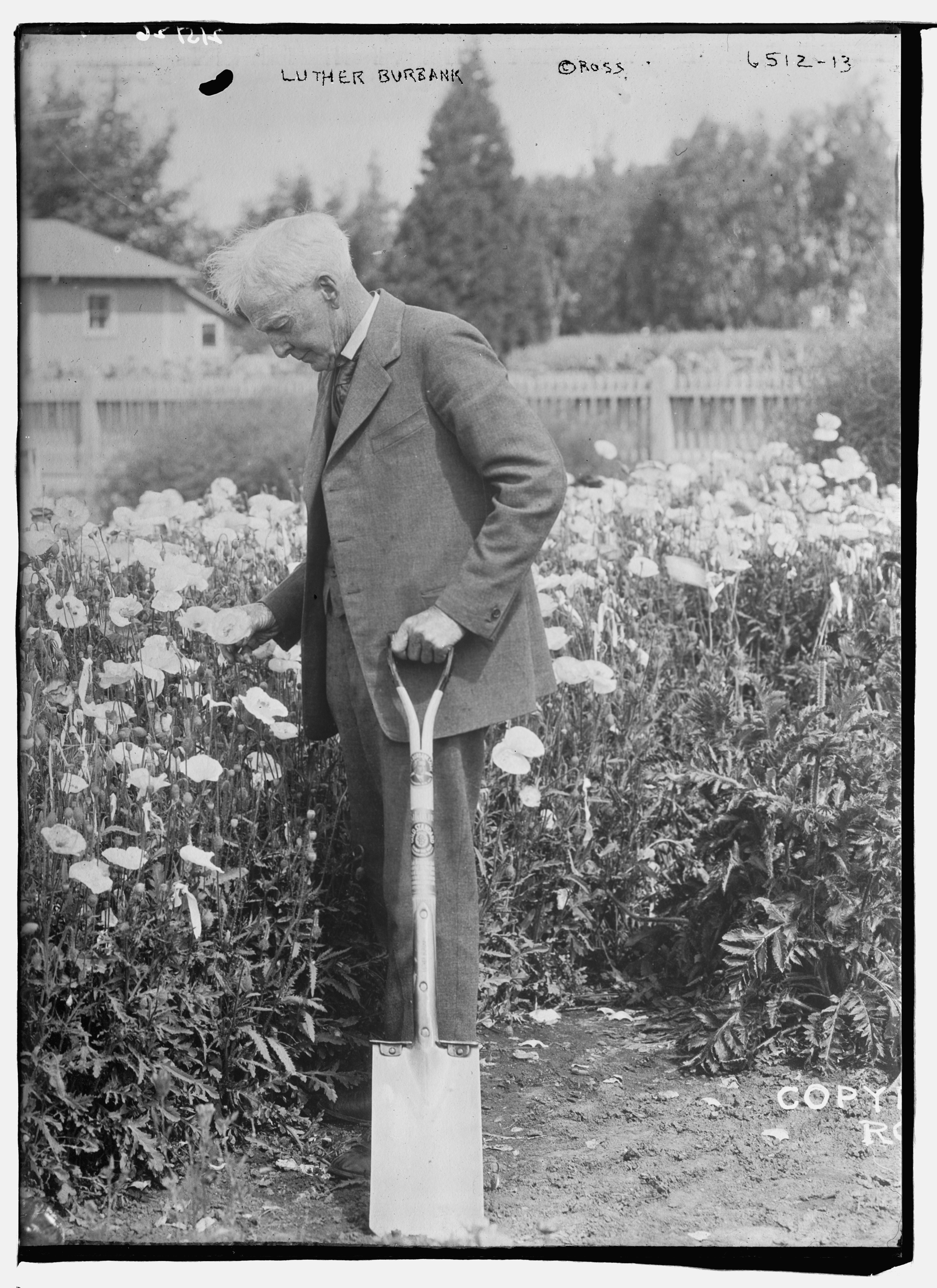
Burbank in 1900

Classical plant breeding uses deliberate interbreeding (crossing) of closely or distantly related individuals to produce new crop varieties or lines with desirable properties. Plants are crossbred to introduce traits/genes from one variety or line into a new genetic background. For example, a mildew-resistant pea may be crossed with a high-yielding but susceptible pea, the goal of the cross being to introduce mildew resistance without losing the high-yield characteristics. Progeny from the cross would then be crossed with the high-yielding parent to ensure that the progeny were most like the high-yielding parent, (backcrossing). The progeny from that cross would then be tested for yield and mildew resistance and high-yielding resistant plants would be further developed. Plants may also be crossed with themselves to produce inbred varieties for breeding.

Classical breeding relies largely on homologous recombination between chromosomes to generate genetic diversity. The classical plant breeder may also make use of a number of in vitro techniques such as protoplast fusion, embryo rescue or mutagenesis (see below) to generate diversity and produce hybrid plants that would not exist in nature.

Traits that breeders have tried to incorporate into crop plants in the last 100 years include:

1. Increased quality and yield of the crop
2. Increased tolerance of environmental pressures (salinity, extreme temperature, drought)
3. Resistance to viruses, fungi and bacteria
4. Increased tolerance to insect pests
5. Increased tolerance of herbicides

=== Mass selection ===
Burbank cross-pollinated the flowers of plants by hand and planted all the resulting seeds. He then selected the most promising plants to cross with other ones.

== Personal life ==
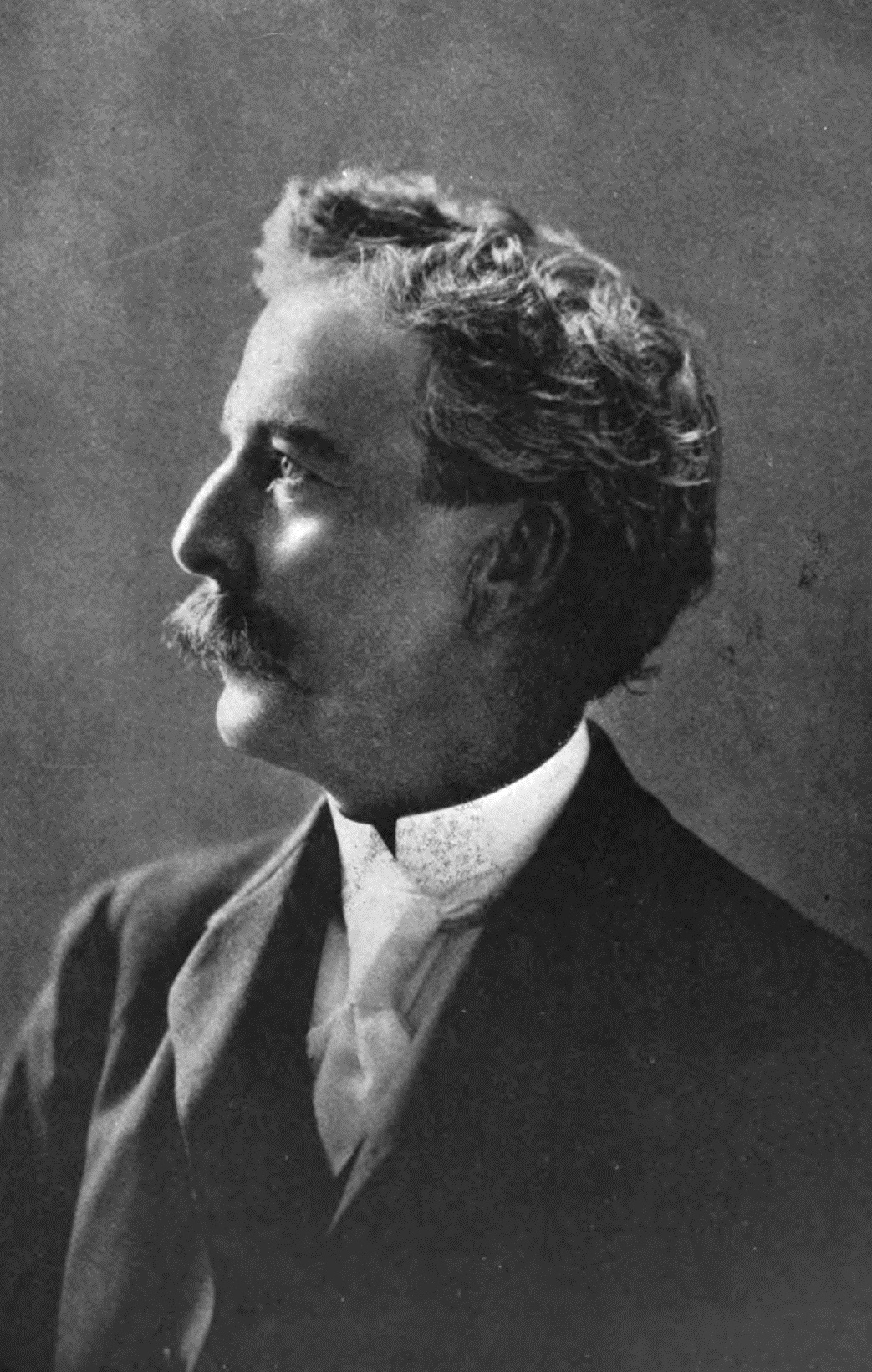
Luther Burbank – "The Wizard of Horticulture" (photographed no later than 1906)

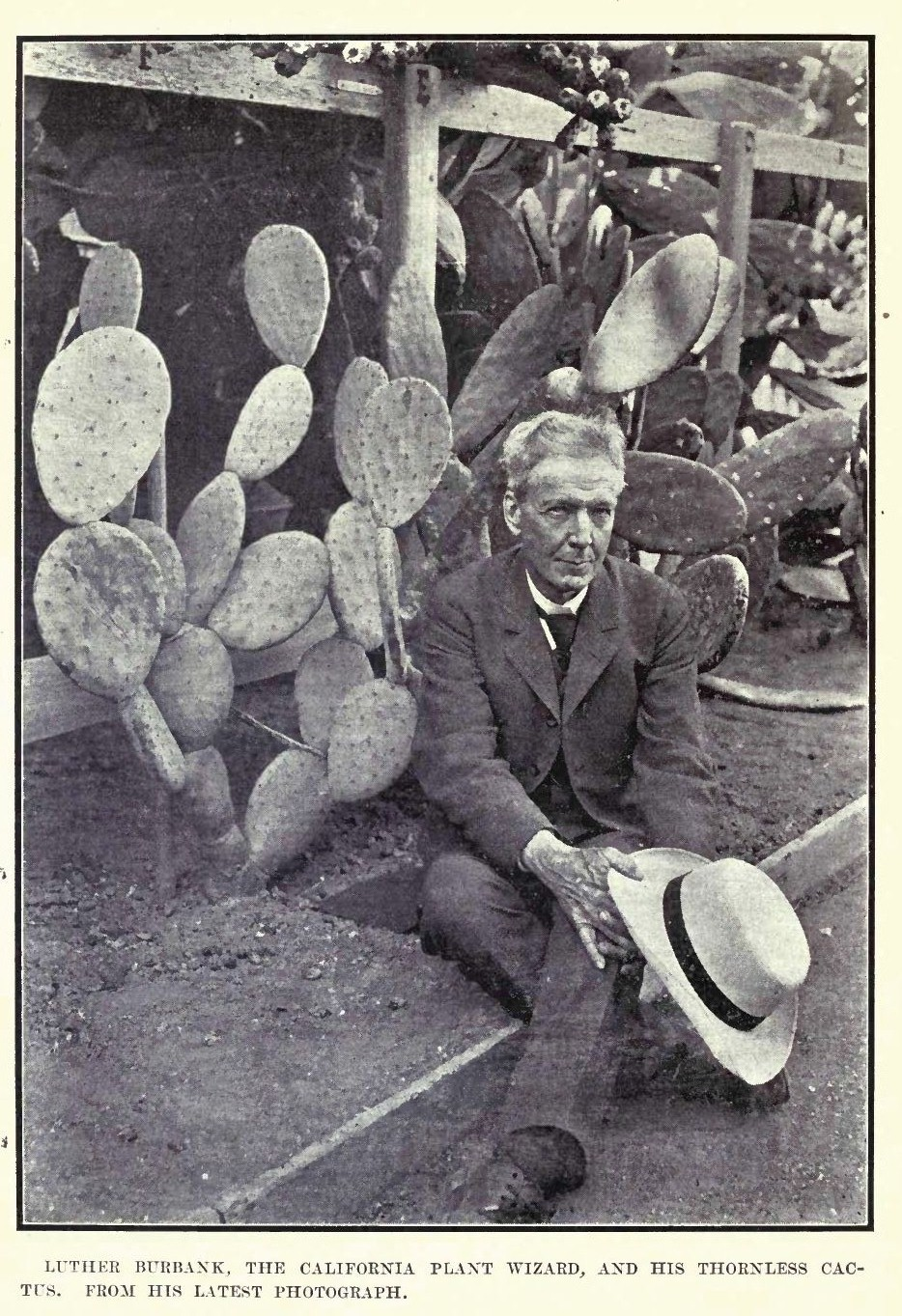
Luther Burbank with spineless cactus circa 1908

Burbank was praised and admired not only for his gardening skills but for his modesty, generosity and kind spirit. He was very interested in education and gave money to the local schools.

He married twice: to Helen Coleman in 1890, which ended in divorce in 1896; and to Elizabeth Waters in 1916. He had no children of his own but did adopt a daughter.

His heart was fathomlessly deep, long acquainted with humility, patience, sacrifice. His little home amid the roses was austerely simple; he knew the worthlessness of luxury, the joy of few possessions. The modesty with which he wore his scientific fame repeatedly reminded me of the trees that bend low with the burden of ripening fruits; it is the barren tree that lifts its head high in an empty boast.

In a speech given to the First Congregational church of San Francisco in 1926, Burbank said:

I love humanity, which has been a constant delight to me during all my seventy-seven years of life; and I love flowers, trees, animals, and all the works of Nature as they pass before us in time and space. What a joy life is when you have made a close working partnership with Nature, helping her to produce for the benefit of mankind new forms, colors, and perfumes in flowers which were never known before; fruits in form, size, and flavor never before seen on this globe; and grains of enormously increased productiveness, whose fat kernels are filled with more and better nourishment, a veritable storehouse of perfect food—new food for all the world's untold millions for all time to come.

Luther Burbank was highly revered throughout the United States of America. In September 1905 a group of California's most influential businessmen, intellectuals, and politicians gathered at a banquet thrown in honor of Luther Burbank by the State Board of Trade. Many people spoke about Burbank, such as Senator Perkins who stated that Burbank could teach the government valuable lessons, and that "he is doing more to instruct, interest, and make popular the work in the garden than any man of his generation."

At the same convention, Albert G. Burnett, a judge of the Superior Court for Sonoma County stated that Burbank had improved the community incredibly making it a place that people came "to sit at the feet of this great apostle and prophet of beauty and happiness ... and catch some measure of his matchless inspiration." He also stated that Burbank's deeds were always done to "bring more of the sunshine of comfort and happiness into the cottages of the poor as well as the palaces of the rich."

In 1924 Burbank wrote a letter endorsing the "Yogoda" training system of Paramahansa Yogananda as a superior alternative to what he considered narrowly intellectual education offered by most schools. He caused a great deal of public controversy a few months before his death in 1926 when he answered questions about his deepest beliefs by a reporter from the San Francisco Bulletin with the following statement:

I am an infidel today. I do not believe what has been served to me to believe. I am a doubter, a questioner, a skeptic. When it can be proved to me that there is immortality, that there is resurrection beyond the gates of death, then will I believe. Until then, no.

Paramahansa Yogananda wrote in Autobiography of a Yogi that "Intimate communion with Nature, who unlocked to him [Burbank] many of her jealously guarded secrets, had given Burbank a boundless spiritual reverence". Burbank had received Kriya Yoga initiation from Paramahansa Yogananda, and he is quoted as saying "I practice the technique devoutly, Swamiji...Sometimes I feel very close to the infinite power...then i have been able to heal sick persons around me, as well as many ailing plants". He is also recorded as saying the following in relation to his deceased mother "Many times since her death I have been blessed by her appearance in visions; she has spoken to me."

=== Death ===
In mid-March 1926, Burbank suffered a heart attack and became ill with gastrointestinal complications. He died on April 11, 1926, aged 77, and is buried near the greenhouse at the Luther Burbank Home and Gardens. The honor guard at his funeral included San Francisco mayor James Rolph, Santa Rosa mayor Charles O. Dunbar, and former Stanford University Chancellor David Starr Jordan. An address at the Memorial Service was given by Judge Ben Lindsey.

== Legacy ==
California's Arbor Day was made March 7, Luther Burbank's birthday, in honor of him.

Burbank's fame and admiration reflect the various ways people see humans' roles in nature, by representing both the importance of our connection to the natural world and the numerous possibilities created by plant manipulation. Burbank's work spurred the passing of the 1930 Plant Patent Act four years after his death. The legislation made it possible to patent new varieties of plants (excluding tuber-propagated plants). Thomas Edison testified before Congress in support of the legislation and said that "This [bill] will, I feel sure, give us many Burbanks." The authorities issued Plant Patents No. 12, #13, No. 14, #15, No. 16, #18, No. 41, #65, No. 66, #235, No. 266, #267, No. 269, #290, No. 291, and #1041 to Burbank posthumously.

In 1931, while visiting San Francisco, Frida Kahlo painted a portrait of Burbank emerging as a tree from his interred corpse.

In 1940, the U.S. Postal Service issued a 3-cent stamp honoring Burbank.

In 1986, Burbank was inducted into the National Inventors Hall of Fame. The Luther Burbank Home and Gardens, in downtown Santa Rosa, is now designated as a National Historic Landmark. Luther Burbank's Gold Ridge Experiment Farm is listed in the National Register of Historic Places a few miles west of Santa Rosa in the town of Sebastopol, California.

The home that Luther Burbank was born in, as well as his California garden office, were moved by Henry Ford to Dearborn, Michigan, and are part of Greenfield Village.

Several places and institutions are named for Luther Burbank. They include:

- Luther Burbank Center for the Arts, a large facility in Santa Rosa, California
- Luther Burbank High School in Sacramento, California
- Luther Burbank High School in San Antonio, Texas
- The Luther Burbank School District in San Jose, California
- Luther Burbank Middle School in Lancaster, Massachusetts
- Luther Burbank Middle School in the Los Angeles neighborhood of Highland Park, California
- Luther Burbank Middle School in Burbank, California
- Luther Burbank Elementary School in Milwaukee, Wisconsin
- Luther Burbank Elementary School in Santa Rosa, California
- Luther Burbank Elementary School in Burbank, Illinois
- Luther Burbank Elementary School in Long Beach, California
- Luther Burbank Elementary School in Merced, California
- Burbank Elementary School in Modesto, California
- Luther Burbank Park in Mercer Island, Washington
- Burbank Elementary School in Artesia, California
- The census-designated place Burbank, Washington
- The census-designated place Burbank, Santa Clara County, California
- The census-designated place Burbank, Illinois
- The census-designated place Burbank, Alabama
- Luther Burbank Savings, Santa Rosa-based financial institution

Plant species named after Luther Burbank

- Canna 'Burbank'
- Chrysanthemum burbankii Makino (Asteraceae)
- Myrica × burbankii A.Chev. (Myricaceae)
- Solanum × burbankii (Solanum retroflexum) (Solanaceae)

== See also ==
- Luther Burbank: His Methods and Discoveries, Their Practical Application
- Luther Burbank Rose Parade and Festival
