= White blackberry =

Variety of blackberry

'White blackberry'
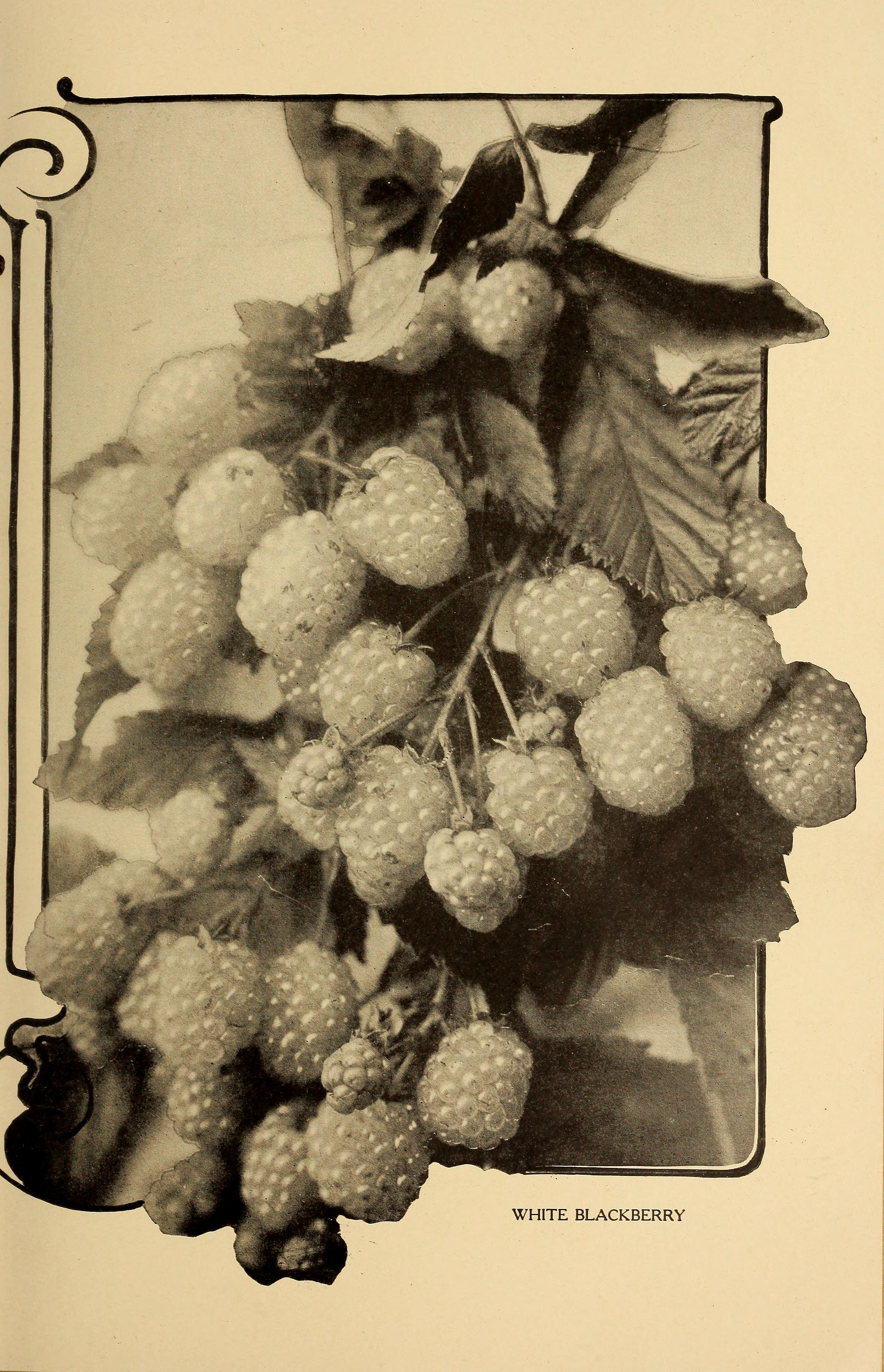
- White blackberry "Iceberg" in The Burbank seed book
- Breeder: Luther Burbank in 1914

The white blackberry is an unusual white variety of blackberry developed by plant breeder Luther Burbank, also known as the iceberg white blackberry or snowbank berry, probably originating as a pun on the name "Burbank".

He originally found a wild pale coloured blackberry in New Jersey, named "Crystal White". He then mixed that berry with the Lawton blackberry, and then other pale berries. Burbank had tried out 65,000 unsuccessful crossbreeds, at his facility in Santa Rosa, California, before achieving success in 1894.
