= Hayward, California =

City in California, United States

- City
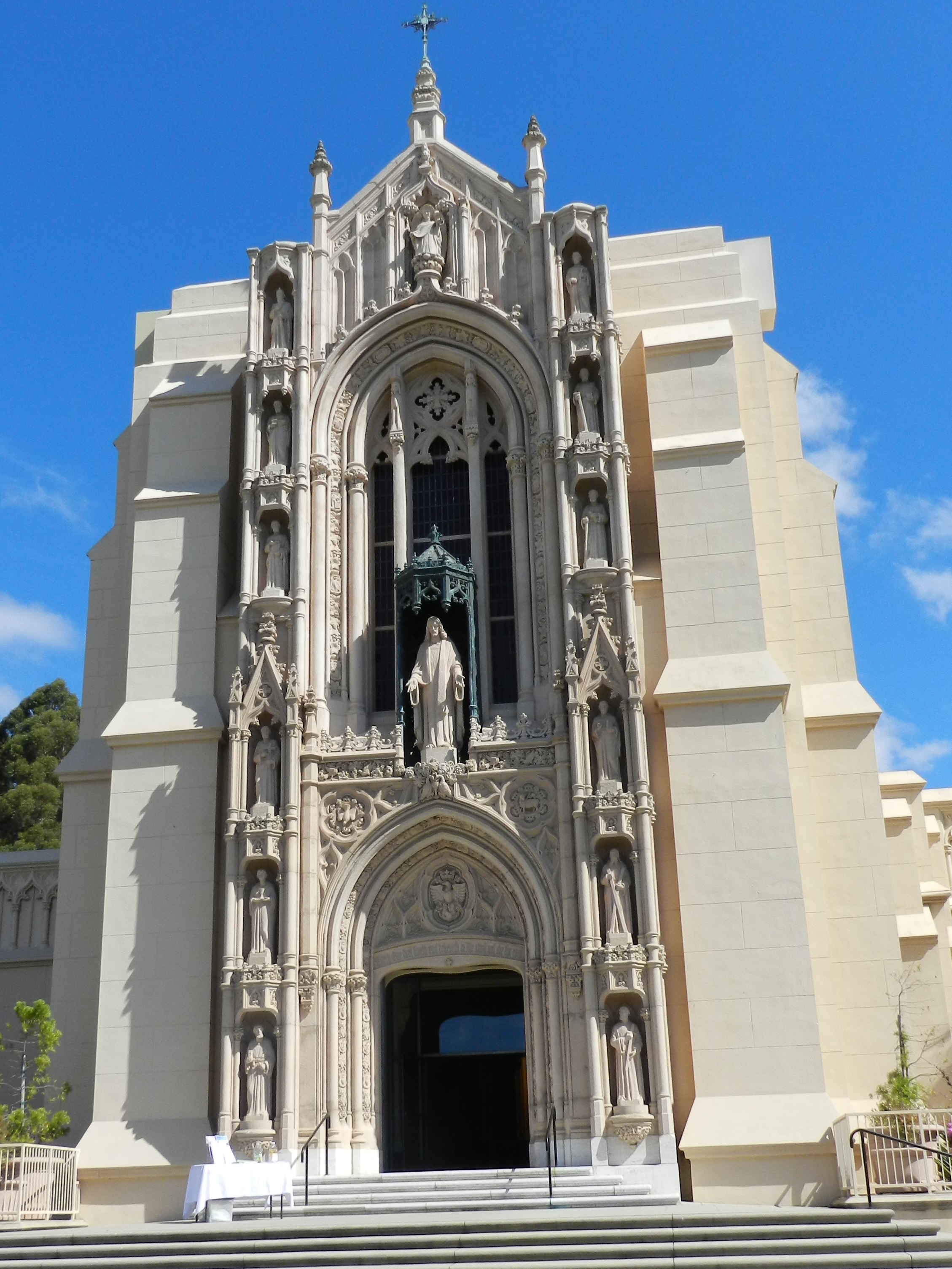
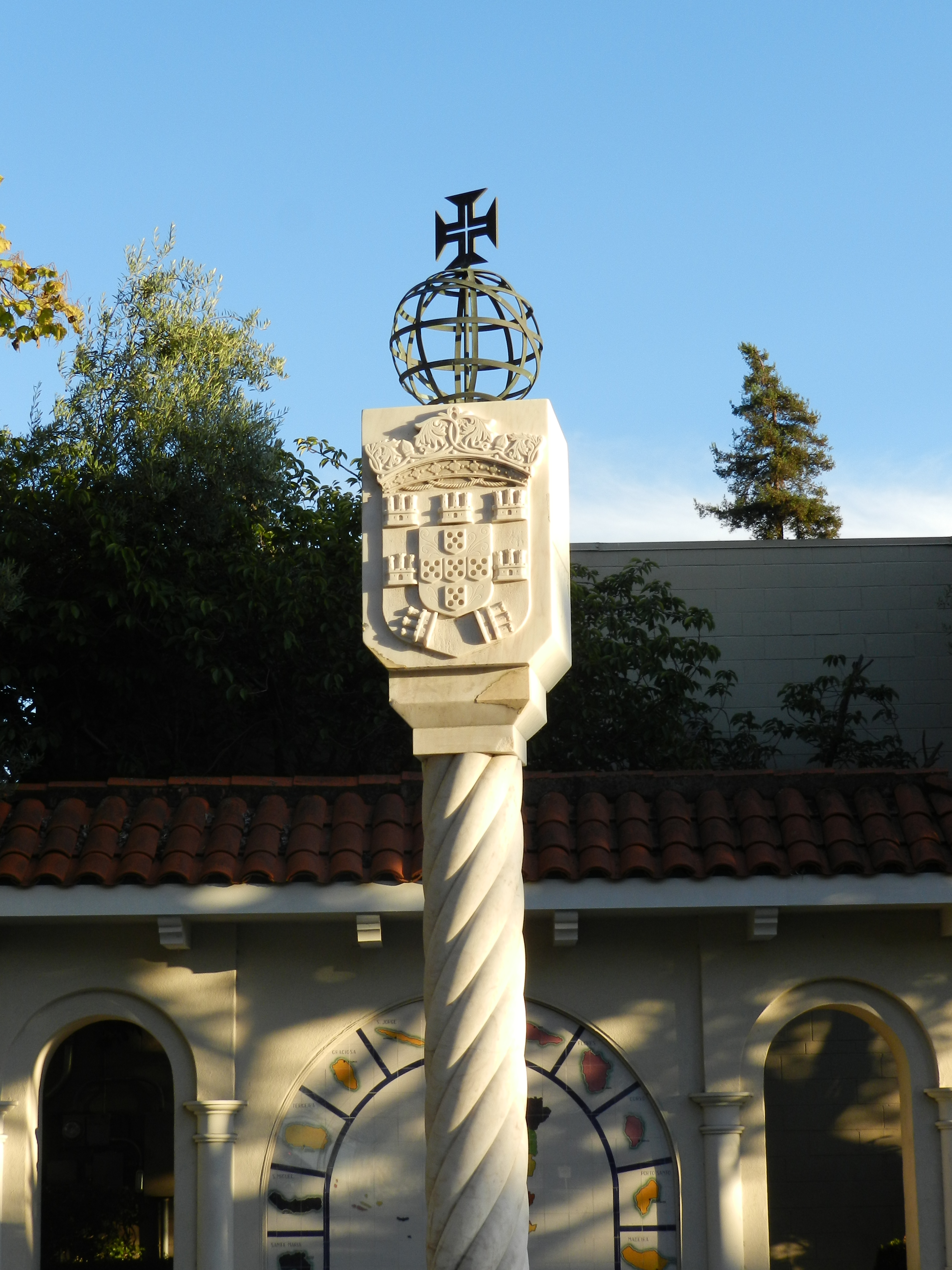
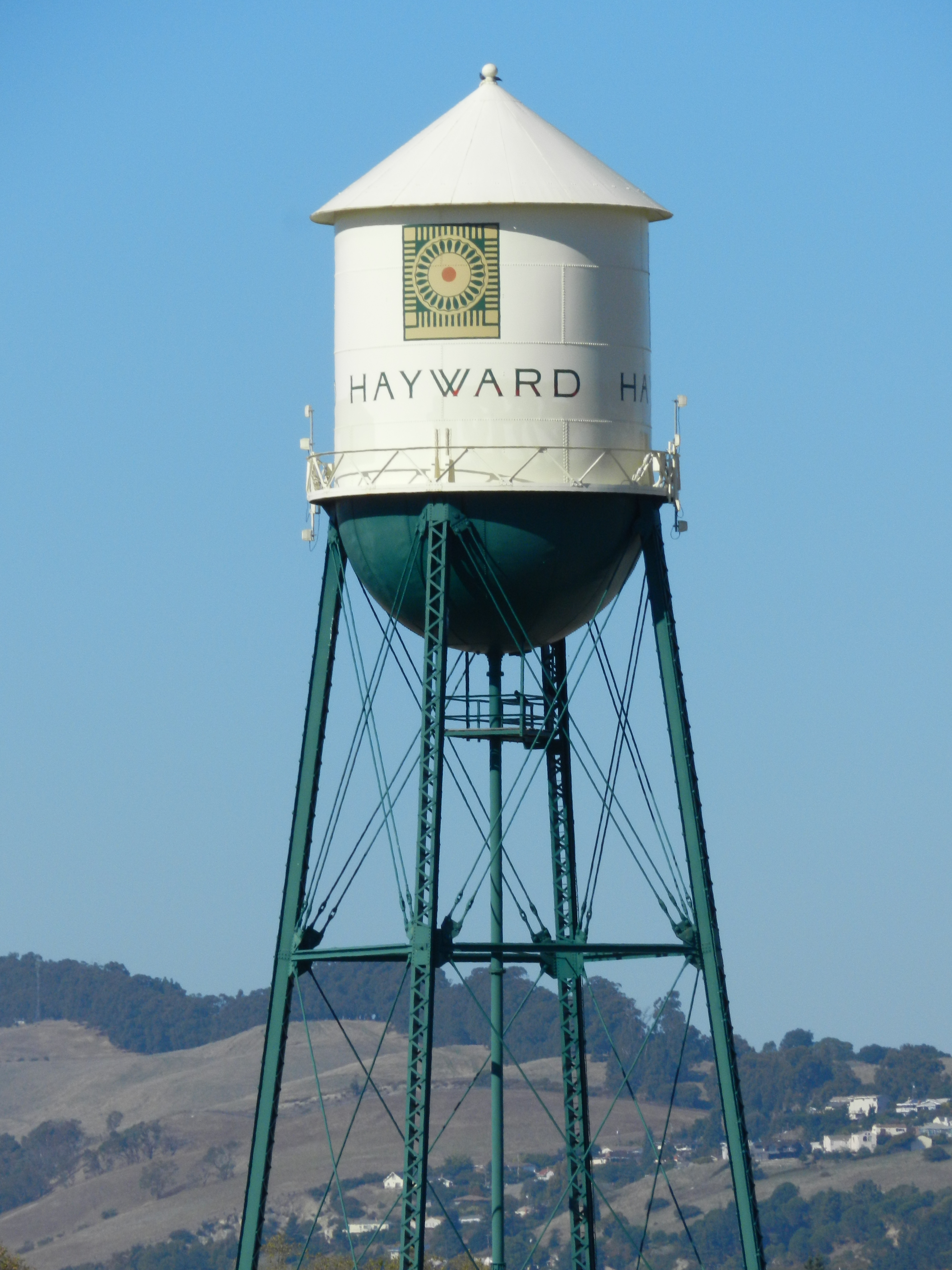
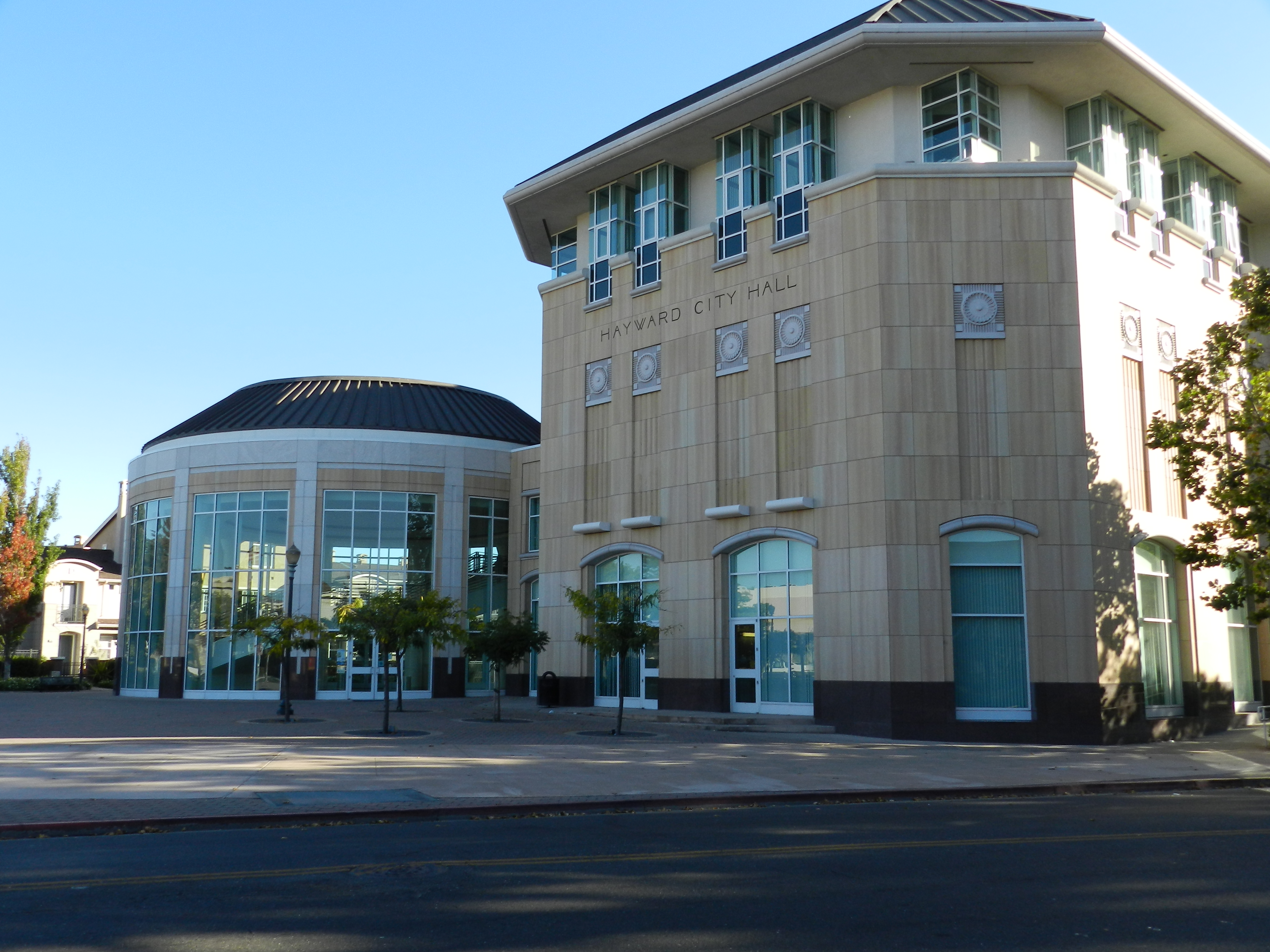
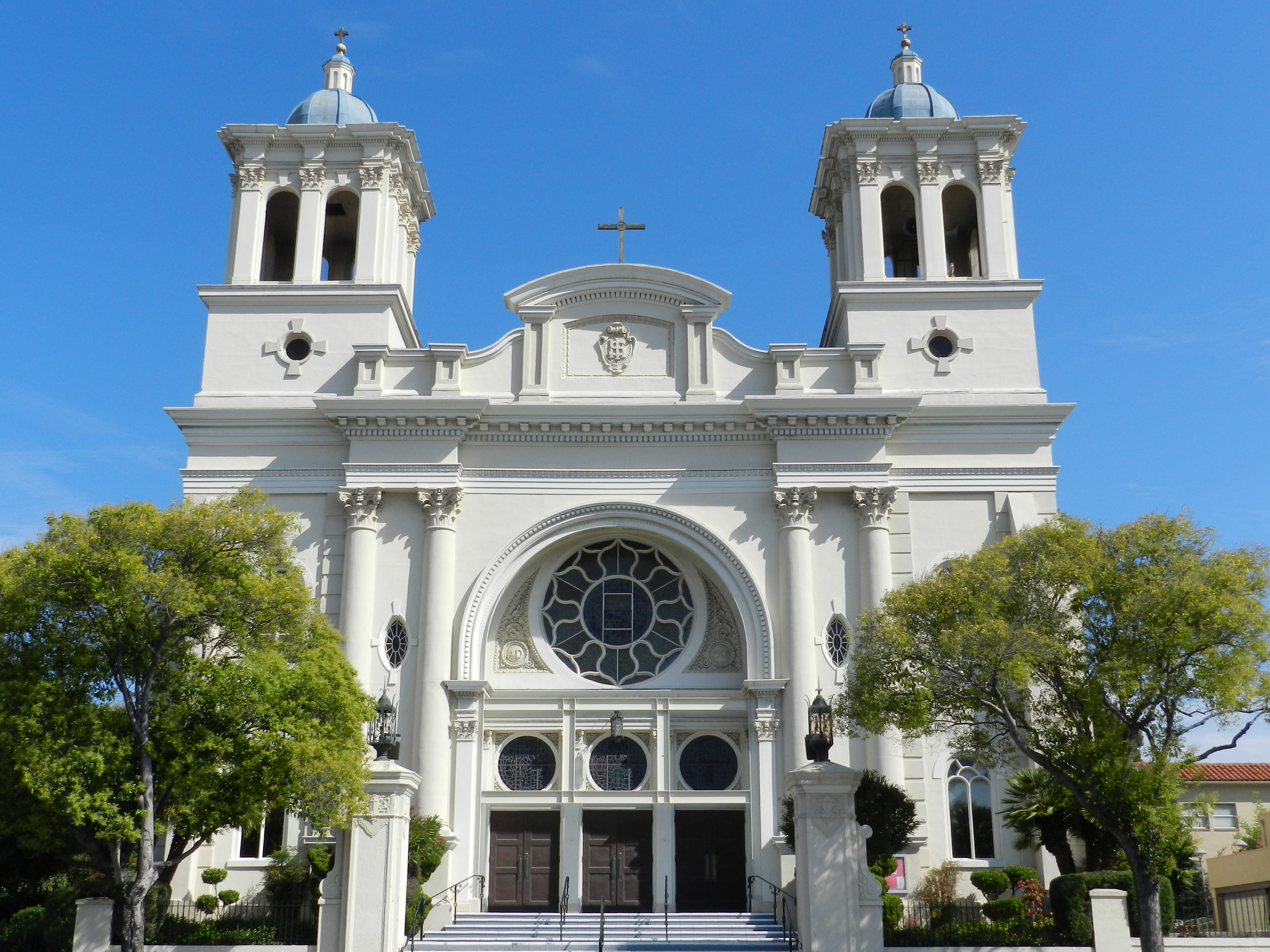
- Top: Holy Sepulchre Cemetery Mausoleum; Portuguese Memorial Park; Hayward Water Tower. Bottom: City Hall; All Saints Church.

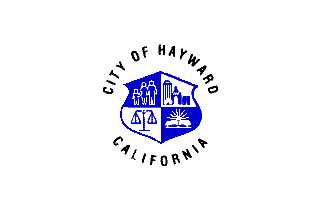
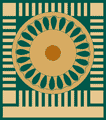
- Flag Seal
- Motto: Heart of the Bay
- Interactive map of Hayward, California
- Location in California Location in the United States of America
- Coordinates: 37°40′08″N 122°04′51″W
- Country: United States
- State: California
- County: Alameda
- Incorporated: March 11, 1876

Government
  - Type: Council-Manager
  - Mayor: Mark Salinas
  - State Senate: Vacant
  - Assemblymember: Liz Ortega (D)
  - U. S. rep.: Aisha Wahab (D)

Area
  - City: 64.12 sq mi (166.08 km^{2})
  - Land: 45.82 sq mi (118.67 km^{2})
  - Water: 18.31 sq mi (47.42 km^{2}) 28.5%
- Elevation: 105 ft (32 m)

Population (2020)
  - City: 162,954
  - Rank: 3rd in Alameda County; 36th in California; 170th in the United States
  - Density: 3,556.5/sq mi (1,373.2/km^{2})
- Time zone: UTC−8 (Pacific)
  - Summer (DST): UTC−7 (PDT)
- ZIP codes: 94540–94546, 94552, 94557
- Area code: 510, 341
- FIPS code: 06-33000
- GNIS feature IDs: 277607, 2410724
- Flower: Carnation
- Website: www.hayward-ca.gov

Hayward is a city in Alameda County, California, United States, in the East Bay subregion of the San Francisco Bay Area. With a population of 162,954 as of 2020, Hayward is the sixth largest city in the Bay Area, and the third largest in Alameda County. Hayward was ranked as the 36th most populous municipality in California. It is included in the San Francisco–Oakland–San Jose Metropolitan Statistical Area by the US Census. It is located primarily between Castro Valley, San Leandro and Union City, and lies at the eastern terminus of the San Mateo–Hayward Bridge.

== Name ==
Hayward was originally known as "Hayward's", then as "Haywood", later as "Haywards", and eventually as "Hayward". There is some disagreement as to how it was named. Most historians believe it was named for William Dutton Hayward (1815–1891), who opened a hotel there in 1852. William Hayward eventually became the road commissioner for Alameda County. He used his authority to influence the construction of roads in his own favor. He was also an Alameda County supervisor. The United States Geological Survey's Geographic Names Information System states the city was named after Alvinza Hayward, a millionaire from the California Gold Rush. Regardless of which Hayward the area was named for, the name was changed to "Haywood" when the post office was first established in 1860.

In 1876, a town was chartered by the State of California under the name of "Haywards". The name of the post office was then able to change because of the loss of the apostrophe before the "s". This change occurred in 1880. In 1911, the town was officially renamed Hayward, dropping the "s". However, the United States Board on Geographic Names would not recognize this name change until 1931.

== History ==
=== Early history ===
Human habitation of the greater East Bay, including Hayward, dates from at least 4000 BC. The most recent pre-European inhabitants of the Hayward area were the Native American Ohlone people.

=== 19th century ===
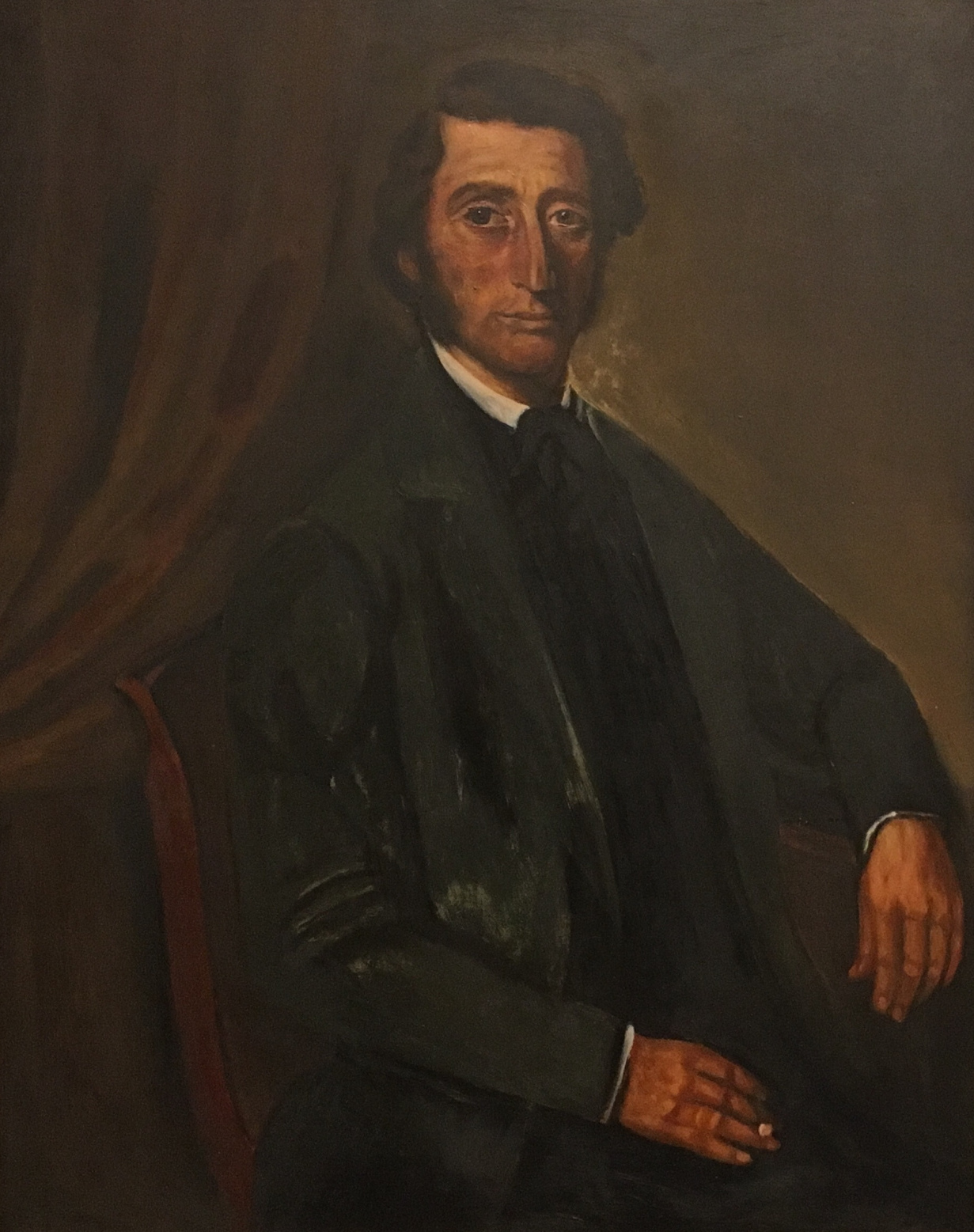
Don Guillermo Castro, a noted Californio ranchero, owned Rancho San Lorenzo, which made up the modern cities of Hayward, Castro Valley, and San Lorenzo.

In the 19th century, the land that is now Hayward became part of Rancho San Lorenzo, a Spanish land grant to Guillermo Castro, in 1841. The site of his home was on the former El Camino Viejo, or Castro Street (now Mission Boulevard) between C and D Streets, but the structure was severely damaged in the 1868 Hayward earthquake, with the Hayward Fault running directly under its location. Most of the city's structures were destroyed in the earthquake, the last major earthquake on the fault. In 1930, that site was chosen for the construction of the City Hall, which served the city until 1969. A post office opened in 1860, followed by the town's incorporation in 1876.

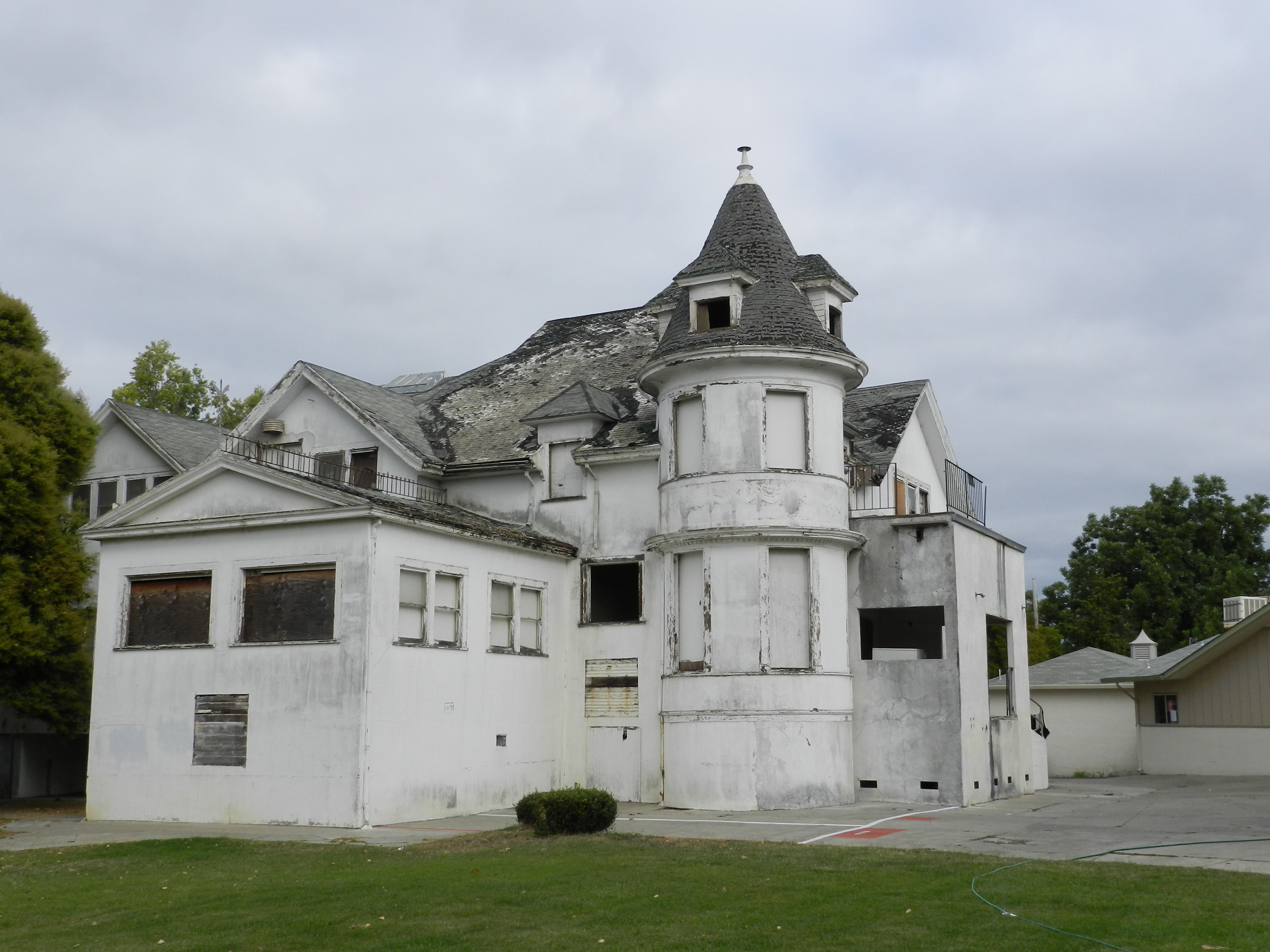
Historic Hermann Mohr home, Depot Road

Hayward grew steadily throughout the late 19th century, with an economy based on agriculture and tourism. Important crops were tomatoes, potatoes, peaches, cherries, and apricots. Hunt Brothers Cannery opened in 1895. Chicken and pigeon raising also played important roles in the economy. A rail line between Oakland and San Jose, the South Pacific Coast Railroad, was established but later destroyed in the 1868 earthquake. The Hayward shore of the Bay was developed into extensive salt evaporation ponds, and was one of the most productive areas in the world, with Leslie Salt being one of the largest companies.

=== 20th century ===
The San Mateo–Hayward Bridge opened in 1929, connecting the city to the San Francisco Peninsula.

During the 1930s, the Harry Rowell Rodeo Ranch, now within the bounds of Castro Valley, drew rodeo cowboys from across the continent, and Western movie actors such as Slim Pickens and others from Hollywood.

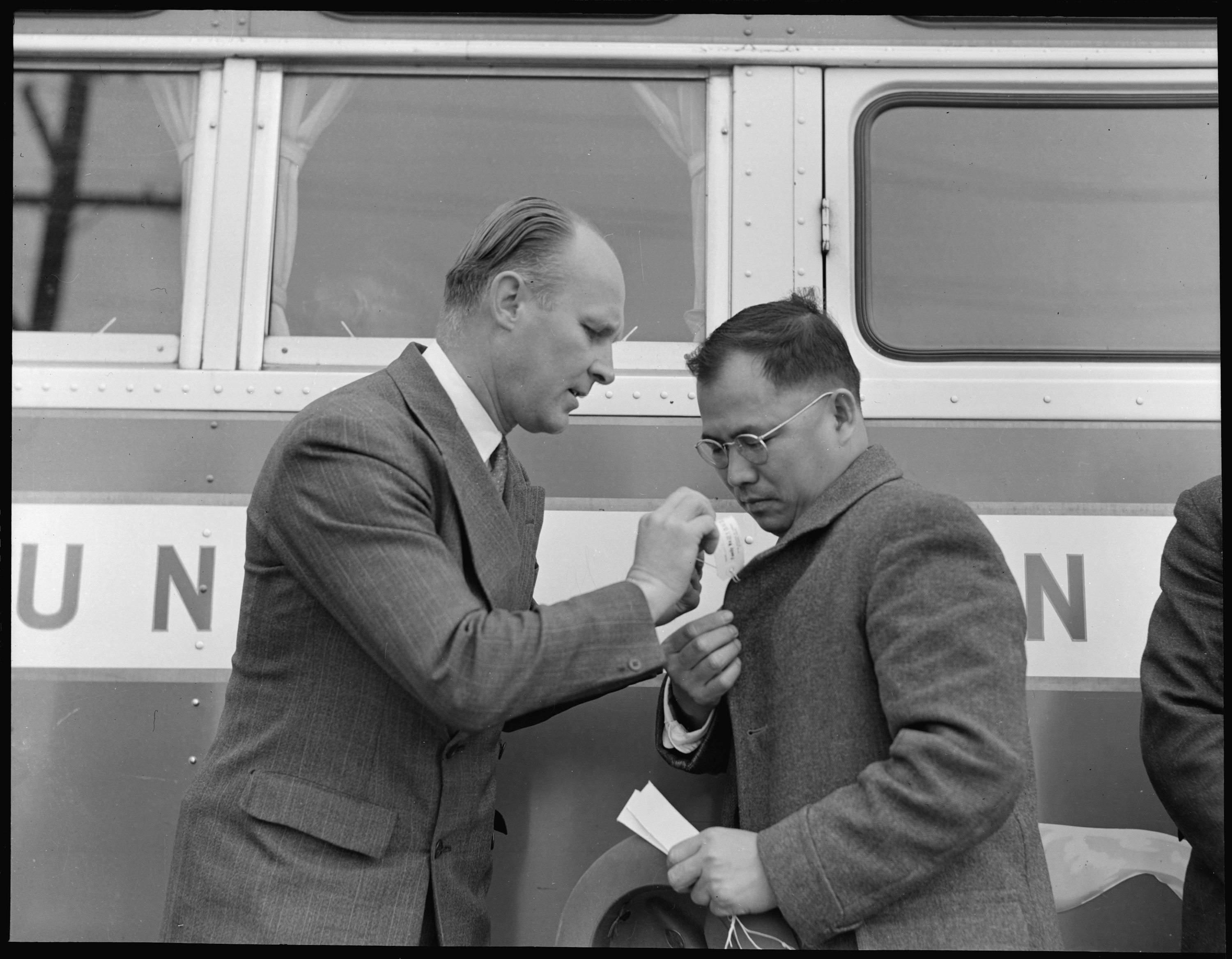
Baptist Minister John Carlos Derfelt placing War Relocation Authority ID tag on Reverend Sui Hiro of the San Lorenzo Holiness Church. Hayward, 1942

Prior to World War II, Hayward had a high concentration of Japanese Americans, who were subject to the Japanese-American internment during the war. The war brought an economic and population boom to the area, as factories opened to manufacture war material. Many of the workers stayed after the end of the war. Two suburban tract housing pioneers, Oliver Rousseau and David D. Bohannon, were prominent builders of postwar housing in the area.

The Hayward Area Recreation and Park District was formed in 1944.

California State University, Hayward opened in the Hayward Hills in 1957. Southland Mall was dedicated in 1964.

The second San Mateo–Hayward Bridge opened in 1967. The City Center Building opened in 1969 and acted as the new city hall until 1989 when the Loma Prieta earthquake damaged the building and forced the city government to move out. The building was closed to the public in 1998, with the new Hayward City Hall opening the same year. Bay Area Rapid Transit began operating in the Bay Area in 1972, with stations in downtown Hayward and south Hayward.

The Hunt Brothers Cannery closed in 1981.

=== 21st century ===
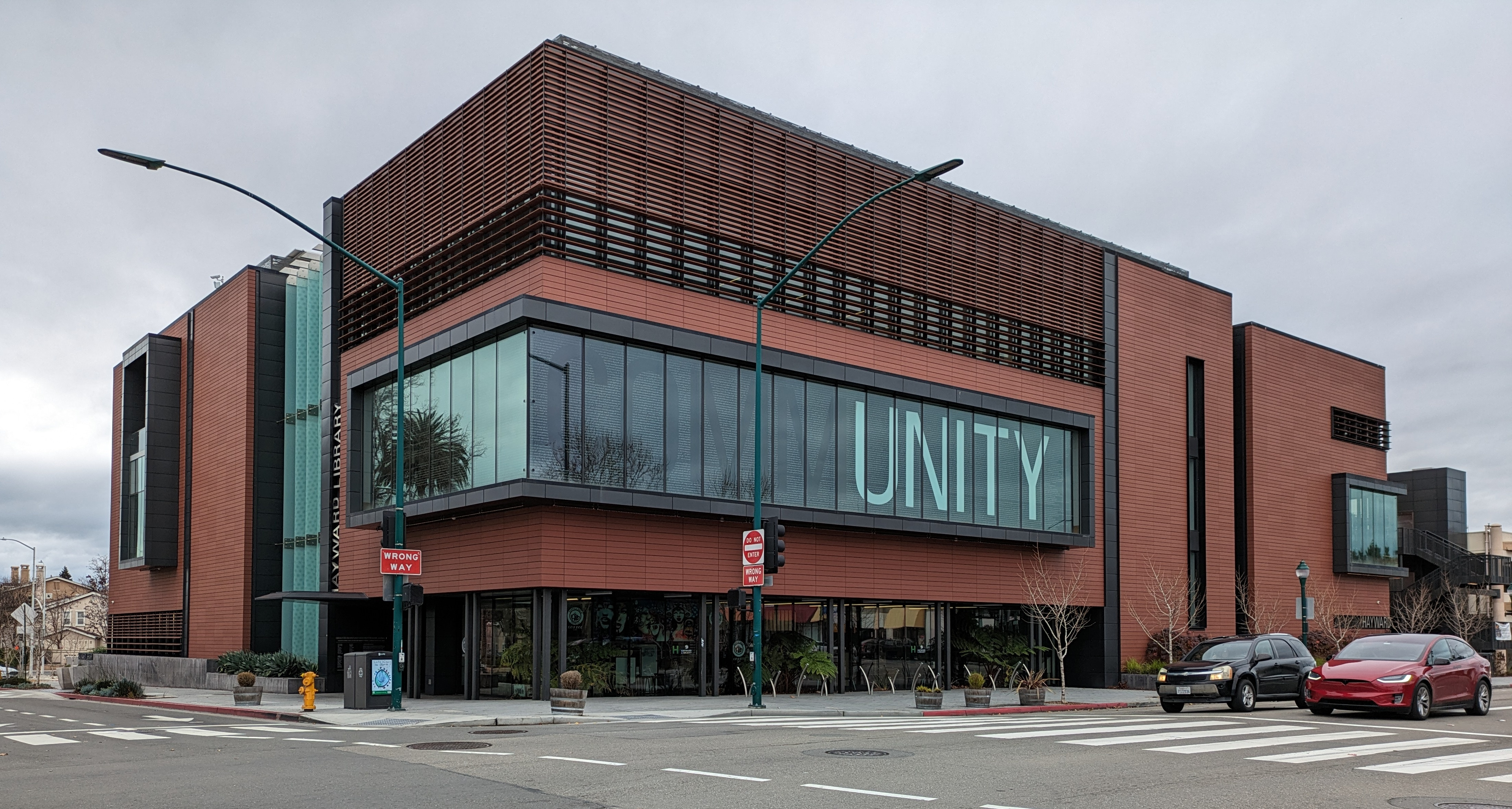
Hayward Library in 2024

The city's downtown area was slated for redevelopment in 2012 and 2013, with landscaping, new businesses opening up, and older ones getting façade upgrades.

The Warren Hall on the California State University, East Bay campus and the City Center Building downtown were demolished in 2013.

The Russell City Energy Center began operating in 2013 at the Hayward shoreline.

In May 2015, the city's former shoreline landfill was declared a site for conversion to a solar farm, set to generate enough electricity to power 1,200 homes. It will be one of 186 sites in the Regional Renewable Energy Procurement Project.

In October 2015, construction began for the Hayward 21st Century Library and Heritage Plaza. The library opened in September 2019, and the plaza was originally expected to open sometime in 2019.

== Former communities ==
Mount Eden was a former city that was incorporated into Hayward in the 1950s, at the same time as Schafer Park.

Russell City was a former unincorporated community. It existed from 1853 until 1964. It is now the location of an industrial park. The Russell City Energy Center, a 429-megawatt natural gas-fired power plant built by Calpine, is located there.

Stokes Landing, Hayward Heath, and Eden Landing were communities now within Hayward city limits.

== Geography ==
Hayward borders on many municipalities and communities. The cities bordering on Hayward are San Leandro, Union City, Fremont, and Pleasanton. The census-designated places bordering on Hayward are Castro Valley, San Lorenzo, Cherryland, Sunol, and Fairview. According to the United States Census Bureau, the city has a total area of 64.1 square miles (166 km^{2}). 45.8 square miles (119 km^{2}) of it is land and 18.3 square miles (47 km^{2}) of it (comprising 28.5%) is water. The San Lorenzo Creek runs through the city.

The Hayward Fault Zone runs through much of Hayward, including the downtown area. The United States Geological Survey has stated that there is an "increasing likelihood" of a major earthquake on this fault zone, with potentially serious resulting damage. Hayward's historic city hall lies atop the fault line and was closed due to damage from gradual seismic activity. A street curb in Hayward that ran perpendicular to the fault was used for over 40 years by local geologists to record the movement of the plates; it had drifted 8 inches (20 cm) out of alignment by the time it was inadvertently removed by the city government in 2016.

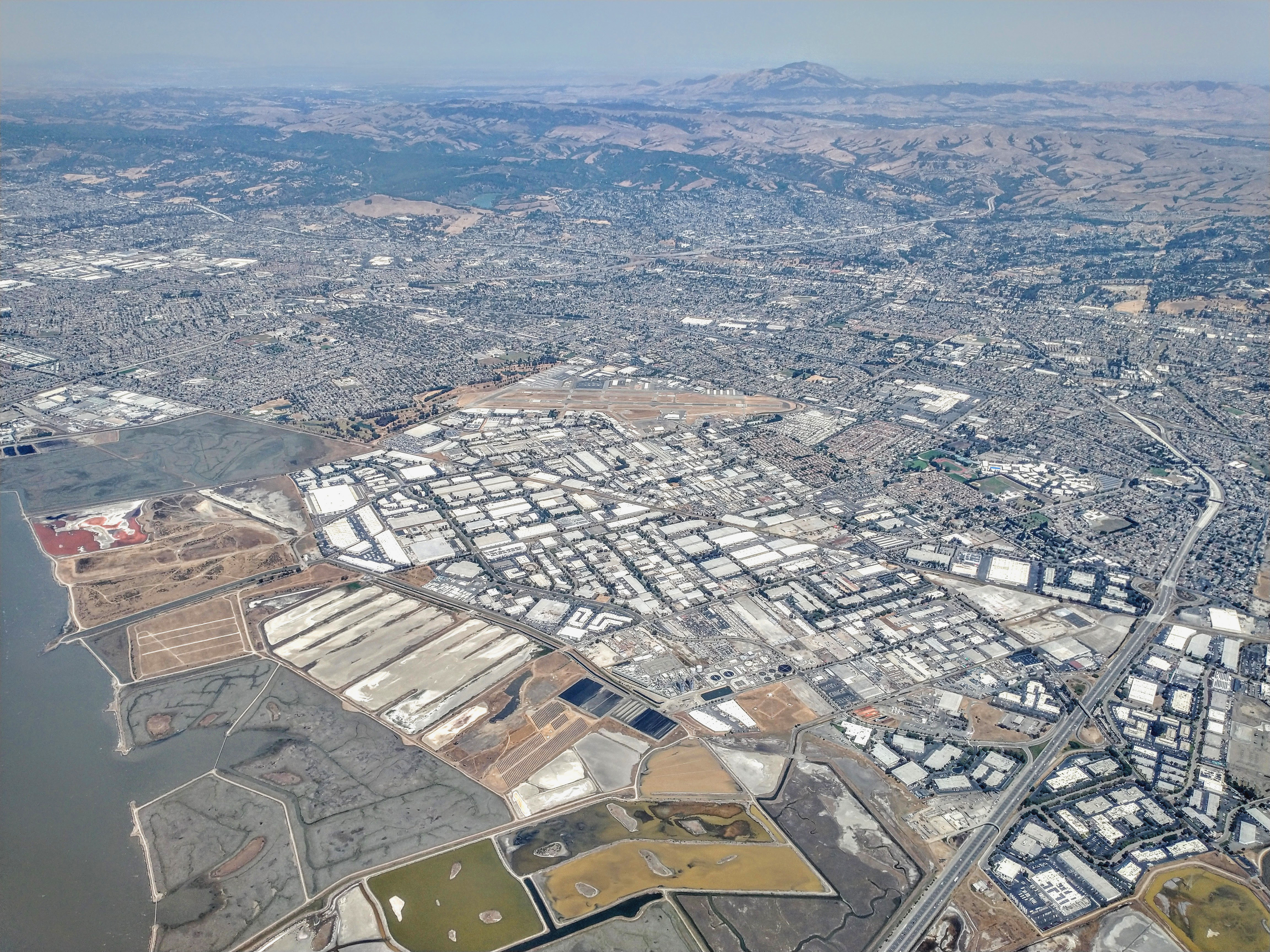
Industrial areas on west side of city

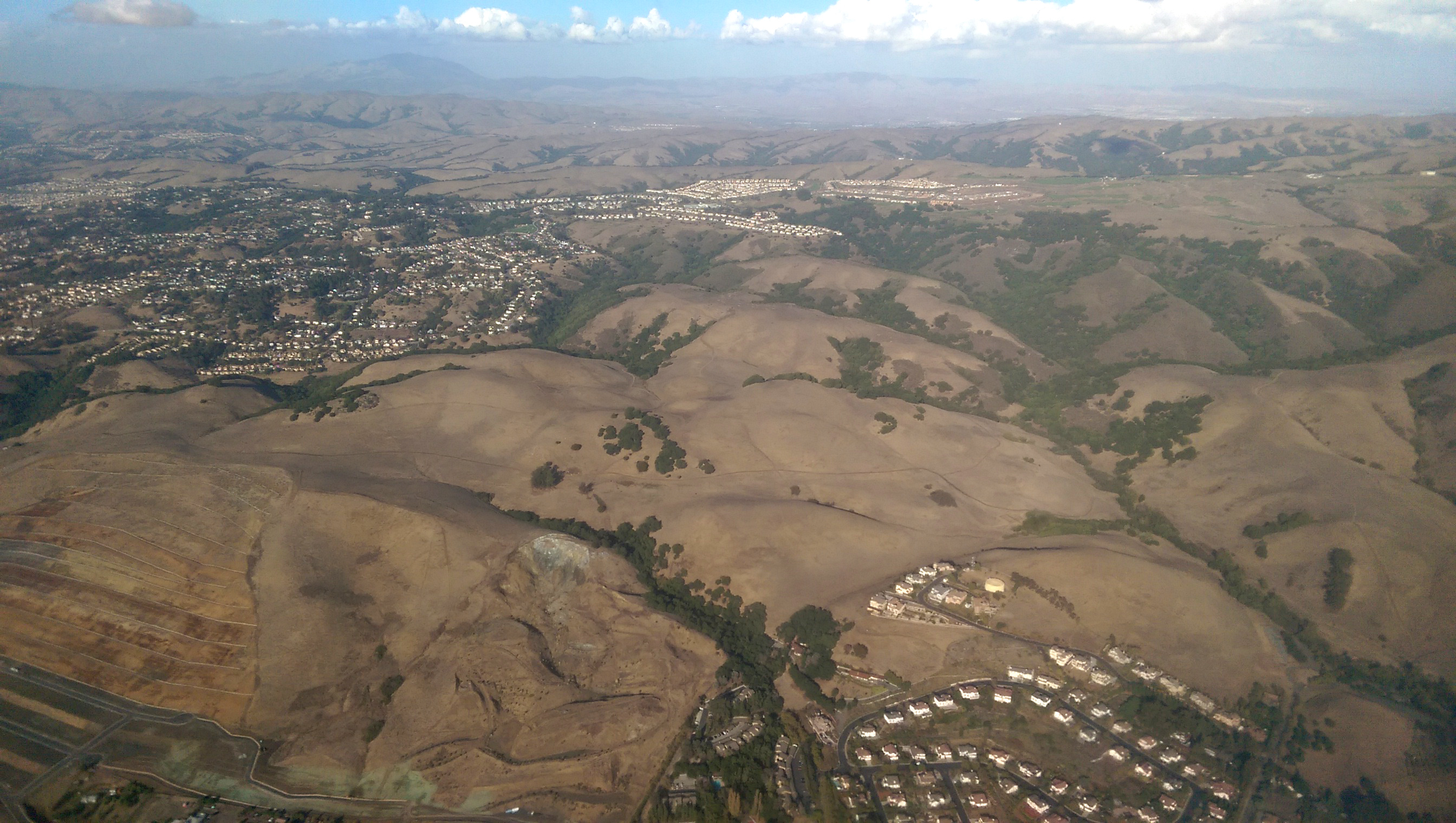
South Hayward Hills

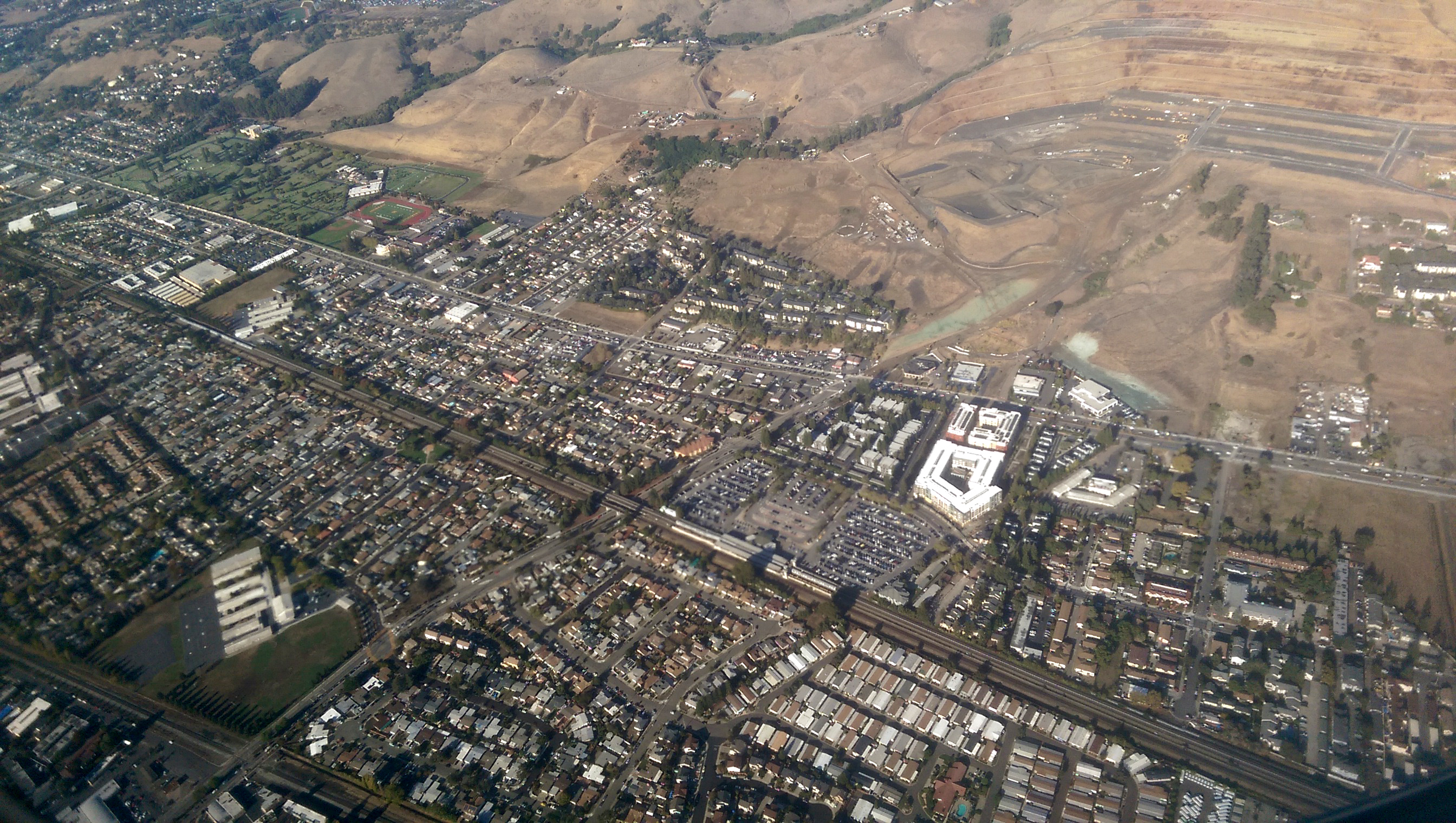
Hayward, California - South Hayward BART station and surrounding area

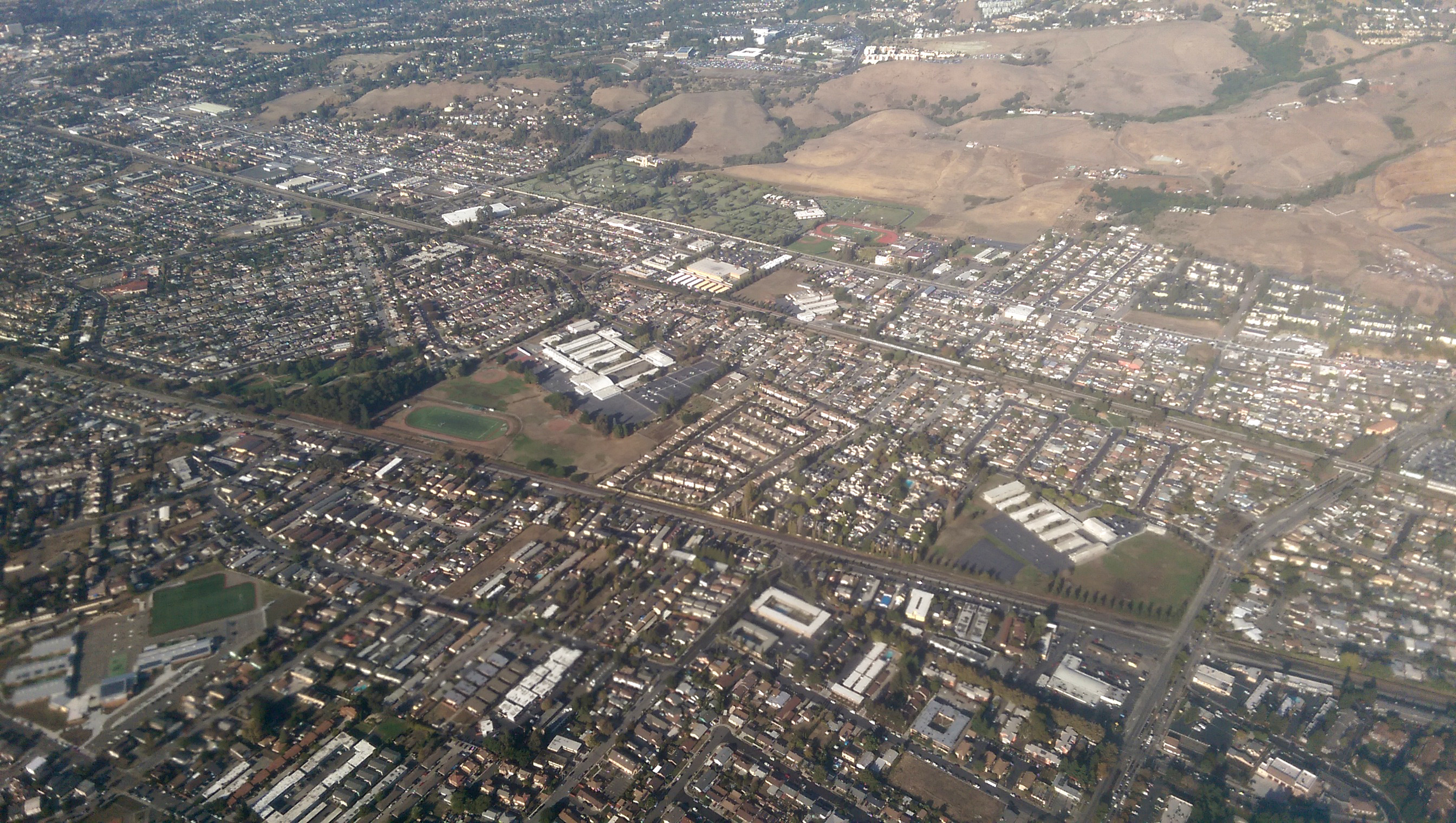
South Hayward

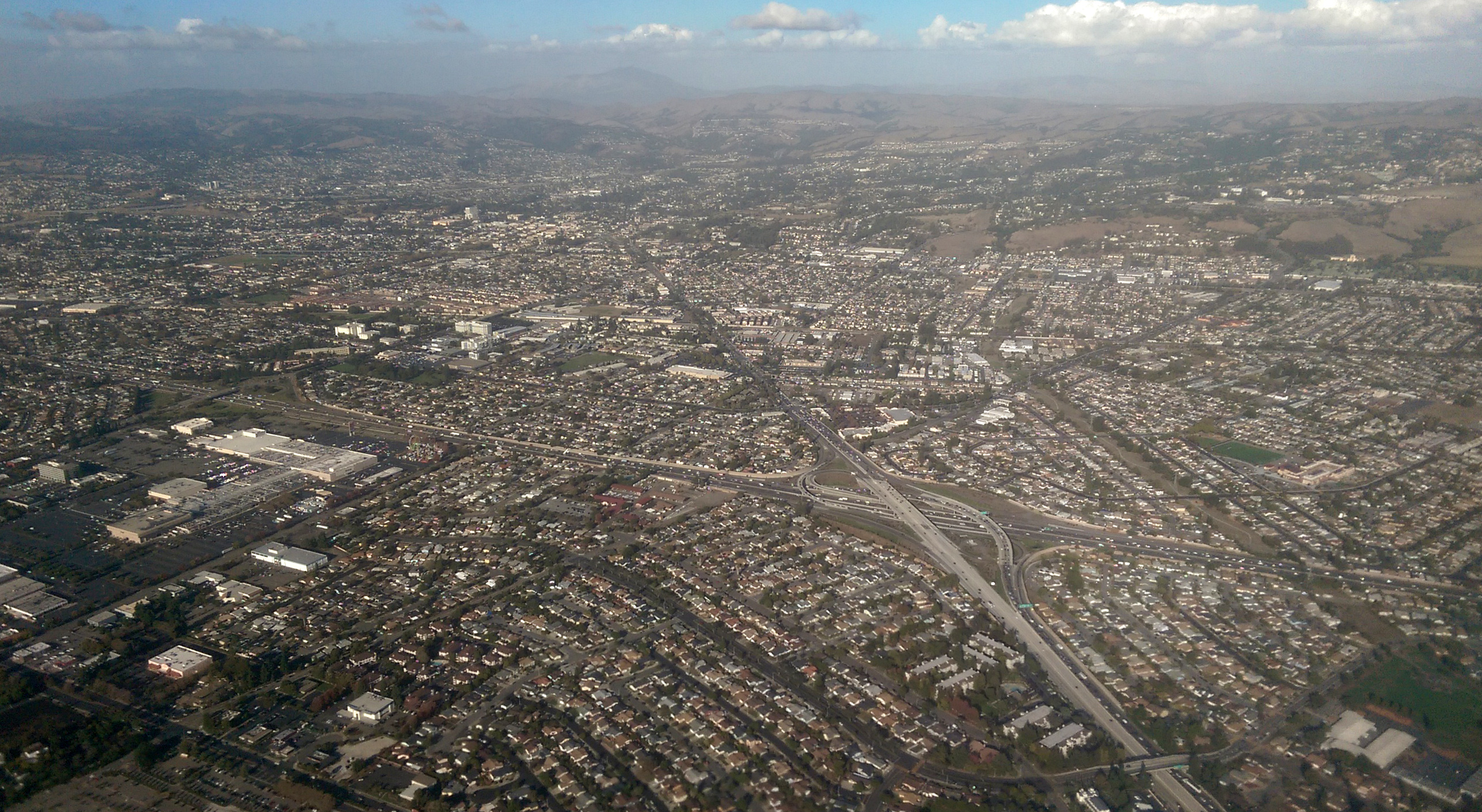
Interchange of Interstate 880 and California State Route 92

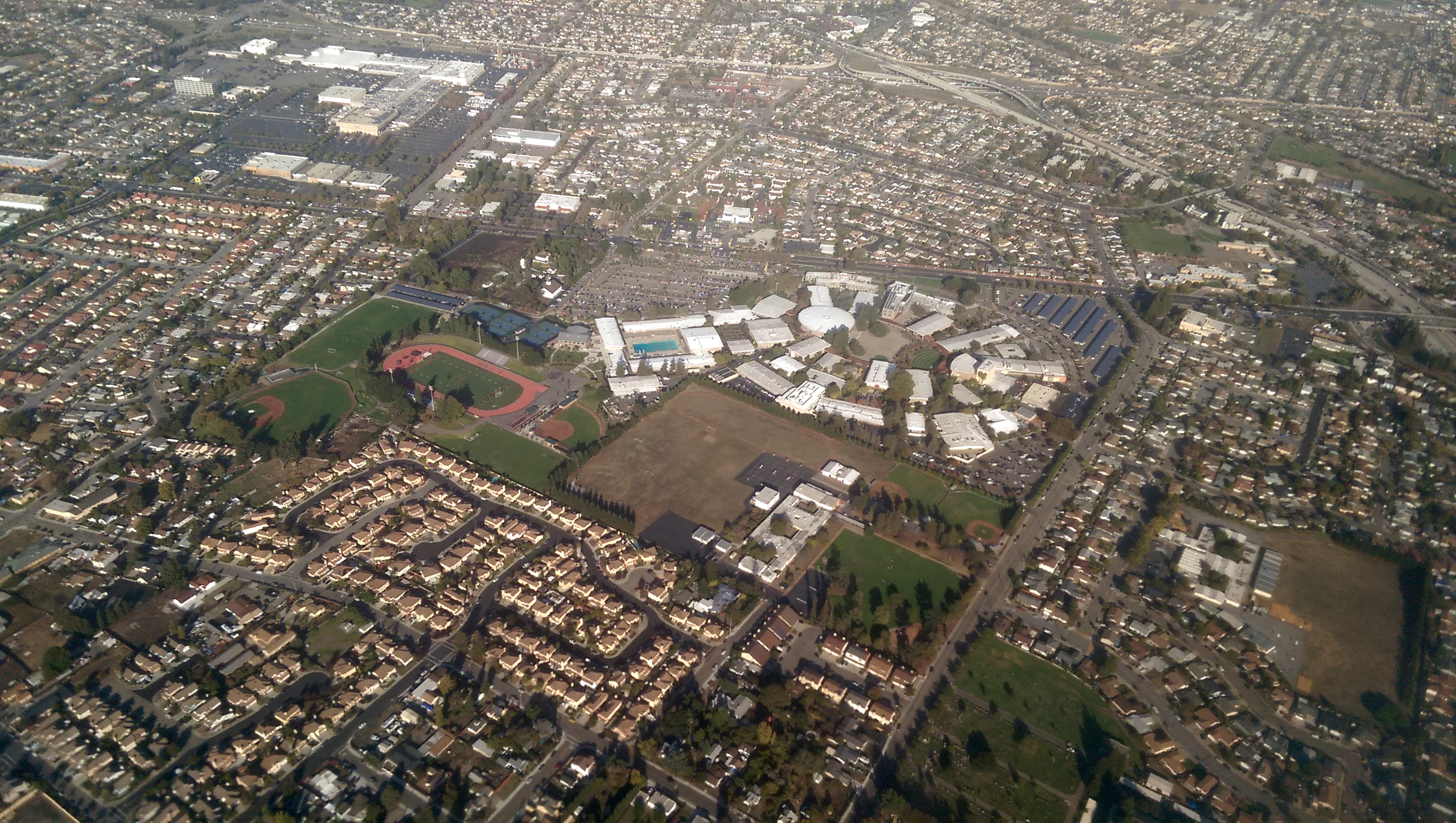
Southland Mall and Chabot College

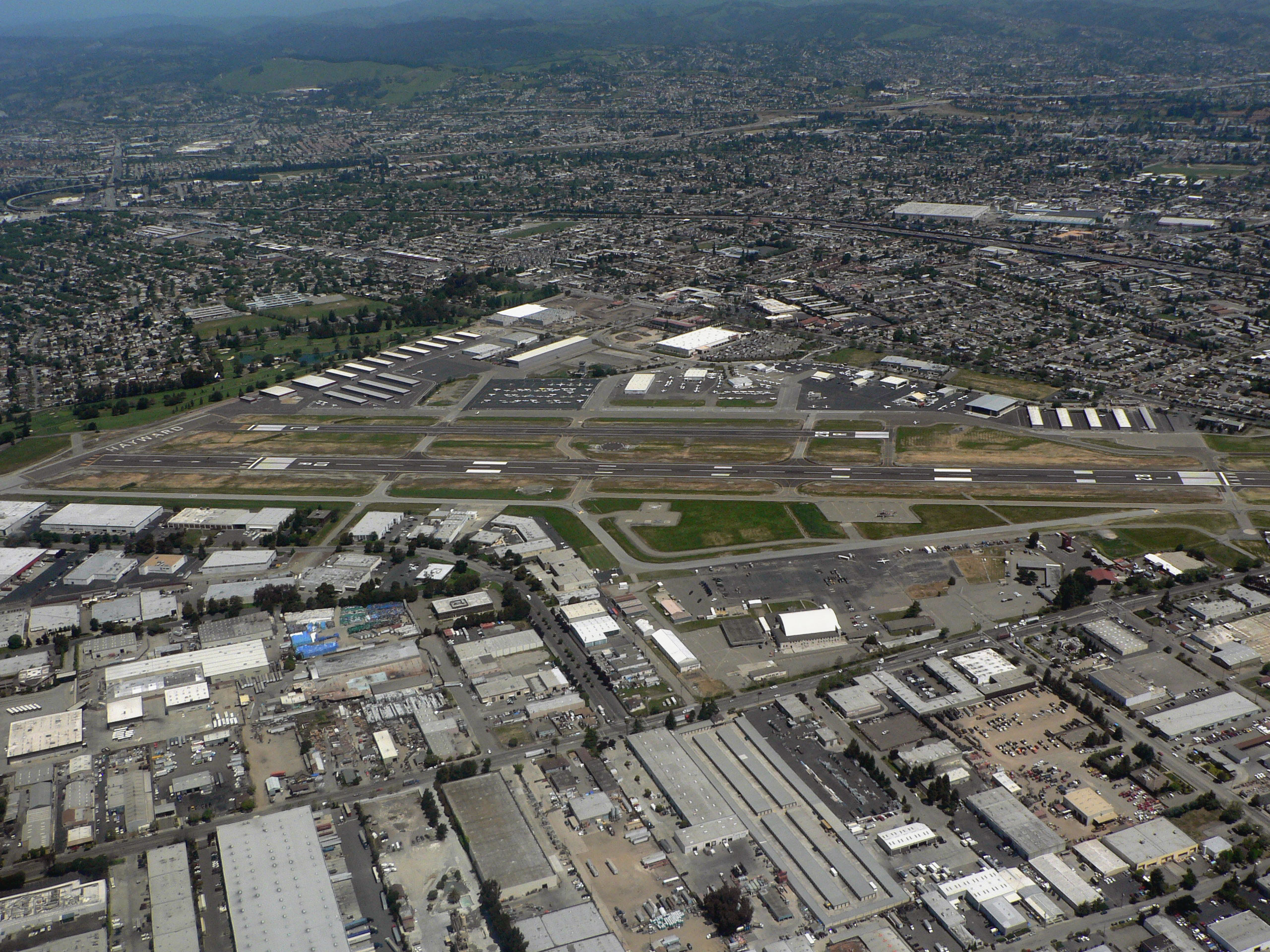
Hayward Executive Airport

=== Climate ===
Hayward has a Mediterranean climate, and contains microclimates, both of which are features of the greater Bay Area. In 2012, the USDA rated Hayward as a zone 10a climate.

Climate data for Hayward, California, 1991–2020 Normals (Note: Mean monthly maxima and minima (i.e. the expected highest and lowest temperature readings at any point during the year or given month) calculated based on data at said location from 1991 to 2020)
Month	Jan	Feb	Mar	Apr	May	Jun	Jul	Aug	Sep	Oct	Nov	Dec	Year
Record high °F (°C)	75 (24)	79 (26)	84 (29)	92 (33)	98 (37)	107 (42)	105 (41)	102 (39)	106 (41)	97 (36)	84 (29)	75 (24)	107 (42)
Mean daily maximum °F (°C)	59.3 (15.2)	61.9 (16.6)	64.4 (18.0)	66.8 (19.3)	69.3 (20.7)	74.0 (23.3)	74.7 (23.7)	76.4 (24.7)	77.0 (25.0)	73.5 (23.1)	65.1 (18.4)	59.4 (15.2)	68.5 (20.3)
Daily mean °F (°C)	51.2 (10.7)	53.5 (11.9)	55.9 (13.3)	58.2 (14.6)	60.9 (16.1)	64.6 (18.1)	66.1 (18.9)	67.3 (19.6)	67.3 (19.6)	63.5 (17.5)	56.2 (13.4)	51.2 (10.7)	59.7 (15.4)
Mean daily minimum °F (°C)	43.1 (6.2)	45.1 (7.3)	47.4 (8.6)	49.5 (9.7)	52.4 (11.3)	55.1 (12.8)	57.4 (14.1)	58.2 (14.6)	57.6 (14.2)	53.5 (11.9)	47.2 (8.4)	42.9 (6.1)	50.8 (10.4)
Record low °F (°C)	22 (−6)	25 (−4)	25 (−4)	28 (−2)	35 (2)	41 (5)	44 (7)	41 (5)	40 (4)	33 (1)	26 (−3)	21 (−6)	21 (−6)
Average precipitation inches (mm)	2.91 (74)	3.11 (79)	2.35 (60)	1.20 (30)	0.58 (15)	0.15 (3.8)	0.00 (0.00)	0.10 (2.5)	0.08 (2.0)	0.81 (21)	1.51 (38)	3.20 (81)	16 (406.3)
Mean monthly sunshine hours	165.0	182.0	251.0	281.0	314.0	330.0	300.0	272.0	267.0	243.0	189.0	156.0	2,950
Source 1: NOAA
Source 2: The Weather Channel, usclimatedata.com for Sunshine hours data

== Demographics ==
Hayward has been named the most diverse city in the United States according to a study conducted by Preply.

Historical population
Census	Pop.	Note	%±
1870	504		—
1880	1,231		144.2%
1890	1,419		15.3%
1900	1,965		38.5%
1910	2,746		39.7%
1920	3,487		27.0%
1930	5,530		58.6%
1940	6,736		21.8%
1950	14,272		111.9%
1960	72,700		409.4%
1970	93,058		28.0%
1980	93,585		0.6%
1990	111,498		19.1%
2000	140,030		25.6%
2010	144,186		3.0%
2020	162,954		13.0%
2025 (est.)	157,113	▼	−3.6%
U.S. Decennial Census; 1860–1870 1880-1890; 1900 1910 1920; 1930 1940 1950; 1960 1970 1980; 1990 2000 2010; 2020

=== Racial and ethnic composition ===
Hayward city, California – Racial and ethnic composition Note: the US Census treats Hispanic/Latino as an ethnic category. This table excludes Latinos from the racial categories and assigns them to a separate category. Hispanics/Latinos may be of any race.
Race / Ethnicity (NH = Non-Hispanic)	Pop 2000	Pop 2010	Pop 2020	% 2000	% 2010	% 2020
White alone (NH)	40,896	27,178	21,436	29.21%	18.85%	13.15%
Black or African American alone (NH)	14,846	16,297	14,003	10.60%	11.30%	8.59%
Native American or Alaska Native alone (NH)	570	492	346	0.41%	0.34%	0.21%
Asian alone (NH)	26,189	31,090	47,655	18.70%	21.56%	29.24%
Native Hawaiian or Pacific Islander alone (NH)	2,511	4,290	4,915	1.79%	2.98%	3.02%
Other race alone (NH)	692	352	913	0.49%	0.24%	0.56%
Mixed race or Multiracial (NH)	6,476	5,757	6,607	4.62%	3.99%	4.05%
Hispanic or Latino (any race)	47,850	58,730	67,079	34.17%	40.73%	41.16%
Total	140,030	144,186	162,954	100.00%	100.00%	100.00%

=== 2020 ===
The 2020 United States census reported that Hayward had a population of 162,954. The population density was 3,556.5 inhabitants per square mile (1,373.2/km^{2}). The racial makeup of Hayward was 17.2% White, 9.0% African American, 1.6% Native American, 29.6% Asian, 3.1% Pacific Islander, 26.6% from other races, and 12.9% from two or more races. Hispanic or Latino of any race were 41.2% of the population.

The census reported that 98.0% of the population lived in households, 1.5% lived in non-institutionalized group quarters, and 0.5% were institutionalized.

There were 50,215 households, out of which 37.1% included children under the age of 18, 49.3% were married-couple households, 7.2% were cohabiting couple households, 25.7% had a female householder with no partner present, and 17.7% had a male householder with no partner present. 18.2% of households were one person, and 7.2% were one person aged 65 or older. The average household size was 3.18. There were 37,088 families (73.9% of all households).

The age distribution was 21.2% under the age of 18, 10.0% aged 18 to 24, 31.4% aged 25 to 44, 24.4% aged 45 to 64, and 13.0% who were 65 years of age or older. The median age was 36.2 years. For every 100 females, there were 97.2 males.

There were 52,268 housing units at an average density of 1,140.8 units per square mile (440.5 units/km^{2}), of which 50,215 (96.1%) were occupied. Of these, 52.8% were owner-occupied, and 47.2% were occupied by renters.

In 2023, the US Census Bureau estimated that 42.0% of the population were foreign-born. Of all people aged 5 or older, 39.6% spoke only English at home, 32.1% spoke Spanish, 7.1% spoke other Indo-European languages, 19.9% spoke Asian or Pacific Islander languages, and 1.2% spoke other languages. Of those aged 25 or older, 82.5% were high school graduates and 32.6% had a bachelor's degree.

The median household income in 2023 was $113,775, and the per capita income was $44,613. About 6.5% of families and 9.5% of the population were below the poverty line.

=== 2010 ===
The 2010 United States census reported that Hayward had a population of 144,186. The population density was 2,261.8 inhabitants per square mile (873.3/km^{2}). The census determined racial and ethnic makeup of Hayward was 49,309 (34.2%) White, 17,099 (11.9%) African American, 1,396 (1.0%) Native American, 31,666 (22.0%) Asian (10.4% Filipino, 3.9% Chinese, 3.0% Indian, 2.7% Vietnamese, 0.5% Japanese, 0.5% Korean, 0.2% Cambodian, 0.1% Pakistani), 4,535 (3.1%) Pacific Islander, 30,004 (20.8%) from other races, and 10,177 (7.1%) from two or more races. Hispanic or Latino of any race were 58,730 persons (40.7%), giving Hayward an aggregate Hispanic/Latino plurality population as categorized by census determined racial and ethnic groups. 30.2% of Hayward's population was Mexican, 2.5% Salvadoran, 1.5% Puerto Rican, 1.2% Nicaraguan, 1.0% Honduran, 0.5% Peruvian, and 0.2% Cuban. Hayward is the second most diverse city in the state by Census figures. It has been ranked nationwide as highly diverse, in combination with Oakland and Fremont.

The Census reported that 141,462 people (98.1% of the population) lived in households, 1,954 (1.4%) lived in non-institutionalized group quarters, and 770 (0.5%) were institutionalized.

There were 45,365 households, out of which 18,284 (40.3%) had children under the age of 18 living in them, 21,720 (47.9%) were opposite-sex married couples living together, 7,495 (16.5%) had a female householder with no husband present, 3,344 (7.4%) had a male householder with no wife present. There were 3,037 (6.7%) unmarried opposite-sex partnerships, and 421 (0.9%) same-sex married couples or partnerships. 9,359 households (20.6%) were made up of individuals, and 3,193 (7.0%) had someone living alone who was 65 years of age or older. The average household size was 3.12 persons. There were 32,559 families (71.8% of all households); the average family size was 3.60 persons.

The city's age demographics were 35,379 people (24.5%) under the age of 18, 16,064 people (11.1%) aged 18 to 24, 44,005 people (30.5%) aged 25 to 44, 34,096 people (23.6%) aged 45 to 64, and 14,642 people (10.2%) who were 65 years of age or older. The median age was 33.5 years. For every 100 females, there were 97.4 males. For every 100 females age 18 and over, there were 95.7 males.

There were 48,296 housing units at an average density of 757.6 units per square mile (292.5 units/km^{2}), of which 45,365 were occupied, of which 23,935 (52.8%) were owner-occupied, and 21,430 (47.2%) were occupied by renters. The homeowner vacancy rate was 2.3%; the rental vacancy rate was 6.6%. About 75,039 people (52.0% of the population) lived in owner-occupied housing units and 66,423 people (46.1%) lived in rental housing units.

== Government ==
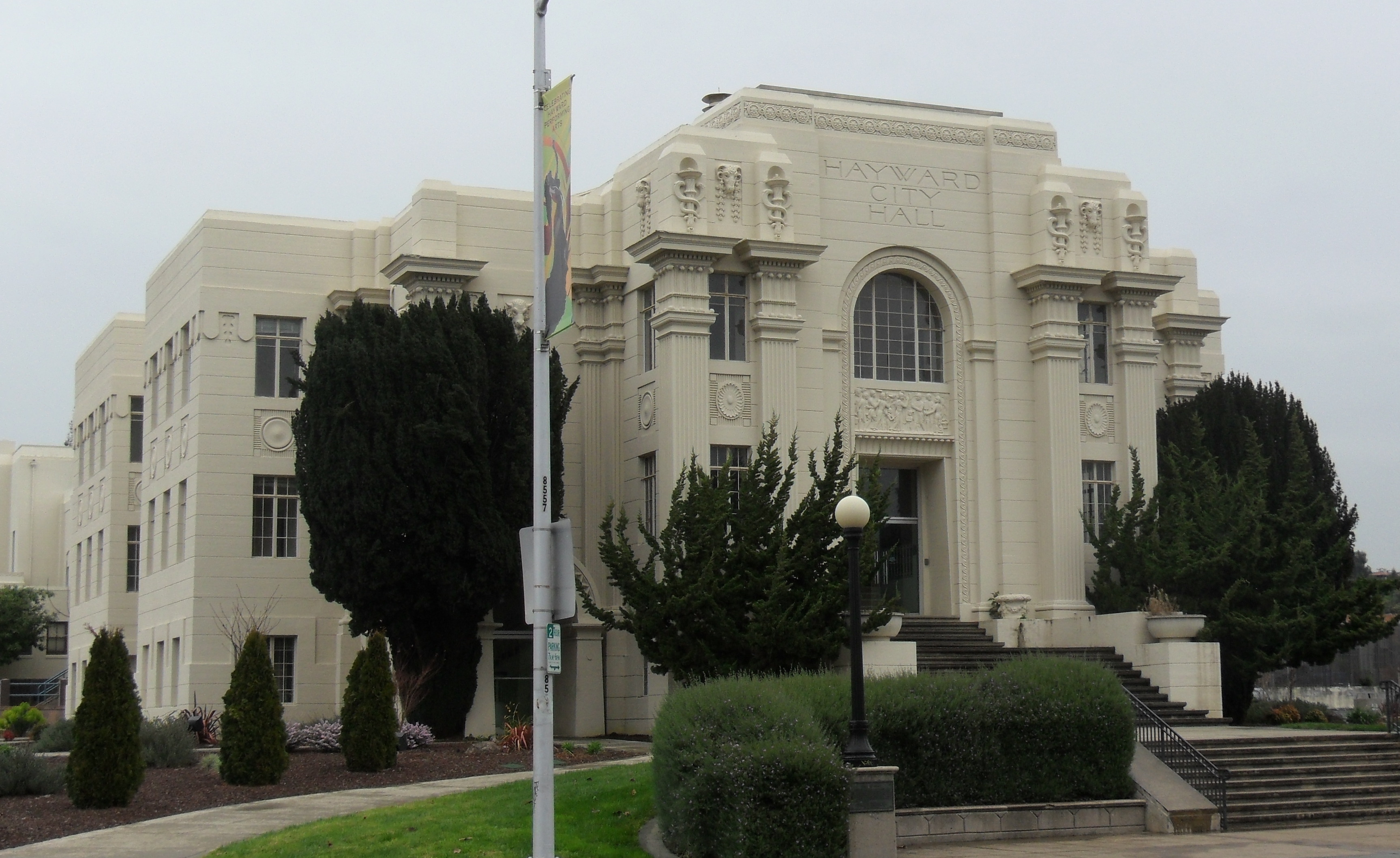
Hayward City Hall

Hayward has a council–manager government. Hayward's mayor is Mark Salinas, elected in November 2022. City Council and other government meetings are cablecast on cable TV channel KHRT-TV.

The city received an "AA", and an "AA+" rating for its general obligations, from the Fitch Group in 2012.

In July 2012, Hayward began working on an updated 25-year General Plan, which was adopted on July 1, 2014. The city last updated their General Plan in 2002.

The Hayward Hall of Justice, a branch of the California Superior Court, is the largest full-service courthouse in Alameda County.

=== Politics ===
According to the California Secretary of State, as of February 20, 2024, Hayward has 81,006 registered voters. Of those, 47,679 (58.86%) are registered Democrats, 9,850 (12.16%) are registered Republicans, and 19,130 (23.62%) have stated a "no party preference". An additional 3,879 (4.79%) are registered to various third parties.

== Economy ==
=== Manufacturing ===
Hayward has a large number of manufacturing companies, both corporate headquarters and plants. This includes some high-tech companies, with Hayward considered part of northern Silicon Valley. Manufacturing plants in Hayward include Annabelle Candy, Columbus Salame, the Shasta soft drink company, and a PepsiCo production and distribution center.

=== Retail ===
Southland Mall is the largest shopping center in Hayward.

=== Former businesses ===
==== Hunt Brothers Cannery ====
The economy of Hayward in the first half of the twentieth century was based largely on the Hunt Brothers Cannery. The cannery was opened in Hayward in 1895 by brothers William and Joseph Hunt, who were fruit packers originally from Sebastopol, California. The Hunts initially packed local fruit, including cherries, peaches, and apricots, then added tomatoes, which became the mainstay of their business. At its height in the 1960s and 1970s, Hunt's operated three canneries in Hayward, at A, B, and C Streets; an adjacent can-making company; a pickling factory; and a glass manufacturing plant. From the 1890s until its closure in 1981, Hunt's employed a large percentage of the local population. The air around Hayward was permeated by the smell of tomatoes for three months of each year, during the canning season. The canneries closed in 1981, as there were no longer enough produce fields or fruit orchards near the cannery to make it economically viable. Much of the production was moved to the Sacramento Valley. The location of the former canneries is marked by a historic water tower with the Hayward logo. A housing development now occupies much of the former cannery site.

==== Gillig Corporation ====
Gillig, a bus manufacturer, was located in Hayward for more than 80 years before moving to Livermore in 2017.

==== Other former businesses ====
Much of the Bay coastal territory of Hayward was turned into salt ponds, with Oliver Salt and Leslie Salt operating there. Much of this land has in recent years been returned to salt marshes. A 1983 image of the ponds appears on a 2012 U.S. postage stamp. The Mervyns department store chain was headquartered in Hayward until it declared bankruptcy in 2008. The Osborne Computer Corporation was headquartered in Hayward and had a manufacturing plant there until it declared bankruptcy in 1983.

=== Top employers ===
According to the city's 2015 Comprehensive Annual Financial Report, the top employers in the city were (in alphabetical order):

Employer
Alameda County Sheriff's Department†
Baxter Bio Pharma
Berkeley Farms
California State University, East Bay†
Chabot College†
Fremont Bank
Hayward Unified School District
Illumina
Impax Laboratories
Pentagon Technologies
Plastikon Industries
Siemens Building Technologies
St. Rose Hospital†

† indicates employers wholly located or headquartered in Hayward

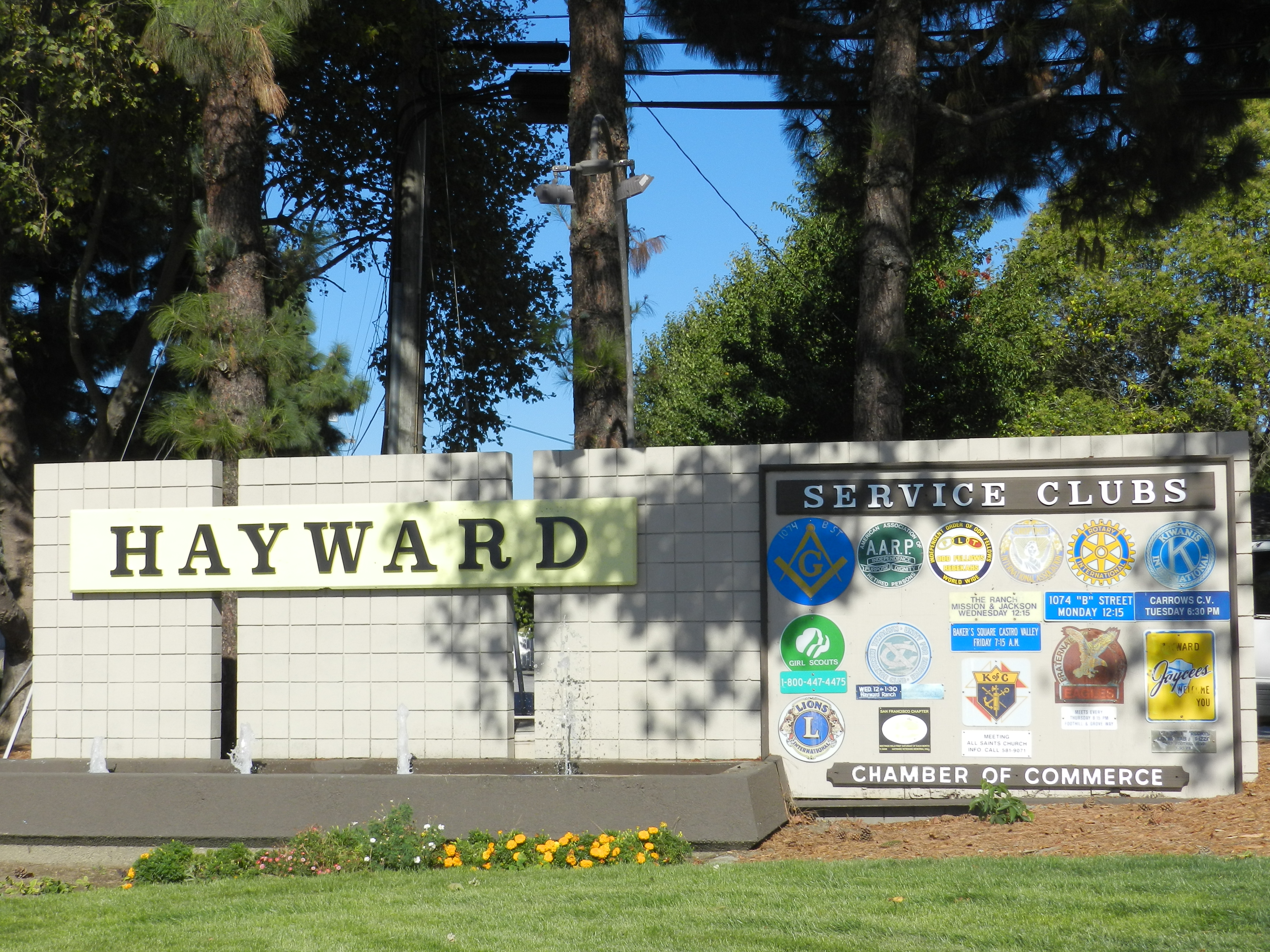
Hayward service organizations

== Transportation ==
=== Freeways ===
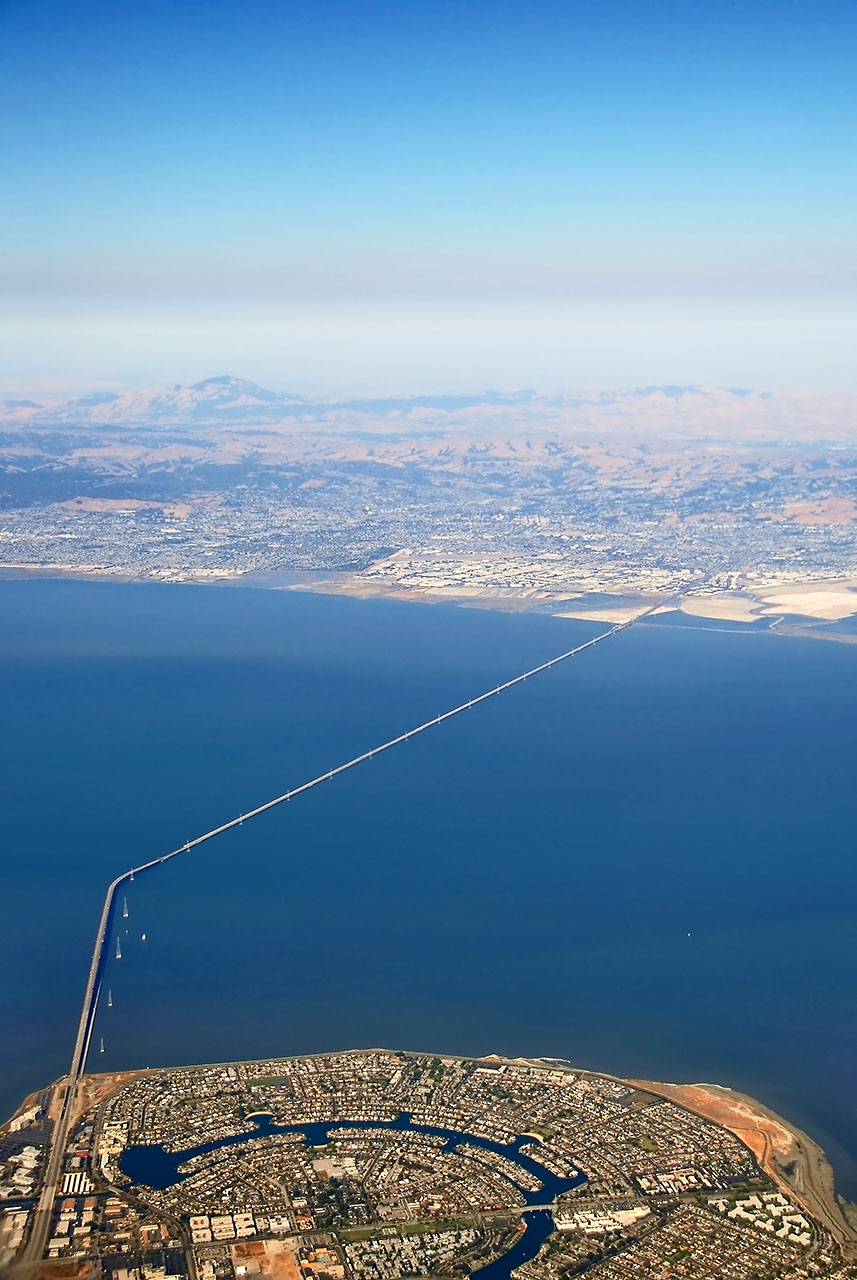
Aerial view of San Mateo–Hayward Bridge. Foster City in foreground, Hayward across San Francisco Bay, Mount Diablo in background (left).

Hayward is served by Interstate 880 (also known as the Nimitz Freeway), Interstate 580 with a major intersection near downtown connecting State Route 238 and Interstate 238, State Route 92 (Jackson Street) and State Route 238 (Mission Boulevard/Foothill Boulevard). State Route 92 continues west as the San Mateo–Hayward Bridge. The intersection of 880 and 92 was reconstructed over a four-year period, with completion of the project in October 2011. Mission Boulevard has been long known for chronic traffic congestion. Past proposals to convert Mission Boulevard to a freeway or build a 238 bypass have been controversial. One proposal, to build a freeway parallel to Mission Boulevard, extending a freeway south from 580 where it turns east towards Castro Valley, and connecting to Industrial Boulevard, had land purchased, but was cancelled in 2004 after years of debate. The land is now scheduled for sale and zoning.

Mission, Jackson, and Foothill all converge at one congested intersection south of downtown, known historically as "Five Flags" for a line of flagpoles located there. To alleviate congestion in the downtown area, the city has converted the A Street, Mission and Foothill triangle to one-way thoroughfares (counterclockwise), and is adding road improvements, landscaping, and telephone/cable undergrounding to Mission Boulevard south to Industrial Boulevard, and to Foothill Boulevard north to 580. The plan, known as the Route 238 Corridor Improvement Project, broke ground July 2010, completed rerouting in 2013, and was completed in 2013.

=== Public transit ===
Bay Area Rapid Transit (BART), the regional rapid transit system, has two stations in Hayward: the Hayward station, in downtown; and the South Hayward station, near the Hayward–Union City border. BART operates a repair yard in Hayward. The AC Transit bus system, which provides bus service for Alameda County and Contra Costa County, operates in Hayward, and has a repair/training center located there. Amtrak, the national rail passenger system, provides daily service at its Hayward station for the Capitol Corridor train, which runs between San Jose in the South Bay, and Auburn in the Greater Sacramento area.

=== Aviation ===
Hayward has a general aviation airport, the Hayward Executive Airport. The Hayward Air National Guard station was located at the airport in 1942, until being reassigned to Moffett Field in 1980.

== Infrastructure ==
Hayward maintains the Hayward Fire Department (with nine stations) and the Hayward Police Department. Hayward has its own water and wastewater systems, but a small northern portion of the city's water is managed by the East Bay Municipal Utility District. The Hayward Public Library opened at the intersection of C Street and Mission Boulevard in 1951. In 2013, plans were under development to construct a $60 million library across the street from the existing building, with funding uncertain. Construction of the library began in 2016.

=== Health care ===
Hayward has one hospital with emergency departments, St. Rose Hospital, which was at risk of closure as of 2012. A Kaiser Permanente Medical Center closed in 2014, replaced by a San Leandro hospital. Horizon Services, which administers substance abuse recovery programs in Hayward and other locations in the Bay Area, operates out of Hayward, as does the Family Emergency Shelter Coalition. The Hayward Fire Department opened the Firehouse Clinic in November 2015, the first combined fire station/medical center in California.

=== Cemeteries ===
Four cemeteries are located in Hayward: Chapel of the Chimes, Mt. Eden Cemetery, Mount Saint Joseph Cemetery, and Holy Sepulchre Cemetery, the last two being Catholic cemeteries.

== Arts and culture ==
The city created the Hayward Public Art Program in 2008, to create murals to beautify the city and combat graffiti, and has commissioned numerous murals throughout the city. The program won a League of California Cities Helen Putnam Award of Excellence in 2011.

Hayward Public Art Program mural detail (Jean Bidwell, artist)

Hayward has been a Tree City USA since 1986. Hayward declared itself a nuclear-free zone, a largely symbolic act, in 1987. The city is the setting for the Hayward Gay Prom, one of the earliest and longest-running gay proms in the United States. The city introduced road signs in 2015 encouraging better behavior while walking or driving, using phrases like "It's a speed limit, not a suggestion".

The slang term "Hella", which has spread globally, is said to have its roots in Hayward, tracing back to the 1970s.

The new Hayward Library, officially known as the 21st Century Library and Community Learning Center, began construction following a groundbreaking ceremony on October 3, 2015. The library opened to the public on September 14, 2019. This project was part of a broader initiative to create a new, modern community space while adhering to environmentally sustainable building practices, making it a net-zero energy facility

=== Downtown Hayward ===
Many of Hayward's cultural landmarks and points of interest are in its downtown area. Three city hall buildings have been built: Hayward City Hall; the City Center Building, an abandoned 11-story building and Hayward's second city hall; and the first city hall at Alex Giualini Plaza, whose architectural motifs form the current city logo.

Other downtown features include the Hayward Area Historical Society museum, which relocated and reopened in June 2014; Buffalo Bill's Brewery, one of the first brewpubs in California; Cinema Place, one Hayward's two movie theatre, with associated murals and an art gallery. Many of the Hayward Public Art Program murals are located downtown.

=== Historic landmarks ===
Hayward has two sites in the National Register of Historic Places (NRHP): the Green Shutter Hotel and Eden Congregational Church. A third site, Meek Mansion (also in the NRHP), while not within city limits, is managed by HARD and the Hayward Area Historical Society. The three sites are also on the California Register of Historical Resources. Agapius Honcharenko's Ukraina Ranch is the only California Historical Landmark in the city.

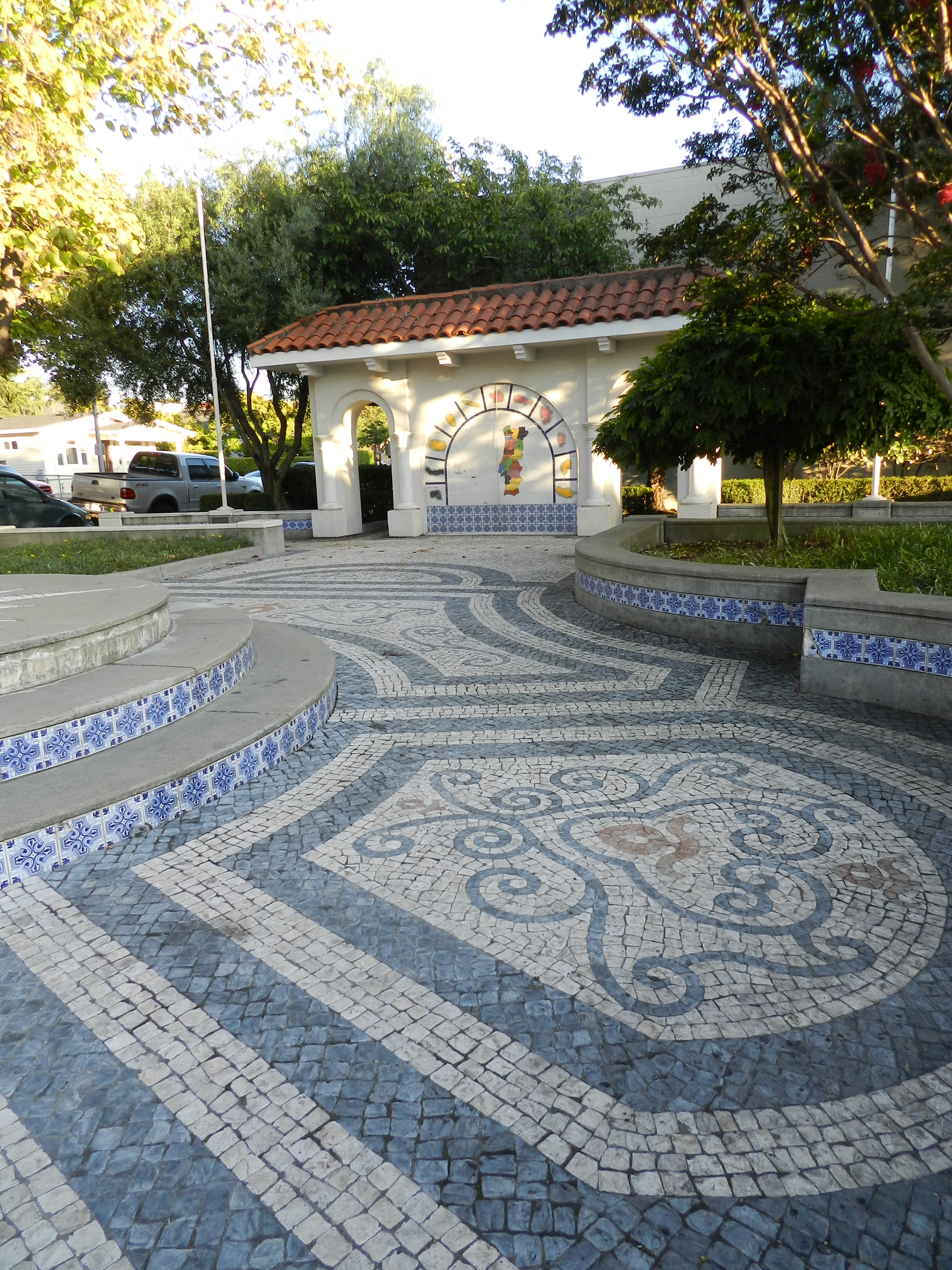
Julio J. Bras Portuguese Centennial Park

== Parks and protected areas ==
Hayward has four parks administered by the East Bay Regional Park District: the Don Castro Regional Recreation Area, Dry Creek Pioneer Regional Park, the Hayward Regional Shoreline, and Garin Regional Park. The Eden Landing Ecological Reserve is located at the Hayward shoreline, and includes 600 acres (240 ha) of salt ponds set to be converted to tidal wetlands. Hayward is also home to the oldest Japanese garden in California designed along traditional lines. The 3.5-acre (1.4 ha) Japanese Gardens was dedicated in 1980. The garden is administered by the Hayward Area Recreation and Park District (HARD), which operates a number of parks and facilities, primarily in Hayward, including Kennedy Park, the Sulphur Creek Nature Center, the Hayward Shoreline Interpretive Center, and Memorial Park with the Hayward Plunge swim center. HARD is the largest recreation district in California.

== Sports ==
The East Bay FC Stompers amateur soccer team is based in Hayward. The All Pro Wrestling professional wrestling promotion and training school is based in Hayward, and performs shows there. Hayward was briefly considered for the new home of the New York Giants baseball team in 1957, with San Francisco acquiring the team.

The Hayward Area Recreation and Park District operates the Skywest and Mission Hills golf courses. In addition to the two public golf courses, TPC Stonebrae, a private golf club, operates in Hayward. It hosts the Ellie Mae Classic (formerly known as the TPC Stonebrae Championship), part of the Web.com Tour since 2009.

== Education ==
=== California State University, East Bay ===
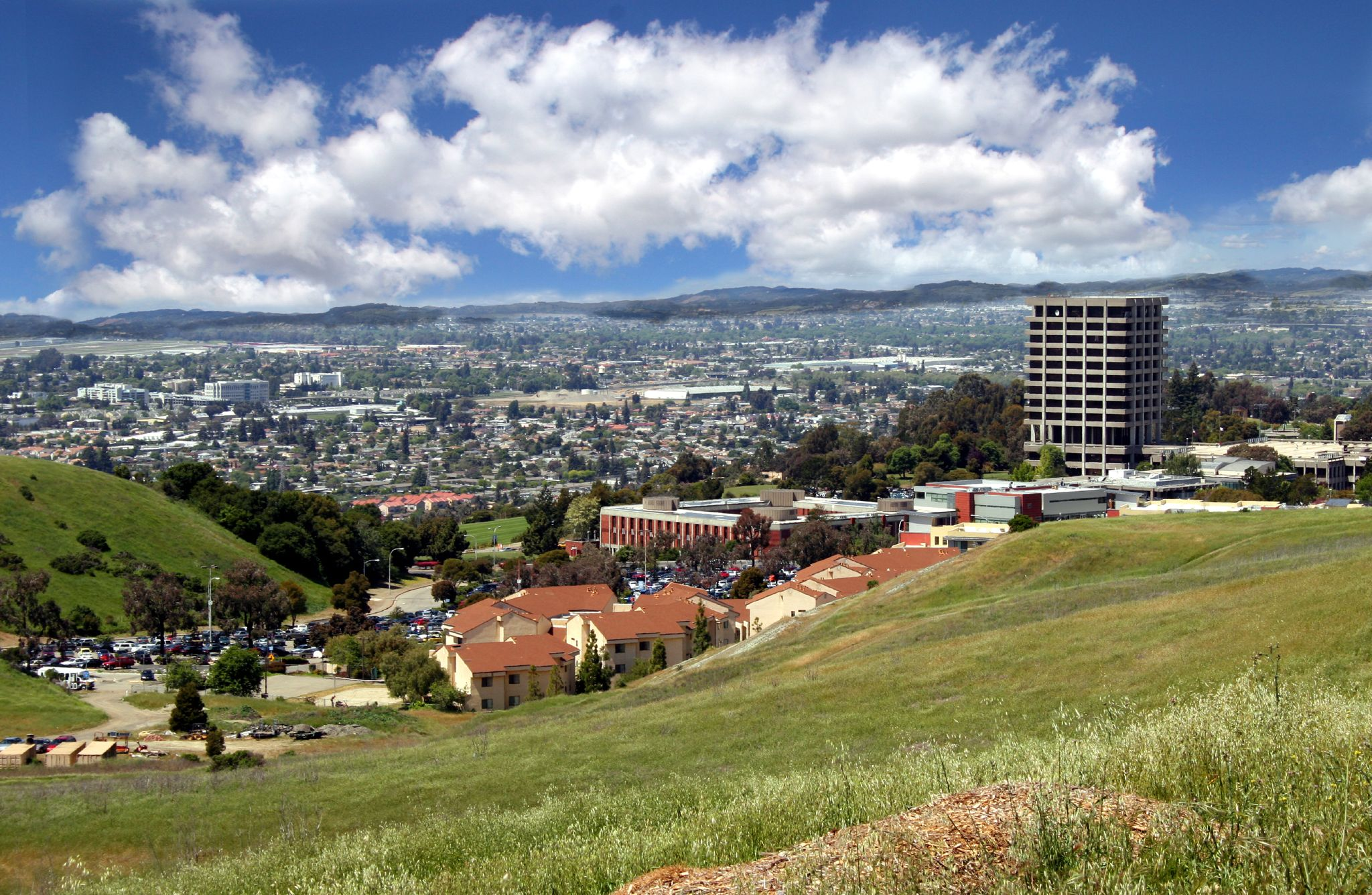
California State University, East Bay campus, overlooking Warren Hall (demolished in August 2013) and the Hayward flatlands

Hayward is home to the main campus of California State University, East Bay (CSUEB), formerly known as California State University, Hayward. It is a public university within the California State University system. Pioneer Amphitheatre is located there, and is host to public music festivals.

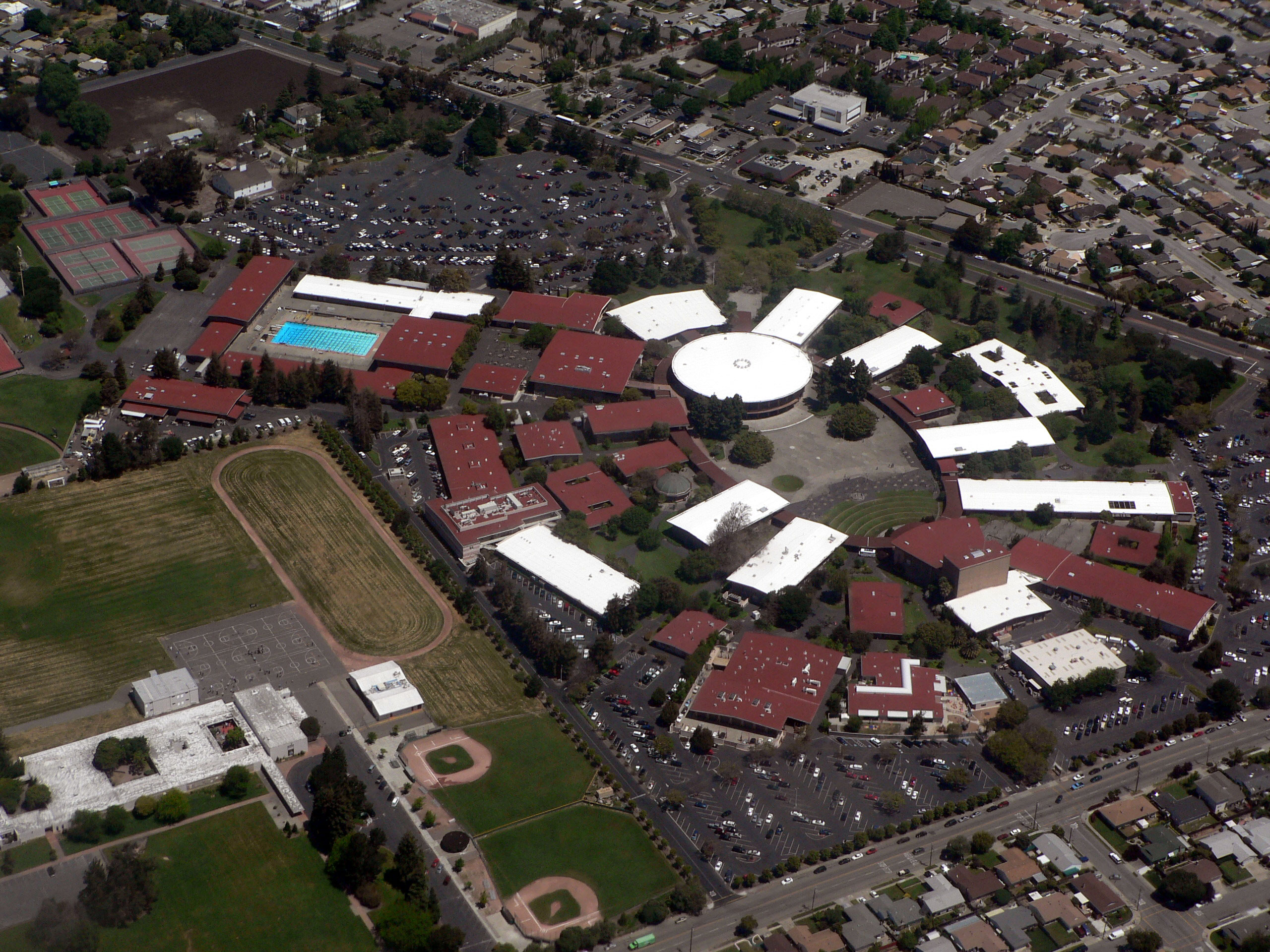
Chabot College

=== Chabot College ===
Hayward is the home of Chabot College, a community college in the Chabot–Las Positas Community College District.

=== Life Chiropractic College West ===
Life Chiropractic College is also situated in Hayward. Founded as Pacific States Chiropractic College in 1976, it is best known for its Doctor of Chiropractic program.

=== Primary and secondary schools ===
The majority of Hayward is served by the Hayward Unified School District (HUSD), which operates three high schools, Mount Eden, Tennyson, and Hayward High, all three HUSD high schools in 2018 got new football fields along with new performing arts center and other new classroom wings are planned.

Small portions of Hayward are in the New Haven Unified School District, San Lorenzo Unified School District, Castro Valley Unified School District, and Pleasanton Unified School District.

Additional high schools include the Eden Area Regional Occupational Program, the Leadership Public Schools, Hayward charter school (ranked #2 among charter schools statewide by a University of Southern California study) and the Bill and Melinda Gates Foundation charter public high school, Impact Academy of Arts and Technology. The New Haven Unified School District operates in Union City and South Hayward/Fairway park area with two schools, Conley–Caraballo and Hillview Crest Elementary. Most students in South Hayward also attend other New Haven schools and James Logan High school. The San Lorenzo Unified School District operates Royal Sunset High School within Hayward. A large private high school, Moreau Catholic High School, is located in Hayward. Promise Neighborhood grant from the United States Department of Education, through CSUEB.

== Media ==
The East Bay Echo, which publishes regularly online and prints a monthly newspaper, offers local coverage. Two newspapers of general circulation cover Hayward. From 1944 to 2016, Hayward ran a daily newspaper, the Daily Review, published most recently by Bay Area News Group. The Tri-City Voice newspaper, based in Fremont and published twice weekly, covers Hayward as well as the Tri-City area of Fremont, Newark, and Union City. It was founded in 2002. The East Bay Express weekly newspaper, founded in 1978, covers Hayward as part of its East Bay coverage. Local television stations, and AM and FM radio from Oakland and San Francisco reach Hayward, as do some stations from San Jose, Sacramento, and Salinas. The city's cable TV carrier is Comcast. California State University, East Bay's student-run newspaper, The Pioneer, has covered the East Bay since 1961. Chabot College's student radio station, KCRH, operates mostly within city limits.

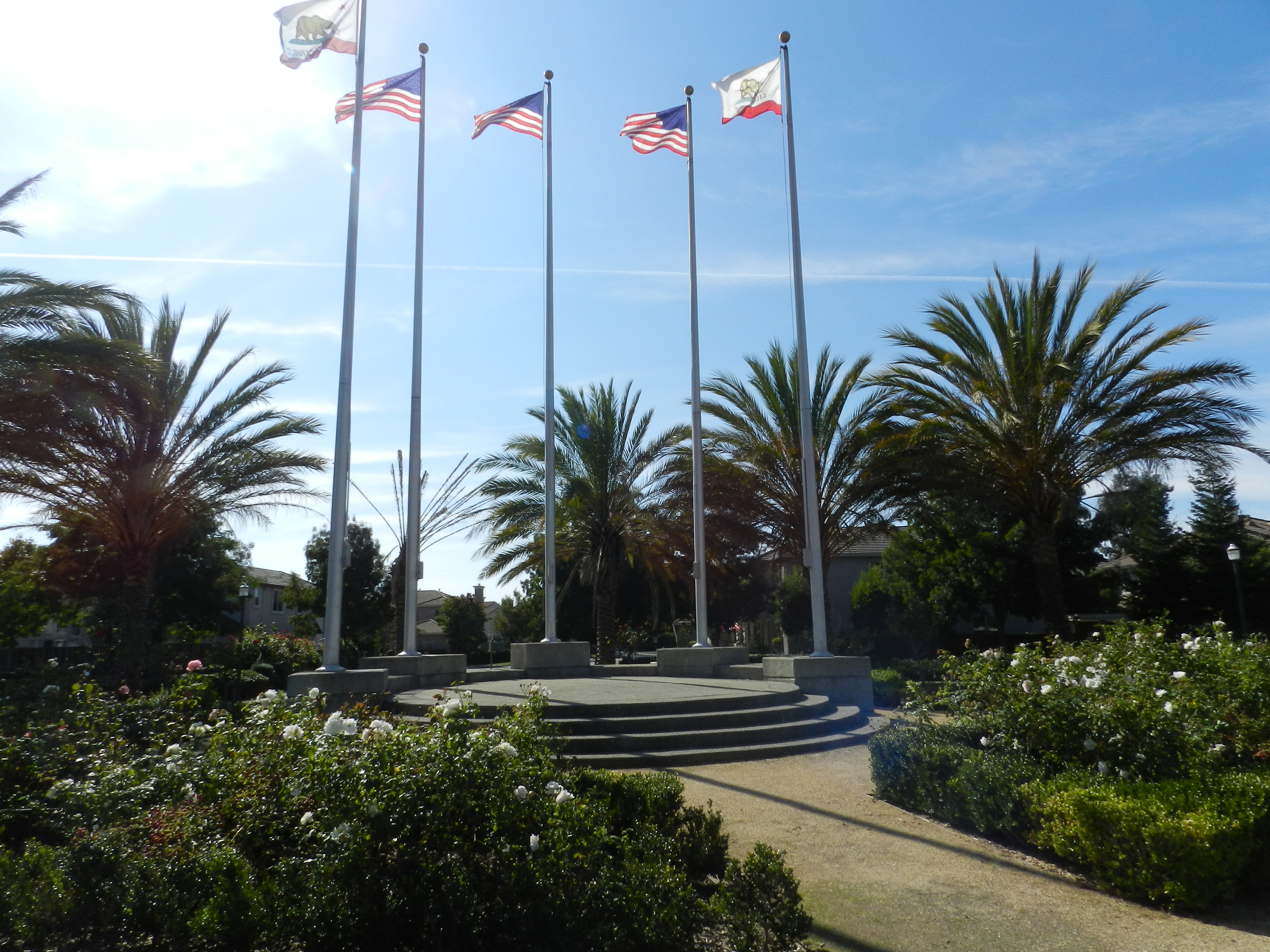
Flags, at roundabout, near Mission Hills Golf Course

== Notable people ==
People from Hayward who are strongly associated with the city include founder William Dutton Hayward and the Ukrainian patriot and Greek Orthodox priest Agapius Honcharenko, who created a farm whose location is now an historic landmark. High-profile people from Hayward include Los Angeles Sparks point guard Chelsea Gray, football coach Bill Walsh, former Oakland Raiders coach Jack Del Rio, figure skater Kristi Yamaguchi, two-time Oscar winner Mahershala Ali, professional wrestler and actor Dwayne "The Rock" Johnson, rapper Spice 1, former Treasurer of the United States Rosa Gumataotao Rios and rapper Saweetie. Charles Plummer, prior to becoming Alameda County Sheriff, was the Police Chief of Hayward.

== Sister cities ==
Hayward's five sister cities are:

- Faro, Portugal
- Funabashi, Japan
- Ghazni, Afghanistan
- San Felipe, Baja California, Mexico
- Yixing, China

== See also ==
- List of cities and towns in the San Francisco Bay Area
