= Leadership Public Schools, Hayward =

Coordinates: 37°37′30.09″N 122°5′26.56″W

Location
- 28000 Calaroga Avenue; Hayward, California; United States

Information
- Type: Charter high school
- Established: 2005
- School district: Leadership Public Schools
- Dean: Fadee Tillman
- Principal: Daniel Romo
- Teaching staff: 25
- Grades: 9-12
- Enrollment: 614 (2020-2021)
- Colors: Purple, Black, and Grey
- Mascot: Royals
- Nickname: LPS Hayward
- Accreditation: WASC
- National ranking: Gold - U.S. News & World Report
- Website: LPS Hayward Website

Leadership Public Schools, Hayward (colloquially known as LPS, Hayward) is a charter high school in Hayward, California. Founded in 2005, it is one of four schools in the Leadership Public Schools charter network in the California Bay Area. In 2011, Intel named LPS, Hayward a finalist in mathematics for its Intel Schools of Distinction program.

== Demographics ==
The 2020-2021 total enrollment was 614. Enrollment by ethnicity was: Hispanic or Latino (any race), 280; Filipino (not Hispanic), 48; Asian (not Hispanic), 49; African American (not Hispanic), 28; Caucasian (not Hispanic), 16; Other, 13. 2020-2021 enrollment ethnicity was: 65.1% Hispanic or Latino (any race), 10.3% Asian (not Hispanic), 12.1% Filipino (not Hispanic), 2.4% African-American (not Hispanic), 2.6% White (not Hispanic), 1.8% Two or more, 3.1% Pacific Islander (not Hispanic), 2.6% Not Reported.

== Courses and achievements ==
Leadership Public Schools, Hayward offers college preparatory and Advanced Placement classes. Current AP classes include: US History, US Government & Politics, English Literature, English Language, Calculus AB, Statistics, Environmental Science, Spanish Language & Culture, Spanish Literature, Psychology, and Computer Science Principles.

In 2012, a study from the University of Southern California ranked LPS, Hayward as the #2 charter school in California. In 2015, LPS Hayward earned a prestigious Gold medal by ranking 54th nationwide among charter schools in U.S. News & World Report's "Best High Schools." In the same study, LPS placed 32nd in California and 186th in the nation among all high schools.)

== Sports ==
LPS, Hayward is a member of the Bay Area Charter Schools Athletic Conference. LPS offers teams in cross country, soccer, basketball, baseball, flag football, and volleyball.
