= Schafer Park, California =

Coordinates: 37°38′38.04″N 122°5′10.63″W

Schafer Park, California was an unincorporated suburban community absorbed into Hayward, California, at the same time as the acquisition of Mount Eden. It was named for A.W. Schafer, a German immigrant who purchased land in the area in the 1860s. The family sold its land to a real estate developer in the 1950s. Schafer Park was located between Hayward and Mount Eden.
