= Southland Mall (Hayward, California) =

Shopping mall in Hayward, California

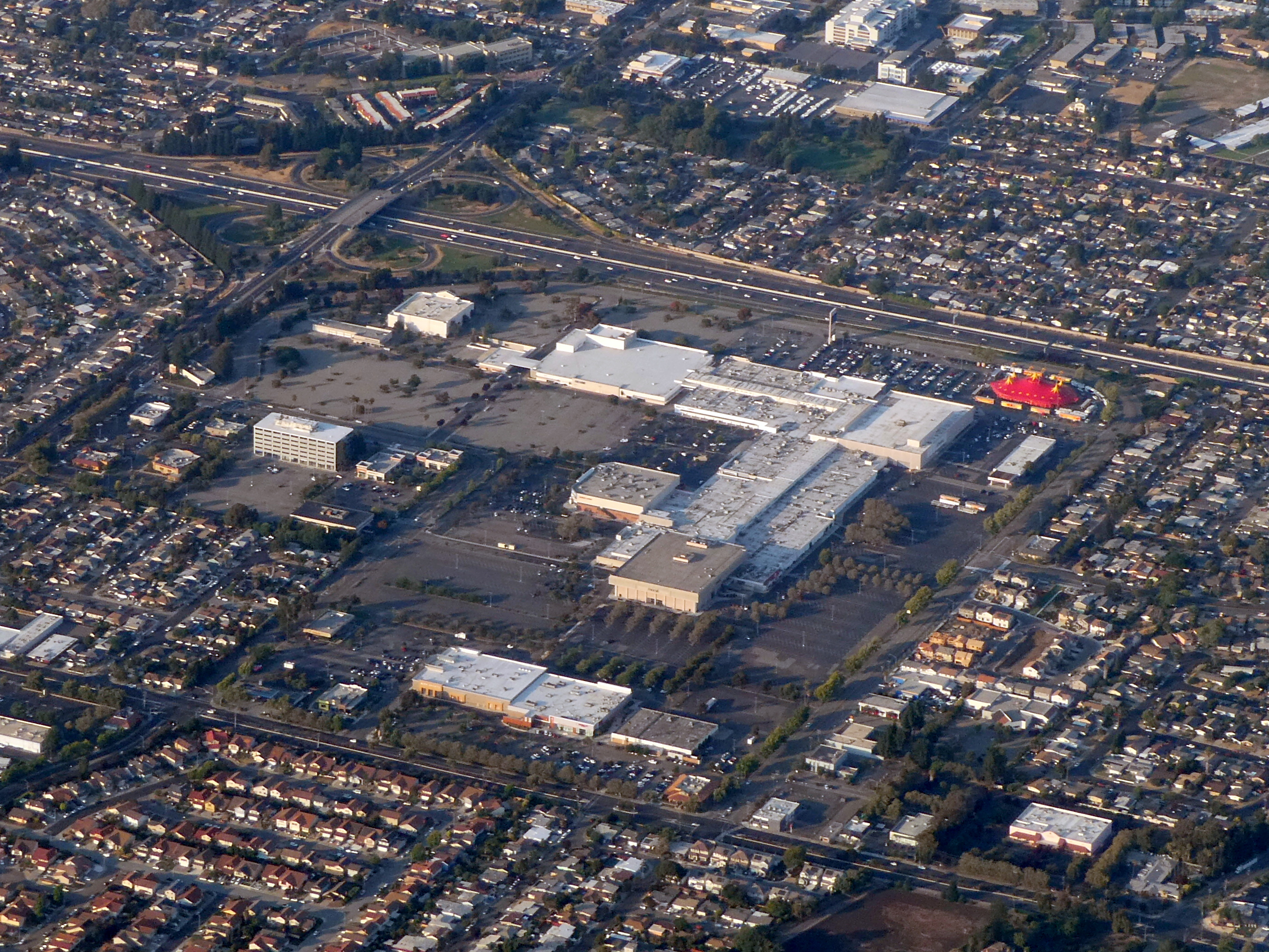
- Aerial view of the Southland Mall in 2024
- Location: Hayward, California, United States
- Coordinates: 37.650890°N 122.104806°W
- Address: 1 Southland Drive
- Opened: 1964; 62 years ago
- Developer: Taubman Company
- Manager: Mason Asset Management
- Owner: Namdar Realty Group
- Num. of stores: 100
- Num. of anchor tenants: 6
- Floor area: 786,391 square feet (73,058.1 m^{2})
- Floors: 1 with partial lower level (2 in anchors)
- Parking: Parking lot
- Website: www.southlandmall.com

Southland Mall is a shopping mall in Hayward, California owned and managed by Namdar Realty Group and its partner, Mason Asset Management as of November 2025. The previous owner was Brookfield Properties. The mall is anchored by JCPenney, and Macy's (formerly Liberty House). There is only one vacant anchor left by Sears, Hobby Lobby recently moved into the former Dick's Sporting Goods, which prior to Dick's was Kohl's, and way before Mervyn's. The mall is primarily a single-level structure, with a small lower level beneath JCPenney, a Cinemark movie theater, and free standing restaurants in the outlying parking areas. The center is located off Interstate 880 at Winton Avenue, at the western end of the city.

On July 10, 2020, it was announced that Sears would be closing as part of a plan to close 28 stores nationwide.

Most of Southland was developed in the early 1960s. The site incorporated a freestanding Sears location and a few other stores operating as the Palma Ceia Center (Palma Ceia being Portuguese for "Palm Supper", a reflection of the ethnic Portuguese heritage of Oakland and its newly developing suburbs) and a $20 million expansion program was announced in the fall of 1963, in which the facility would become an enclosed mall. The Taubman Company was the primary developer (the developer of Chicago's Evergreen Plaza was also a partner) and John Graham (the architect of Seattle's Space Needle) the primary architect.
