= Regional Renewable Energy Procurement Project =

The Regional Renewable Energy Procurement Project is an energy project in the San Francisco Bay Area, set to develop 186 sites that will generate a total of 31 megawatts, enough electricity for more than 6,000 residences. The project is expected to create more than 800 jobs. In May 2015, Gina McCarthy, head of the federal Environmental Protection Agency, presided over a dedication ceremony at the first designated site for the project, at the location of Hayward's former landfill, next to the Hayward Regional Shoreline.
