= Agapius Honcharenko =

Ukrainian political émigré, Eastern Orthodox priest, and newspaper publisher

- Агапій Гончаренко
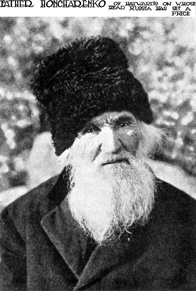
- Agapius Honcharenko in 1911
- Born: Andrii Onufriiovych Humnytskyi; August 31, 1832; Kryva, Russian Empire (now Ukraine)
- Died: May 5, 1916 (aged 83)
- Resting place: "Ukraina," Garin Park, Haywood, California; 37.64050183956677°N 122.00977383701996°W
- Occupations: Orthodox Christian priest, scholar, humanitarian

Reverend Agapius Honcharenko (Note: Ukrainian: Агапій Гончаренко, romanized: Ahapii Honcharenko) (August 31, 1832 – May 5, 1916, born Andrii Onufriiovych Humnytskyi) (Note: Ukrainian: Андрій Онуфрійович Гумницький, romanized: Andrii Onufriiovych Humnytskyi) was a Ukrainian patriot and exiled Orthodox Christian priest. He was a prominent scholar, humanitarian, and early champion for human rights.

Born to a prominent Cossack family (he was a descendant of Ivan Bohun) in Kryva, Tarascha county, in Kyiv Oblast, Honcharenko was the first Ukrainian political émigré to arrive in the United States. He graduated from the Kyiv Theological Seminary and entered the Kyiv Pechersk Lavra. He was sent to Athens in 1857 to serve as deacon at the embassy's church, where he began to contribute anonymous articles to Alexander Herzen's London-based Kolokol that clamored for the emancipation of Russian serfs and denounced his own church for supporting such an unequal system. These articles caused much unrest in Russia, and after months of trying to determine the identity of the mystery writer, Russian authorities discovered and arrested him in 1860. He was able to escape from the Russian prison in Constantinople by disguising himself as a Turk and walking out the front door.

After his escape, he traveled to London to rejoin the Kolokol staff until the newspaper discontinued publication upon the freeing of the serfs, then returned to Athens again. Afterwards, he traveled extensively to Syria, Jerusalem, Egypt and Turkey. While in Alexandria, he served as confessor to Leo Tolstoy. Returning to London, he met Italian patriot Giuseppe Mazzini, who advised him to immigrate to the United States, which he did in 1865. After his arrival, he traveled around the country, first to Philadelphia where he met the woman who would become his wife. In New York City, he established the first Orthodox liturgy in the U.S. outside of Alaska. He also helped establish a Greek Orthodox church in New Orleans and did work in Alaska before finally settling in San Francisco. Before immigrating, he had changed his name to protect his family from persecution for his anti-Russian writings. Through his travels, he became friends with many notable Americans, among them Eugene Schuyler, Horace Greeley, Charles R. Dana, Hamilton Fish, Henry Wager Halleck, William H. Seward and Henry George.

A plain-spoken man, Honcharenko was known to openly denounce his own church for corruption, immorality, and other failings, so much so that he was declared a schismatic. While living in San Francisco, he published The Alaska Herald, aimed at Russian residents of Alaska, from 1868 to 1872, which included both Russian and Ukrainian supplements. The Ukrainian supplement titled Svoboda (Свобода : Freedom) was the first Ukrainian-language newspaper in the U.S.

After founding a farm, "Ukraina Ranch", located in Hayward, California, in 1873, he continued to publish political literature, which was smuggled into Czarist Russia. These actions made him a thorn in the side of pro-Tsarist Russians, who called his writings "the drivelling [sic] of a half crazy old man." Honcharenko’s submission to the Narod aroused the curiosity of waves of Ukrainian immigrants to North America, inspiring a group of Ukrainians in Canada to establish a communal colony on his farmstead in 1900-1902, named "The Ukrainian Brotherhood." According to Jars Balan of the University of Alberta, "some members of the Brotherhood saw the communal experiment as a cooperative, others saw it as a Cossack brotherhood, and still others as a commune".

In 1890, Charles Howard Shinn interviewed Honcharenko for the Christian Union. He described their home and his history. Honcharenko and his wife Albina are buried on the farm, which is now registered as California Historical Landmark #1025, located in Garin Regional Park near California State University, Hayward. California State Historic Landmark - Garin Regional Park - Ukraina - was unveiled here on Saturday, May 15, 1999, and dedicated to the Ukrainian American community of northern California. it took over 30 years for the local Ukrainian community to dedicate the former Honcharenko homestead in his honor. The site immortalizes the Rev. Agapius Honcharenko, blending a deeply spiritual life with his love of the earth.
