= Garin Regional Park =

Park in California, United States

Coordinates: 37.63544°N 122.02068°W

- Interactive map of Garin Regional Park
- Location: Alameda County, California
- Nearest city: Hayward, California
- Created: 1966
- Operator: East Bay Regional Park District
- Status: Open

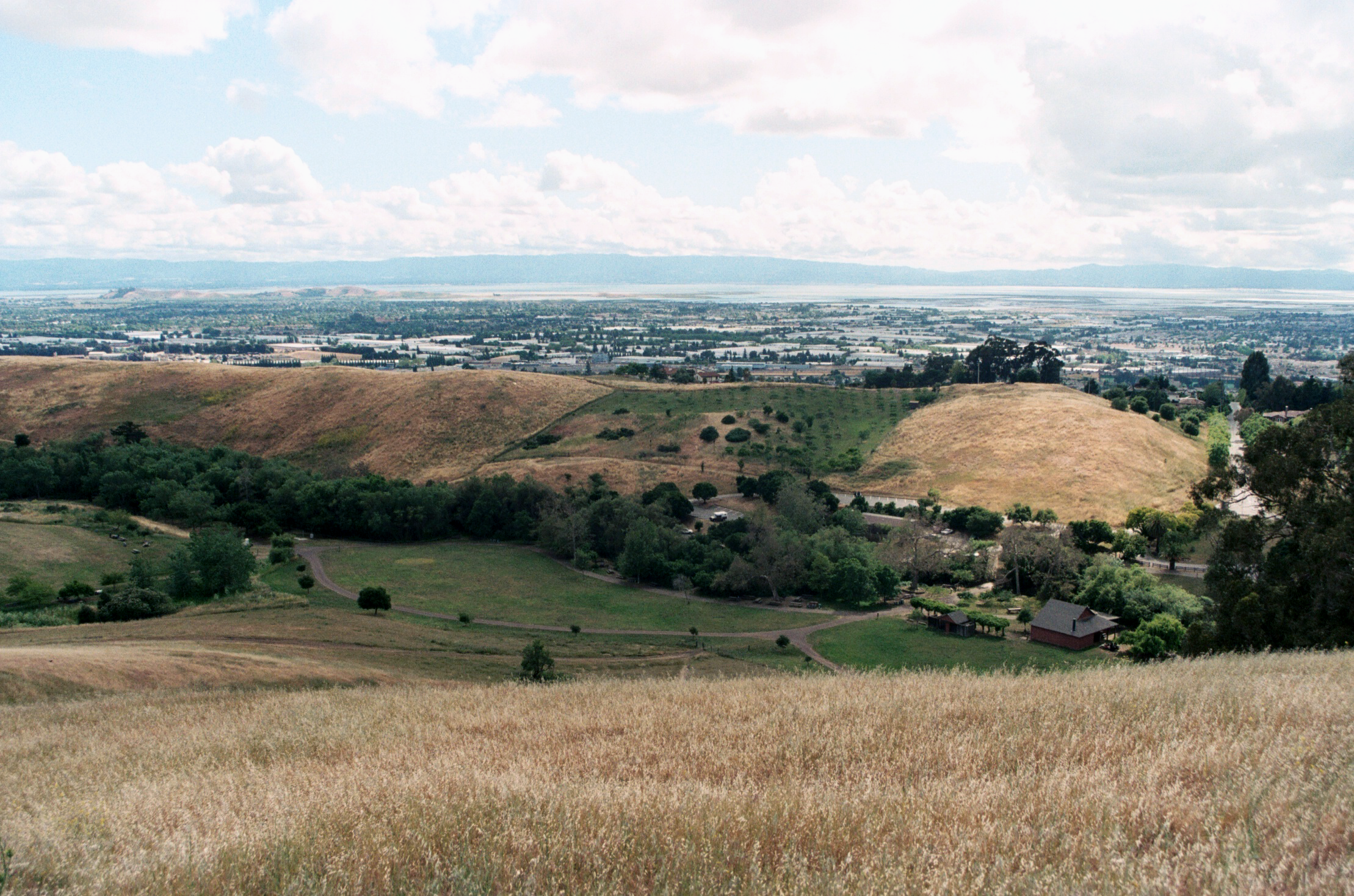
Facing west within the park, overlooking the city of Hayward, with the San Francisco Peninsula in the distance.

Garin Regional Park is a regional park located in Hayward, California, that is part of the East Bay Regional Parks system. It shares a contiguous border with sister park Dry Creek Pioneer Regional Park. The park is the site of the former Garin Ranch, sold by Andrew J. Garin to the district in 1966.

"Ukraina Honcharenko", the former homestead of Ukrainian political émigré Agapius Honcharenko and a California Historical Landmark, is located in the park.

The park is situated behind the California State University, East Bay campus, and extends south, sharing a border with Pleasanton Ridge Regional Park. Summits in the park reach as high as 1,500 feet. Among the maintained trails, Garin Regional Park features several fenced off abandoned trails, some of which lead deep into the forest.

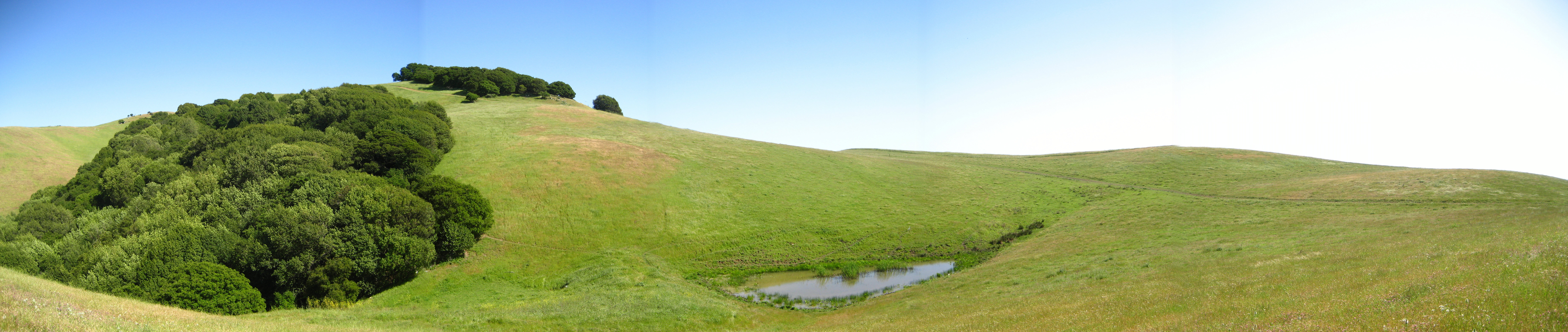
A panoramic view showing a watering hole near a ridge at Garin Regional Park.

The park is used by the Hayward Area Athletic League as a high-school cross-country course. It is considered the home course of Moreau Catholic High School. Due to the hilly nature of the course race times are generally slower on this course than comparable distances elsewhere. The 2 and 3 mile trails that are used climb the hills at the front of the park. The entire San Francisco Bay can be viewed from the hills.

The park contains a small historic apple orchard with heirloom varieties. The park hosts the Garin Apple Festival in late Summer, with apples available for tasting.

== Ukraina ==
Ukraina was the former home, and final resting place of Agapius Honcharenko and his wife, Albina. The site, located within Garin Regional Park and dedicated on May 15, 1999, is listed on the California Historical Landmarks list. Honcharenko lived on the property, totaling 40 acres, for 43 years during the 19th and 20th century. In 1890, Charles Howard Shinn interviewed Father Agapius for the Christian Union. The father visited the Shinn Ranch and spoke to Shinn's father, James. In 1902, the property emerged as a commune when a group of Ukrainian Canadians moved to the area. The commune eventually dissolved due to management disagreements. Honcharenko went on to live on, work on, and own the property until his death in 1916. The property was then owned, until 1991, by the Meillke family. In 1991, the East Bay Regional Park District acquired the property.

It took approximately 30 years for the property to be dedicated a historical landmark. This was primarily due to disagreements between the Russian-American and Ukrainian-American communities as to whom Honcharenko "belonged" to. Eventually it was settled in the Ukrainian favor and the place was named "Ukraina," by the Ukrainian American Honcharenko Committee. Today, the property consists of the gravesite of the Honcharenko's, the foundation of a chicken coop, and a grotto used by Honcharenko for religious purposes. The grotto consists of a wind cave, six feet by three feet, that was cut out of a sandstone cliff. Wall paintings exist in the grotto. Honcharenko's house stood on site until the 1950s, when it was demolished by the Meillke family due to vandalism. Olive trees still stand on the property. They were originally planted by Honcharenko. At the dedication ceremony in 1999, approximately 400 people of Ukrainian descent living in the United States attended.
