= Hayward Gay Prom =

LGBT youth event in Hayward, California

- Date: 1995; 31 years ago
- Duration: Annual
- Location: Hayward, California, United States
- Theme: LGBT youth dance
- Organized by: Ken Athey

The Hayward Gay Prom is an annual "anti-prom" for LGBTQ youth founded in 1995 in Hayward, California, United States.

== History ==
One of the oldest running gay proms in the United States, it was founded in 1995 by Ken Athey and Project Eden/Lambda Youth, a local LGBT youth mental health organization. It was initially held at Centennial Hall and currently at Chabot College.

Students from 14 to 20 years old may attend the event. Local LGBTQ organizations provide support and conduct outreach, and parents are encouraged to attend and support their children. In 2014, the director for Project Eden predicted more than 300 youth would attend, stating:

[Gay prom] is needed because the young people need a place to go to where they feel safe and accepted.

A documentary film on the prom, Now We Can Dance: The Story of the Hayward Gay Prom, was created and shown at the 2013 San Francisco International LGBT Film Festival.

== Controversy ==
Since its inception the event has attracted violent protest and bomb threats, requiring police and community protection. Attendees have been subject to harassment by teachers and other students due to their participation. After moving to Chabot College the number of protesters eventually declining to zero in 2014.
