= Dry Creek Pioneer Regional Park =

Park in California, United States

Coordinates: 37.61°N 122°W

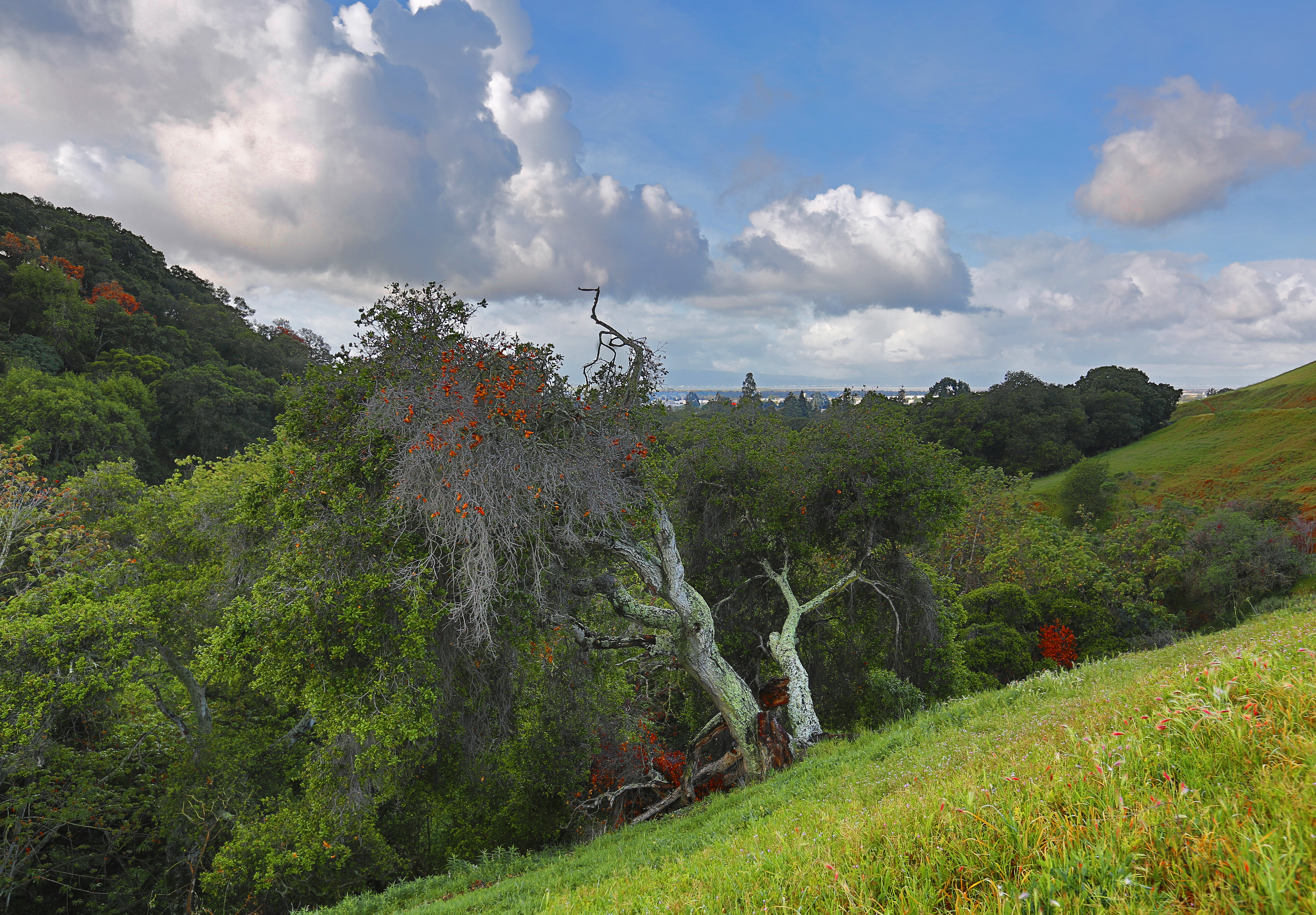
- Interactive map of Dry Creek Pioneer Regional Park
- Location: Alameda County, California
- Nearest city: Union City, California
- Operator: East Bay Regional Park System

Dry Creek Pioneer Regional Park is a regional park located in Union City, California, sharing a contiguous border with sister park Garin Regional Park. It is part of the East Bay Regional Parks system.

== Activities ==
More than 20 miles of trails within Garin and Dry Creek Pioneer Regional Parks give visitors the opportunity to explore the 5,857 acres that comprise these parklands. While the trails are not paved, they are great for hiking, horseback riding, and many are suitable for bicycles. Motorcycles and all other types of motor vehicles are not allowed on the trails.

Independent nature study is encouraged here. Guided interpretive programs for this area are coordinated through the Coyote Hills Regional Park Visitor Center in Fremont. Dog walking is permitted in the park, but leashes must be no longer than 6-feet.
