= Anti-prom =

Protest or alternative celebration to a school prom

(Anti-Prom)
- Location: Schools, community centers, private venues
- Theme: Casual, alternative, or student-organized dance
- Participants: High school students

Anti-prom, also known as MORP—a reversal of the word "PROM"—is a social event often organized by high school students as a casual alternative or a direct protest/boycott against traditional prom culture. Unlike the formal, often expensive, and highly structured nature of prom, MORP embraces affordability, inclusivity, and personal expression, offering students a laid-back and enjoyable experience without the rigid expectations of a traditional school dance.

== Origins and purpose ==
Anti-prom was created as a response to the growing exclusivity and financial burden of prom and junior prom. While proms are often seen as a rite of passage, not all students feel comfortable or able to participate due to social, financial, or personal reasons. The event provides an alternative celebration where students can enjoy music, dancing, and socializing in a more relaxed and less pressured environment.

The attendees of an anti-prom usually disagree with the values of the high school in-crowd who, stereotypically, organize the prom from the preparatory stages to the after-parties. In particular, anti-prom attendees protest what they regard as the vanity, excess, and conformity that the prom culture expects from students. Anti-proms do not follow any prescribed format, catering instead to the varied tastes of the large spectrum of students who feel dissociated from prom culture. Nevertheless, anti-prom participants are generally concerned with arranging social activities that are not only fun and enjoyable, but which also serve as an assertion of solidarity and of the legitimacy of social difference.

=== Key differences between MORP and prom/junior prom ===
While the Junior Prom is often considered a "MORP" it is not meant to. MORP is not a replacement for Junior Prom but rather an event that gives students an extra opportunity to socialize, dance, and have fun without the pressure or expense of a formal prom. Unlike prom, which follows a traditional format, MORP varies widely depending on the school or student organizers. Some schools officially recognize MORP and hold it as a school-sponsored event, while others see it as a student-organized alternative, sometimes held off-campus.

Junior Prom, 1940

Feature	MORP/Anti-prom	Prom/Junior Prom
Formality	Casual, fun, laid-back	Formal, elegant
Dress Code	T-shirts, neon, themes	Suits, dresses, formal wear
Theme	Often wacky or creative	Classic elegance, ballroom-style
Attendees	Open to all students	Usually limited to juniors/seniors
Setting	School gym, cafeteria, outdoors	Banquet hall or fancy venue
Cost	Low-cost tickets, DIY décor	Expensive tickets, venue rentals

== Religious and cultural variations ==
In the United States, youth belonging to the Church of Jesus Christ of Latter-day Saints often attend morps organized through their church or stake. This is true even in the state of Utah, where a substantial percentage of the youth belong to Mormon families. The custom is that the girls may each ask a boy to take them, but the boys may not ask the girls.

== Queer proms ==
Sexual orientation and gender identity sometimes play a role in leading students to form and attend an anti-prom (sometimes referred to as a gay prom or queer prom): lesbian, gay, bisexual, transgender, queer, and questioning (LGBTQ+) students who feel that attending their school's traditional prom with a same-sex partner or not identifying in traditional gender identity fashion would be problematic might choose to hold their own gathering. Gay proms began to form in the 1990s, with one of the longest running and oldest being the Hayward Gay Prom, which was first held in 1995.

== In television ==
- Malcolm in the Middle season 7 (Episode 21)
- Radio Rebel
