= List of buildings and structures in Hayward, California =

This is a list of buildings and structures in Hayward, California. The list includes structures once located in Hayward, California no longer standing there, and buildings historically associated with the city that are not currently within city limits. Structures in the National Register of Historic Places are indicated with NRHP. Structures (and sites of former structures) that are California Historical Landmarks, are indicated with CHL.

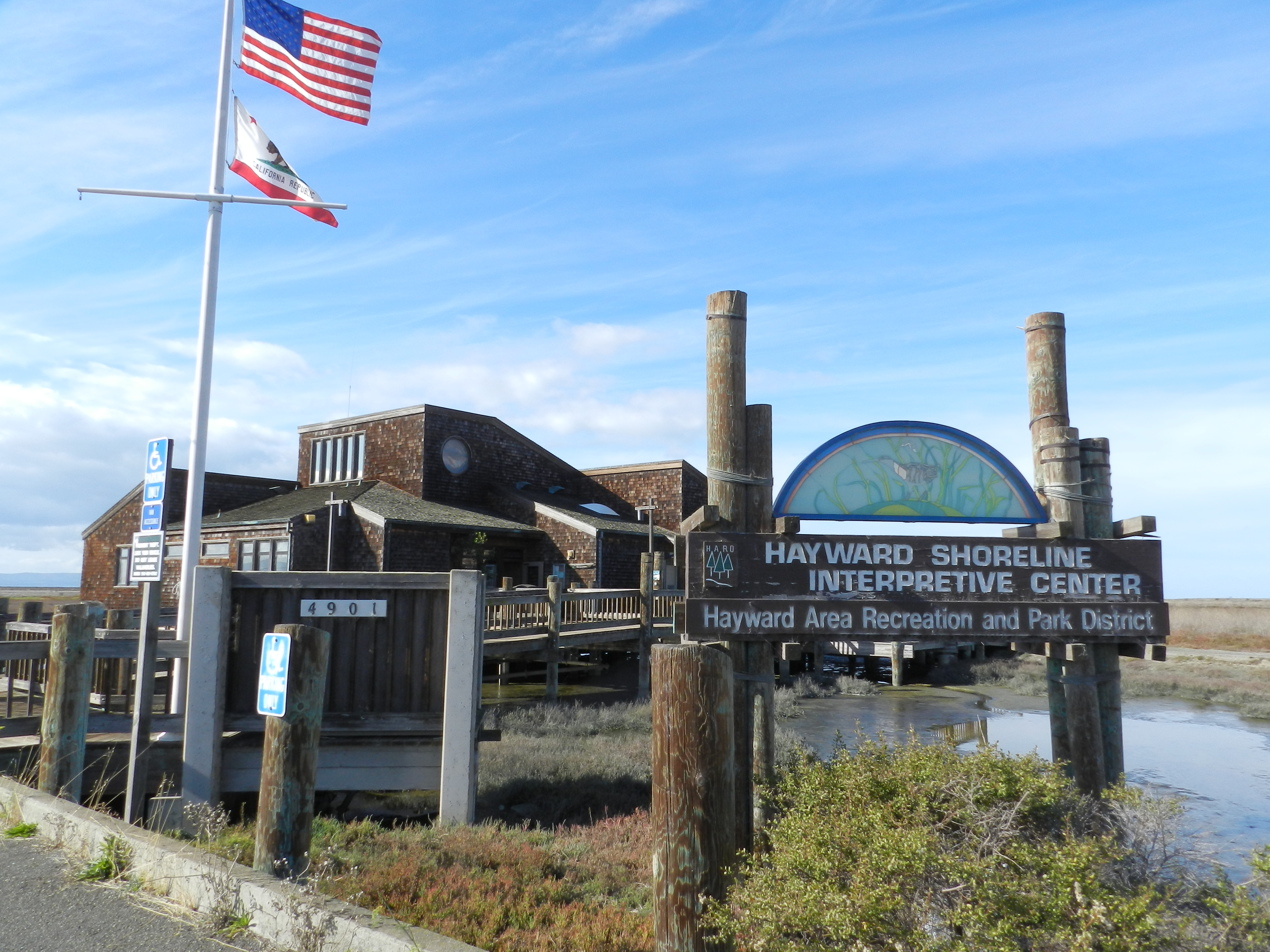
Hayward Shoreline Interpretive Center building

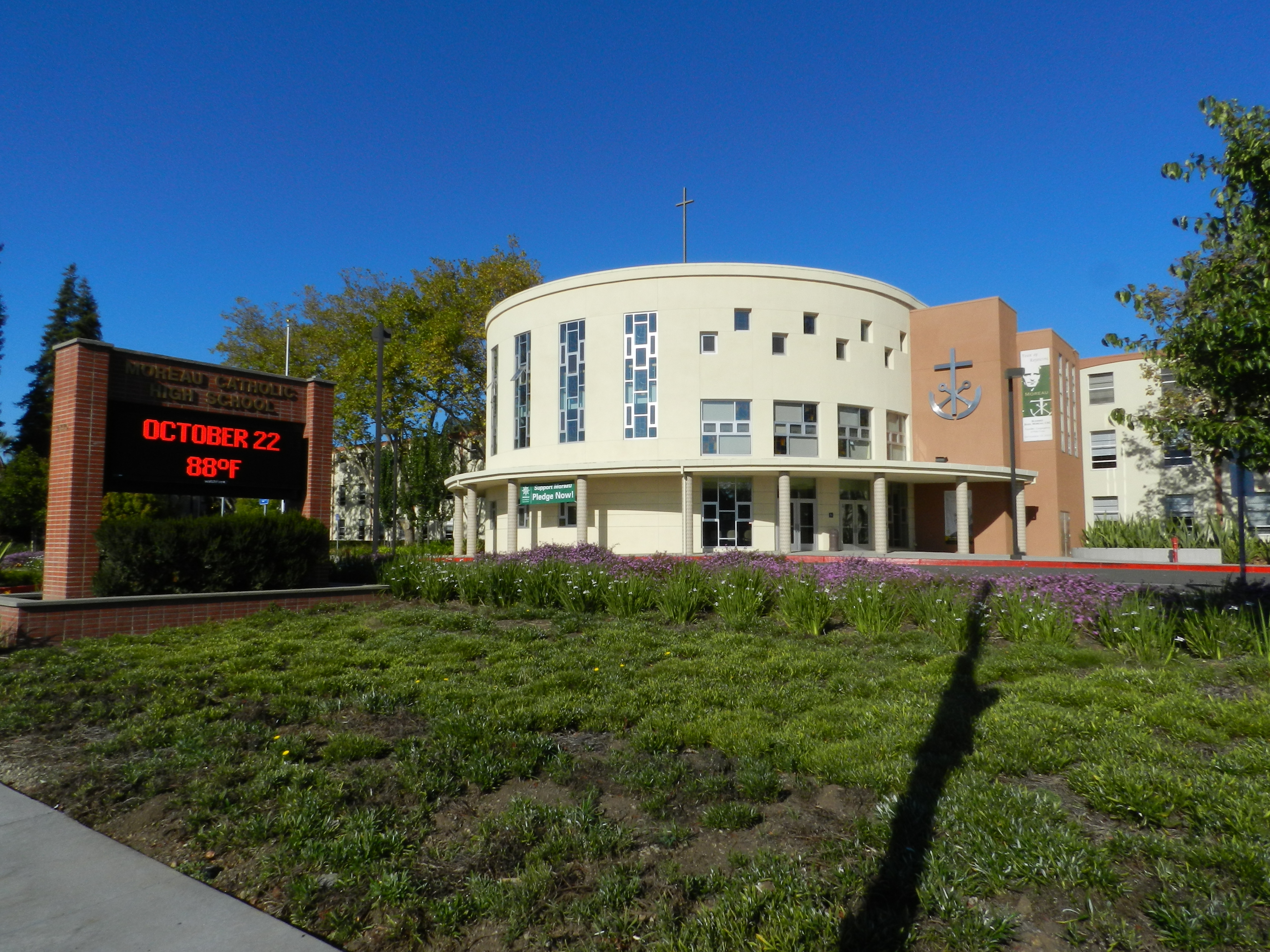
Moreau High School

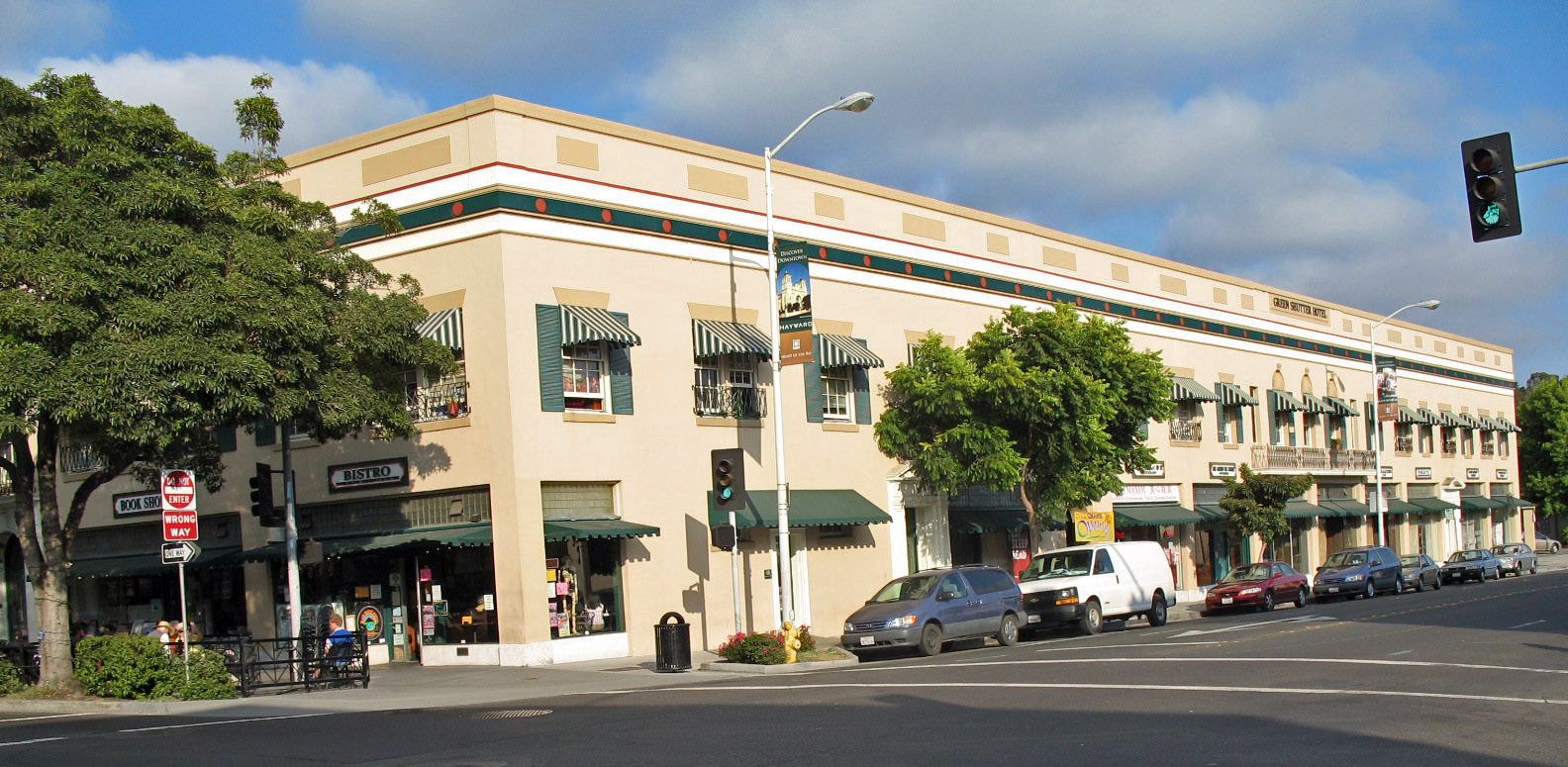
Green Shutter Hotel

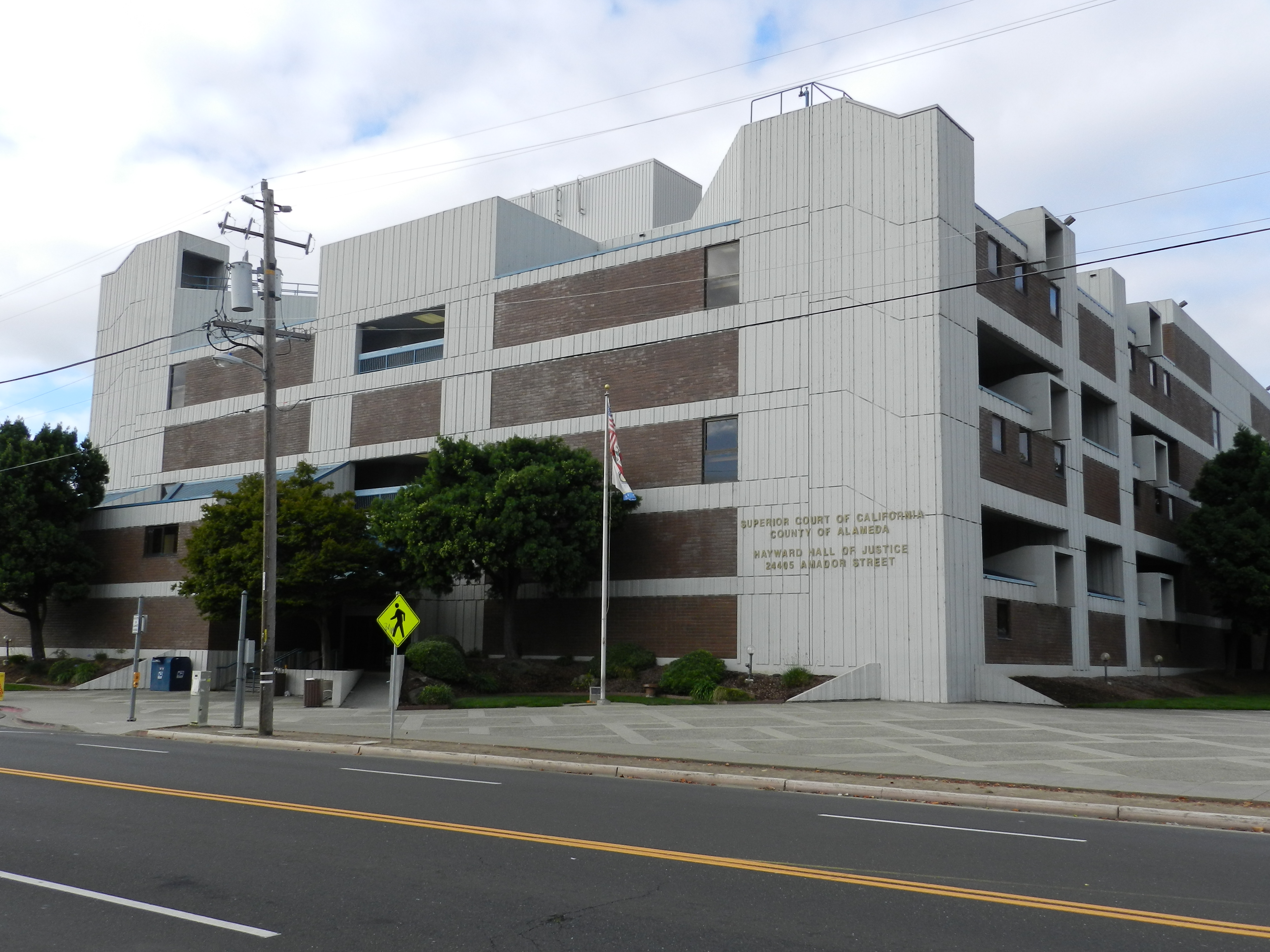
Hayward Hall of Justice

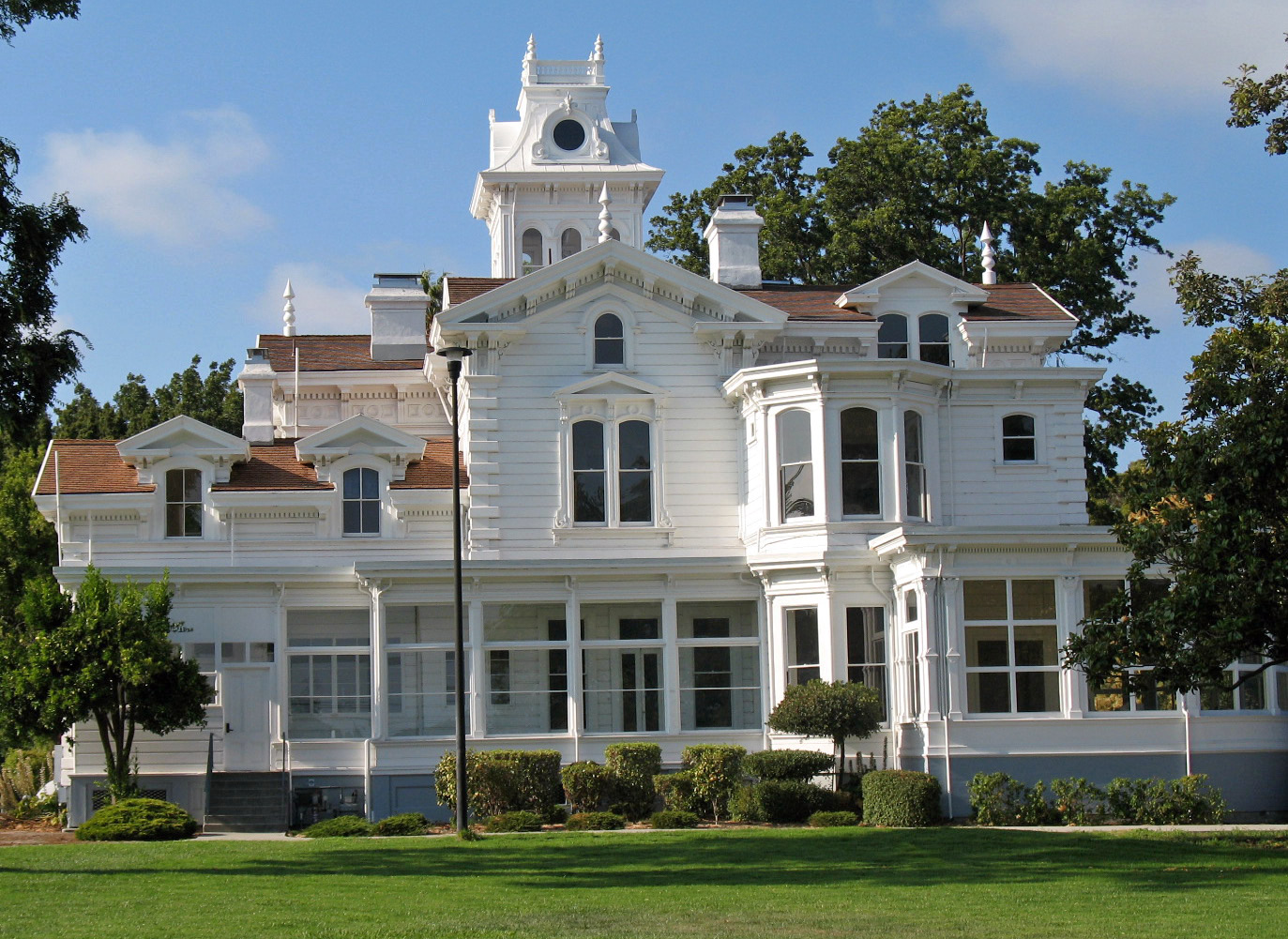
Meek Mansion

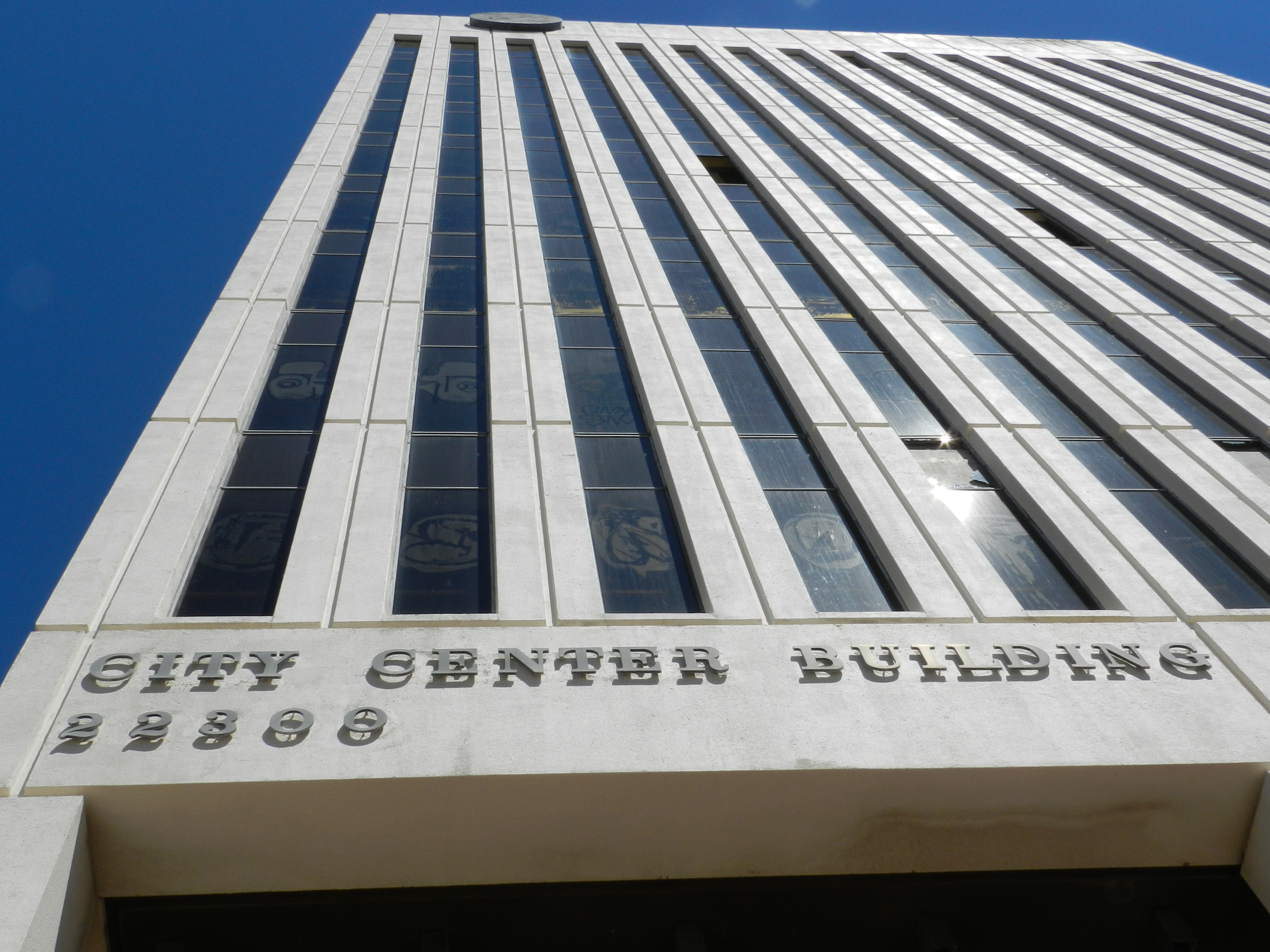
City Center Building

- Hayward's first city hall, located in Alex Giuliani Plaza
- Centennial Hall Convention Center, now demolished
- Eden Congregational Church (NRHP)
- Green Shutter Hotel (NRHP)
- The Hayward Ace Hardware, owned by news reporter Jim Wieder, an historic building built in 1900 as the Hayward Emporium mercantile store, where upstairs, boxers Max Baer and George Foreman later trained.
- Hayward Amtrak station
- Hayward BART station
- Hayward City Hall
- Hayward Executive Airport
- Hayward Hall of Justice
- Hayward High School
- Hayward Shoreline Interpretive Center
- Harry Rowell Rodeo Ranch, now within the bounds of Castro Valley, drew rodeo cowboys from across the continent, and western movie actors such as Slim Pickens and others from Hollywood.
- Hunt's cannery, operated through most of the 20th century, closed and demolished in late 20th century
- Kaiser Permanente Medical Center, building no longer extant as of 2014
- Meek Mansion (NRHP), in unincorporated Alameda County, historically associated with Hayward
- Mervyns Building, former headquarters of the Mervyn's department store chain (demolished in 21st century)
- Moreau Catholic High School
- Mount Eden High School
- Pioneer Amphitheatre
- Pioneer Gym
- Pioneer Stadium
- Russell City Energy Center
- San Mateo–Hayward Bridge, with the eastern terminus in Hayward
- Skywest Commons, shopping center
- South Hayward BART station
- Southland Mall
- St. Rose Hospital
- Sunset High School
- Tennyson High School
- Ukraina Ranch, the former property of Agapius Honcharenko (no longer extant) CHL#1025, marker located in Garin Regional Park
- City Center Building, the second former city hall, briefly the tallest building in Hayward (abandoned in 1989, then demolished in 2020)
- Warren Hall, on the California State University, East Bay campus, demolished in 2013

== See also ==
- National Register of Historic Places listings in Alameda County, California
