= MSJ =

MSJ may refer to:

- Microsoft Systems Journal, a former technical journal by Microsoft Corporation, merged into MSDN Magazine
- Mission San Jose High School, a high school in Fremont, California, United States
- Motion for Summary judgment, a legal term requesting a judgment without a full trial
- Mount Saint Joseph (disambiguation), several places and schools
- Misawa Airport (IATA airport code MSJ), Misawa, Aomori, Japan
- Ma language (ISO 639 language code msj)
- Master of Science in Journalism

== See also ==
- The International MS Journal
- Microsoft Japan
