= Mount Saint Joseph =

Mount Saint Joseph may refer to:

== Communities ==
- Mount Saint Joseph, Ohio, United States, an unincorporated community in central Delhi Township, Hamilton County

== Educational institutions ==
=== Australia ===
- Mount Saint Joseph, Milperra, an independent Catholic girls school in Milperra, New South Wales
- Mount St. Joseph Girls' College, a Catholic girls school in Altona, Victoria

=== United Kingdom ===
- Mount St Joseph School, a secondary school in Farnworth, Greater Manchester, England

=== United States ===
- Chestnut Hill College, Philadelphia, Pennsylvania, founded as Mount Saint Joseph College and renamed in 1938
- Mount St. Joseph University, Cincinnati, Ohio, a private Catholic co-educational university
- Mount Saint Joseph High School, Baltimore, Maryland, a private Catholic high school

== Hospitals ==
- Mount Saint Joseph Hospital, a public hospital in Vancouver, British Columbia, Canada

== Religious places ==
- Mount Saint Joseph (West Virginia), a historic house near Wheeling, West Virginia, United States, also known as Holloway Estate
- Mount St. Joseph Abbey, Roscrea, an abbey near Roscrea, North Tipperary, Ireland
- Mount Saint Joseph Cemetery (Hayward, California), a cemetery in downtown Hayward also known as All Saints Cemetery or Portuguese Cemetery
- Mount St. Joseph (Peterborough, Ontario), Canada, a former Sisters of St. Joseph convent

== See also ==
- Saint Joseph (disambiguation)
- Mount Saint Joseph Academy (disambiguation)
