= Samora Goodson =

American football player (born 1984)

No. 9
- Position: Wide receiver

Personal information
- Born: October 7, 1984 (age 42); San Jose, California, U.S.
- Listed height: 6 ft 3 in (1.91 m)
- Listed weight: 210 lb (95 kg)

Career information
- High school: Hayward (CA)
- College: Southeast Missouri State

Career history
- 2008: San Jose SaberCats
- 2010: San Jose Wolves
- 2011–2013: San Jose SaberCats
- 2013: New Orleans VooDoo
- 2014: Portland Thunder
- 2014: Los Angeles KISS

Samora Moses Goodson (born October 7, 1984) is an American former professional football wide receiver.

== Early life and college ==
Goodson was born in San Jose, California, grew up in Hayward, California, and graduated from Hayward High School in 2002. At Hayward High, Goodson played basketball and only one year of football. Goodson then went to Citrus College, a community college in the Los Angeles suburb Glendora. Goodson showed medium interest in the Division I-A schools Nevada, Oregon State, San Diego State, and Washington, but none offered him a scholarship.

In 2005, Goodson transferred to the Division I-AA Southeast Missouri State University. In two seasons with the Southeast Missouri State Redhawks, Goodson played in 22 games and had 37 receptions for 439 yards and 4 touchdowns. Goodson graduated in 2007 with a degree in university studies.

== Professional career ==
In 2008, Goodson signed with the San Jose SaberCats of the Arena Football League. He spent the regular season in the practice squad and was promoted to the active roster for the postseason, but he did not play in any games. Goodson spent the 2009 season trying out for UFL and CFL teams. In 2010, Goodson played in four games for the San Jose Wolves of the American Indoor Football Association. He rejoined the SaberCats in 2011.

Goodson made 46 receptions for 630 yards and 12 touchdowns in 2011 for San Jose. In 2012 with San Jose, he made 114 receptions for 1,471 yards and 27 touchdowns. In 2013 with San Jose, Goodson made 11 receptions for 134 yards and 1 touchdown. On May 1, 2013, the SaberCats traded Goodson to the New Orleans VooDoo. Goodson did not play any games with New Orleans.

On March 6, 2014, Goodson signed with the Portland Thunder of the AFL. With Portland, Goodson made 3 receptions for 25 yards. The Thunder placed Goodson on injured reserve on March 25 and re-assigned Goodson on May 9. Goodson later signed with the expansion Los Angeles Kiss on May 22. Goodson made 34 receptions for 458 yards and 6 touchdowns with the Kiss. However, he returned to injured reserve on July 17.
