= Eden Congregational Church =

Historic church in California, United States

- U.S. National Register of Historic Places
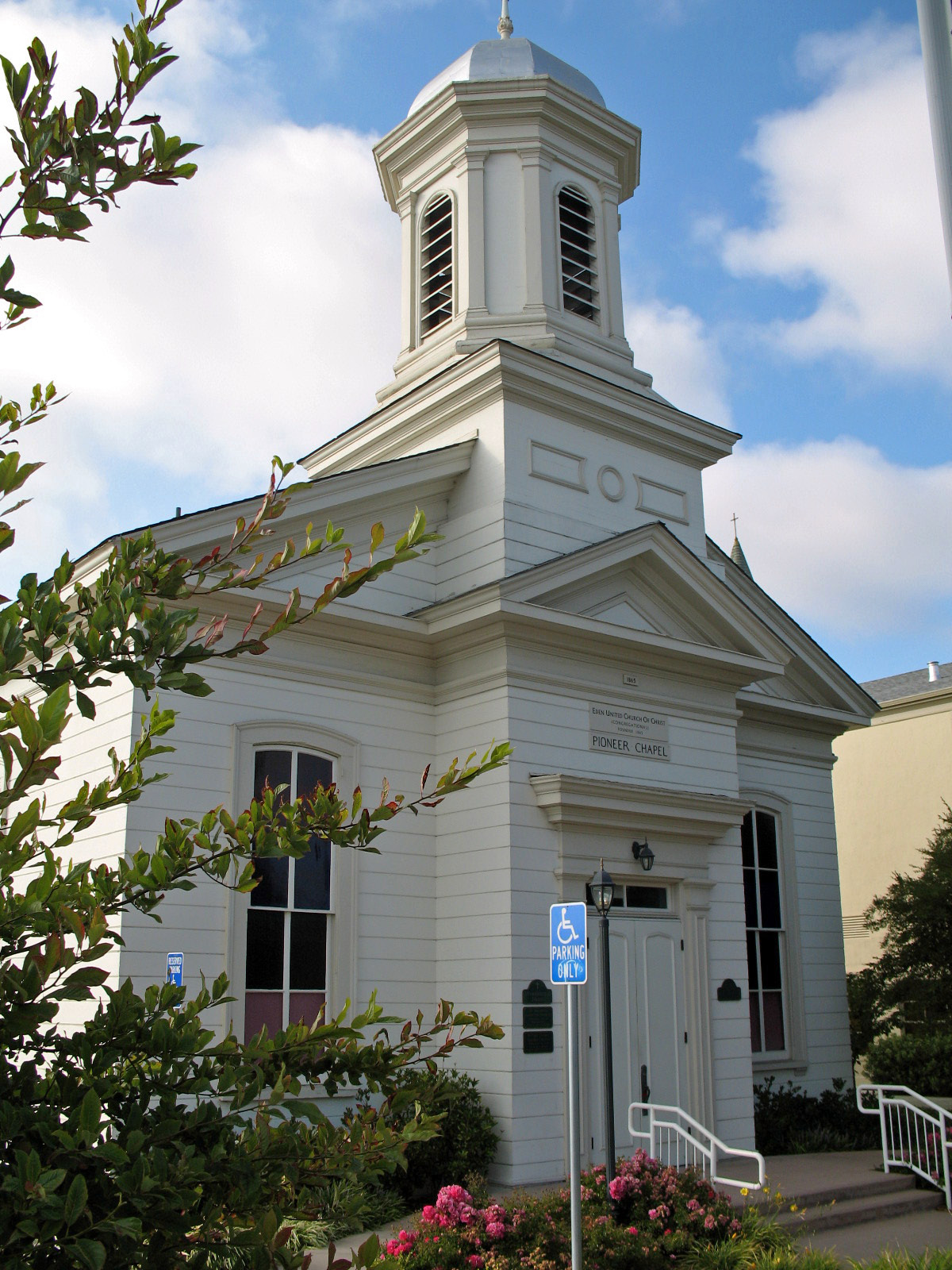
- Eden Congregational Church

- Location within Oakland, California Location within California Location within the United States
- Location: Hayward, California
- Coordinates: 37°40′51.49″N 122°5′37″W
- NRHP reference No.: 07000788
- Added to NRHP: August 3, 2007

Eden Congregational Church, also known as Pioneer Chapel, is a historic church building located just north of downtown Hayward in Alameda County, California. The building was listed on the National Register of Historic Places in 2007. The church is still in use by the Eden United Church of Christ (Congregational). A culverted stretch of San Lorenzo Creek runs past it.

== History ==
The building was constructed in 1867. In 1947 the building was moved about one mile north. In 2003 the building was moved again, about 400 feet. The Hayward Area Historical Society was inaugurated in 1956 at the church.

== See also ==
- National Register of Historic Places listings in Alameda County, California
