= City Center Building =

Former city hall in Hayward, California

- Hayward City Center Building
- Interactive map of the City Center Building area
- Former names: Centennial Tower

General information
- Status: Demolished
- Type: City hall Business offices
- Location: 22300 Foothill Boulevard
- Coordinates: 37.679405°N 122.082353°W
- Construction started: 1966
- Completed: 1969
- Opened: October 18, 1969
- Closed: 1998
- Demolished: 2020
- Owner: Mika Realty of Los Angeles

Technical details
- Floor count: 11

Design and construction
- Architect: Mitchell Van Bourg

The City Center Building, known locally as Centennial Hall, was the tallest building in Hayward, California. It was previously the second tallest, until the 2013 razing of Warren Hall on the Cal State East Bay campus. It was for many years an abandoned building, located between Foothill Boulevard and City Center Drive, in the City Center section of Downtown Hayward, adjacent to the PlazaCenter mall. It was formerly used as Hayward City Hall.

Demolition of the building began in January 2020 and was completed by September 2020.

== History ==
The City of Hayward opened the steel reinforced concrete building on October 18, 1969. It was originally planned to have 20 floors and a cinema, but only 11 floors were built, with no cinema. The building served as Hayward's city hall from 1969 to 1998. Its top floor was the seat of municipal government and other floors were leased to businesses. It was designed to replace the old Hayward city hall, now located at Alex Giulini Plaza. It was the first building in the planned City Center complex. Architectural critic Allan Temko nicknamed the building "the toaster" in the 1970s, strongly influencing public opinion against it. The Centennial Hall Convention Center was added to the complex.

In the 1980s, the PlazaCenter complex of retail and commercial businesses was built next to it, on the former grounds of Hayward High School.

The 1989 Loma Prieta earthquake damaged the building's structural integrity and the city government moved out of the building. In 1998, after the completion of the new city hall, the building was closed to the public. The city sold the building for $1.5 million in 1998 to a developer who planned to convert it to condominiums. They renamed it "Centennial Tower" and sold it to another developer. Condominium conversion was never implemented, as it was considered too expensive. In 2006 plans were made to demolish the building. A year later, the demolition was canceled. On November 1, 2009, the adjacent Centennial Hall Convention Center closed, and was subsequently demolished.

== New Hayward City Hall ==
The new City Hall opened in January 1998. It is located at B Street and Watkins Street, next to the Hayward BART station.

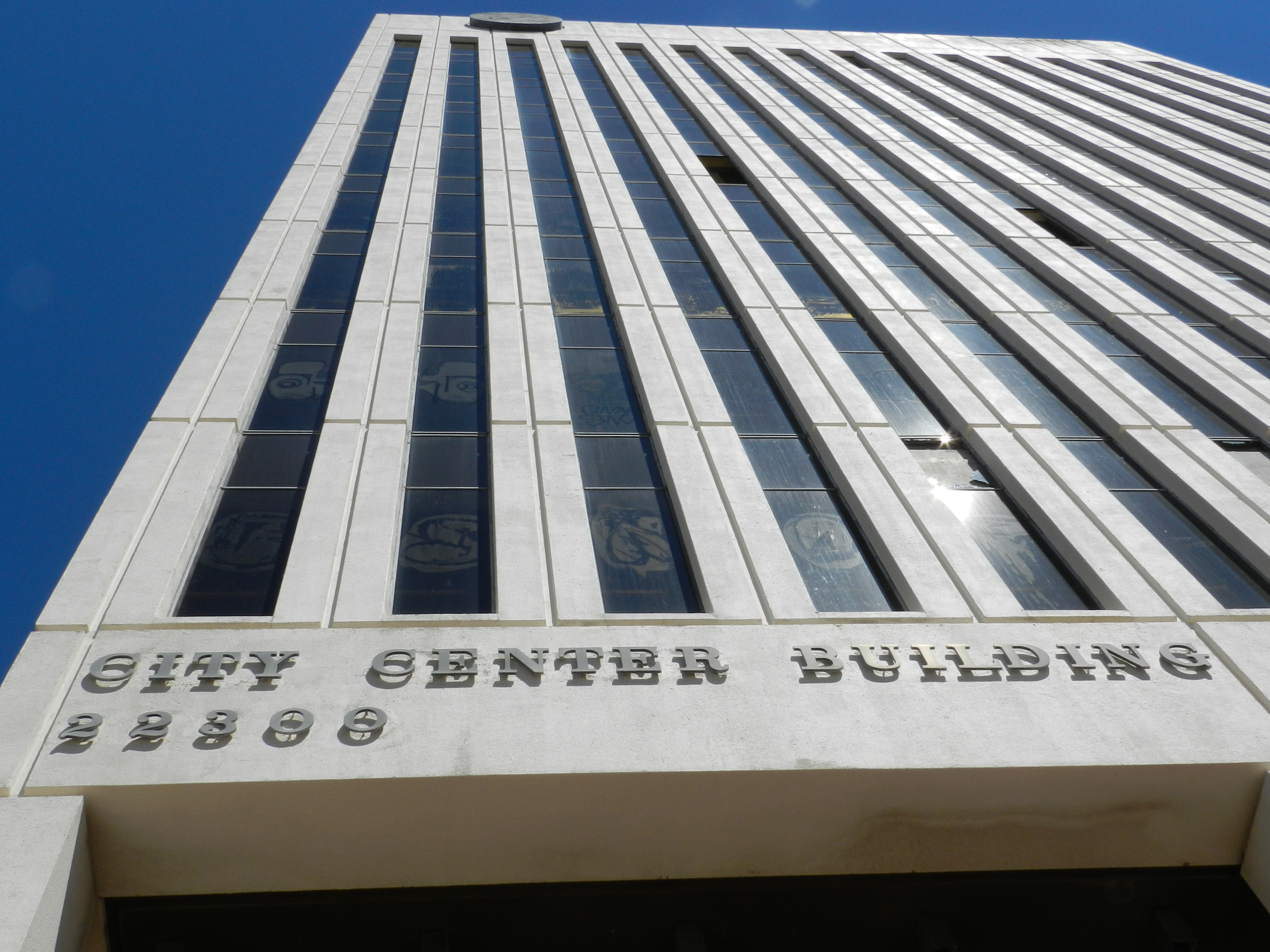
City Center Building, showing window damage and graffiti

== Later Conditions ==
The building remained vacant. The interior walls, pipes and heating system have been removed. There were numerous broken or boarded-up windows. Graffiti is visible on the windows and top floors. In January 2008 a fence was erected around the building to deter vandalism. In March 2010 a fire broke out on the top floors of the tower. Homeless people have occupied the first floor, and taken out copper pipes to sell as scrap, as well as setting up makeshift shelters on the upper floors.

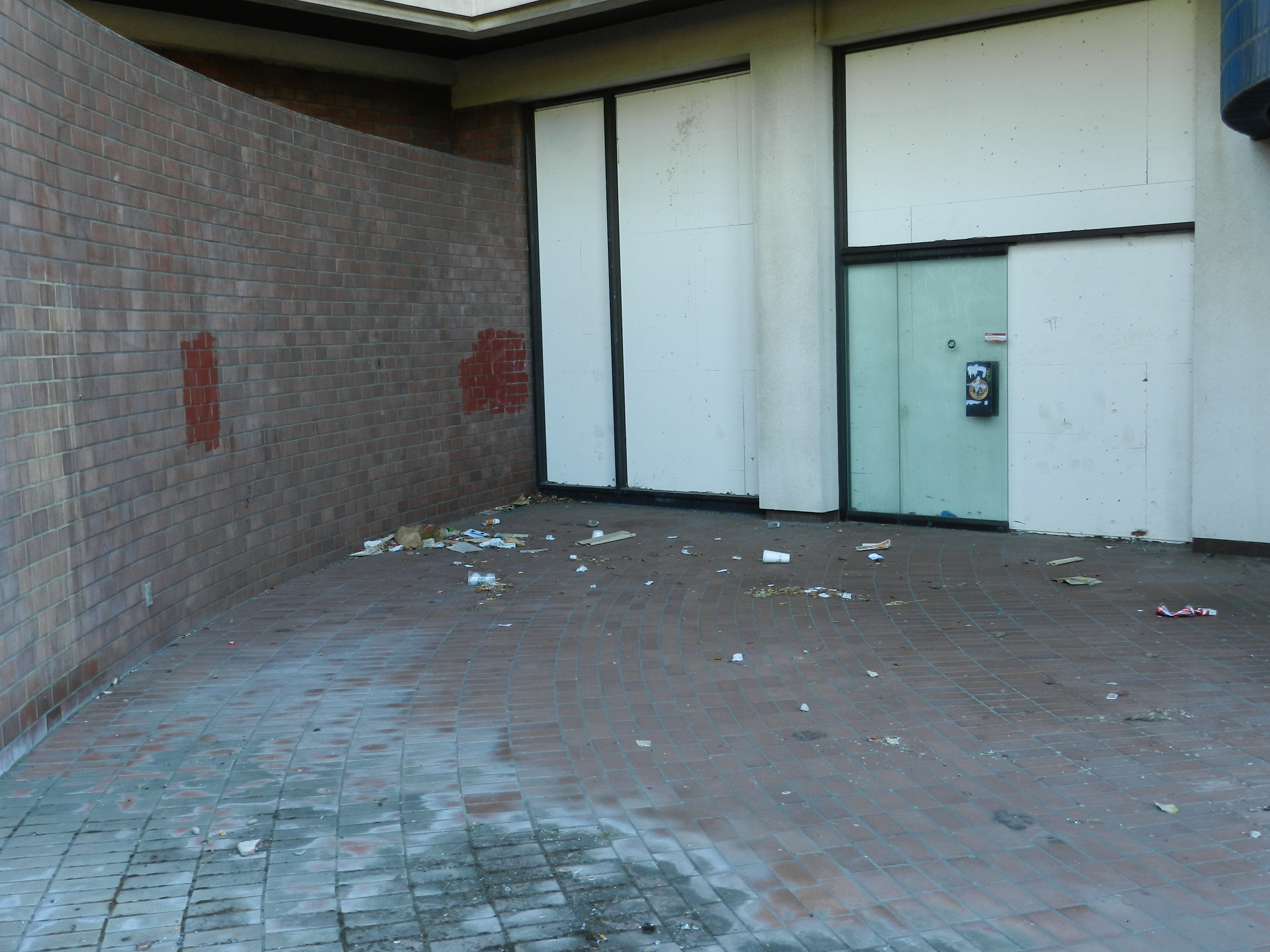
evidence of disuse at ground level

=== Plans for the site ===
Plans were announced in early 2008 for remodeling the tower, including seismic retrofitting and conversion to office space. There were also plans to build condominiums over the Centennial Hall parking garage, which has also been demolished. The building closed in 2009. In 2010, the city opened bidding for its demolition. Instead of demolition, the site only had hazardous materials removed.

In June 2019, the Hayward City Council approved purchasing the building $5.2 million. Before the end of that year, they approved a $3.9 million demolition contract with Oakland’s Silverado Contractors. No decision had been made about what would happen to the site after the demolition, and the lot remains empty as of January 2026.
