= Davion Berry =

American basketball player (born 1991)

Manama Club
- Position: Shooting guard
- League: Bahraini Premier League

Personal information
- Born: November 1, 1991 (age 35) Oakland, California, U.S.
- Listed height: 6 ft 4 in (1.93 m)
- Listed weight: 185 lb (84 kg)

Career information
- High school: Hayward (Hayward, California)
- College: Cal State Monterey Bay (2009–2011); Weber State (2012–2014)
- NBA draft: 2014: undrafted
- Playing career: 2014–present

Career history
- 2014–2015: Torino
- 2015: Maine Red Claws
- 2015: Changwon LG Sakers
- 2015–2016: Maine Red Claws
- 2016: Raptors 905
- 2016: Kolossos Rodou
- 2016–2017: Tigers Tübingen
- 2017–2018: Raptors 905
- 2018–2019: Panionios
- 2019–2020: Enisey
- 2020: ASVEL
- 2020: Ironi Nes Ziona
- 2020–2021: Larisa
- 2021: APOEL
- 2021: BC Kalev
- 2022–present: Manama

Career highlights
- All-Greek League Team (2019); Greek League PIR Leader (2019); Big Sky Player of the Year (2014); 2× First-team All-Big Sky (2013, 2014); Big Sky Newcomer of the Year (2013)
- Stats at Basketball Reference

Davion Christopher Lamont Berry (born November 1, 1991) is an American professional basketball player for Manama Club of the Bahraini Premier League. He played college basketball for the Weber State Wildcats where he was named Big Sky Conference Player of the Year in 2014.

== High school career ==
Berry attended Hayward High School where he led his team to a 21–9 record his senior season. He was the named the team MVP and an All-League First Team selection that season.

== College career ==
After graduating, Berry attended Cal State Monterey Bay for two years where he averaged 18.3 points and 4.1 rebounds per game and twice earned All-Conference First Team honors. Later he transferred to Weber State where, after sitting for the 2011–2012 season per NCAA rules, he played and started 68 games for the Wildcats, ranking 15th in WSU history in career scoring with 1,160 career points and also fifth in career 3-point field goal percentage and 10th in career 3-pointers. In his two years at Weber state, he twice earned Big Sky All-Conference First Team honors and First Team All-District honors and was named the 2013–14 Big Sky MVP and the 2012–13 Big Sky Newcomer of the Year.

== Professional career ==
After going undrafted in the 2014 NBA draft, Berry joined the Portland Trail Blazers for the 2014 NBA Summer League. On July 25, 2014, he signed with PMS Torino for the 2014–15 Serie A2 Gold season. However, in late January 2015, he was replaced on the roster by Ian Miller after appearing in 19 games. He officially parted ways with Torino on March 3, 2015, and the following day, he was acquired by the Maine Red Claws of the NBA Development League.

In July 2015, Berry joined the NBA D-League Select Team for the 2015 NBA Summer League. In October 2015, he signed with the Changwon LG Sakers of the Korean Basketball League. However, he managed just three games for Changwon, with his final game coming on November 8. He was released by the club and returned to the United States, where on November 17, he was reacquired by the Maine Red Claws. Three days later, he made his season debut for the Red Claws in a 112–93 win over Raptors 905, recording six points, four assists and one steal in 12 minutes. On March 4, 2016, he was traded to Raptors 905 in exchange for a 2016 third-round draft pick and the returning player rights to Abdul Gaddy. On March 11, he made his debut for Raptors 905 in a 102–98 win over the Iowa Energy, recording three rebounds and three assists in 21 minutes off the bench.

On August 1, 2016, Berry joined Kolossos Rodou. On October 8, he made his debut for Kolossos in a 74–66 loss to Rethymno Cretan Kings, recording 17 points, one rebound and one assist in 30 minutes. Nine days later, he was waived by Kolossos.

On August 4, 2018, he signed with Panionios of the Greek Basket League.

On July 30, 2019, he signed with BC Enisey of the VTB United League. He later joined ASVEL and averaged 8.5 points per game. Berry signed with Ironi Nes Ziona of the Israeli Premier League on August 14, 2020.

On August 12, 2021, he has signed with Kalev/Cramo of VTB United League. Berry averaged 12.2 points, 2.9 rebounds, and 2.1 assists per game. On January 1, 2022, he signed with Manama Club of the Bahraini Premier League.

=== The Basketball Tournament (TBT) (2017–present) ===
In the summer of 2017, Berry played in The Basketball Tournament on ESPN for The Wasatch Front (Weber State Alumni). He competed for the $2 million prize, and for The Wasatch Front, he scored 16 points in their first round loss to Team Challenge ALS 97–81.

== Personal life ==
Berry majored in Technical Sales at Weber State.
