= Alex Giuliani Plaza =

- Interactive map of the Alex Giuliani Plaza area

General information
- Status: abandoned
- Type: City Hall (1930-1969)
- Location: Mission Blvd; Hayward, CA 94541
- Coordinates: 37.6708°N 122.082°W
- Construction started: late 1920s
- Completed: 1930
- Opening: 1930
- Owner: City of Hayward

Technical details
- Floor count: 3

Alex Giuliani Plaza is a park surrounding a vacant building in downtown Hayward, California. The building was Hayward's first city hall. It is located on Mission Boulevard and D Street.

== History ==
Hayward City Hall opened in 1930. A circle-in-square design element on the building's facade was used to create the current city logo. It served as Hayward City Hall between 1930 and 1969. When the City Center Building opened in October 1969 the city government moved there. The current Hayward City Hall is located at 777 B Street, three blocks away from Giuliani Plaza.

A trace from the Hayward Fault runs directly under the old City Hall building. The building was abandoned due to structural damage caused by aseismic creep.

The Hayward 9/11 Memorial, located adjacent to the city hall building, a small memorial featuring 5 black granite columns, was dedicated May 30, 2016, to the first responders who died, and to the city's own fallen first responders, and the city's fallen soldiers

== Renaming ==
In 1999 the City of Hayward renamed the building and surrounding park Alex Giualini Plaza after the former mayor.

== Gallery ==
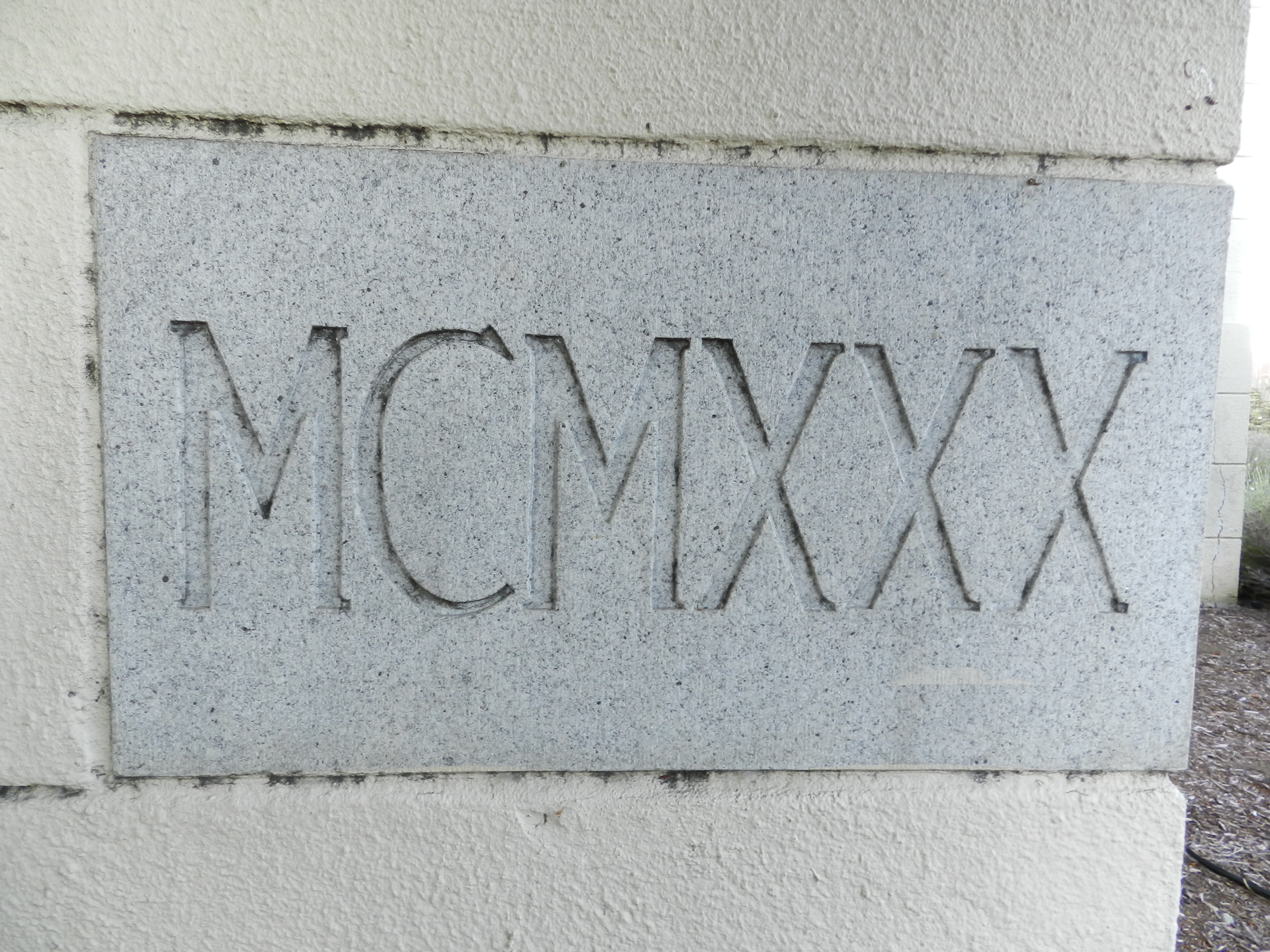
Stone showing construction date

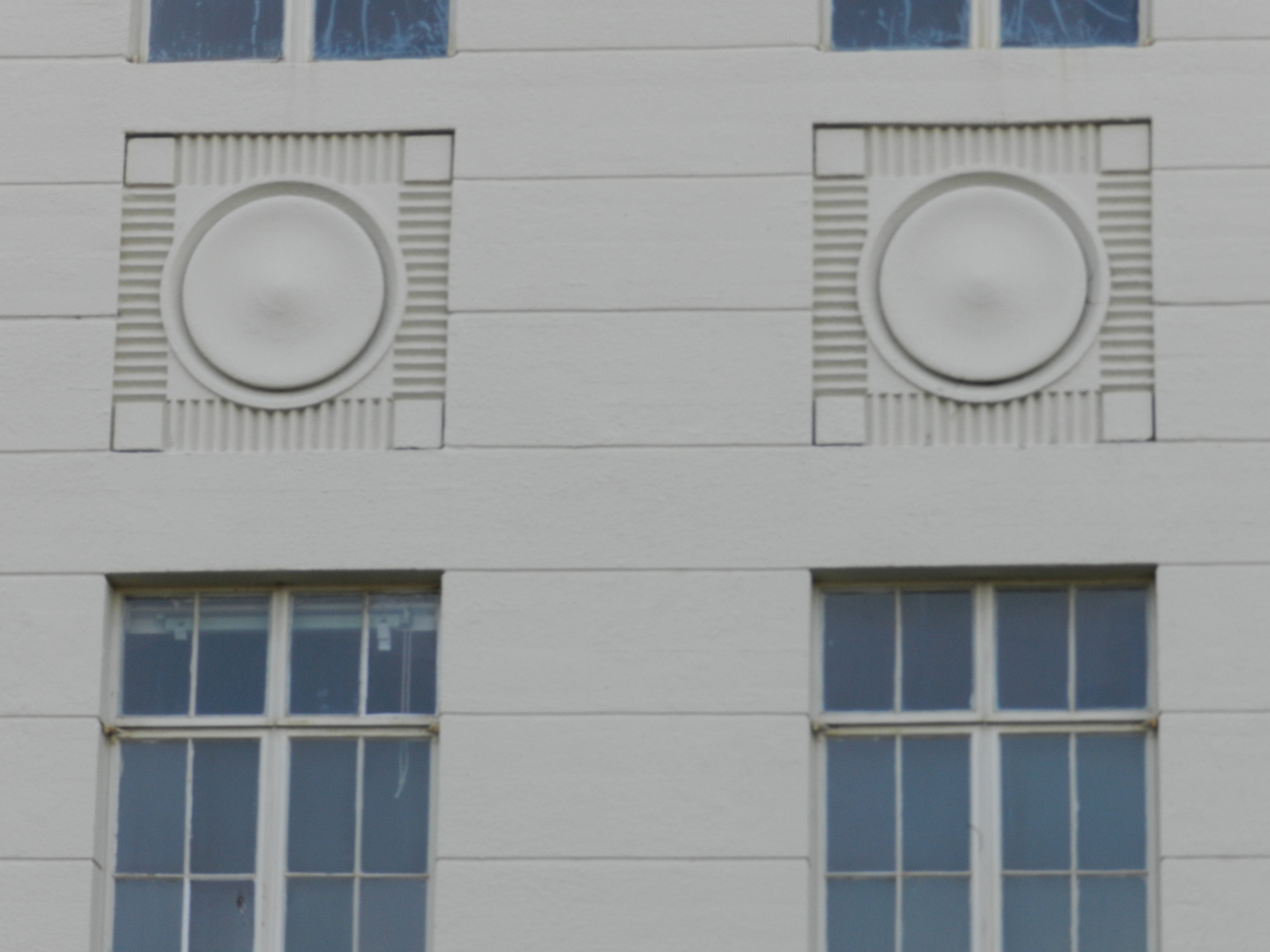
Motifs on the old City Hall building

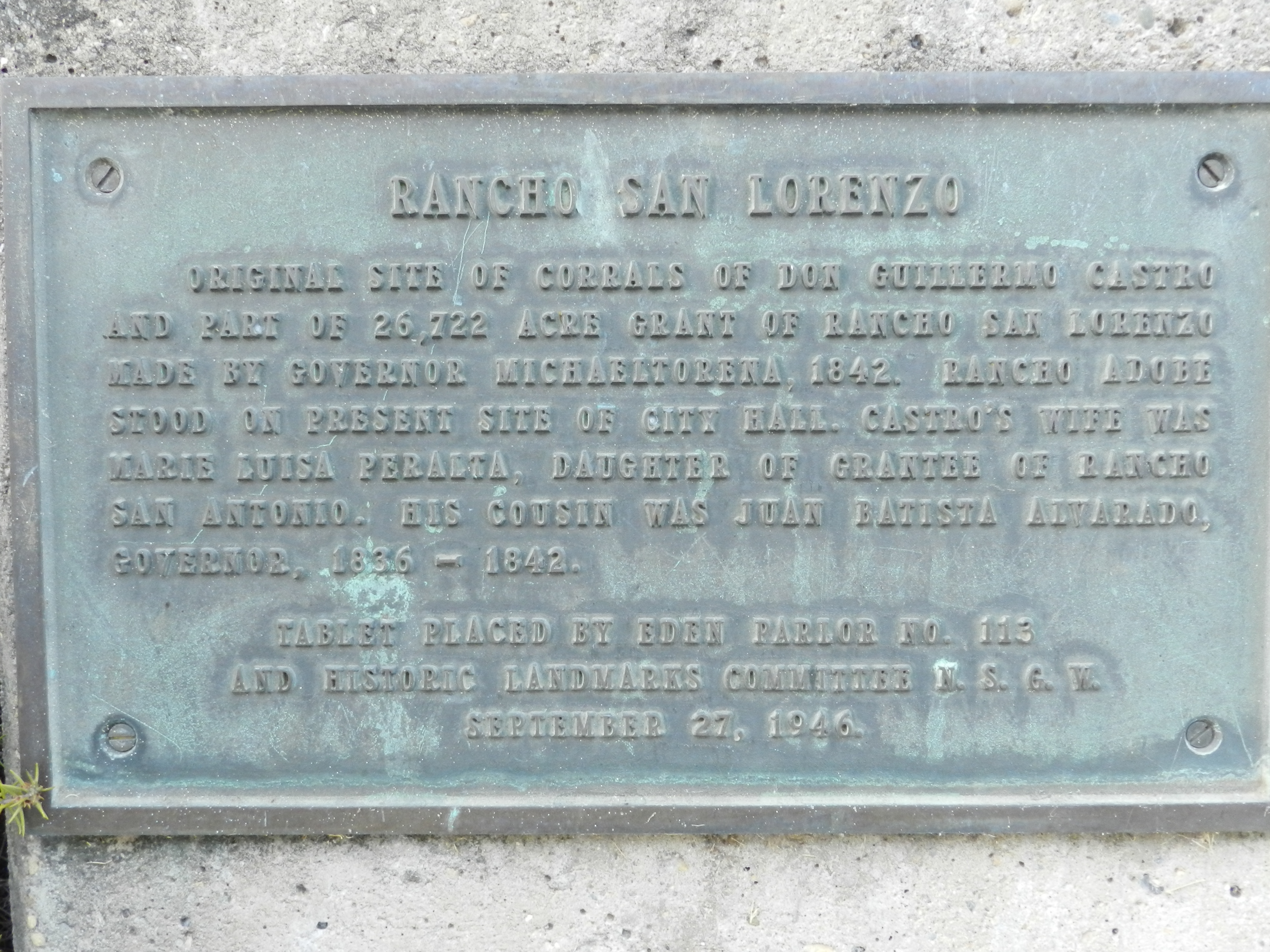
Commemorative plaque outside City Hall building, showing location of the former Rancho San Lorenzo

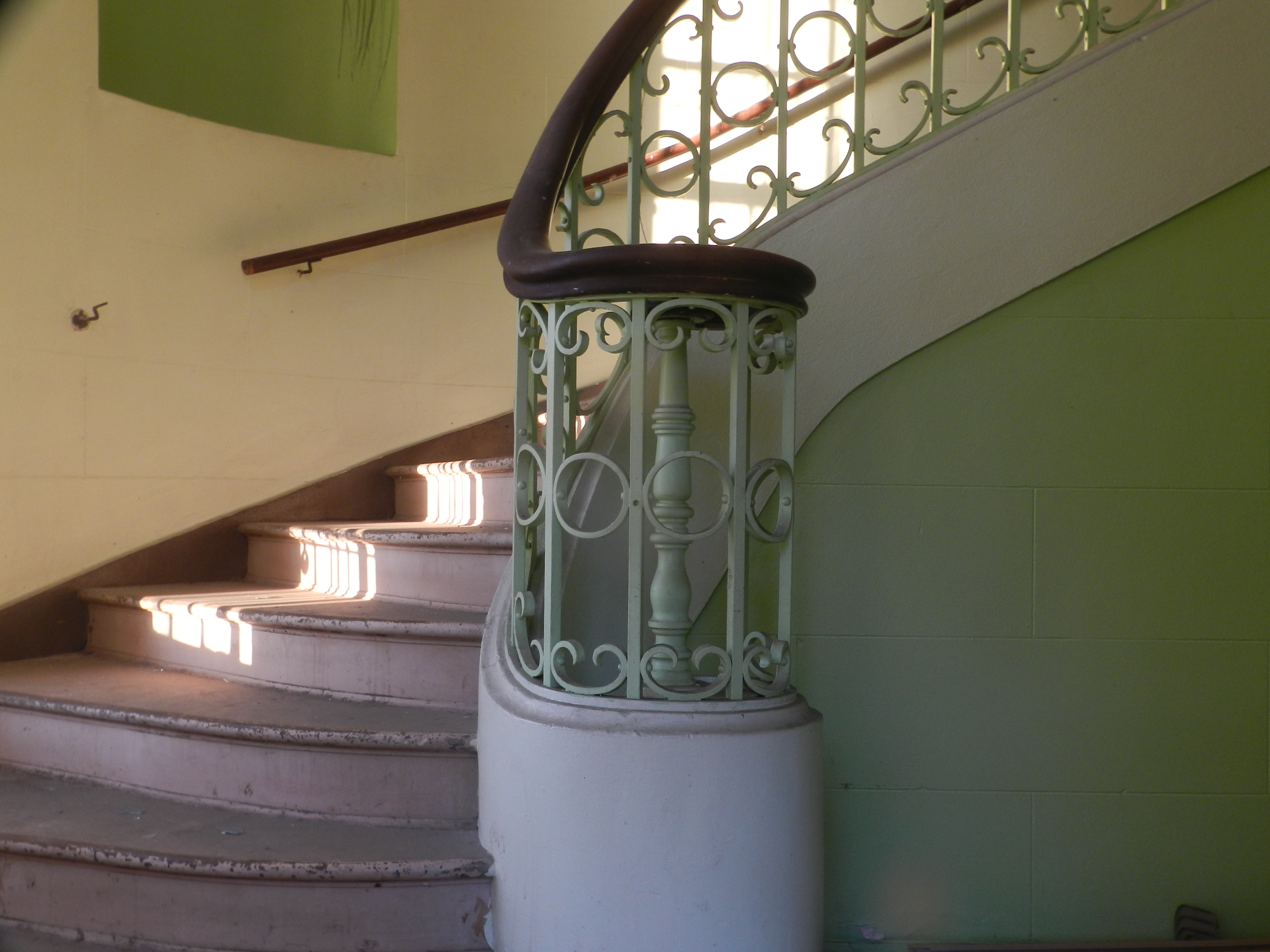
Interior stairway (building closed to the public)
