= Mount Saint Joseph (West Virginia) =

Historic house in West Virginia, United States

- U.S. National Register of Historic Places
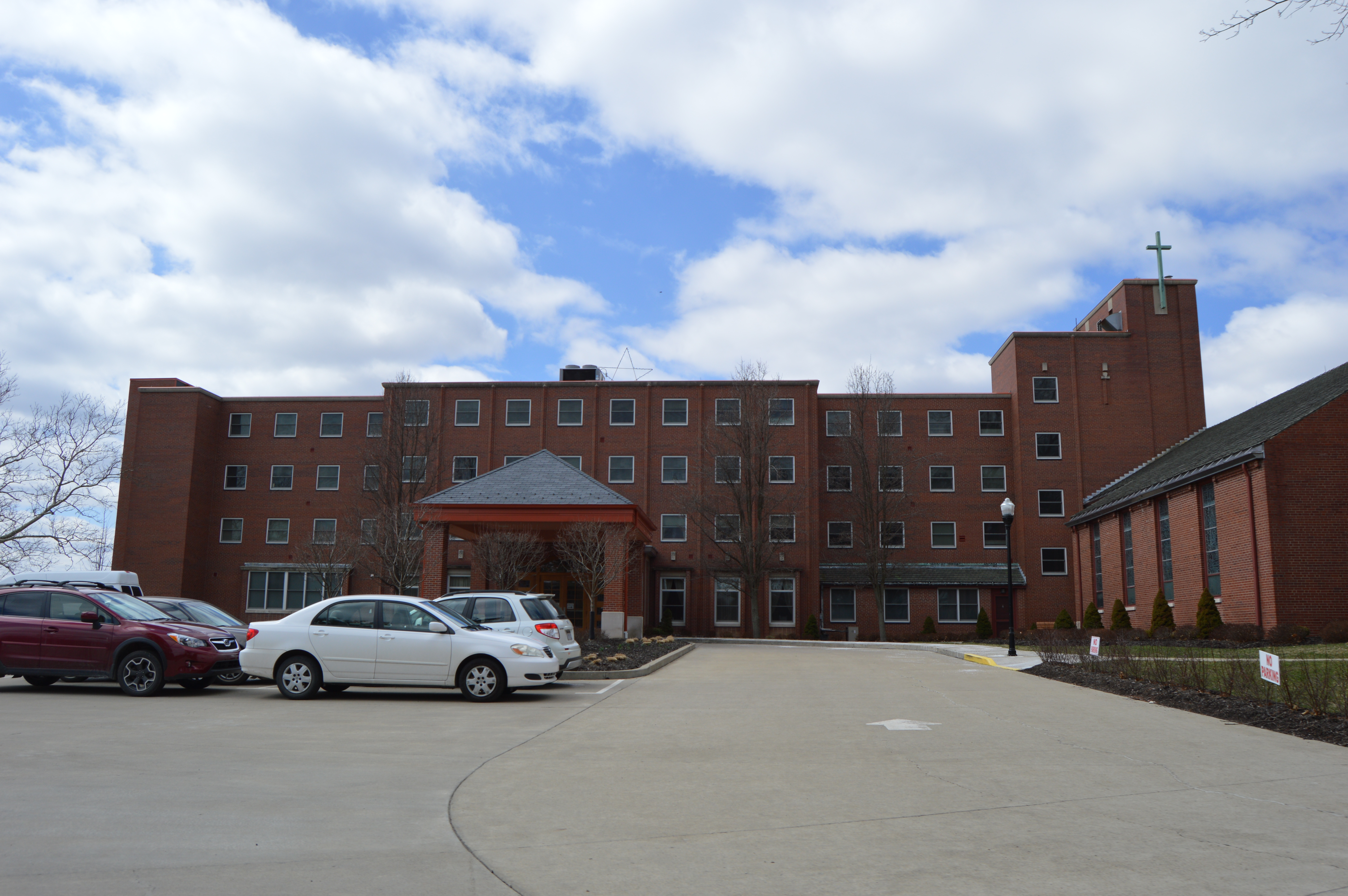
- Motherhouse, seen from the parking lot

- Location within West Virginia Location within the United States
- Location: 137 Mt. Saint Joseph Rd., near Wheeling, West Virginia
- Coordinates: 40°6′49.7304″N 80°39′30.0168″W
- Area: 44 acres (18 ha)
- Built: 1854, 1954-1956
- Architectural style: Modern Movement
- NRHP reference No.: 07001418
- Added to NRHP: January 17, 2008

Mount Saint Joseph, also known as Holloway Estate, is a historic house and motherhouse located near Wheeling, Ohio County, West Virginia. The Holloway House was built in 1854; the original farmhouse is two stories and measures 35 feet by 45 feet. In 1917 it was purchased by W. W. Holloway (1886-1969), the son of prominent Wheeling businessman John Jacob Holloway. W. W. Holloway had married into the Whitaker iron family in 1911 by his marriage to Margaret Louise Glass. They made two additions to the house in the 1920s; one with a garage and apartment above, and an L-shaped addition which became the main living quarters. Located on the property is an immense, three winged structure built as the motherhouse for the Sisters of St. Joseph. It is a Modern building built in 1954–1956. Also on the property are a contributing cold storage building, spring house, and bathhouse.

It was listed on the National Register of Historic Places in 2008.
