= Hayward City Hall =

City hall

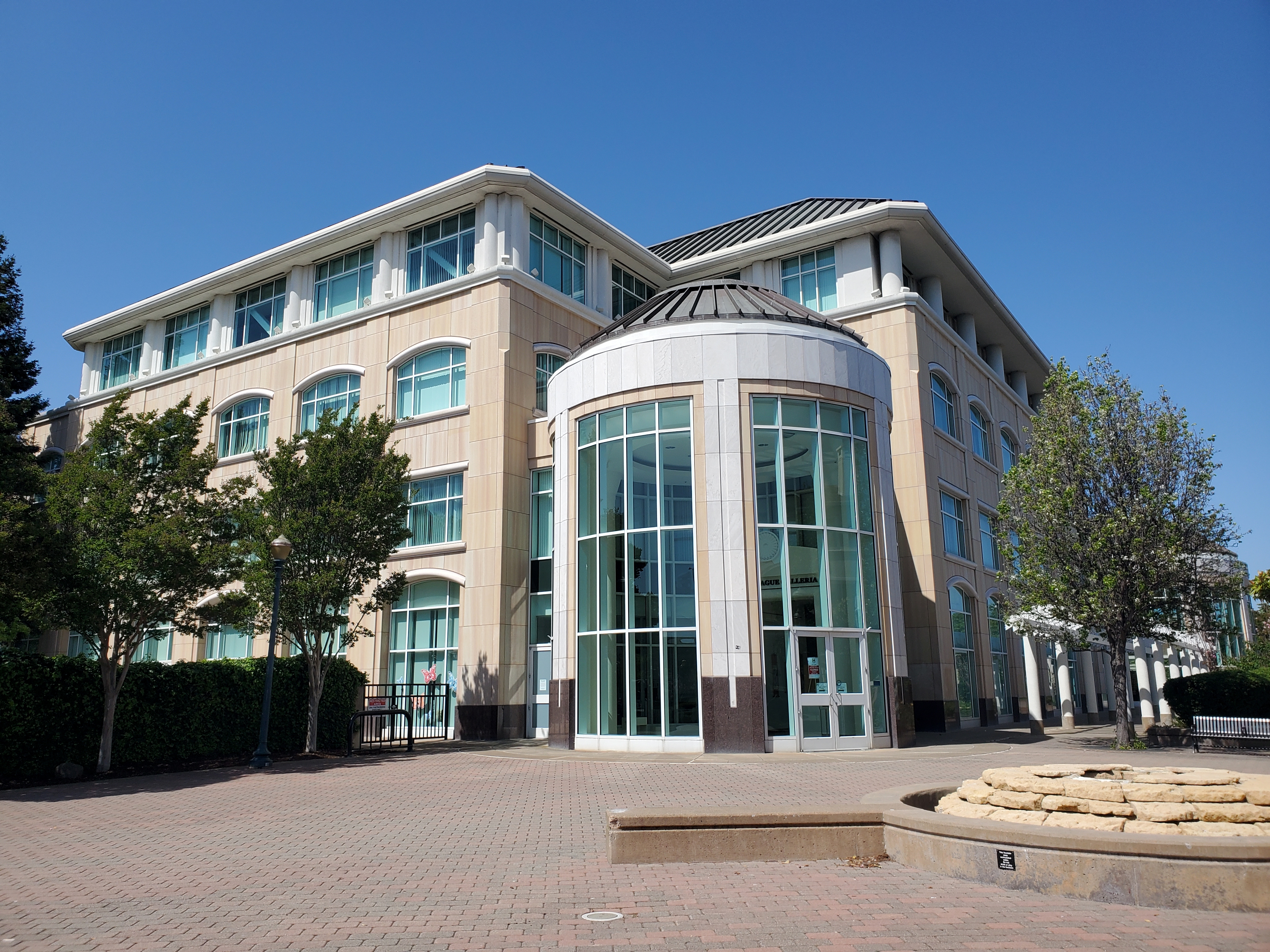
- Hayward City Hall in May 2024
- Interactive map of the Hayward City Hall area

General information
- Status: City Hall
- Location: 777 B Street/Watkins St.
- Coordinates: 37.67112°N 122.08557°W
- Construction started: 1996
- Completed: 1998
- Opening: January 10, 1998
- Owner: City Of Hayward

Technical details
- Floor count: 4

Design and construction
- Architect: Heller Manus Architects
- Developer: Sarfi Regis Group

Hayward City Hall is the third and current Hayward city hall building, located in downtown Hayward, California, United States, next to the Hayward BART station. The city hall opened in January 1998, replacing the abandoned City Center Building, which served as Hayward's city hall for 29 years from 1969 to 1998. Hayward's first city hall, which is also closed to the public, is now in the Alex Giualini Plaza, three blocks away.

== Earthquake preparedness ==
Since the building is located close to the Hayward Fault, it was designed to withstand a major earthquake. The inability of the Hayward City Center building to withstand a major earthquake, shown by damage to it from the 1989 Loma Prieta earthquake, was the main motivation for the new city hall's construction.

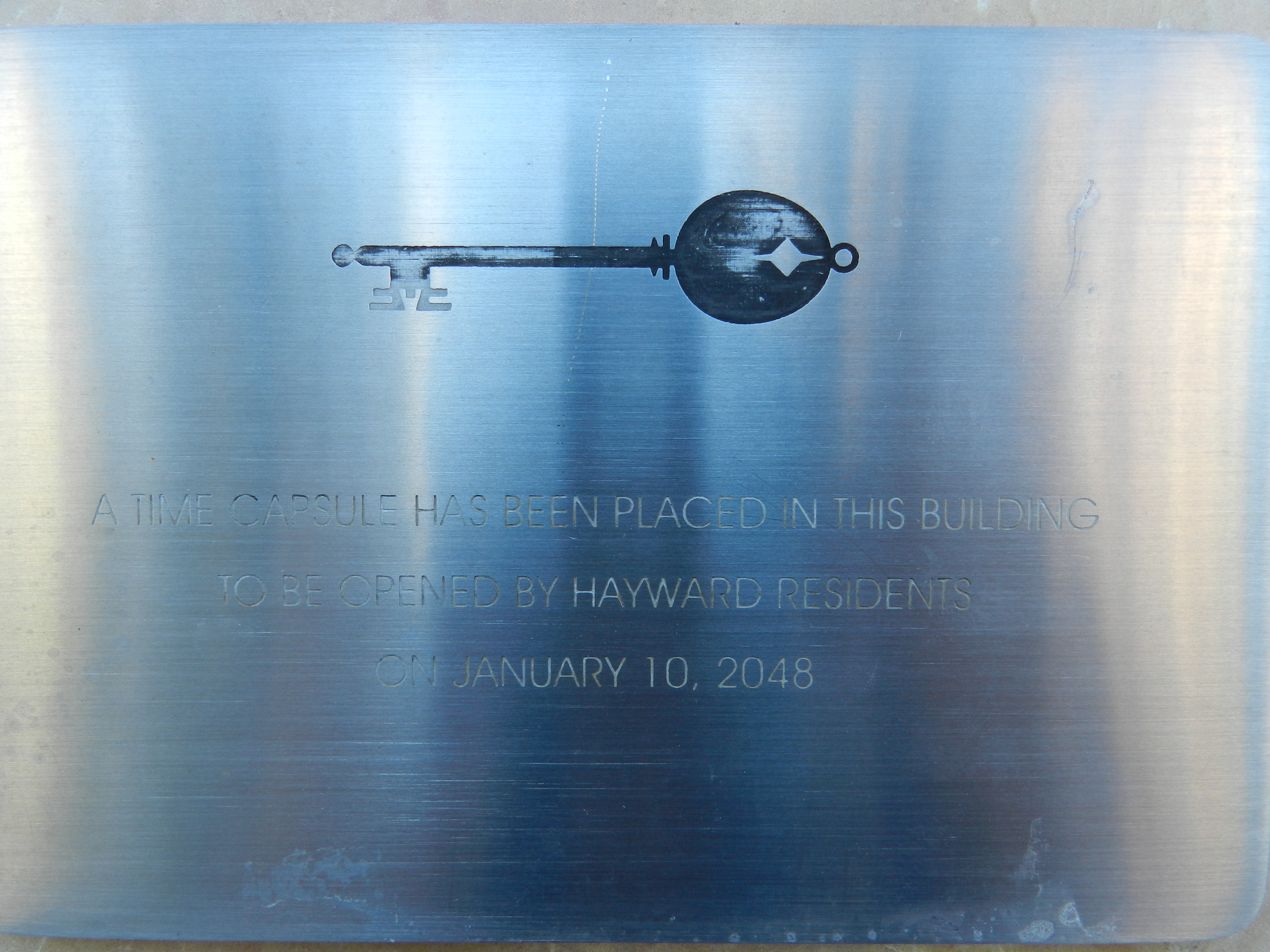
Plaque commemorating the time capsule at City Hall

== Details ==
The interior of the building contains a time capsule, to be opened on January 10, 2048, on the 50th anniversary of the building's dedication.

== Events ==
The park and plaza facing the city hall is host to various city sponsored events, including a weekly farmer's market, and in July, the Hayward-Russell City Blues Festival. The city hall contains an art gallery run by the Hayward Arts Council. in 2011, the gallery hosted a major exhibition of the work of Corita Kent.
