= Warren Hall =

Former building at California State University, East Bay

E. Guy Warren Hall
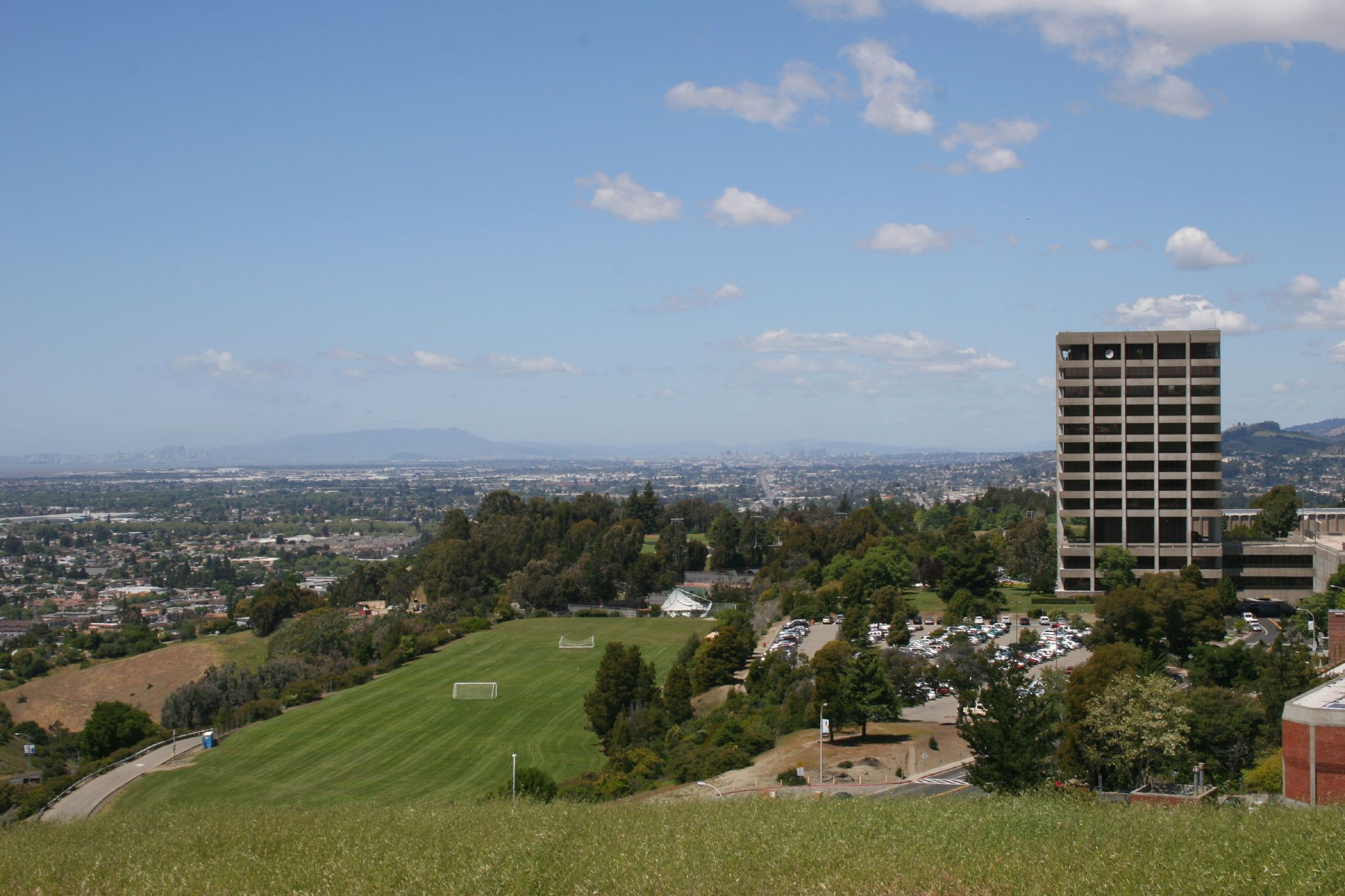
- Warren Hall (right)
- Interactive map of the E. Guy Warren Hall area
- Alternative names: Warren Hall

General information
- Status: Demolished
- Architectural style: Modern
- Location: Hayward, California, West Loop Road, United States
- Coordinates: 37.65537°N 122.0572°W
- Construction started: 1969
- Completed: 1971
- Demolished: August 17, 2013

Technical details
- Floor count: 13

E. Guy Warren Hall, commonly known as Warren Hall, was a 13-story building at California State University, East Bay. It was the signature building of the campus in Hayward, California, overlooking the East Bay region of the San Francisco Bay Area. The building was visible from cities throughout the Bay Area, and served as a landmark for Hayward and the East Bay. It was the tallest building in Hayward at the time, followed by the abandoned City Center Building in downtown Hayward.

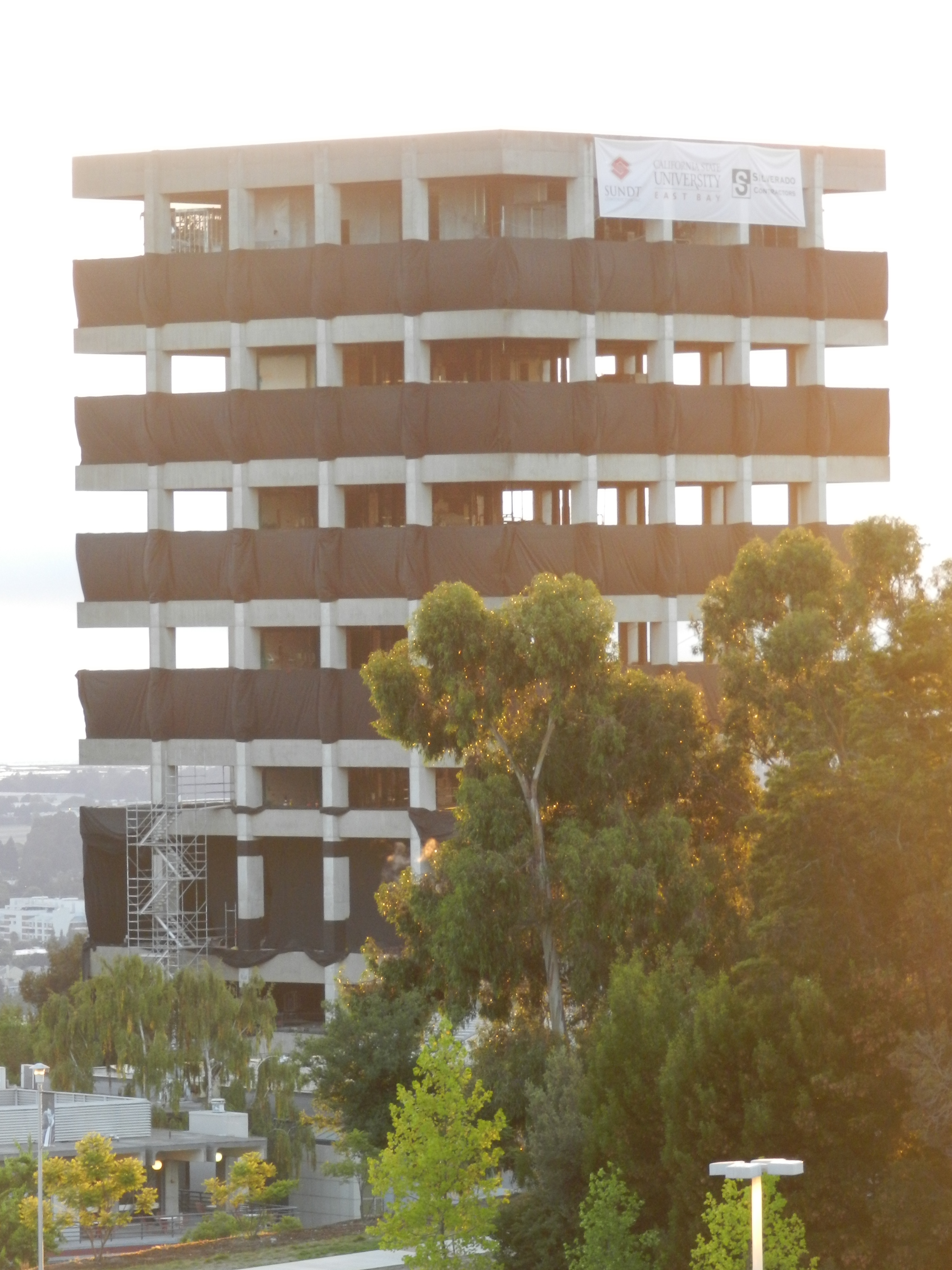
Warren Hall, days prior to demolition

== History ==
The hall was named for E. Guy Warren, a Hayward trucking businessman who helped convince the state of California to open its campus in Hayward.

The building held administration offices and classrooms for 40 years. The president's office was on the top floor and had extensive views.

== Demolition ==
Warren Hall implosion

Warren Hall was rated the least earthquake-safe building in the California State University (CSU) system by the CSU Seismic Review Board. It was built 2000 feet (600 meters) from the Hayward Fault. In January 2013, the CSU Board of Trustees authorized $50 million to demolish the building and replace it with a new structure. Warren Hall was demolished by implosion on August 17, 2013. At the time, construction for a new 67,000 square foot-building was expected to begin in November 2013, with doors expected to open in May 2015. Today the now-demolished Warren Hall has become a parking lot, and there are no current plans to build a new building on it.

== Seismic research ==
The implosion of Warren Hall provided a scientific opportunity to learn more about the Hayward fault.

== See also ==
- CLA Building - another landmark building demolished at California State Polytechnic University, Pomona
