= Centennial Hall Convention Center =

Building in Hayward, California, US

Coordinates: 37.679°N 122.084°W

- Interactive map of Centennial Hall Convention Center
- Former names: Hayward Union High Gymnasium
- Address: 22292 Foothill Boulevard
- Location: Hayward, California
- Owner: City of Hayward
- Capacity: 1,500

Construction
- Opened: 1976
- Closed: 11/01/2009
- Demolished: 2020

The Centennial Hall Convention Center was a former gymnasium and convention center located in downtown Hayward, California, in the City Center complex with the former Centennial Tower. It closed as a convention center on November 1, 2009, and was demolished shortly afterward.

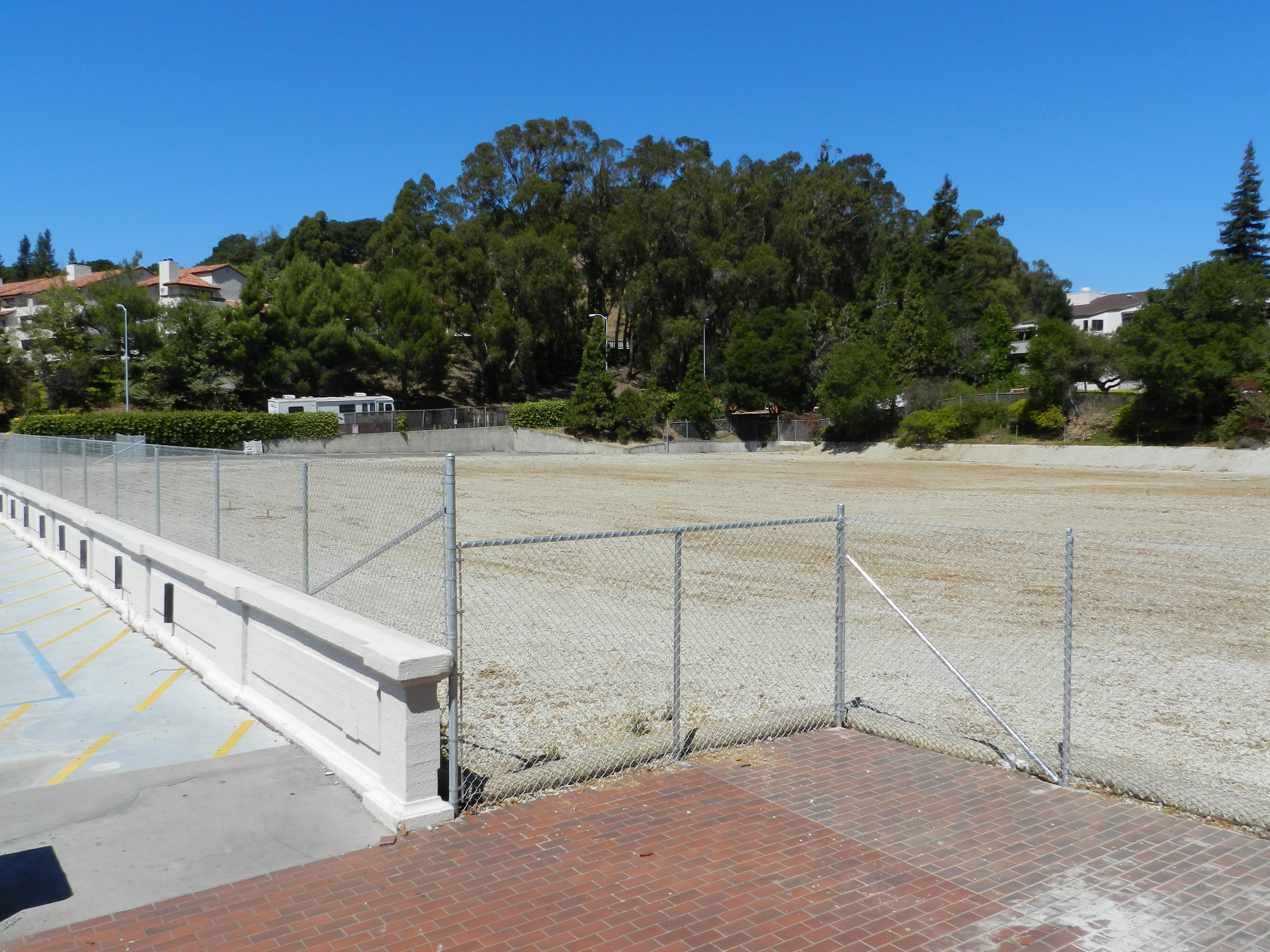
former location of the center (2011)

== History ==
The city of Hayward opened Centennial Hall as a convention center in 1976, in honor of the city's 100th birthday. Before that it was the gymnasium for Hayward Union High School. The hall contained 14,000 square feet (1,300 m^{2}) of exhibit space and a capacity of up to 1,500 for events. It had eight additional rooms totaling 11,448 square feet (1,063.6 m^{2}) and a 1,280-square-foot (119 m^{2}) patio.

Among noteworthy events that occurred at Centennial Hall was an October 1988 campaign appearance by Michael Dukakis, the Democratic nominee for president. It was the venue for Hayward's Gay Prom in 2001.

== See also ==
- List of convention centers in the United States
