= Green Shutter Hotel =

- U.S. National Register of Historic Places
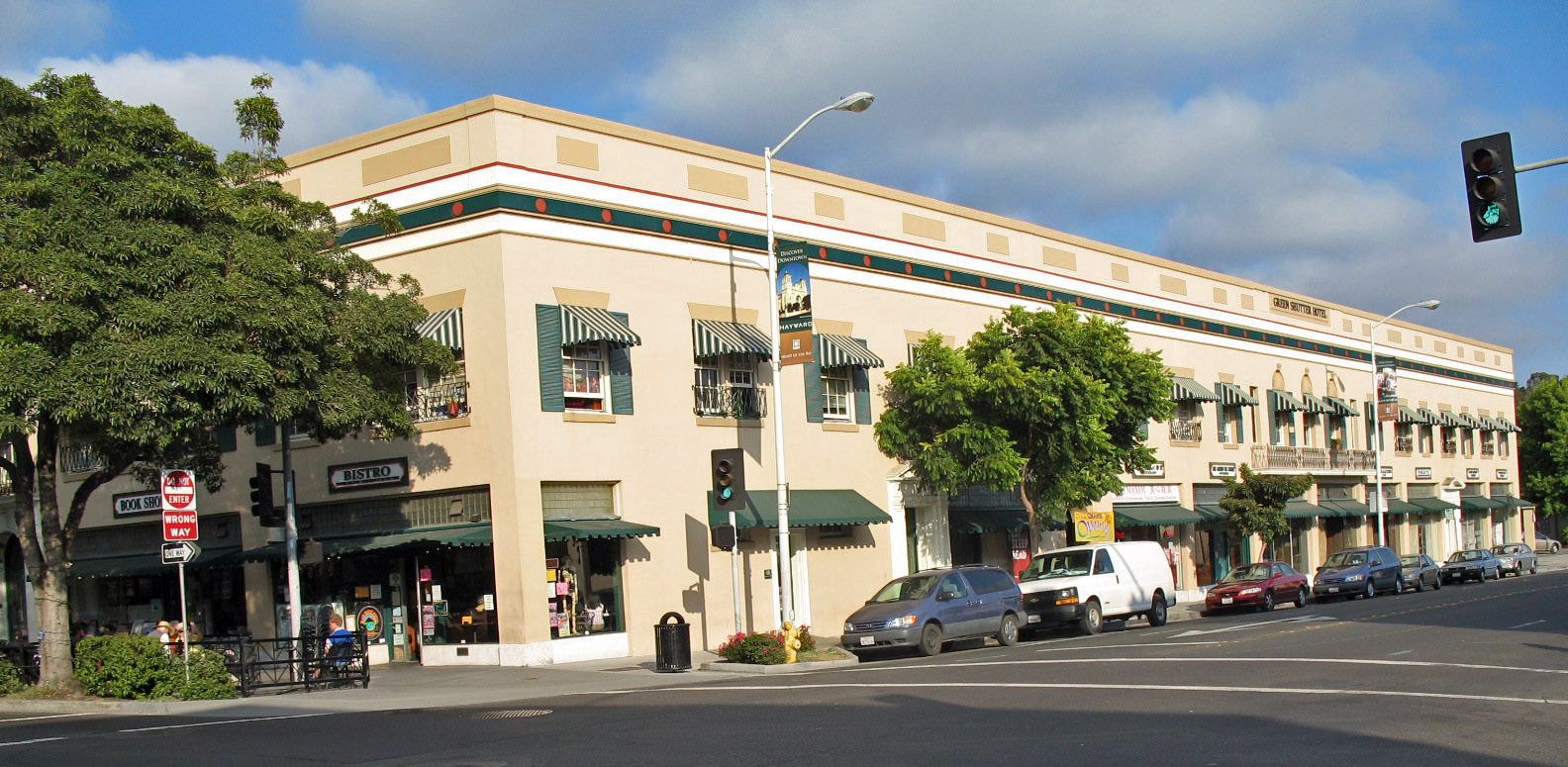
- Green Shutter Hotel, B and Main Streets, with ground floor tenants

- Location within Oakland, California Location within California Location within the United States
- Location: Hayward, California
- Coordinates: 37°40′20.65″N 122°4′55.8″W
- Architectural style: Colonial Revival
- NRHP reference No.: 04000594
- Added to NRHP: June 16, 2004

The Green Shutter Hotel is a historic hotel building located in downtown Hayward in Alameda County, California, United States. The building was listed on the National Register of Historic Places in 2004, and is on the California Register of Historical Resources.

== History ==
The land where the building resides was first purchased in the mid 1860s by an immigrant named Joseph Rivers. Rivers opened a small blacksmith shop which he later sold in 1878 to Henry Eggert. Eggert expanded the building and sold plows and wagons out of it until the shop was inherited by his sons, Henry Jr., and Herbert. By 1920 the brothers would expand the structure which was first used as a hotel after a large addition in 1926 commissioned to the architect George L.F. O'Brien. The hotel originally had 55 rooms on the second floor and retail space below.

The hotel officially opened on August 21, 1926. Existing near to the highly trafficked Lincoln Highway and being the largest hotel in Hayward at the time, the hotel saw high occupancy rates in its early years.

The hotel would become the site of downtown Hayward's first public parking lot.

By the 1970s, the hotel rooms would be converted to apartments.

== Today ==
It is currently used commercially, and houses the Green Shutter Hotel (a single room occupancy) on the second floor, with retail businesses on the ground floor, including The Bistro, a pub and music venue, and The Book Shop, now closed, an independent bookstore and at the time the only bookstore in Hayward.

In 2017, the interior of the second floor of the building was largely gutted, shutting down the residential hotel. Some ground floor businesses are still operating. The building has 88 apartment units.

== See also ==
- National Register of Historic Places listings in Alameda County, California
- List of hotels in California
