= Mount Saint Joseph Academy =

Mount Saint Joseph Academy may refer to:

- Mount St. Joseph Academy (West Hartford, Connecticut)
- Saint Joseph Preparatory High School, Boston, Massachusetts, formerly the Mount Saint Joseph Academy
- Mount Saint Joseph Academy (Buffalo, New York), now closed
- Mount Saint Joseph Academy (Flourtown, Pennsylvania), an all-female Catholic college
- Mount Saint Joseph Academy (Rutland, Vermont)
