= Hayward High School (California) =

Location
- 1633 East Avenue; Hayward, California 94541; United States; 37°40′20″N 122°4′5″W

Information
- Type: Public high school
- Motto: Personal Responsibility In Delivering Excellence
- Established: 1892; 134 years ago
- School district: Hayward Unified School District
- Principal: Waylon Miller
- Teaching staff: 83.19 (FTE)
- Grades: 9–12
- Enrollment: 1,667 (2023–2024)
- Student to teacher ratio: 20.04
- Campus type: Suburban
- Colors: Black and gold
- Athletics: 49 teams in 15 sports
- Mascot: Farmer
- API average: 688 (2012-13)
- Newspaper: The Haywire
- Yearbook: The Agrarian
- Website: hhs.husd.us

Hayward High School is a public high school in Hayward, California, United States, serving students living in northern Hayward and portions of Castro Valley, Cherryland and Fairview. It is one of four high schools in the city and is one of the oldest high schools in Northern California. The school's official mascot is the "Farmer", which dates back to Hayward's period as an agricultural center. Its emblem features a farmer with a plow, a reference to the city's agricultural past.

== History ==
Founded in 1892, Hayward High is one of the oldest high schools in the San Francisco Bay Area. The first true high school that opened in 1893 was called Union High School #3. It served students from Hayward, Castro Valley, San Lorenzo, Redwood, Palomares, and Stonybrook. Initially, it was a one-story building with a basement.

As late as the 1960s, students still rode their horses to school and tied them to hitching posts. As the number of students exceeded the campus' limit, the site was expanded from 10 to 30 acres (120,000 m^{2}). The architecture for the new buildings included ionic columns, low-pitched roofs, and friezes of Greek Gods. This building, built in 1911, lasted until Hayward High moved to its current campus in 1962, to make way for the City Center Building.

Frederic Johnson was principal of the school from the 1911 opening to 1935. The school gymnasium became the now demolished Centennial Convention Center.

== Demographics ==
Hayward High had an enrollment of 1,667 students in the 2023–2024 school year. Their ethnic makeup was:

- 67.6% Hispanic/Latino
- 11.8% African American
- 4.5% White
- 4.4% Asian
- 4.0% Filipino
- 4.0% Two or more races
- 2.9% Native Hawaiian/Pacific Islander
- 0.5% American Indian or Alaska Native
- 0.4% Not reported

== Notable alumni ==
- Mahershala Ali, Academy Award winning actor (transferred to Mt. Eden High School)
- Chauncey Bailey, journalist, editor-in-chief of The Oakland Post
- Jeff Barnes, National Football League linebacker, Los Angeles and Oakland Raiders from 1977 to 1987
- Davion Berry (born 1991), basketball player in the Israeli Basketball Premier League
- C. J. Brown, soccer player, Major League Soccer, Chicago Fire
- D. J. Carrasco, MLB baseball player, Kansas City Royals
- Frank Cope, National Football League offensive tackle, New York Giants from 1938 to 1947
- Jack Del Rio, former NFL head coach, Oakland Raiders
- Chris Eckert, actor and member of The Groundlings
- Tom Eplin, actor
- Ed Galigher, National Football League defensive lineman, New York Jets and San Francisco 49ers from 1972 to 1978
- Mark Goodson, TV game show producer
- Samora Goodson, wide receiver including for the San Jose SaberCats in 2008 and 2011–2013
- Eddie House, point guard, Miami Heat and 2008 NBA champion Boston Celtics
- Prerna Lal, writer and attorney
- Laura Lam, speculative fiction author
- Eric Lane, National Football League running back, Seattle Seahawks from 1981 to 1987
- Jon Miller, Major League Baseball announcer
- Landon Curt Noll (1979), astronomer, cryptographer and mathematician
- Diamon Simpson (born 1987), basketball player in the Israel Basketball Premier League
- Don Wakamatsu, Manager of the Seattle Mariners; first Asian-American Major League Baseball manager; bench coach Oakland A's, Texas Rangers
- Bill Walsh, Pro Football Hall of Fame head coach San Francisco 49ers and Stanford University football head coach
- Adrian Ward, cornerback, UTEP, Minnesota Vikings
- Andre Ward, Olympic gold medalist, 2004 Olympics boxing champion
- Michael Darren Young, outfielder and designated hitter, Major League Baseball
