= The International MS Journal =

- Discipline: Multiple sclerosis
- Language: English
- Edited by: Douglas Goodin

Publication details
- History: 1994-present
- Publisher: Cambridge Medical Publications
- Frequency: Triannual

Standard abbreviations
- ISO 4: Int. MS J.

Indexing
- ISSN: 1352-8963
- OCLC no.: 39459790

Links
- Journal homepage

The International MS Journal, a medical journal published by Cambridge Medical Publications carrying reviews on multiple sclerosis, ceased publication in 2011. The journal was edited by Douglas Goodin, researcher and director of the UCSF Multiple Sclerosis Center; it was also the host of MSForum.net
