= Hayward station (BART) =

Metro station in Hayward, California, US

Hayward
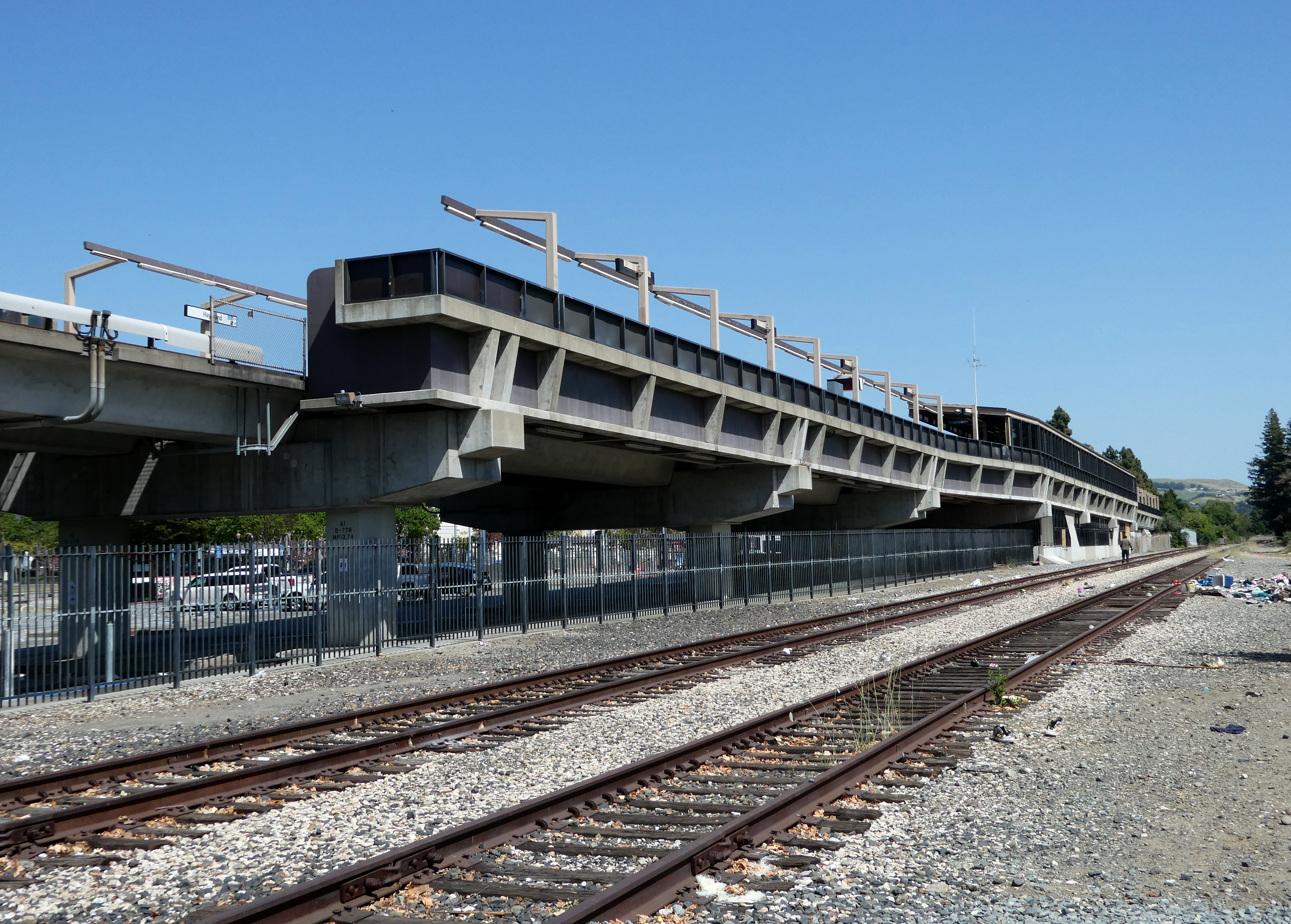
- Hayward station and adjacent freight tracks in May 2024

General information
- Location: 699 B Street; Hayward, California
- Coordinates: 37.6697°N 122.0870°W
- Line: BART A-Line
- Platforms: 2 side platforms
- Tracks: 2
- Connections: AC Transit: M, 10, 28, 34, 41, 56, 60, 83, 86, 93, 94, 95, 99, 801; CSU East Bay shuttle; Greyhound

Construction
- Structure type: Elevated
- Parking: 1,473 spaces
- Cycle facilities: 20 lockers
- Accessible: Yes
- Architect: Wurster, Bernardi, & Emmons

Other information
- Station code: BART: HAYW

History
- Opened: September 11, 1972

Passengers
- 2025: 2,400 (weekday average)

Services
| Preceding station | Bay Area Rapid Transit | Following station |
|---|---|---|
| Bay Fair toward Daly City | Green Line | South Hayward toward Berryessa |
| Bay Fair toward Richmond | Orange Line | South Hayward toward Berryessa |
Former services at WP station
| Preceding station | Western Pacific Railroad | Following station |
|---|---|---|
| San Leandro toward Oakland | Feather River Route | Decoto toward Salt Lake City |
Location

Hayward station is a Bay Area Rapid Transit (BART) station in Hayward, California, serving Downtown Hayward and the surrounding areas. It is served by the Orange and Green lines. The elevated station has two side platforms. A two-lane bus terminal is located on the northeast side of the station. A pedestrian tunnel under the Union Pacific Railroad Oakland Subdivision connects the fare lobby to a parking lot and a five-level parking garage.

== History ==
=== Western Pacific ===
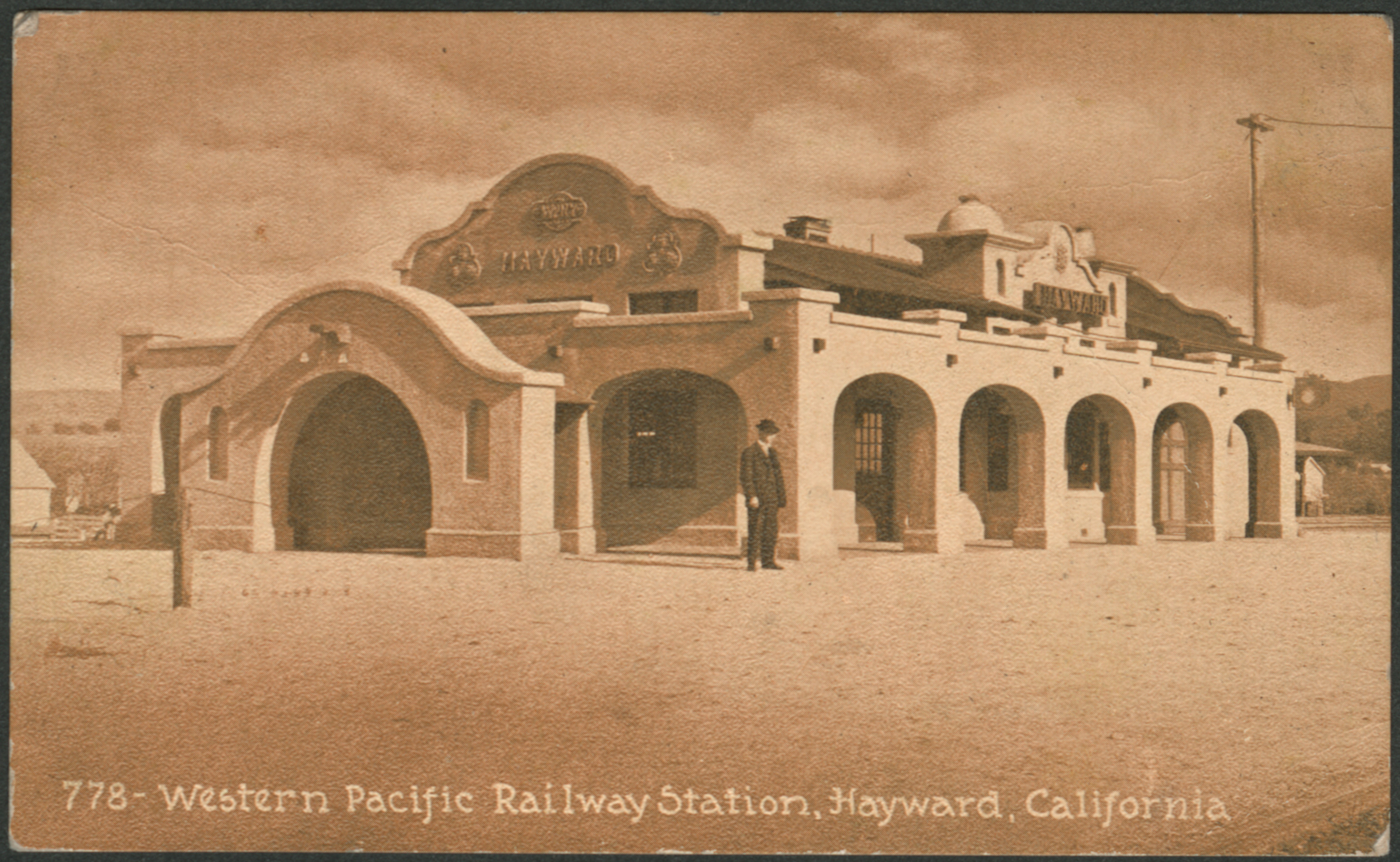
Hayward station in the 1910s

The Western Pacific Railroad (WP) opened through Hayward in 1909. Passenger service began on August 22, 1910; both of the two daily round trips stopped at Haywards (later renamed Hayward). A local train timed for commuting to Oakland and San Francisco was added on October 1. A Mission-style station building, located between C Street and D Street, was built by 1911. The WP promised to operate hourly Oakland–Hayward service using motor railcars, but failed to do so. The commuter train was discontinued in 1914, leaving just two daily round trips.

One of the two daily round trips ceased stopping at Hayward and other local stations in January 1919. The WP reduced service on the line to one daily train (the Scenic Limited) during the 1930s, but added the Exposition Flyer in 1939. Hayward continued to be a flag stop served by only one daily round trip (the Feather River Express, then the Royal Gorge) until 1950, when the three-day-a-week Zephyrette replaced the daily Royal Gorge. The Zephyrette was discontinued in October 1960, ending Western Pacific service to Hayward and other East Bay local stops not served by the California Zephyr. The station remained open for freight into 1960s.

The Southern Pacific Railroad had a separate Hayward station to the west of the downtown area. It was closed in 1941 and reopened for Amtrak service in 1997.

=== BART ===
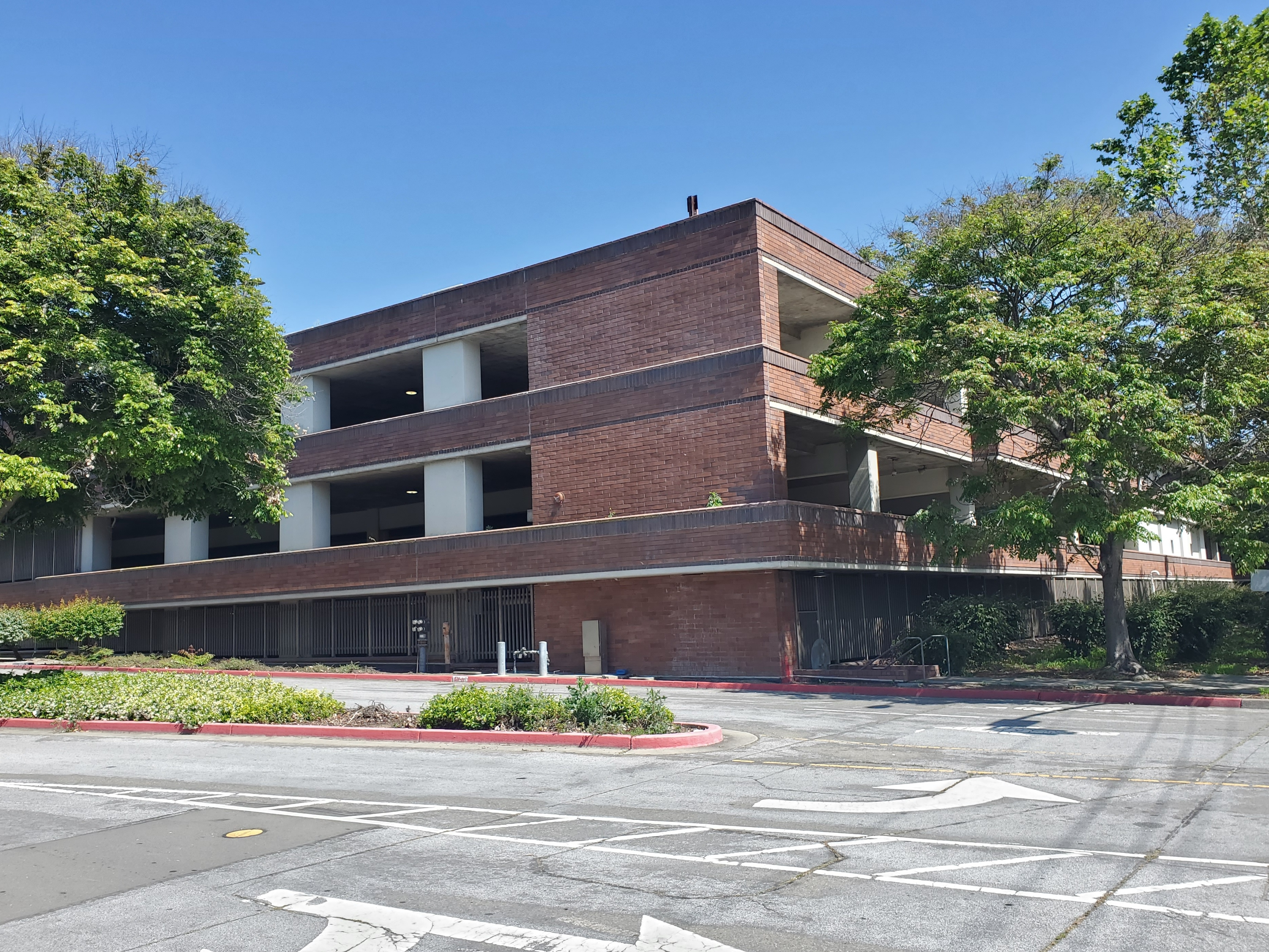
The 1998-opened parking garage

BART built its Fremont line using the Western Pacific alignment (Oakland Subdivision), with a station just north of the former WP station site. The city had initially wanted the line to be built in the median of the Foothill Freeway – which itself was never constructed – north of the WP alignment. The BART Board approved the name "Hayward" for the station in December 1965. A $1.21 million construction contract was awarded in June 1968. The station opened on September 11, 1972. Due to a national strike that year by elevator constructors, elevator construction on the early stations was delayed. Elevators at most of the initial stations, including Hayward, were completed in the months following the opening.

AC Transit bus service began serving Hayward station when it opened. On November 21, 1977, SamTrans began operating service between Hayward station and San Mateo via the San Mateo–Hayward Bridge. It was discontinued in August 1999. AC Transit resumed service over the bridge in March 2003, operating its route M between Castro Valley and Hillsdale via Hayward. The route was cut back from Castro Valley to Hayward in March 2010, and was suspended in 2020.

A transit-oriented development (TOD) project, which replaced the surface parking lots on the northeast and south sides of the station, was completed in 1998. It included a parking garage, townhomes, a new city hall, and a Greyhound Lines bus station. Seismic retrofitting of the parking garage took place in 2009–2010. Installation of second-generation faregates at the BART station took place in December 2024. As of 2024, BART anticipates soliciting developer proposals by 2028 for additional TOD at the station.

== Bus connections ==
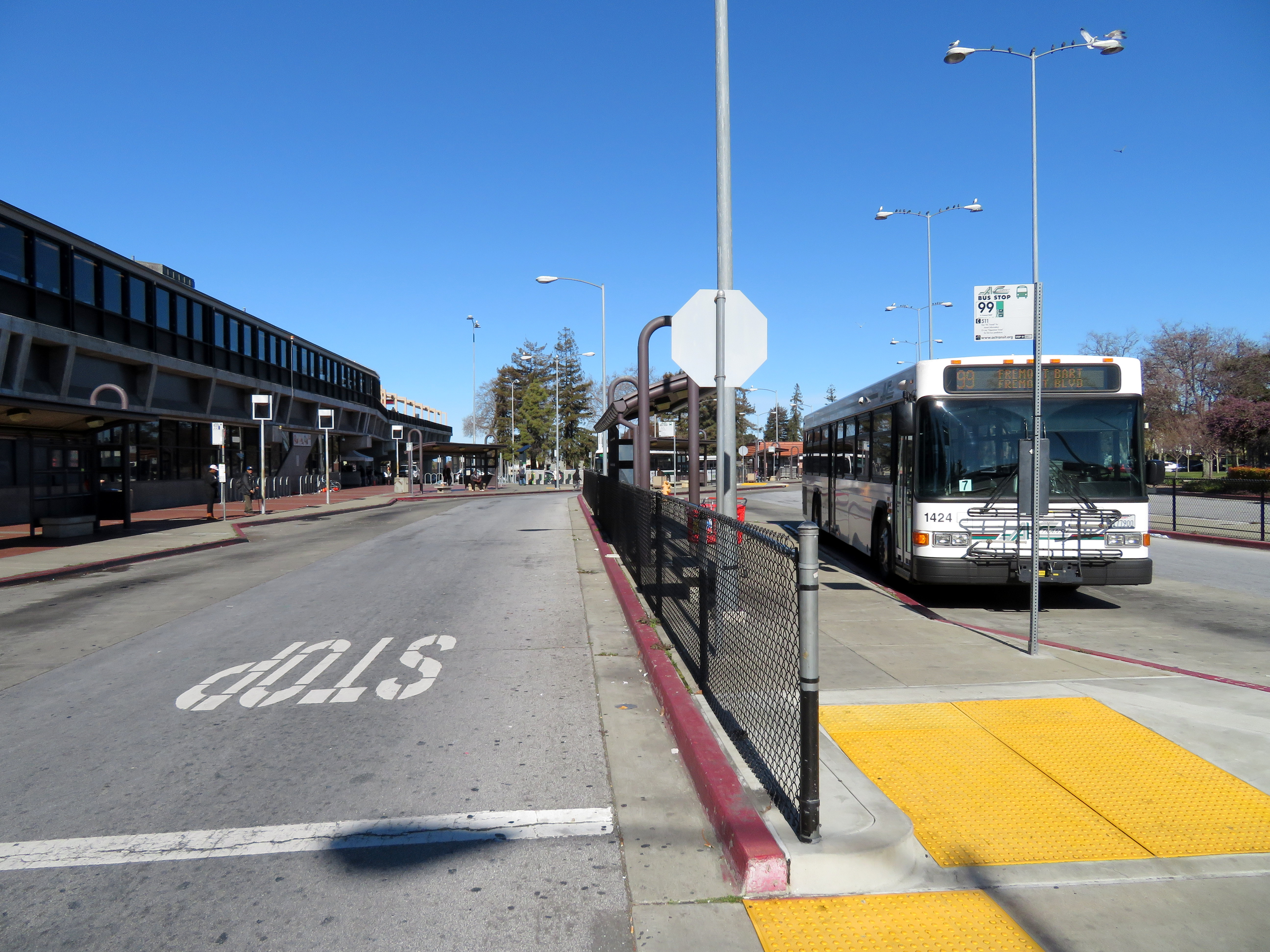
An AC Transit bus at Hayward station

Hayward station is a major bus hub for AC Transit, served by Transbay route M; local routes 10, 28, 34, 41, 56, 60, 83, 86, 93, 94, 95, and 99; and All Nighter route 801.

Shuttles to California State University, East Bay also serve the station. A small building near B Street is the Greyhound intercity bus stop.

SamTrans Transbay buses served the station until mid-1999.
