= Downtown Hayward =

Human settlement in Hayward, California, United States

Coordinates: 37°40′24.66″N 122°4′52.72″W

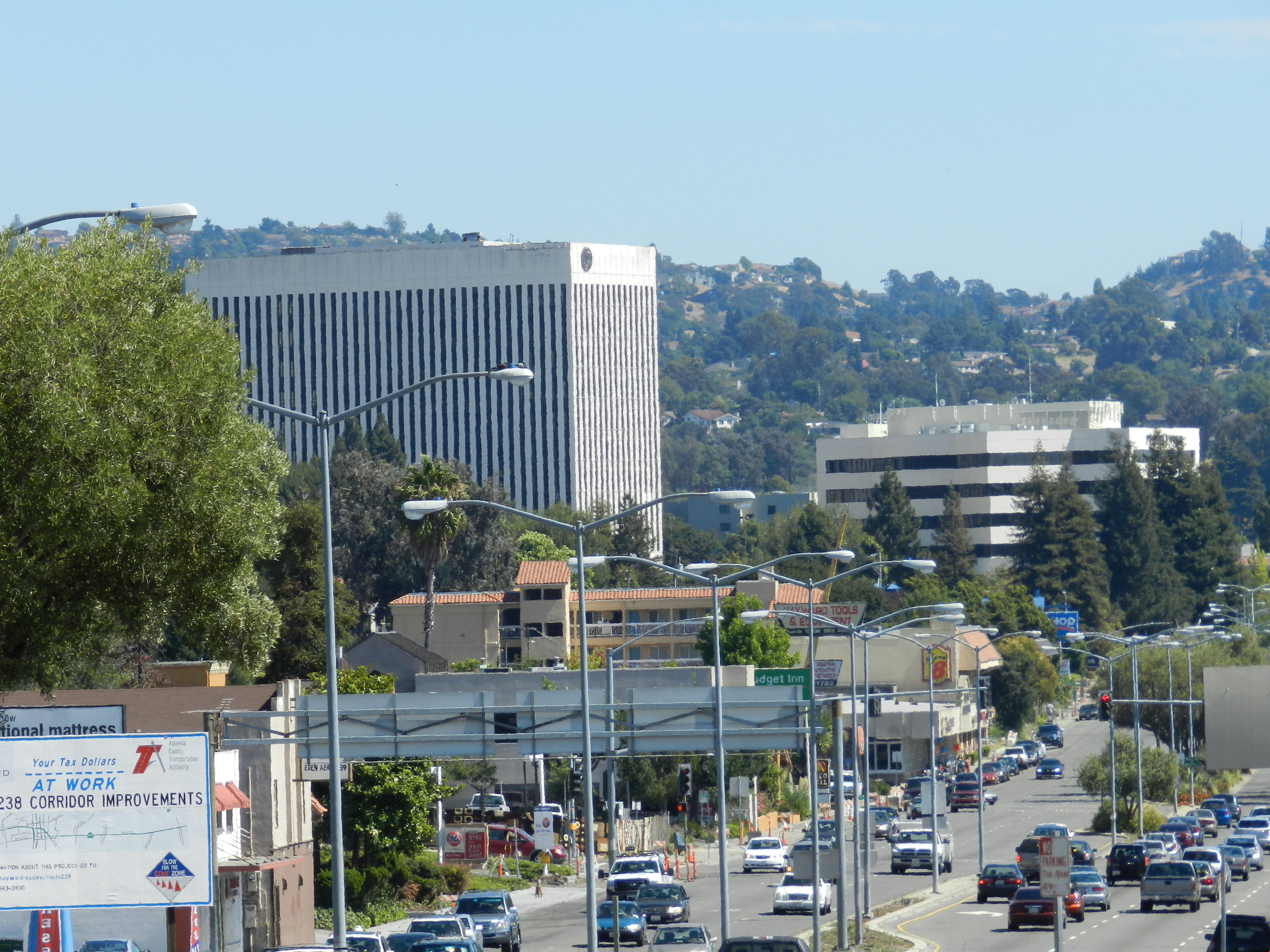
Downtown Hayward, looking south on Foothill Boulevard, with the now demolished City Center Building (left)

Downtown Hayward is the original and current central business district of Hayward, California, United States, and is home to the current Hayward City Hall, along with the two previous city halls, Alex Giualini Plaza and the City Center Building. The Hayward Fault runs through the area, and is the cause of the two previous city halls being taken out of use.

The boundaries are Third Street to the east, Grand Street and Hayward BART to the west, Jackson Street and E Street to the south, and City Center Drive/Hazel Avenue to the north. Foothill Boulevard was known as "The Golden Strip", a retail business corridor that was built in the 1950s, and housed Capwell's and I. Magnin department stores. The street lost businesses after the opening of Southland Mall in 1964. Parks include Newman Park and The Julio Bras Portuguese Park. San Lorenzo Creek runs through downtown. The Hayward Public Library is located there. "Hayward City Center" a mall and building complex located at the northern end of downtown, contains the City Center Building, which served as the city's second city hall from 1969 to 1991, and is now an abandoned 11 story building, Hayward's tallest building, formerly the second tallest prior to California State University, East Bay's Warren Hall demolition in 2013. The City Center complex previously contained the now demolished Centennial Hall Convention Center. The bankrupt Mervyns department store chain's large former headquarters is across the street from the City Center mall. The Hayward Area Historical Society operates a museum downtown, which relocated and re-opened June 2014. The FBI operates a resident agency in downtown Hayward. The Hayward Art Council, founded in 1975, operates the Sun Gallery downtown. The Independent Order of Odd Fellows building on B Street is one of Hayward's oldest buildings, and was built in 1868. The Hayward 9/11 Memorial was dedicated May 30, 2016, to the first responders who died in 9/11, and to the city's own fallen first responders, and the city's fallen soldiers.

== Cinema Place ==
Cinema Place is a 12,000-square-foot (1,100 m^{2}) entertainment and shopping center, comprising a single structure, which opened on October 24, 2008. Directly adjacent to the center is a large city run parking garage. The City of Hayward has commissioned 3 large murals, designed by Hayward artist Andrew Kong Knight, decorating the exterior of the garage, featuring scenes from Hollywood and Hayward, which are being executed in 2011. An additional mural by Knight is found at the northern end of The Hayward Strip. Hayward's Public Mural Art Program has won a Helen Putnam Award of Excellence.

The main tenant is a Century Theatre multiplex, which is Hayward's lone movie theater since Mann's Festival Cinemas closed in 2003. In 2011, the Hayward Art Council opened a gallery on the ground floor of the center, in a storefront that had remained unused since the center's opening.

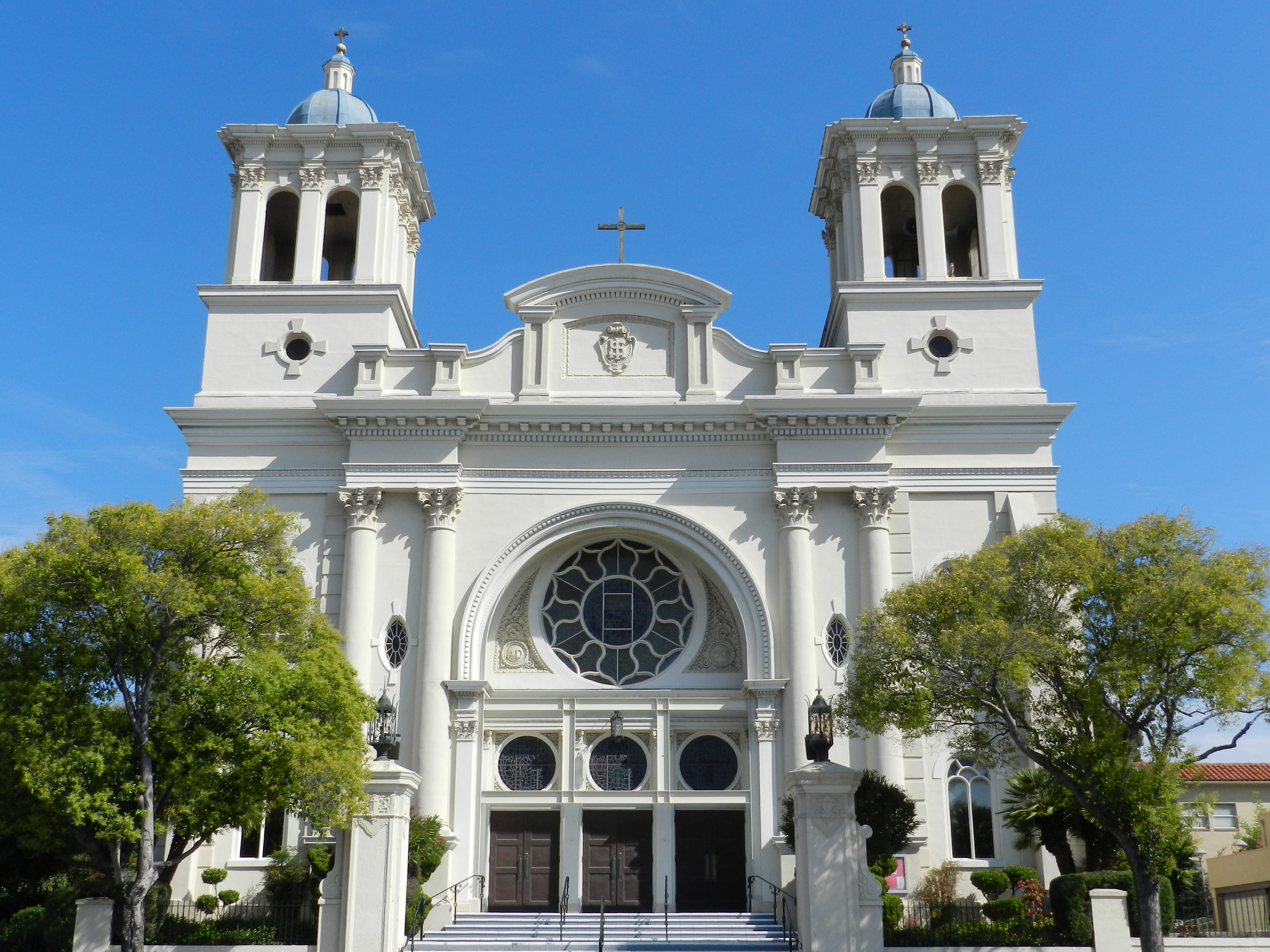
All Saints Catholic Church

== Other businesses ==
The Green Shutter Hotel, a California Historical Landmark, is located downtown. The Daily Review newspaper operated from downtown, until its closure in 2016. High Scores Arcade Museum (a retro video game arcade) also has a location downtown.

== Services ==
The All Saints Catholic Church is located downtown. It operates the Mount Saint Joseph Cemetery. The Hayward Veterans' Memorial Building, built in 1932, is adjacent to the old City Hall building, and is available for public events. The Hayward Area Historical Society opened a new museum, galleries, and an events venue in June 2014.

== Road improvements ==
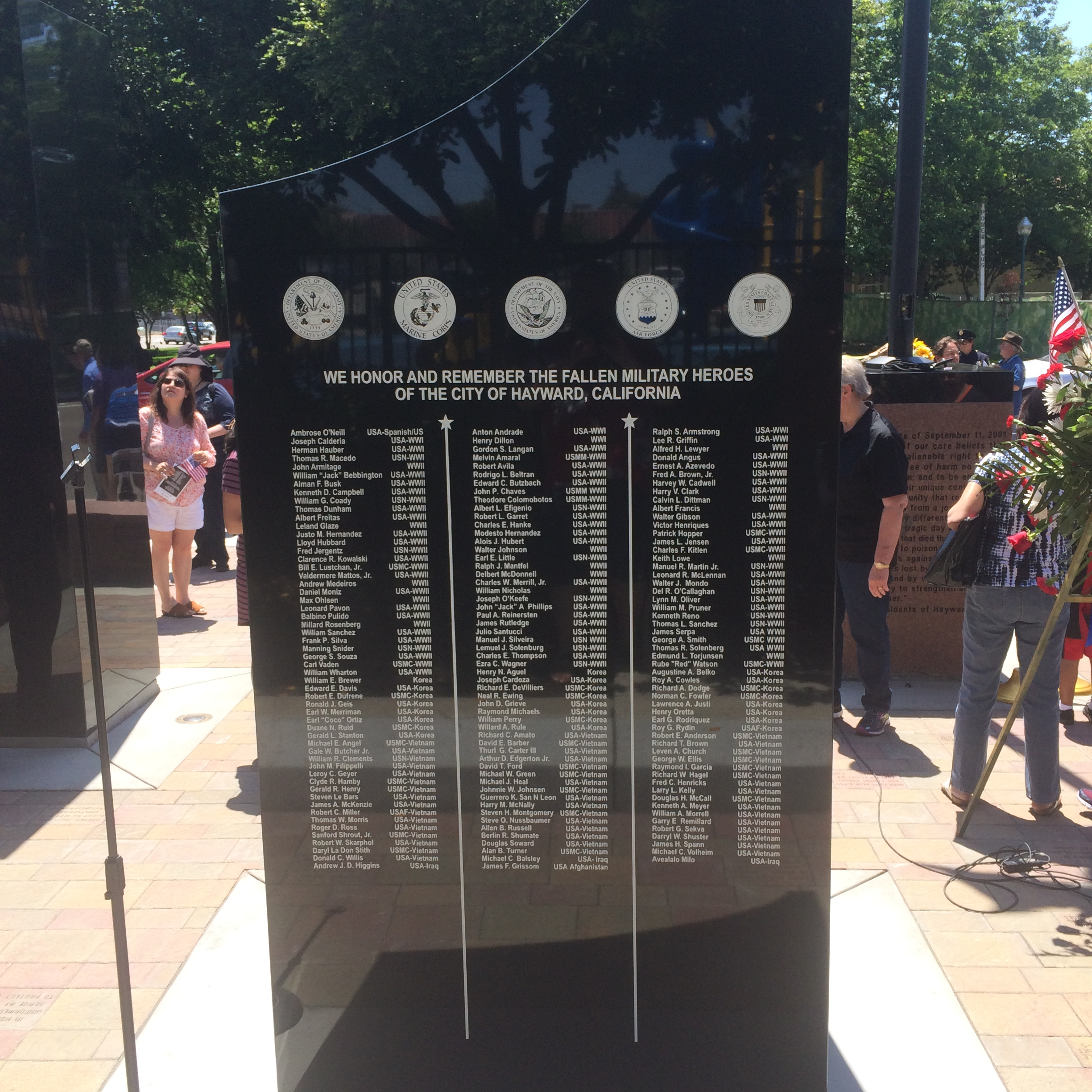
Hayward 9/11 Memorial

The Route 238 Corridor Improvement Project broke ground July 2010, with an expected completion date in 2013. It will include undergrounding of telephone wires, and extensive landscaping, bringing parks and improved traffic flow to the downtown region. A one-way traffic loop for sections of A Street, Foothill Boulevard and Mission Boulevard went into effect March 15, 2013. The Foothill Boulevard business district is also scheduled to receive a $2.85 million facelift, partly through $1.1 million in loans, improving the storefront facades and other amenities. New businesses opening include a microdistillery to be operated by Buffalo Bill's Brewery.

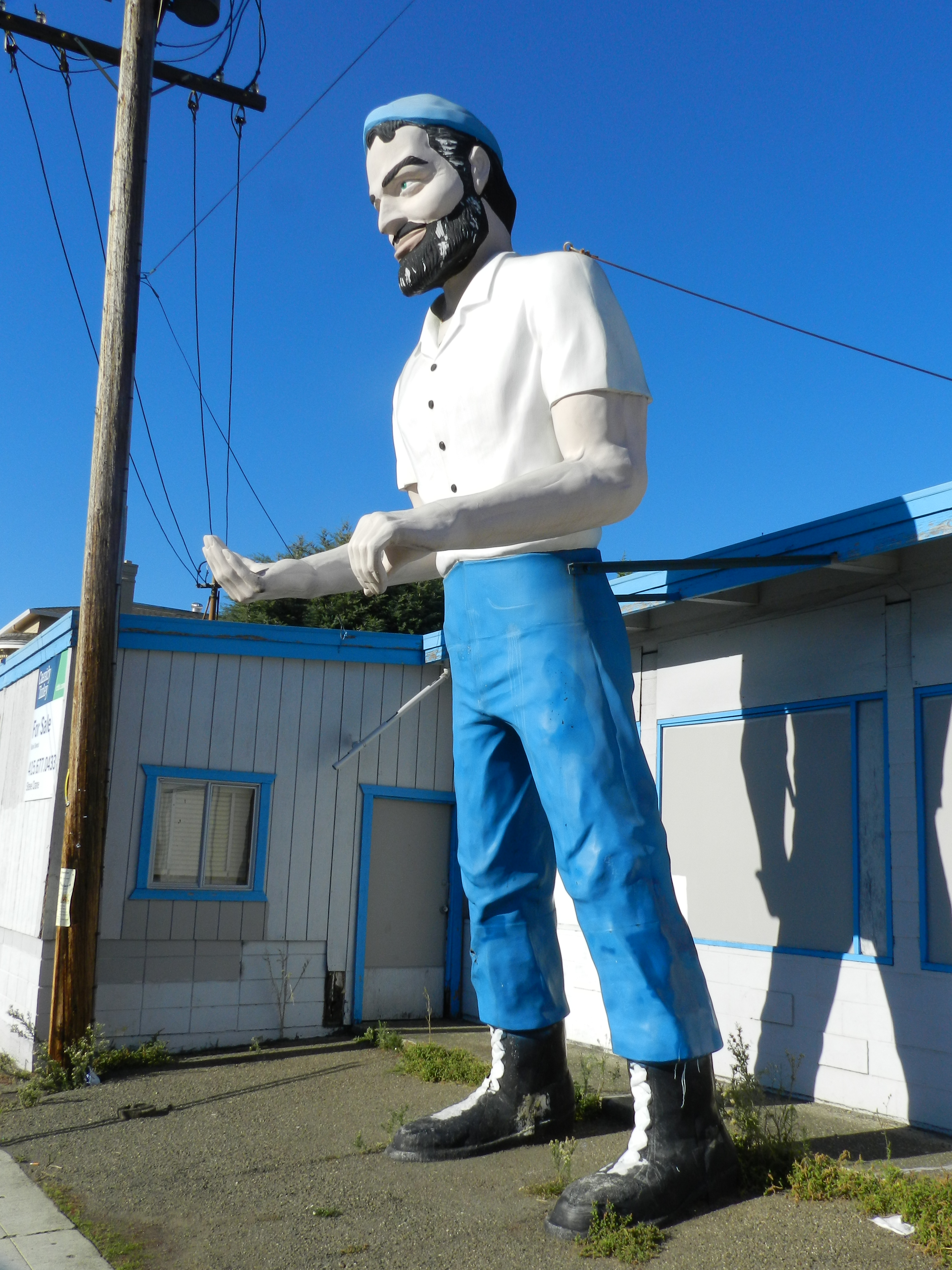
"Big Mike", "Muffler Man", a long-time fixture on Mission Boulevard (removed in 2011, moved to south Hayward in 2013)
