= Criticisms of Cargill =

Criticism of the multinational agribusiness

This article addresses various criticisms of Cargill, a privately held agribusiness multinational giant with operations in 70 countries and its headquarters in Minneapolis, Minnesota, in the United States. Cargill Inc has been owned by the Cargill family for 154 years. It is the largest privately owned corporation in the United States, with an annual revenue of $113.5 billion in 2019.

Concerns have been raised about Cargill's environmental and human rights record in a number of industries and countries by the Roundtable on Sustainable Palm Oil (RSPO) and other organizations since at least the early 2000s. As a highly influential company, Cargill has been called upon to reduce its negative industrial, environmental, and societal impacts, in hopes that it would set global precedents for similar businesses.

Cargill is one of four "trading giants" known as the ABCD group— ADM, Bunge, Cargill, and Dreyfus that controls over fifty percent of the processing capacity in soybeans in the Brazilian Cerrado, and have heavily invested in storage and ports. As the Brazilian Cerrado has been transformed into the world's "soy basket" Greenpeace, local indigenous groups and other environmental groups say that Cargill has contributed to deforestation of the Amazon forest. Greenpeace protests contributed to Cargill's port being shut down from 2007 to 2012.

In response to an ongoing 2005 lawsuit, that has caught the interest of the Supreme Court and the Trump administration, involving child slave labor in the chocolate industry in the Ivory Coast, Cargill has invested millions into programs such as the Implementation of Child Labor Monitoring and Remediation System (CLMRS) in 2019.

== Overview ==
Cargill Inc is owned by five generations of the Cargill family. The multinational corporation is a giant in agribusiness industry with 160,000 employees in 70 countries and partnership in over 125 countries in the "food, agriculture, and financial industries." It is headquartered in Minneapolis, Minnesota, and has been the largest privately owned corporation in the United States for decades. Its annual revenue in fiscal year 2019 was $113.5 billion. (Note: World Business Council for Sustainable Development (WBCSD) is a multinational company organized by their chief executive officers (CEO)s.)

Cargill is a member of Roundtable on Sustainable Palm Oil (RSPO) (2004–) and Soft Commodities Forum (SCF) (2019–) which was convened by the World Business Council for Sustainable Development (WBCSD).

Concerns have been raised about Cargill's environmental record in a number of industries and countries by the Roundtable on Sustainable Palm Oil (RSPO) and other organizations since at least the early 2000s. The RSPO said that if Cargill—the "most influential palm oil producer and trader" in the United States—would undertake "bold action ... to reduce the negative impacts of its palm oil operations", they "could establish an important precedent for agribusiness throughout the world."

Cargill has been called a "cartel" in a 2016 book entitled The Political Economy of Agricultural Booms: Managing Soybean Production in Argentina, Brazil, and Paraguay.

== Environmental damage ==
=== Cargill's palm oil operations (2004–2010) ===
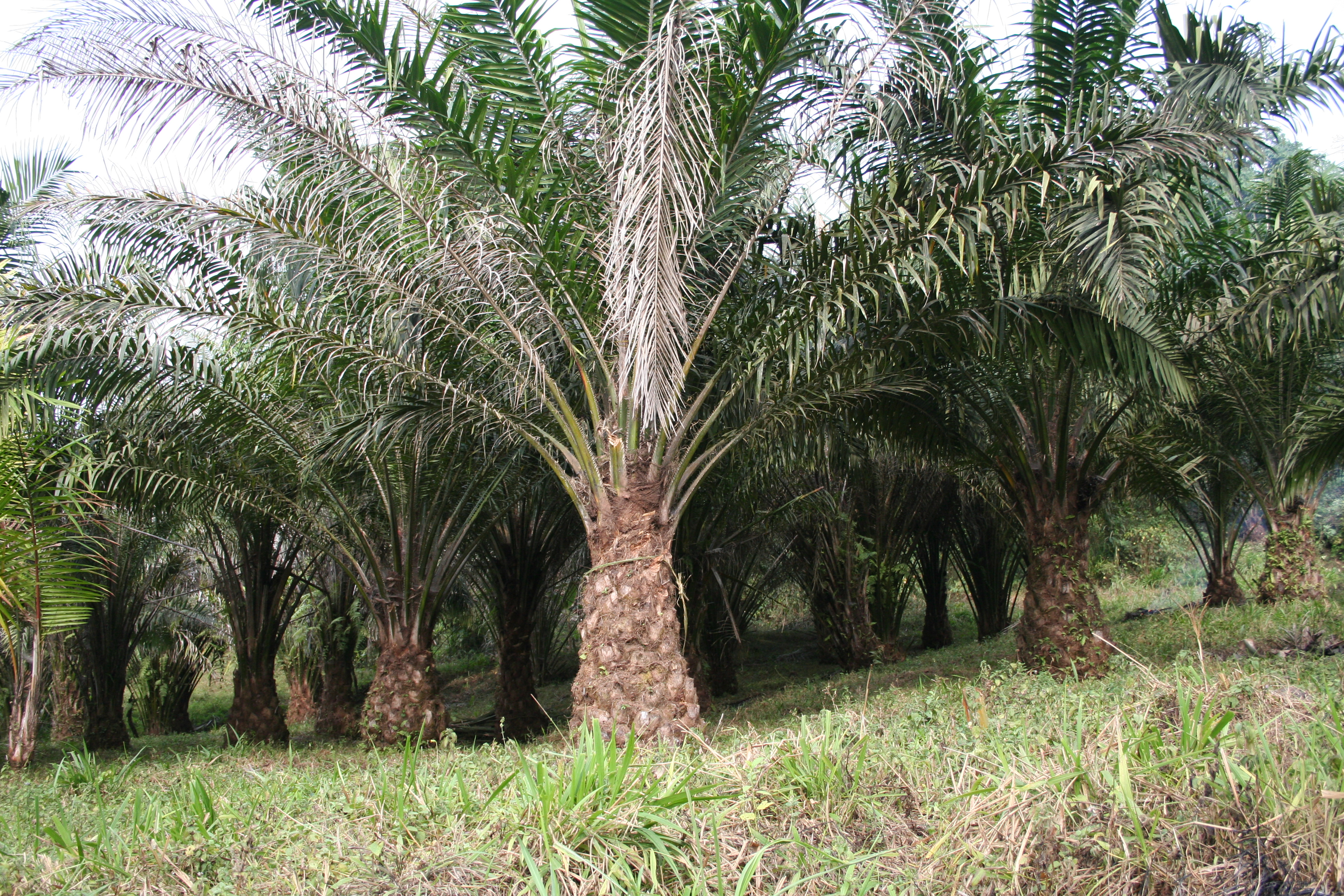
Oil palms (Elaeis guineensis)

Concerns have been raised about Cargill's palm oil operations in Indonesia and Papua New Guinea by Friends of the Earth, the United Nations Food and Agriculture Organization (FAO), Rainforest Action Network (RAN), Asian Studies Association of Australia, and the Roundtable on Sustainable Palm Oil (RSPO). Cargill has corporate social responsibility policies and industry commitments to produce palm oil sustainably.

In 2004, Cargill became a certified member of the RSPO, which sets standards for palm oil production. Certified member companies are expected to voluntarily comply with RSPO principles, criteria, and adhere to best practices. RSPO 2010 investigations of Cargill, revealed that there was a "wide gulf between Cargill's palm oil operations and its stated commitments and responsibilities under the RSPO."

According to a 2004 Friends of the Earth article, at that time, Cargill owned five oil palm plantations, through their oil palm arm CTP Holdings, in Indonesia and Papua New Guinea. In 2004, Cargill was the largest US importer of palm oil, sourcing the oil from at least 26 producers and buying roughly 11% of Indonesia's total oil palm output.

By 2006, there had been hundreds of cases of social conflict documented at Cargill's oil palm plantations by NGOs, government, and Indonesia's National Human Rights Court.

A 2006 Jakarta Post article said that Cargill purchased palm oil from many more 'worst-of-the-worst' rainforest destroyers—including Wilmar International, Sinar Mas, and Duta Palma—all of whom violate Indonesian law by burning rainforests.

A 2007 FAO report said that oil palm plantations were driving the destruction of tropical rainforests around the globe. Indonesia—which had the world's highest rate of deforestation, with, on average, 20 square miles (52 km^{2}) of rainforest destroyed everyday—was ground zero for oil palm expansion, and produced more than 45 percent of the world's palm oil. Palm oil is a globally traded commodity used in a wide range of consumer products, including packaged foods, cosmetics, and cleaning supplies, and as a feedstock for biofuels. Produced in the world's tropics on industrial monoculture plantations, oil palm has severe and widespread negative impacts on the environment and local people.

It was reported at the 2008 Asian Studies Association of Australia, that local communities had lost their ancestral forests and farmland to Cargill's oil palm plantations. These communities were not properly compensated for their lands, nor did they give their free, prior, and informed consent for the conversion of their lands to industrial monoculture.

According to the Rainforest Action Network, by 2009, 83,000 hectares of Cargill's five directly owned oil palm plantations had been carved out of lowland rainforests, causing massive deforestation. At that time, Cargill was actively clearing forest in Borneo at their PT Harapan Sawit Lestari plantation without an environmental impact assessment, which was required by Indonesian law.

The RSPO 2007 report said that at Cargill's three oil palm plantations in Papua New Guinea (PNG), formally independent farmers are being converted into de facto bonded laborers through Cargill's use of complex debt schemes and unfulfilled promises of new roads, schools, and hospitals. Covering rugged and isolated terrain, Cargill's own management had acknowledged their inability to prevent the use of child labor on their PNG plantations.

In their May 2010 report, the RSPO said that at "two undisclosed palm oil plantation operations in West Kalimantan, Indonesia, operated by Cargill, they were "actively burning and clearing rainforests, causing conflict with local communities", and "destroying peatlands."

Cargill began operating palm oil plantations in the mid-1990s in South Sumatra. By 2019, Cargill employed 6,000 women and 13,000 men in Southeast Asia. In 2018, they introduced maternity benefits to encourage women to work in what is normally considered to be man's job

=== Cargill's 2003 Santarém port and Amazon deforestation ===
By 2012, Cargill was one of a group of large multinational companies, along with ADM, Bunge, Dreyfus (referred to as the ABCD) group, that controlled over fifty percent of the processing capacity in soybeans, and had heavily invested in storage and ports.

In 2003, Cargill completed a port for processing soya in Santarém "on the northern end of highway BR-163" in the Amazon region of Brazil which reduced transportation costs. The port reduced the cost of transport and increased access to processing facilities, which dramatically increased incentives to produce more soya in the "heavily forested areas nearby". As local farmers cleared land in the rain forest for soya crops, in late 2003, Greenpeace launched a campaign to protest Cargill's new port. Although Cargill had complied with state legislation, they had failed to comply with a federal law requiring an Environmental Impact Statement. In February 2006, the federal courts in Brazil gave Cargill six months to complete an environmental assessment (EA), different from an Environmental Impact Statement (EIS). This ruling came as part of a broader popular backlash against the port. The local community had supported the port because of the promise of new jobs. Opinions changes as the jobs were not forthcoming. In July 2006, federal prosecutor Felicia Pontes Jr. suggested they were close to shutting down the port. The port was shut down in 2007 by the Brazilian Environmental Agency.

Greenpeace released a report in April 2006, criticising Cargill for its alleged role in deforestation of the Amazon. The report said that Cargill was the dominant company that exposed deforestation to the indigenous tribes, making them vulnerable for the loss of their lands. The report also said that Cargill had slave labourers working at these soya farms 16 hours a day, seven days a week.

The report traced animal feed made from Amazonian soy to European food retailers who bought chicken and other meat raised on the feed. Greenpeace took its campaign to these major food retailers and quickly won agreement from McDonald's along with UK retailers Asda, Waitrose and Marks & Spencer to stop buying meat raised on Amazonian soya. These retailers in turn put pressure on Cargill and Archer Daniels Midland, Bunge, André Maggi Group and Dreyfus to prove their soy was not grown on recently deforested land in the Amazon.

In July 2006, Cargill, in partnership with The Nature Conservancy (TNC), and other soy businesses, signed the Soy Moratorium agreement, through which they agreed to a two-year moratorium on the purchase of soybeans from newly deforested land.

In 2010 Cargill submitted an Environmental Impact Assessment (EIA) for the port and it was re-opened in 2012.

By 2015, six new ports were under consideration resulting in exponential growth. In June 2019, Cargill Inc admitted that the soy industry in Brazil would not meet the goal that soy companies had set in the 2000s, to "end deforestation" in Brazil by 2020.

By July 2019, Brazil had become the world's biggest soybean exporter. The construction of new ports, "terminals and barge fleets" on the Amazon River by the ABCD "trading giants"—ADM, Bunge, Cargill, and Dreyfus—made the soybean industry even more competitive against that of the United States.

=== Broken wastewater pipeline in Australia ===
June 2007 the Australian operation of Cargill was fined A$37,500 by the New South Wales Land and Environment Court after a waste water pipeline ruptured in January 2006 which flowed into a stormwater system and into the Bomen wetland.

=== Building on restorable wetlands ===
Cargill has triggered significant controversy with its plan to build a major new housing development of as many as 32,000 people on its privately owned salt ponds in Redwood City.

The property was originally marshland along San Francisco Bay, and became one of the first commercial salt-making locations on the Peninsula in 1901 when portions were drained and diked off from the Bay. Immediately after World War II, the former Leslie Salt Company modernized and expanded the plant site and harvested up to 300,000 tons of salt which it shipped to industries throughout the Pacific Rim. Leslie was purchased by Cargill in 1978, and has continued salt-making, although under more difficult business conditions, with the opening of a large competing salt works in Baja, which is owned by Mitsubishi and the Mexican government. In 2000, Cargill offered the property to the US Fish and Wildlife Service and the California Department of Fish and Game, but the resource agencies were unable to afford the site, although 16,500 acres were acquired from Cargill in 2003 through a combination donation/sale. The state courts later ruled that the property had been overvalued by the appraiser's unfounded assumption of its value for development or mitigation.

Subsequently, Cargill partnered with luxury-home builder DMB Associates of Scottsdale, Arizona, which has submitted a "50/50 Plan" to build 12,000 houses, 1 Million Sq. Ft of commercial space, and community facilities on about half of the 1,436 acres (2.2 mi^{2}) site, and convert the rest to wetlands, parks, lagoons, and open space on the Bayfront in Redwood City.

The San Francisco Chronicle, San Jose Mercury News and over 150 elected officials from around the Bay Area have called the San Francisco Bay salt ponds an unacceptable site for housing, and have come out against the project.

Local environmentalist group Save The Bay has actively criticized Cargill for trying to destroy bay wetlands. However, others say that campaign is false advertisement as Cargill's 50/50 plan does not call for any wetland destruction or filling of the bay, only building on their property filled with only salt ponds and salt harvesting facilities.

Residents' initial efforts to preserve the salt ponds as open space were defeated by 63% of Redwood City voters in a 2008 local referendum that sought to make development difficult by amending the city charter.

Since that time, a growing coalition of over 30 environmental, business and community groups, led by Save The Bay, has continued to fight the proposed development. They assert that the salt ponds should be restored as part of the neighboring Don Edwards San Francisco Bay National Wildlife Refuge and not used for housing, similar to the 16,500 acres Cargill sold in 2003, which now comprise the largest tidal wetland restoration project on the West Coast.

=== Cargill Phosphate company 2004 acidic wastewater spill in Tampa Bay ===
In August 2004, the Florida Department of Environmental Protection warned officials at the Cargill Phosphate company in Riverview, Florida, that their dike was not sturdy enough. Reinforcements were underway, when waves churned by Hurricane Frances broke through the dike that surrounded the retention pond, spilling 65 million gallons of acidic wastewater into Tampa Bay on September 5, 2004. A spokesperson for the Cargill Phosphate company called it one of the worst environmental disasters to strike Tampa Bay in years, a "10 on a scale of 10." Eight years after the disaster at Cargill Phosphate Company—Mosaic's Riverview Chemical Plant—Mosaic undertook initial cleanup and restoration of the mangroves and wetlands that were severely harmed by the spill. (Note: The Cargill family which had owned Mosaic, sold their majority shares in 2012.) Mosaic Fertilizer—the largest phosphate mining company in the world—was owned by the Cargill family until 2012, had six Florida sites and two in Louisiana. In 2015, the EPA had fined Mosaic about $2 billion for "improper storage and disposal of waste from the production of phosphoric and sulfuric acids, key components of fertilizers, at Mosaic's Riverview Chemical Plant, and other sites.

== Human rights abuses ==
=== Aiding and abetting slave labor (2005 in Côte d'Ivoire) ===
In July 2005, the International Labor Rights Fund filed suit against Cargill, Nestlé and Archer Daniels Midland (ADM) in Federal District Court in Los Angeles "filed by six former slaves who were kidnapped from their native Mali" into Côte d'Ivoire and forced to work twelve to fourteen hours a day with no pay, little food and sleep, and frequent beatings. The children acting as class representative plaintiffs are proceeding anonymously, as John Does, because of feared retaliation by the farm owners where they worked. In 2014, the San Francisco-based 9th U.S. Circuit Court of Appeals refused to dismiss the lawsuit filed by "former victims of child slavery." because the allegations portrayed "overseas slave labor that defendants perpetuated from headquarters in the United States." In January 2016, in Nestle Inc v. John Doe, U.S. Supreme Court, No. 15-349, the Supreme Court agreed with the lower court that the lawsuit would not be withdrawn.

In January 2020, Cargill and Nestle asked the Supreme Court to end the lawsuit against them in the case, which has "been moving up and down the federal court system since 2005". According to the Los Angeles Times, the companies are "accused of aiding and abetting slave labor by giving Ivory Coast farmers financial assistance in the expectation that cocoa prices would stay low. The suit alleges the companies were fully aware that child slavery was being used." The Supreme Court has asked the Trump administration for advice as the Court shows "interest in giving companies a broader shield from lawsuits by victims of overseas atrocities."

According to a 2019 article in The Washington Post, Cargill—described as a "large commodity trader"—is one of the "leading cocoa suppliers for the chocolate industry". Middle men or "pisteurs" collect bags of cocoa that are trucked to Cargill's facility in Abidjan, Côte d'Ivoire. The article, which focused on child labor, said that even though "Mars, Nestlé and Hershey" had pledged in the early 2000s, to "stop using cocoa harvested by children", most chocolate today continues to be harvested using child labor. In September 2018, Cargill was seeking to expand its storage warehouse space for cocoa in Abidjan by 100,000 square meters. In December 2019, Cargill announced investments of $113 million in cocoa processing facilities in Ivory Coast and Ghana. Cargill, which has had operations in the Ivory Coast since 1997 and employs 490 people there, announced in December 2019 that they would be investing $7.7 million over three years in programs in the Ivory Coast, such as the Implementation of Child Labor Monitoring and Remediation System (CLMRS).

=== Uzbek cotton ===
Cargill operates in Uzbekistan despite admissions made by two of its representatives on separate occasions that the company is concerned about the possible use of child labor in the production of its crops. Their concerns have been public since 2005; however, Cargill has not yet taken action to investigate or correct any possible labor violations existent in their Uzbek operations.

The Environmental Justice Foundation named Cargill as a major buyer of Uzbek cotton, which is produced widely using uncompensated workers and is implicated in human rights abuses. Cargill claims to have no knowledge of misconduct in either case.

=== Dayton, Virginia, employees ===
In February 2018, several employees of Cargill's Dayton, Virginia, plan protested over poor health benefits and bad working conditions, and protesting over the company allegedly firing employees that organized to create a union. The protests lead to nine individuals being arrested for trespassing on the plant's property in protest.

== Contamination ==
=== Mercury poisoning in Iraq ===
In 1970, Cargill sold 63,000 tons of seed grain to Basra, Iraq. Although banned in many Western countries, Cargill agreed to treat the seed grain with methylmercury. The shipment was sprayed red to mark its danger and indicate that it was not intended for human or animal consumption but only for use in agriculture. Once it arrived in Iraq in early October, however, the surplus seed was given away by the government, and a number of recipients used it as food, since the only printed warnings about the poison were written in English and Spanish, as warnings to American dock workers. This led to the deaths of 93 people.

=== 2007 beef recall (USA) ===
In October 2007 Cargill announced the recall of nearly 850 000 frozen beef patties produced at its packing plant in Butler, Wisconsin. The patties, processed between the August 9, 2007, and August 17, 2007, were suspected of being contaminated with E. coli. The beef was sold mainly at Walmart and Sam's Club stores.

=== Cargill Australia exports ===
In March 2009, Cargill Australia (Wagga) had its export licence, to export meat to Japan and the United States, placed on temporary suspension by the Australian Quarantine and Inspection Service (AQIS) after E. coli was detected in Cargill's export containers from its Wagga Wagga plant. In late April 2009, AQIS lifted Cargill Australia's suspension on its export licence.

== Price-fixing allegations ==
In 2021, JBS, National Beef, Cargill, and Tyson were sued by grocers and wholesalers, which accused the four companies of working together to drive up the price of beef. In 2024, McDonald's Corporation sued Cargill and the same three other companies, along with their subsidiaries, for alleged price fixing.

== External resources ==
- Cargill's Legacy of Destruction palm oil video
- Cargill's Legacy of Destruction: A case study of a Cargill owned palm oil plantation in Indonesia
- Commodity Colonialism: A case study of Cargill's oil palm operations in Papua New Guinea
- Virtual Tour of the Saltworks Proposed Development in Redwood City, CA Youtube Channel
