= Mount Eden (disambiguation) =

Mount Eden is a suburb in Auckland, New Zealand

Mount Eden, Mt. Eden or Mt Eden may also refer to:

== Places ==
- Maungawhau / Mount Eden, a volcano in Auckland, New Zealand
- Mount Eden, California, Hayward, California, United States
- Mount Eden Landing, former name of Eden Landing, California
- Mount Eden, Bronx, a neighborhood in the Bronx section of New York City

== Transport ==
- Mt Eden Train Station, Auckland, New Zealand
- Mount Eden Avenue (IRT Jerome Avenue Line), New York City subway

== Other uses ==
- Mt. Eden High School, Hayward, California
- Mount Eden Prisons, in Auckland, New Zealand
- Mt Eden (band), a duo specializing in producing dubstep music from New Zealand
