= San Francisco Bay National Wildlife Refuge Complex =

San Francisco Bay National Wildlife Refuge Complex is a National Wildlife Refuge complex in the state of California, comprising seven separate wildlife refuges in and around San Francisco Bay. They are administered by the U.S. Fish and Wildlife Service. The complex is also responsible for the Common Murre Restoration Project, designed to protect seabird life on the California central coast, including the Common Murre. The project hopes to establish a colony of murres at Devil's Slide Rock near Pacifica.

== Refuges within the complex ==
- Antioch Dunes National Wildlife Refuge
- Don Edwards San Francisco Bay National Wildlife Refuge
- Ellicott Slough National Wildlife Refuge
- Farallon National Wildlife Refuge
- Marin Islands National Wildlife Refuge
- Salinas River National Wildlife Refuge
- San Pablo Bay National Wildlife Refuge
