= Mount Eden, California =

Unincorporated community in California, U.S.

Coordinates: 37°38′10″N 122°06′00″W

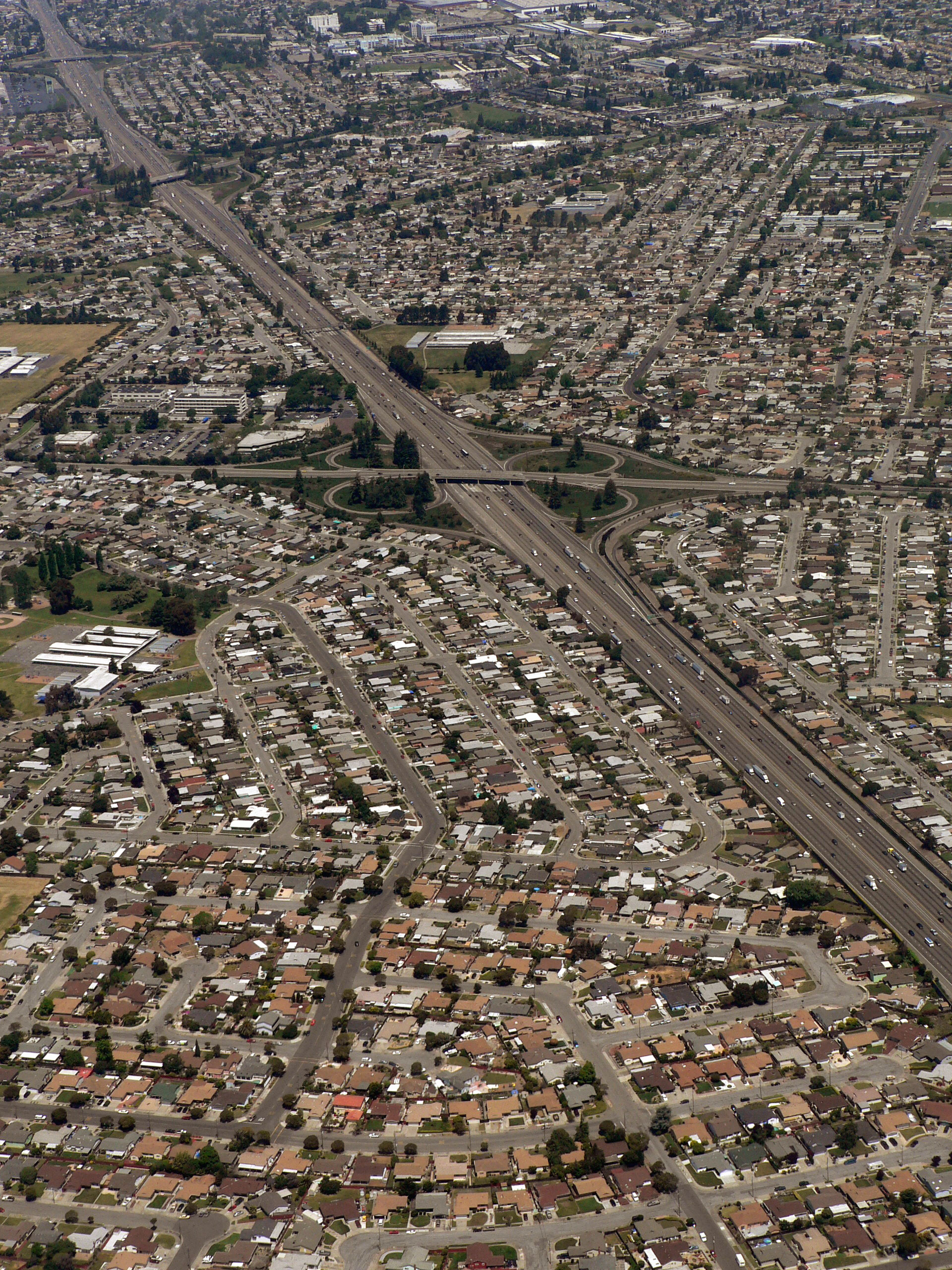
historic location of Mt. Eden, currently the intersection of Interstate 880 (vertical freeway) and State Route 92 (second overpass from top of photo)

Mt. Eden was an unincorporated agricultural district in Eden Township, Alameda County, California, United States. It was annexed by the City of Hayward. It lies at an elevation of 43 feet (13 m).

Mt. Eden was founded in 1850 by a group of farmers from Mount Eden, Kentucky, drawn to California by the Gold Rush. The party disbanded upon reaching the San Francisco Bay, but a few settled at a road crossing where they nailed a sign "Mt. Eden" to two trees, and the name stuck. A post office opened in 1860 and was in continuous operation until 1953.

== Background ==
A thriving economic community developed around the site, ranging from the shores of San Francisco Bay eastward to Telegraph Road (now Hesperian Boulevard). Mt. Eden included many farms as well as trans-bay shipping and salt-harvesting industries. The population of Mt. Eden grew with significant immigration from northern Germany and Denmark. The salt companies gradually consolidated, and after the demise of the Oliver Salt Company in 1931 only the Leslie Salt Company remained. Trans-bay shipping suffered from increasing competition from roads and railroads.

The historic center of Mt. Eden, now a freeway interchange, was around Telegraph Road, now Hesperian Boulevard, between Depot Road and Jackson Street. Most of Mt. Eden was annexed by the City of Hayward in the late 1950s. The Mt. Eden post office, however, continued to be used until 1984, when it was decommissioned by the U. S. Postal Service. Between 2003 and 2009 several unincorporated "islands", remaining from the earlier annexation, became part of the City of Hayward.

The name "Mt. Eden" survives in the names of some local institutions: Mt. Eden High School, Mt. Eden Cemetery, Mt. Eden Park, and Mt. Eden Mansion.

== See also ==
- Eden Landing, California
- Eden Landing Ecological Reserve
