= San Francisco Bay Salt Ponds =

Salt evaporation ponds in the San Francisco Bay, California

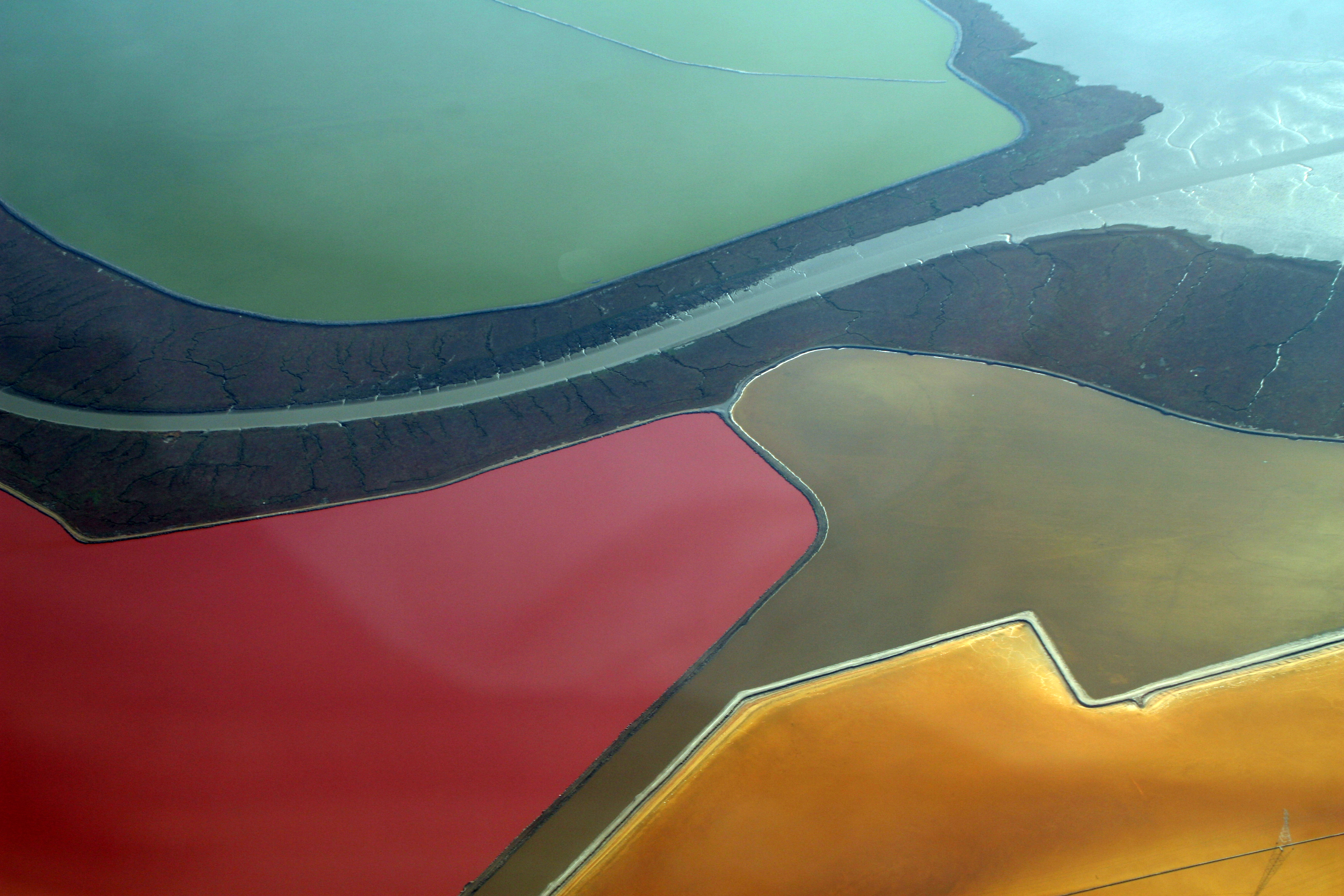
- Bird's-eye view of the multi-colored ponds

- Location in California
- 37.496887°N 122.114525°W
- Location: San Francisco Bay

The San Francisco Bay Salt Ponds are a roughly 16,500-acre (6,700 ha) part of the San Francisco Bay that have been used as salt evaporation ponds since the California Gold Rush era. Most of the ponds were once wetlands in the cities of Redwood City, Newark, and Hayward, and other parts of the bay.

Salt production goes back to when the Ohlone were the only people in the area. After the large influx of people to the area in the 1850s, industrial production began. At first, production was predominantly small family operations, but over time, these were replaced by companies such as the Oliver Salt Company in Mount Eden and Leslie Salt in Newark. Eventually, Cargill bought out the companies to become the dominant producer in the area. Since 2003, a move has arisen to close the ponds and return the area to its natural state. This process may take as long as 30 years.

== Geography and fauna ==
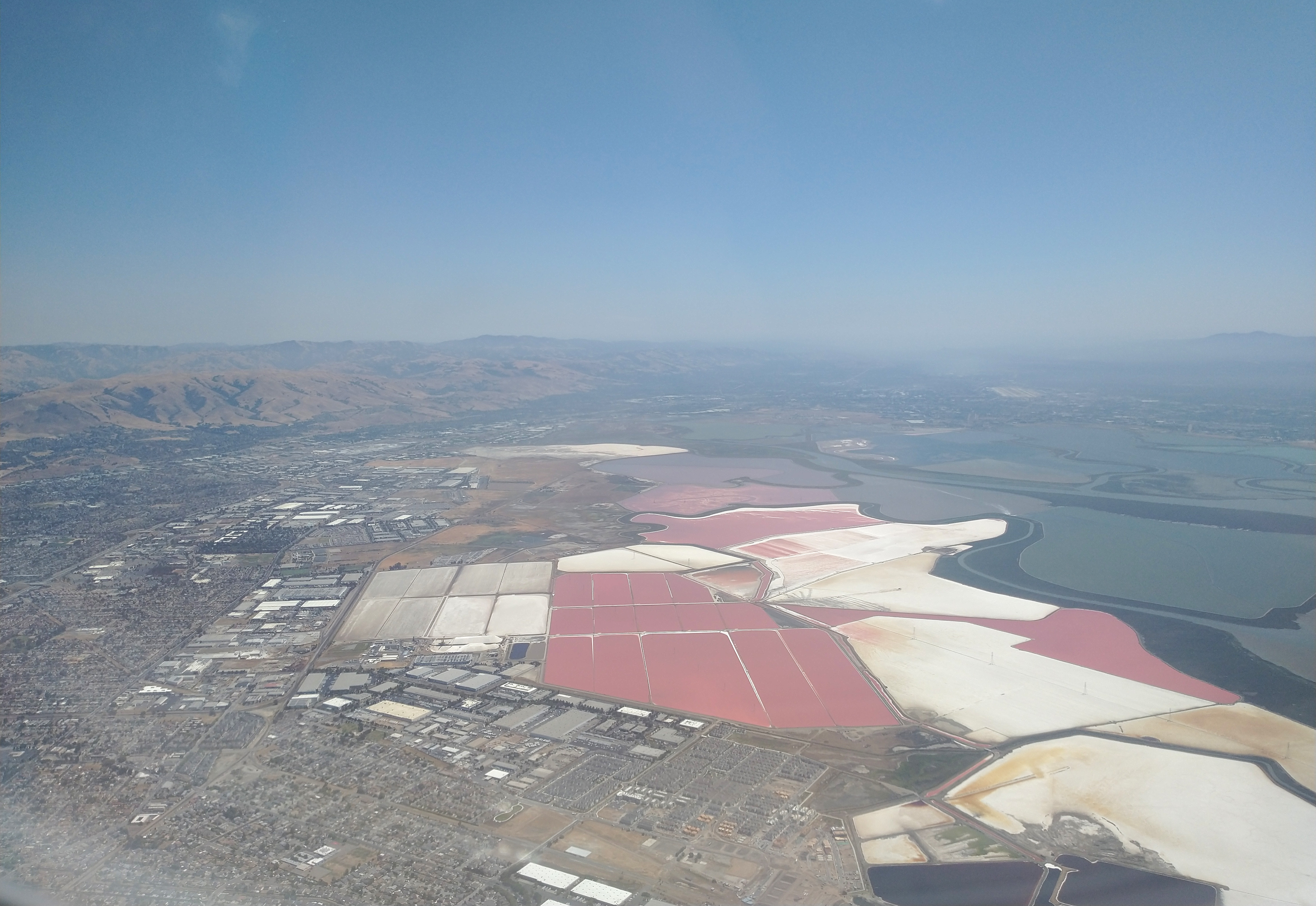
Salt ponds in Newark, California, in 2021

On the West Coast, the San Francisco Bay is one of two areas with the natural conditions from the sun and wind needed to allow for salt extraction from sea salt to be a commercially viable operation.

The ponds are noted for their vivid colors, ranging from magenta to blue-green, that are especially visible from the air. The colors come from the brine shrimp and microorganisms that thrive in the different salinity levels in the ponds. In particular, Synechococcus species, halobacteria, and Dunaliella species affect the color of salt ponds.

Despite primarily being a man-made environment, the San Francisco Bay Salt Ponds have become a core ecosystem for fish, waterbirds, and other organisms. The San Francisco Bay Salt Ponds supports over 1 million waterbirds through the year, hosting over 75 species, and peaking at 200,000 birds in a single salt pond during the winter and spring migration season. Some of the most common waterbird species in the salt ponds include the canvasback (Aythya valisineria), ruddy duck (Oxyura jamaicensis), and the snowy plover (Anarhynchus nivosus). The ponds are part of the Pacific Flyway migratory route and primarily serve as a wintering and stop-over site for migratory birds such as ducks, gulls, and grebes. Some of the most common behaviors exhibited by these birds in the ponds is foraging and roosting.

Upstream water sources such as the Guadalupe River, Almaden Reservoir, and Guadalupe Reservoir introduce naturally present mercury from sediments into the salt ponds. Organisms that birds prey on in the salt pond, such as brine flies and fish have been detected to have high levels of mercury. These cause birds in the salt pond to experience high levels of mercury exposure: Forster's terns (Sterna forsteri) that breed in the salt ponds have the highest average blood mercury content of birds that have been observed in the western United States. Mercury exposure leads to health risks for the organisms in the salt pond: 79% of Forster's terns eggs in the salt pond are at risk of birth defects.

== History ==
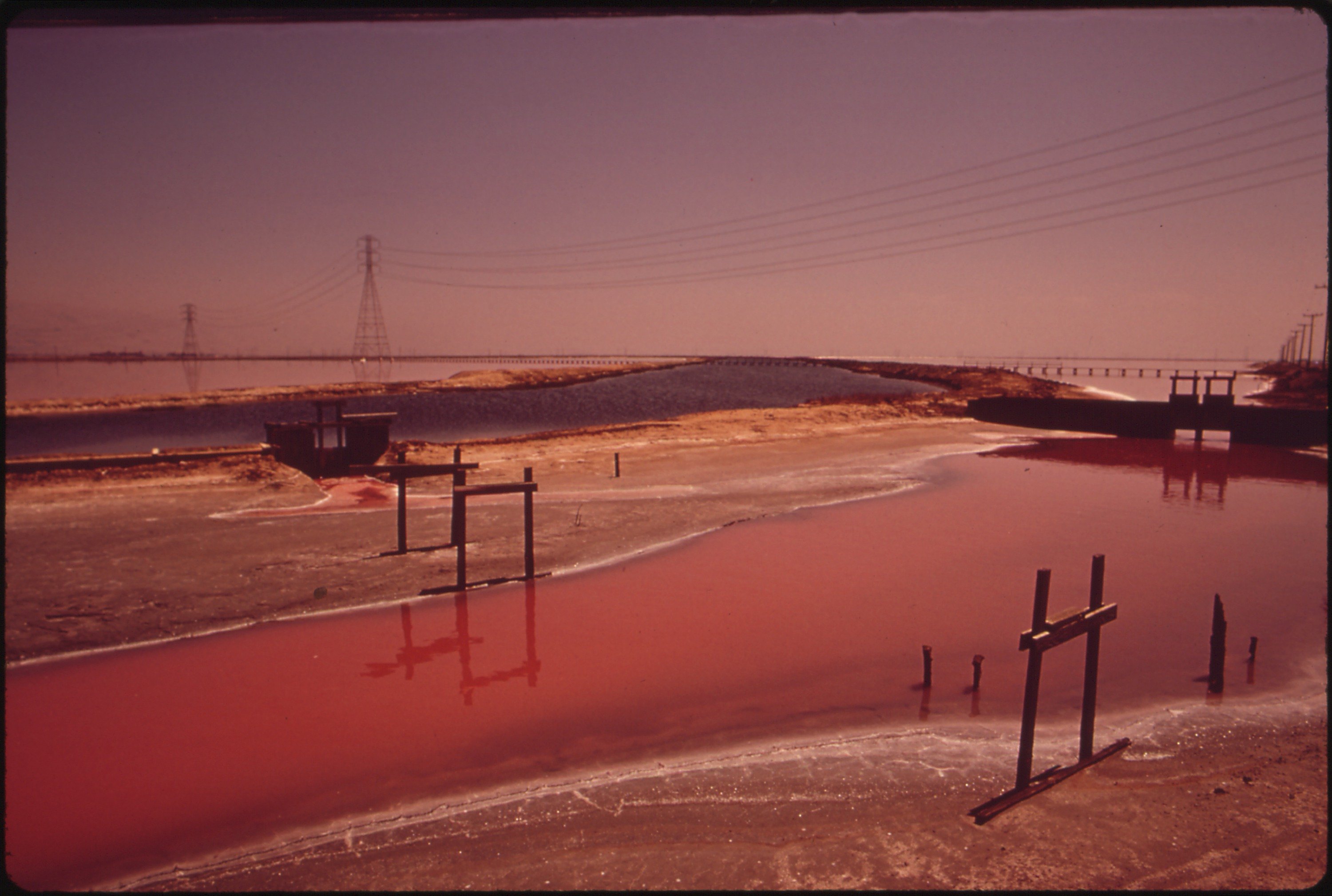
Leslie Salt ponds, 1972

The Ohlone Indians made salt from the bay by evaporating bay water in naturally occurring tide pools. At the time of the Gold Rush, salt was an important part of food preservation and was used in many industries. The favorable conditions and the immediate need sparked the explosion in salt production.

At the time, the marshlands were seen as unproductive land that could be developed for better uses. Eventually this led to 80% of the original marshes developed for other uses. Over time, many of the smaller producers sold their land and producing rights to the Oliver Salt Company, which would eventually replace the Leslie Salt Company in Newark. In 1978, Cargill purchased Leslie to become the dominant landholder and holder of salt-production rights in the area.

In 2003, Cargill sold the bulk of its salt ponds to the California Coastal Conservancy, the United States Fish and Wildlife Service, and private foundations with the goal of restoring the ponds to wetlands. This effort is known as the South Bay Salt Pond Restoration Project.

Not all the salt ponds are being restored. Cargill has proposed development of the ponds into housing in Redwood City. However, this project has prompted criticism.

== South Bay Salt Pond Restoration Project ==
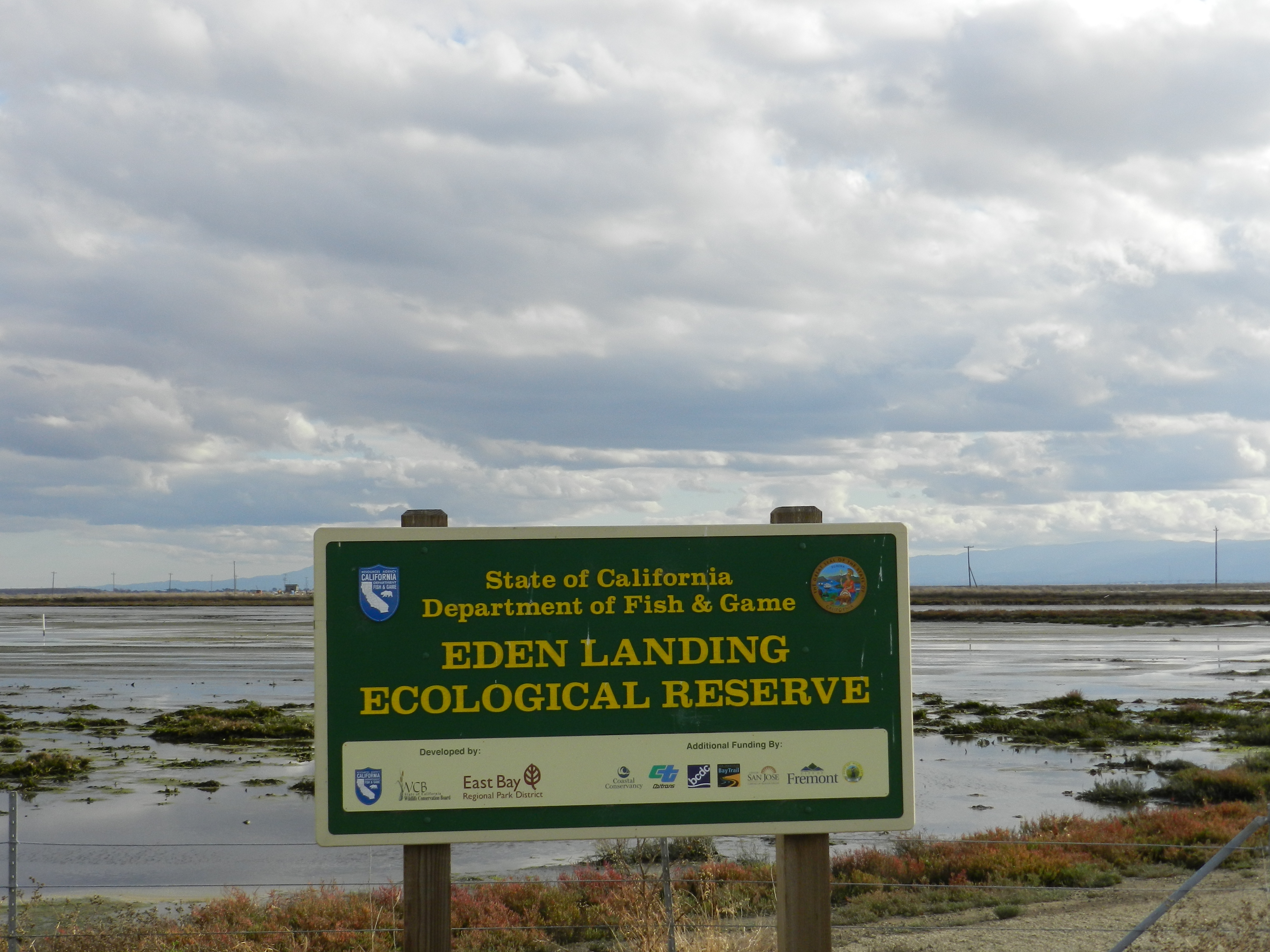
Eden Landing Ecological Reserve San Francisco Bay Area

The project is being headed by the state of California and the federal government to restore 15,100 acres (61 km^{2}) of Cargill's former salt ponds in San Francisco Bay. In October 2000, Cargill proposed to consolidate its operations and sell lands and salt production rights on 61% of its South Bay Operation area. Negotiations were headed by Senator Dianne Feinstein and a framework agreement was signed in May 2002 by the conservancy, the California Resources Agency, the Wildlife Conservation Board, the California Department of Fish and Game, United States Fish and Wildlife Service, Cargill and Senator Feinstein. California approved purchase of the property on February 11, 2003. The land is currently managed and owned by the US Fish and Wildlife Services and the Department of Fish and Game.

The goal of the South Bay Salt Pond Restoration Project is to restore 90% of the former salt ponds to natural wetlands. The Native Plant Nursery at Don Edwards San Francisco Bay National Wildlife Refuge is providing plants to the restoration project. The SBSPRP (South Bay Salt Pond Restoration Project), with over 15,000 acres and a 50-year plan, is the largest wetlands restoration project on the West Coast and provides the benefits of wetland restoration, including flood control, pollution reduction, habitat expansion for wildlife, and public access and recreation for people.

The South Bay Salt Pond Restoration Project is integrating restoration with flood management, while also providing for public access and wildlife-oriented recreation and education opportunities. Restored tidal marshes will provide critical habitat for the endangered California clapper rail and the salt marsh harvest mouse.

The restoration project has significantly decreased the salinity of ponds. Previously, the environment supported birds who foraged at salinity levels above 109 parts per thousand but now primarily supports birds that forage at salinity levels less than 33 parts per thousand. The addition of islands has supported foraging and roosting behaviors for many waterbirds. Compared to salt ponds, ponds that have been restored into wetlands have seen higher levels of small & medium shorebirds, waders, piscivores, terns, northern shovelers, ruddy ducks, and American avocets. However, since birds such as gulls and eared grebes are specialists in hypersaline environments, it was observed that they are seen significantly less in restored ponds.

Large marsh areas will also provide extensive channel systems which are to provide habitat for aquatic life and harbor seals. Flood management will also be integrated to protect local communities. Restoration will also offer many opportunities for public use, including trails for hiking and biking, hunting, bird watching, environmental education, and other recreational opportunities.

Eden Landing Ecological Reserve is part of the area being restored. The Hewlett Foundation has funded restoration of the Bay Area Salt Ponds.

== See also ==
- List of California Department of Fish and Game protected areas
- Eden Landing, California
