= Zulu Clements =

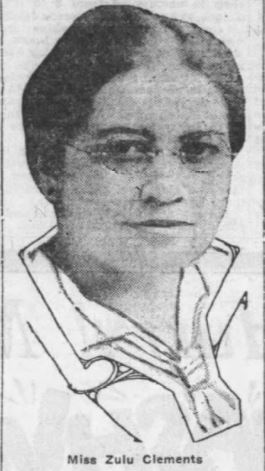
Zulu Clements

Zulu Clements (1 August 1876 – 14 December 1943) was the president of the California Federation of Business & Professional Women's Clubs. She was the traffic manager for the Leslie Salt Co, and touted as "Woman Salt Baron".

== Early life ==
Zulu Clements born in Chicago, Illinois, on August 1, 1876, the daughter of Charles R. Clements and Anna M. Cadow.

== Career ==
Clements was the Traffic Manager for the Leslie-California Salt Co, the largest salt company in the United States of the time. She was known among the San Francisco women as the dollar sign: no matter how much money was needed or for what purpose, Clements produced it from some source.

She was the editor of the Western Women's Club News, the monthly bulletin of the Western Women's Club. She was active in club affairs. She was the president of the California Federation of the national Business & Professional Women's Clubs organization. She was Director, Treasurer and First-Vice President of the San Francisco Business & Professional Women's Club. She was the editor of "The Business Woman and Business Women's News".

She was a member of the Women's Traffic Club and the East Bay Country Club.

== Personal life ==
A former resident of Chicago, Zulu Clements moved to California in 1910 and lived at 609 Sutter Street, San Francisco, California.

She died on December 14, 1943, and is buried at Cypress Lawn Memorial Park, Colma.
