= Edendale, California =

Edendale, California may refer to:

- Edendale, Los Angeles, California
- Edendale, former name of Mount Eden, California
