= Edendale =

Edendale may refer to:

- Edendale, former name of Eden Landing, California
- Edendale, Los Angeles, California, historical district in Los Angeles
- Edendale, Louisiana, a fictional town which is the setting of the U.S. TV series Star-Crossed
- Edendale, New Zealand, town in the Southland region
- Edendale, South Africa, near Pietermaritzburg
- Edendale (album) 2009 album by Norwegian rock band BigBang
