= Oliver Salt Company =

Former saltworks in California

Oliver Salt Company was a saltworks located on the San Francisco Bay adjacent to Hayward, California, which produced salt by evaporation from the San Francisco Bay Area. The remains of their facilities are within Eden Landing Ecological Reserve.

== See also ==
- Don Edwards San Francisco Bay National Wildlife Refuge
- Leslie Salt
