= Hayward Shoreline Interpretive Center =

Nature center in California, U.S.

- 25th anniversary logo
- Formation: 1986
- Type: Nature center
- Purpose: Environmental education
- Location: Hayward, California
- Region served: San Francisco Bay Area
- Website: http://www.haywardrec.org/hayshore.html
- Remarks: Open Fridays, Saturdays and Sundays from 10am-5pm; open weekdays for school programs

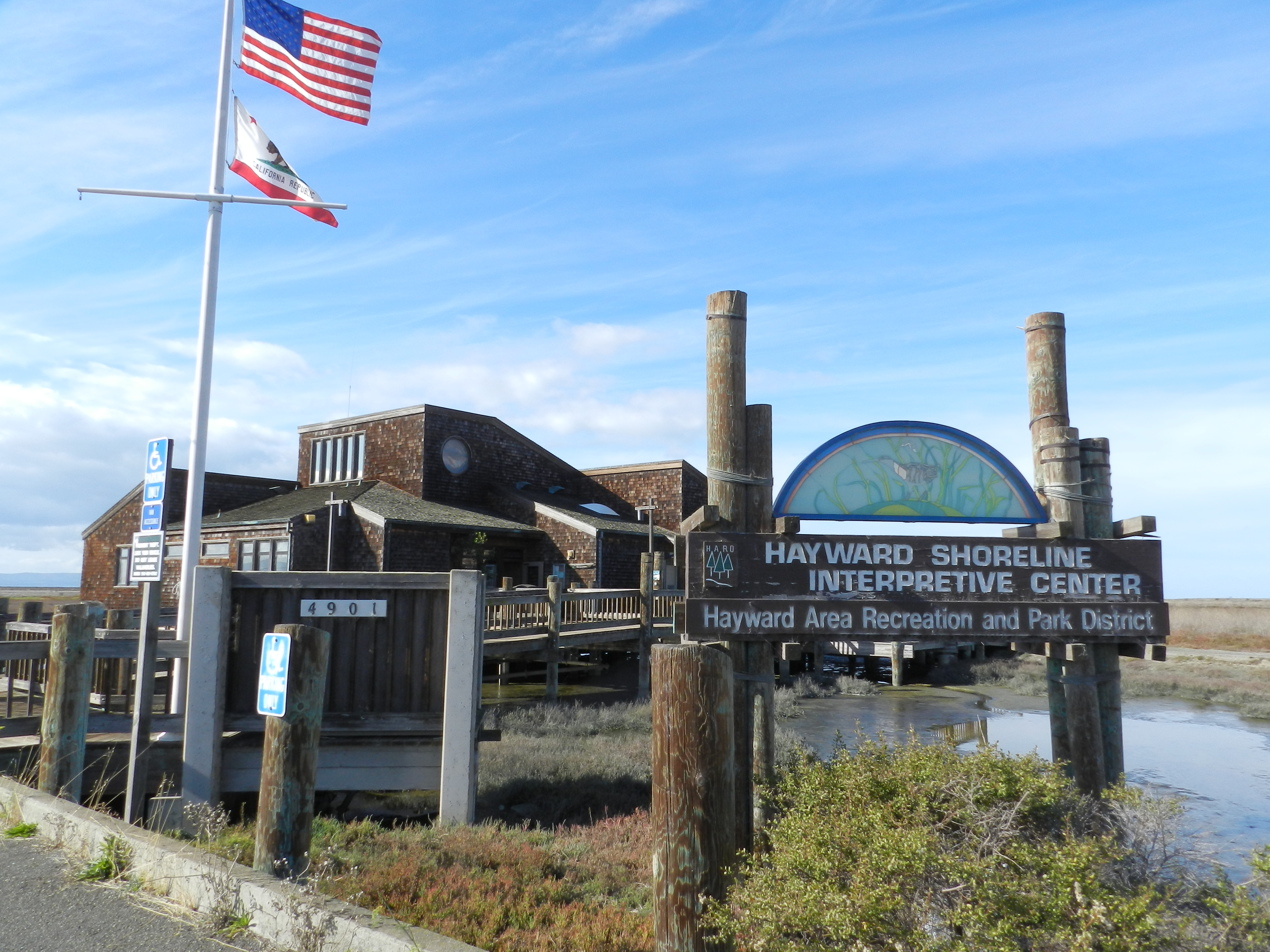
Hayward Shoreline Interpretive Center

The Hayward Shoreline Interpretive Center is a natural history and ecology interpretive nature center located in Hayward, California. It is directly adjacent to the north side of Highway 92 as it approaches the San Mateo–Hayward Bridge, and is accessed from the highway by the last offramp in the westbound direction before the bridge toll gates. The Center was dedicated in 1986, and is operated by the Hayward Area Recreation and Park District.

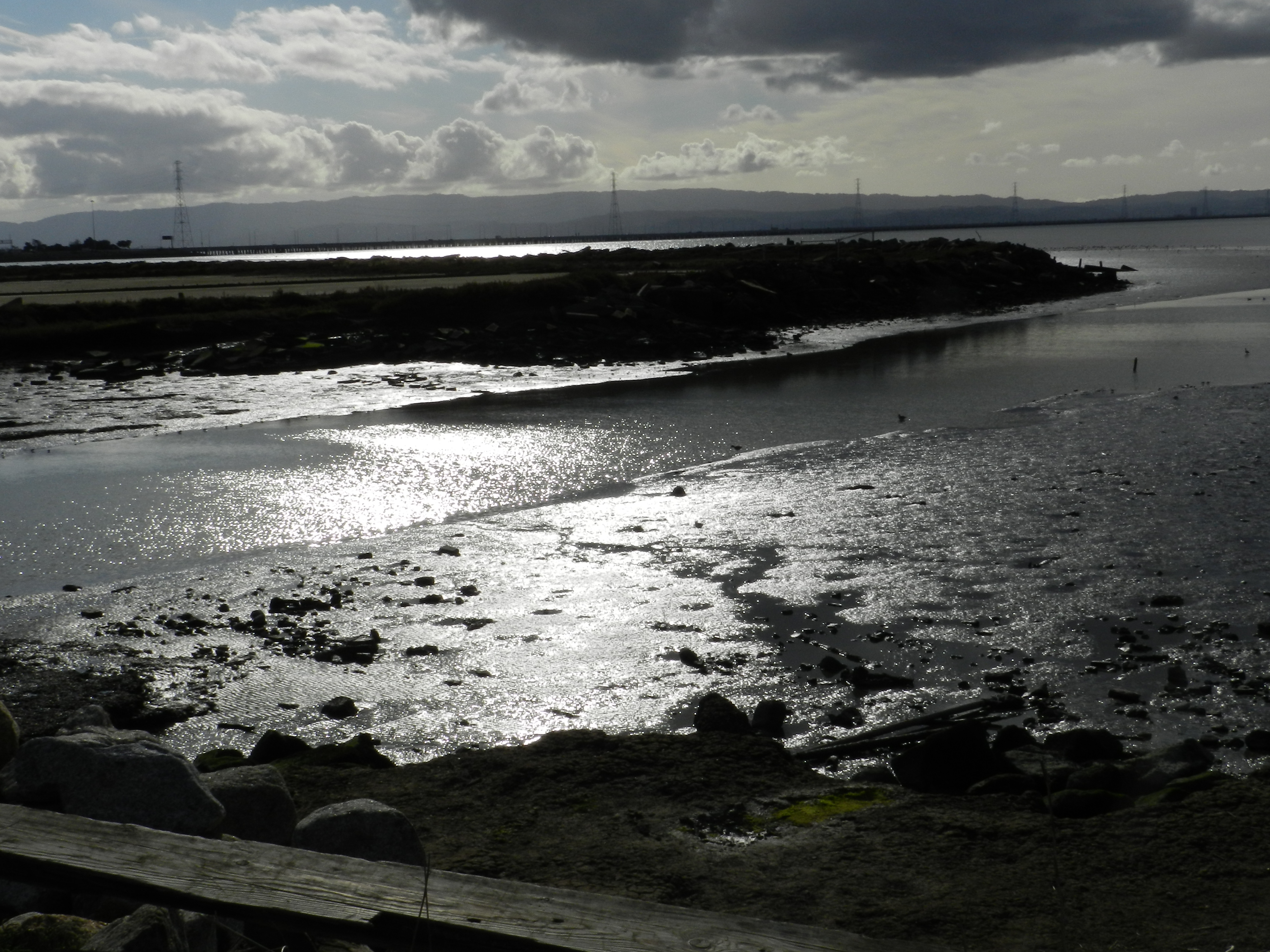
Tidal flat, afternoon, with power lines paralleling Highway 92 on the approach to the bridge

== Activities ==
The Center focuses on San Francisco Bay wetland and shoreline ecosystems, and is itself located next to restored wetlands formerly used as salt ponds. The Center operates primarily as a resource center for local schools' educational field trips. It is open to the public on weekends. The center has a small permanent exhibit of native, aquatic life, and rotating exhibits of other related subjects. It is an access point to the San Francisco Bay Trail. Binoculars are on loan for birdwatching. On the other side of Highway 92 is Eden Landing Ecological Reserve, operated by the California Department of Fish and Wildlife.

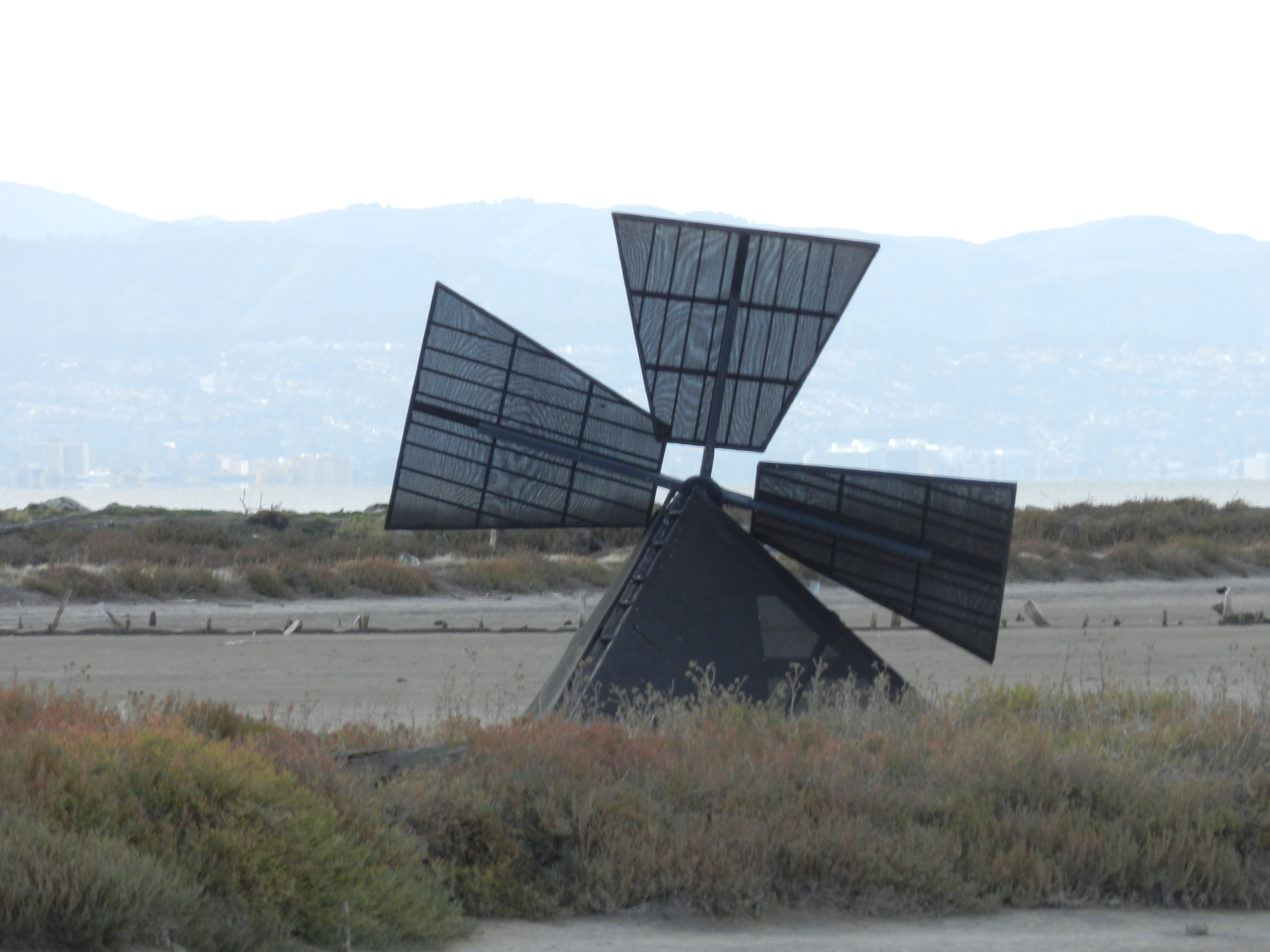
Wind powered Archimedes' screw along the San Francisco Bay Trail, adjacent to the center
