= Eden Landing Ecological Reserve =

Nature reserve in Hayward and Union City, California

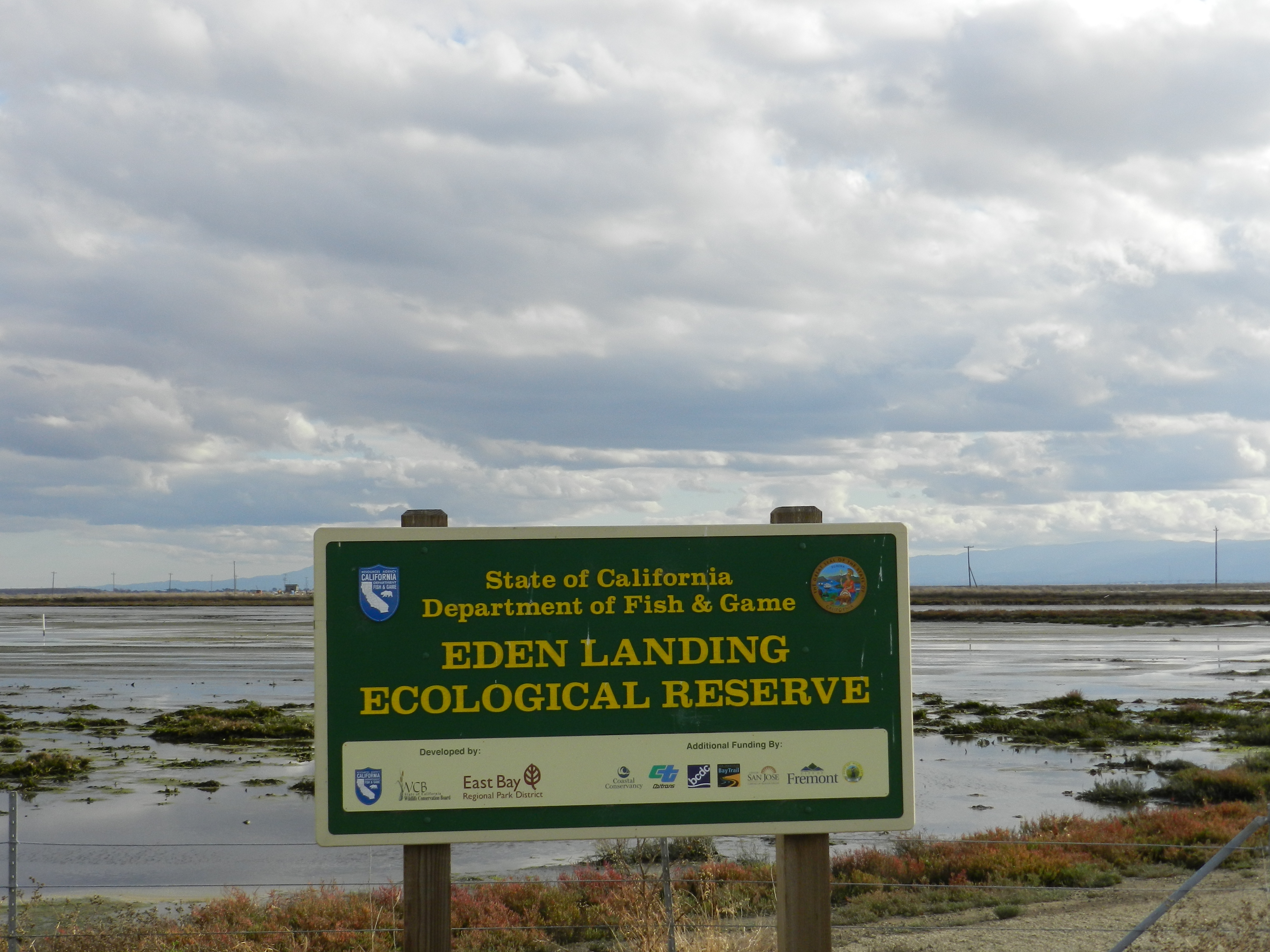
Eden Landing Ecological Reserve San Francisco Bay Area

Eden Landing Ecological Reserve is a nature reserve in Hayward and Union City, California, on the eastern shore of San Francisco Bay. The reserve is managed by the California Department of Fish and Game and includes 5,040 acres (2,040 ha) of former industrial salt ponds now used as a low salinity waterbird habitat.

== Background ==
The reserve lies between the Hayward Regional Shoreline and Alameda Creek Regional Trail to the north and adjacent to Don Edwards National Wildlife Refuge and Coyote Hills Regional Park to the south and is south and adjacent to the San Mateo–Hayward Bridge, across which lies the Hayward Shoreline Interpretive Center. Some waterfowl hunting is periodically permitted. The remains of the Oliver Salt Company are located in the reserve.

This is part of the organization's South Bay Salt Pond Restoration Project, which is the largest salt pond restoration project on the west coast of the United States. To date, over 1,000 acres of marsh have been restored, many of the former salt ponds have been enhanced for wildlife, and new trails and a kayak launch were opened to the public in April 2016. The Bay Area environmental organization Save the Bay is also working on the site to plant native vegetation along the edges of the salt marshes.

== See also ==
- List of California Department of Fish and Game protected areas
- Eden Landing, local former community from which its name is derived
