= Mt. Eden Cemetery =

Cemetery in Hayward, Alameda County, California, US

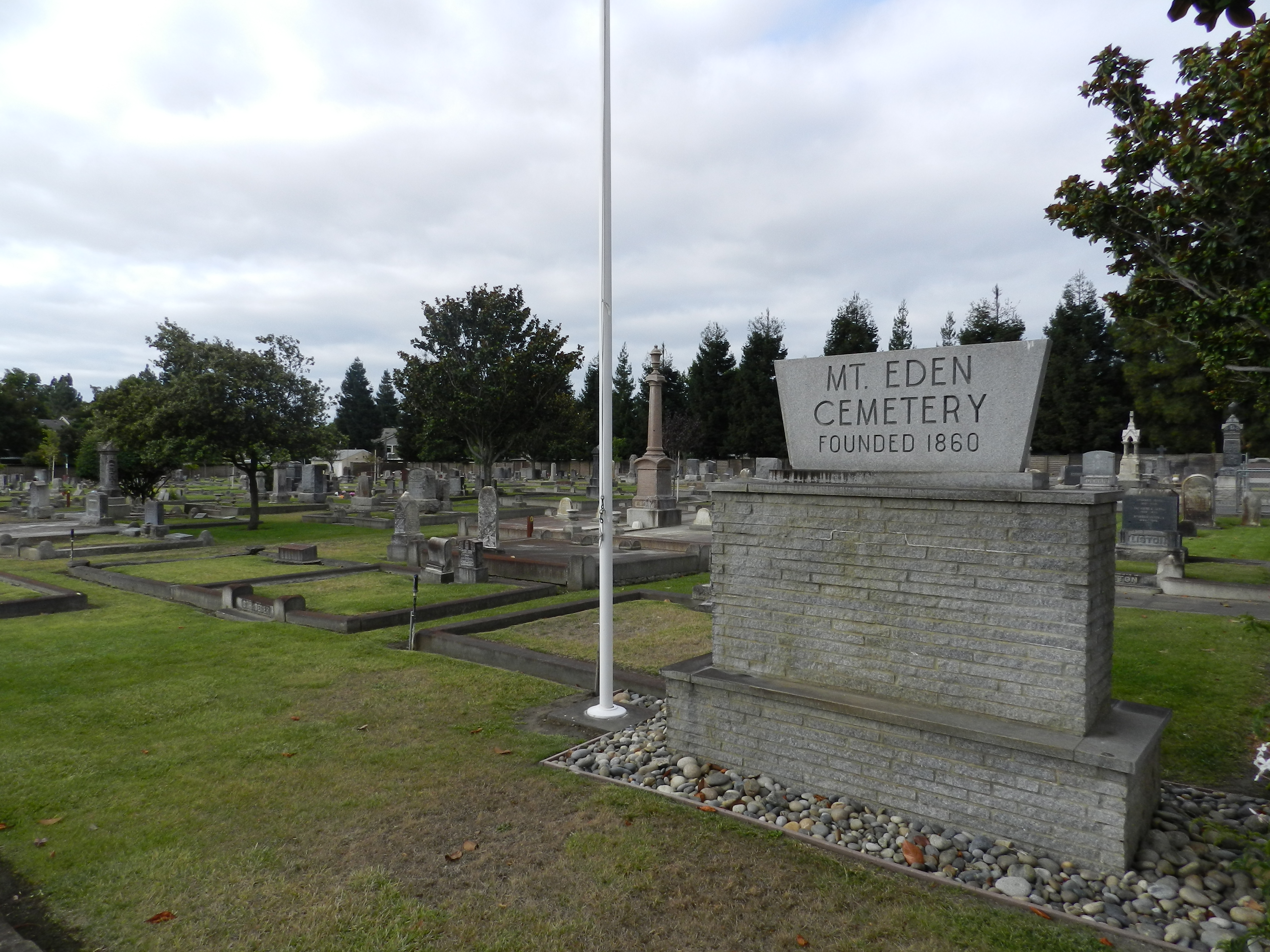

Details
- Established: 1860
- Location: 2440 Depot Road, Hayward, Alameda County, California
- Country: United States
- Coordinates: 37°38′19″N 122°06′41″W
- No. of graves: >3,000
- Website: Official website
- Find a Grave: Mt. Eden Cemetery

Mt. Eden Cemetery is a cemetery in Hayward, California, in the area formerly called "Mt. Eden". The site was first established in 1860 as a pioneer cemetery. It is still in use. As of 2005, there were over 2,800 records (gravesites).
