= Coyote Hills Regional Park =

Park in Fremont, California, US

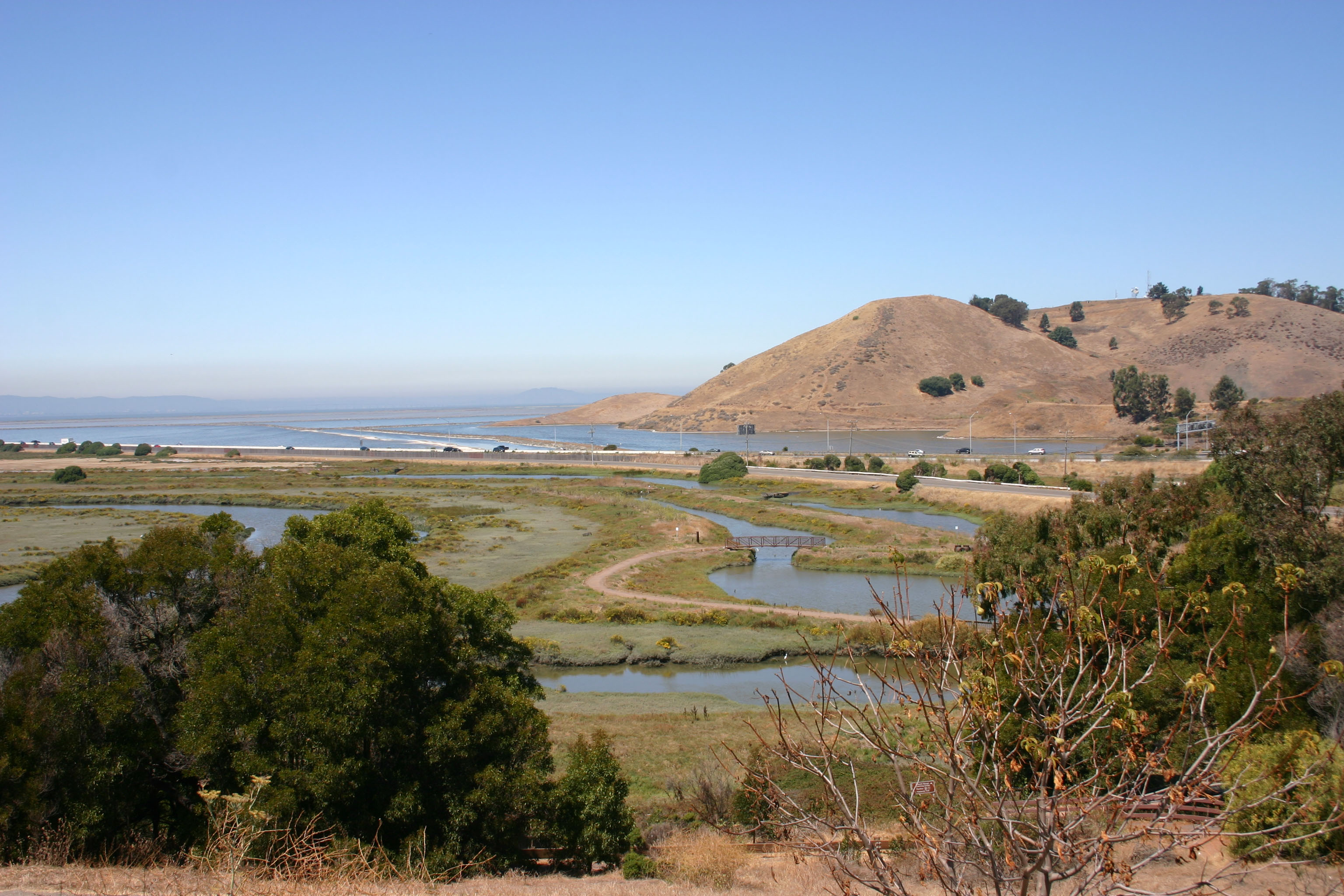
- View of Coyote Hills from the south, across a salt marsh

- Location within San Francisco Bay Area Location within California Location within the United States
- Interactive map of Coyote Hills Regional Park
- Location: Fremont, California, US
- Coordinates: 37.554103°N 122.079963°W
- Area: 978-acre (396 ha)
- Created: 1967
- Operator: East Bay Regional Park District

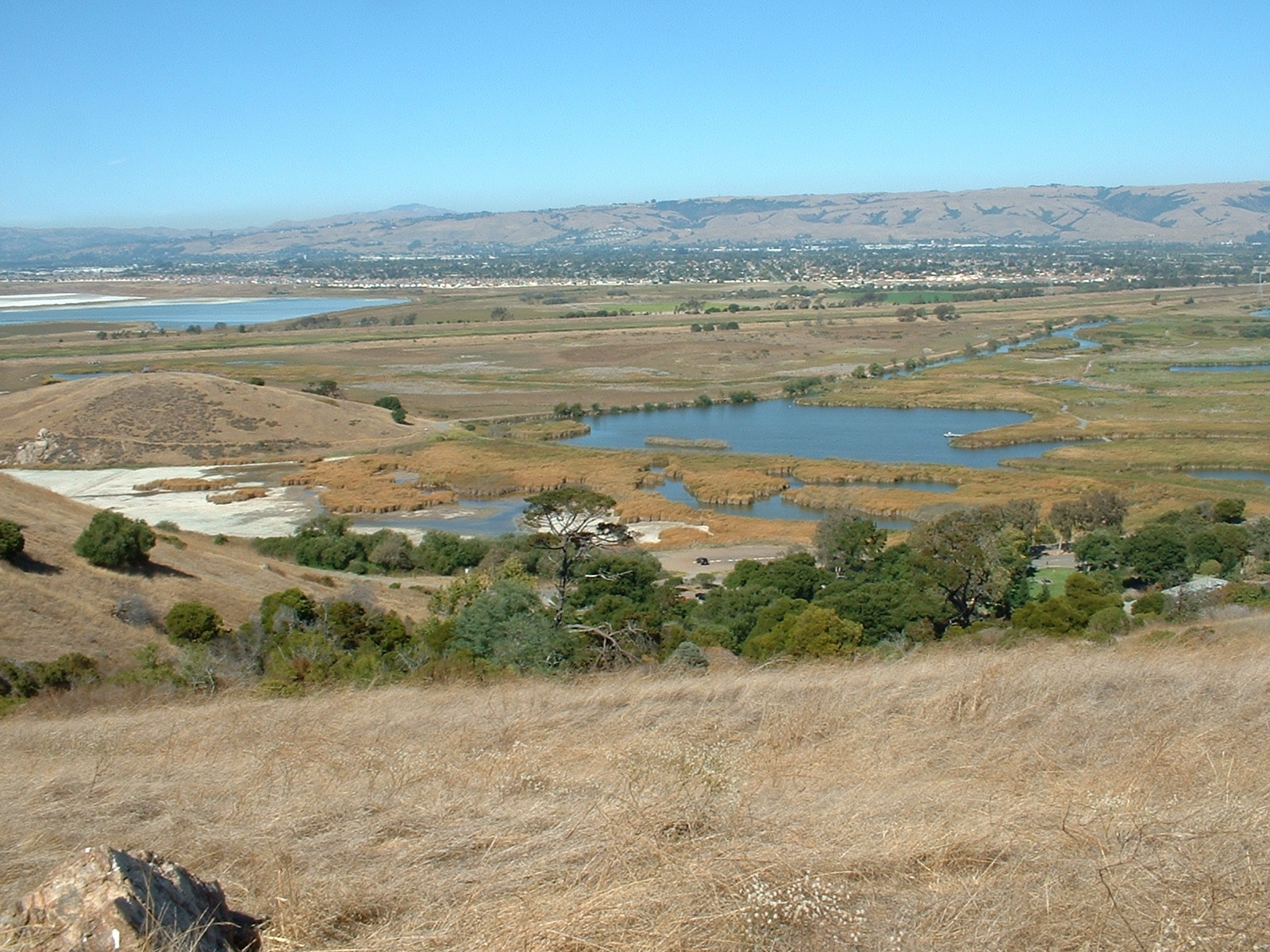
View across wetlands of the Coyote Hills park from the hills

Coyote Hills Regional Park is a regional park encompassing nearly 978 acres of land and administered by the East Bay Regional Park District. The park, which was dedicated to public use in 1967, is located in Fremont, California, US, on the southeast shore of the San Francisco Bay. The Coyote Hills themselves are a small range of hills at the edge of the bay; though not reaching any great height, they afford views of the bay, three of the trans-bay bridges (Dumbarton Bridge, San Mateo Bridge, and the Bay Bridge), the cities of San Francisco and Oakland, the Peninsula Range of the Santa Cruz Mountains and Mount Tamalpais. In addition to the hills themselves, the park encloses a substantial area of wetlands.

There are a number of archaeological sites within the park, preserving evidence of habitation by Native Americans of the Ohlone group of tribes, including shellmounds. Access to these sites is not allowed for casual visitors, but they can be visited by arrangement.

There is a substantial network of hiking trails in the park, most of them also available to equestrians, and 3.5 miles (5.6 km) to cyclists. Most of the trails are wide fireroads that go around the hills and the marshes, and one fireroad that runs north–south through the hills ridge. There are few narrow trails which are off limits to bikers and equestrians. These trails connect to others in the east bay, and the San Francisco Bay Trail passes through the park. Cross country meets for local schools are held occasionally in the park. The waters to the south and west of the park form part of the San Francisco Bay National Wildlife Refuge, and a great deal of wildlife can be seen from the park trails.

== History ==
The East Bay area's original inhabitants were the Ohlone Native American people. These native people were hunters and gatherers whose skills enabled them to live well off the land's natural bounty, where a large staple of their diet consisted of acorns. A great number of Ohlone native descendants still live in the Newark/Fremont/Union City area. At Coyote Hills Regional Park, much of this rich wetland is preserved, along with 2,000-year-old Tuibun Ohlone Indian shellmound sites.

Coyote Hills is home to the remnants of a large Project Nike missile base. It has intact facilities that are in disrepair and some still in place are used as radio transmission & microwave antenna stations. Guard stations are still visible throughout the park.

After the NIKE Missile Base was decommissioned, the Stanford Research Institute (SRI) occupied the base and area, and used the marshlands as facilities for Advanced Sonar Research, harboring many marine mammals, including dolphins. A firing range and aquifer exist on the southernmost hills. When SRI finished its mission in the mid-1960s, the site was dedicated for public use and turned over to EBRPD as manager in 1967.

== Activities ==
- Programs at the main shellmound site allow visitors to see a reconstructed tule house, shade shelter, pit house, and sweat lodge.
- Hiking is the principal activity. Several named trails are involved in making a 2.5 miles (4.0 km) loop around the park. A trail leads from the Visitor Center across the main road to a boardwalk that crosses the Main Marsh. At the end of the boardwalk, Muskrat Trail continues to the DUST (Demonstration Urban Stormwater Treatment) Trail, where the hiker can turn left onto Lizard Rock Trail, where he/she can see the chert outcroppings of the Coyote Hills, with the North Marsh visible on the right. Turn left onto the Bayview Trairailhen go uphill on the Nike Trail, which crosses the saddle of the hills and leads to the paved portion of Bayview Trail. This follows the shoreline, affording a view of the salt marshes and birds feeding on the water. Turn left at Soaproot Trail to go back uphill, and left again at Quail Trail to return to the Visitor Center.
- The Alameda Creek Trail runs12 miles (19 km) from San Francisco Bay to the mouth of Niles Canyon. It forms the northern border of Coyote Hills park, and is really two trails in parallel: an equestrian trail on the northern levee and a bicycle trail on the southern levee.
- Tours, open houses and school programs are offered at the Tuibun Ohlone Village site. The site includes an Ohlone-style family house, sweat house, and shade shelter. Reservations are required, and must be made in advance by calling (510) 544–3220.
- Picnicking is also a thing to do when you are visiting the park. Many picnic tables are located near the visitor center and near the Quarry Stagining Area. They are available for use on a first-come, first-served basis. Fires (for cooking purposes) are limited to the metal braziers on each camp site. (The Hoot Hollow picnic area is located above and behind the visitor center; reserve with the park before hand.)
- Group camping is available at the Dairy Glen campsite. This 50-person group camp is available with reservations. The site has picnic tables, a campfire ring, braziers, water, shade, and chemical toilets.
- Bicycling .The visitors may bike ride on the Bayview trail. The trail is 3.5 miles long, and it also connects with the other 12 miles of trail along the Alameda Creek Trail.

== Naturalist Programs and Nature Studies ==
The park has many staff members who practice many programs for the public. These programs include Native American history and culture, birds and butterflies, marsh and grassland ecology, and general nature exploration.

Nature studies; You can also bring your own tools to explore nature.

== Facilities ==
The Visitor Center is open Wednesday through Sunday, 10 a.m through 4 p.m.and closed on Thanksgiving and Christmas Day. It has a store that sells brochures and gifts. The store also has a naturalist who can answer visitors' questions about the park. The center offers programs about the area, such as bird walking and native culture (e.g., making acorn soup). Clean restrooms and an outdoor picnic area are also at the center. A bird and butterfly nectar garden is adjacent to the Visitor Center.

The Nectar Garden is a beautiful garden located near the Visitor Center. At this present time, the garden is open to the public from Wednesday to Sunday, from 10 a.m. to 4p.m. Many educational programs are provided in the garden during the year.

== Fees and other rules ==
The parking fee is $5.00 per vehicle ($4.00 per trailered vehicle. Bus fees are $25.00 each. Dogs are welcome, but must be leashed and under control at all times. There is a $2.00 fee for each dog. Guide and service dogs are exempt from the fee.
