= Leslie Salt =

Salt-producing company based in the San Francisco Bay area

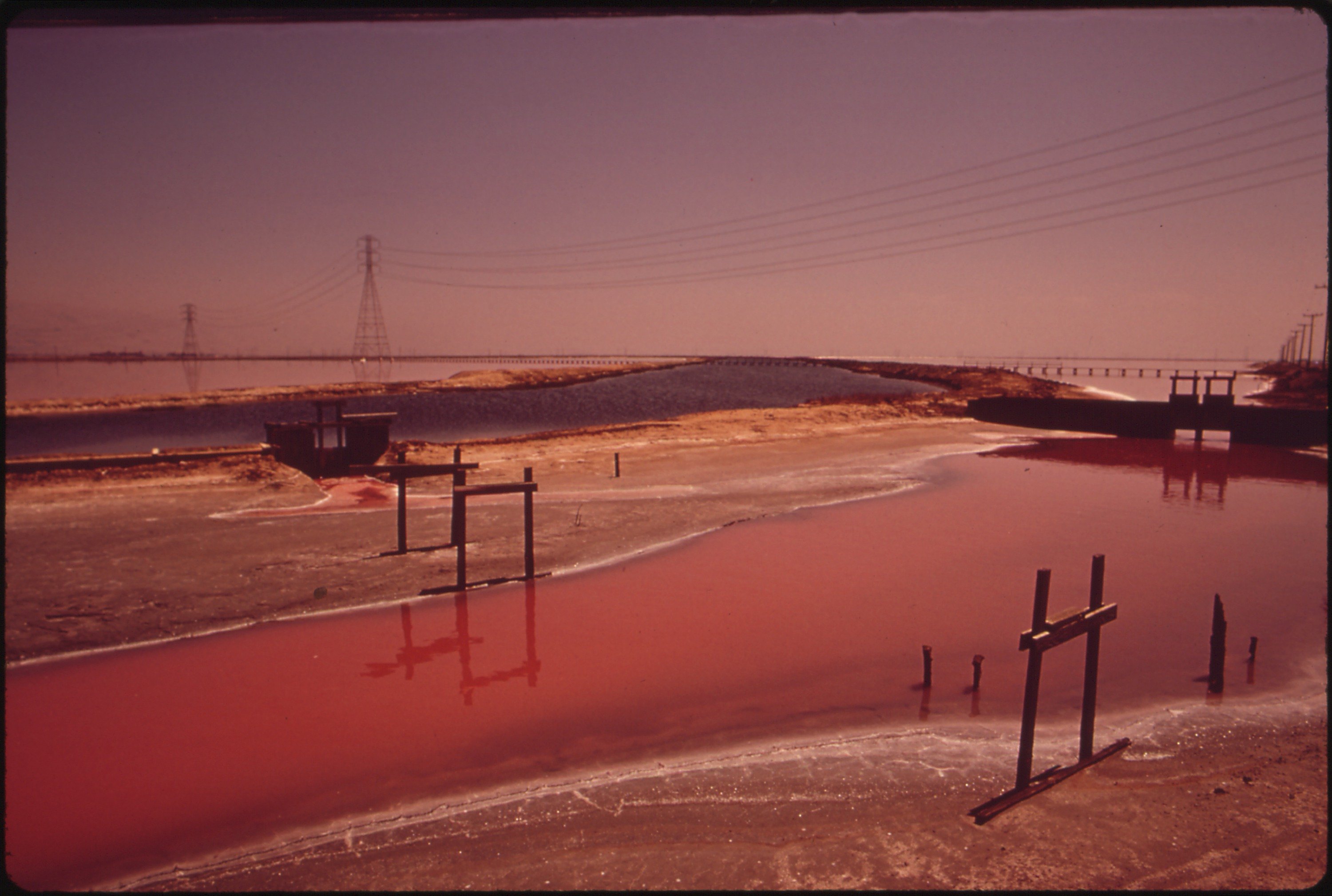
Leslie Salt ponds, 1972

The Leslie Salt Company was a salt-producing company located in the San Francisco Bay Area, at the current locations of Newark, Hayward and other parts of the bay.

== Background ==
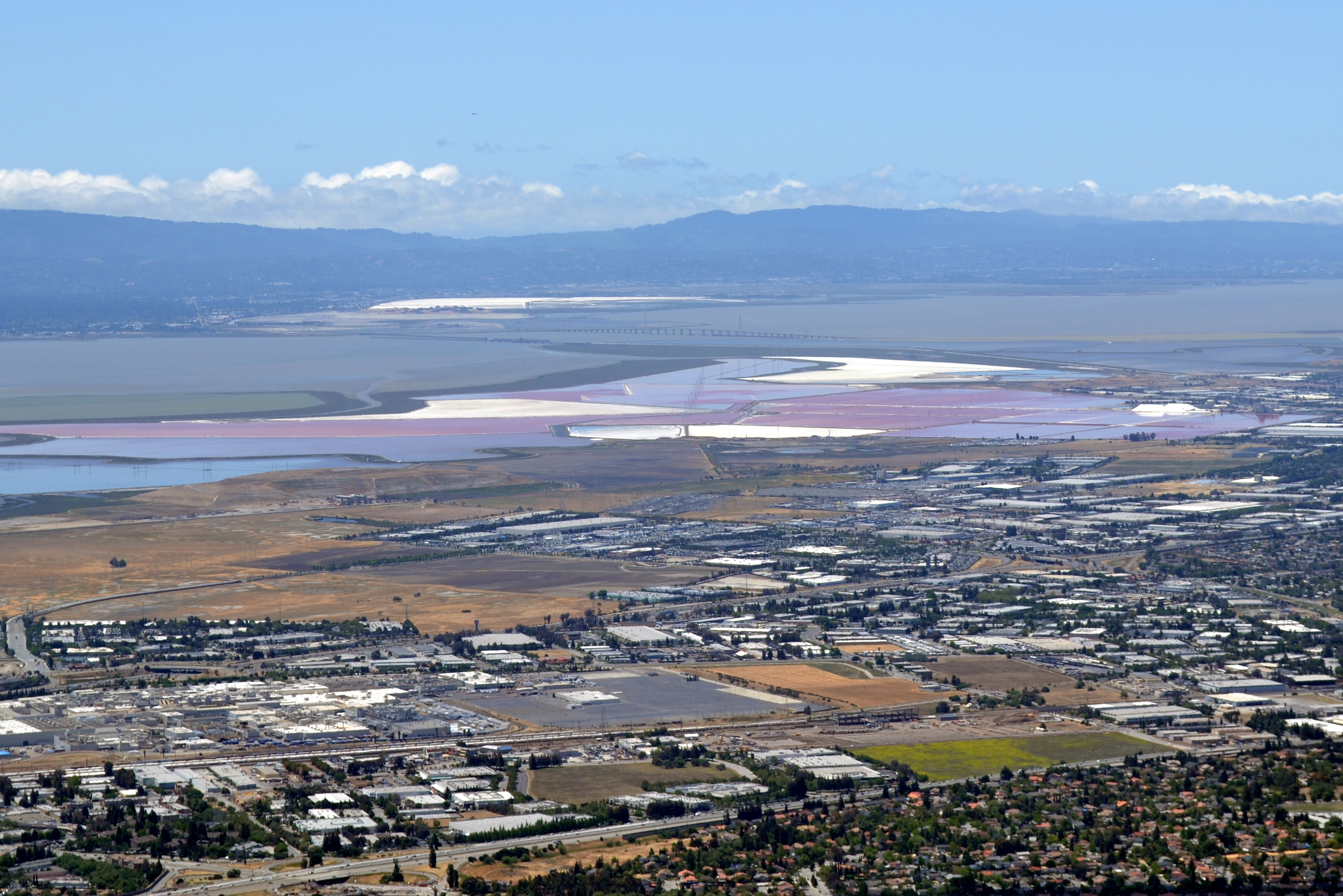
Cargill salt ponds near Newark in 2014

According to the San Francisco Chronicle in 1983, Leslie Salt had "been in business since 1901 and since 1978 [had] been a subsidiary of Minneapolis-based Cargill Inc".

The name of the "Leslie Salt Refining Company" was abbreviated to "Leslie Salt" in 1936 after the consolidation of California Salt Co. and the Continental Salt & Chemical Co.

The company produced salt using salt evaporation ponds on the shores of the San Francisco Bay. By the 1940s, Leslie Salt under the dominant ownership of the Schilling family had become the largest private land owner in the Bay Area. By 1959, they were producing more than one million tons of salt annually, on over 26,000 acres (11,000 ha) of bay salt ponds. They were purchased by Cargill in 1978. It continued to operate as a subsidiary of Cargill afterwards; the "Leslie" name continued to be used until 1991.

== See also ==
- Oliver Salt Company
- Eden Landing Ecological Reserve
- Laguna Creek Watershed
- Don Edwards San Francisco Bay National Wildlife Refuge
