= Ellicott Slough National Wildlife Refuge =

United States National Wildlife Refuge

- IUCN category IV (habitat/species management area)
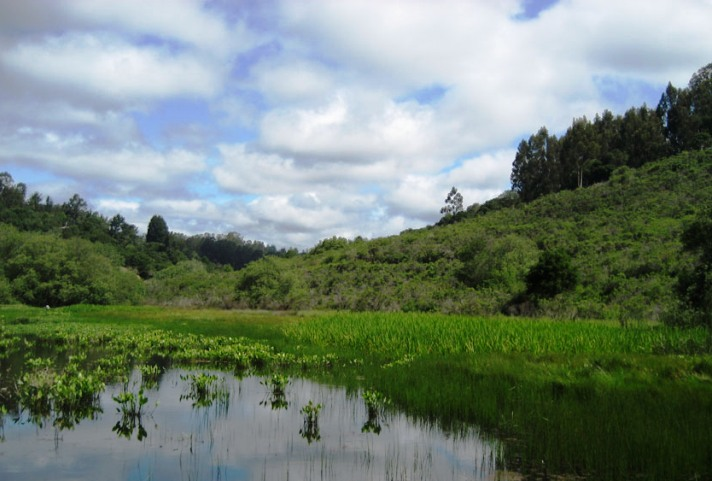
- Calabasas Pond

- Location within the United States
- Location: Santa Cruz County, California, United States
- Nearest city: Watsonville, California
- Coordinates: 36.92661°N 121.838°W
- Area: 168 acres (0.68 km^{2})
- Established: 1975
- Governing body: U.S. Fish and Wildlife Service
- Website: Ellicott Slough National Wildlife Refuge

The Ellicott Slough National Wildlife Refuge is a United States National Wildlife Refuge located in the northern part of the Monterey Bay area of California.

Originally established to protect the habitat of the threatened Santa Cruz long-toed salamander subspecies, Ellicott Slough also harbors other species later federally listed as threatened due to habitat loss, including the California red-legged frog, California tiger salamander and robust spineflower.

The refuge was established after the California Department of Fish and Game purchased the property from its original owner. It is made up of four discontinuous units all separated by less than 2.7 miles.

The refuge experiences a mild climate influenced by the Pacific Ocean. Temperatures are generally from 50 to 75 °F (10 to 24 °C). The terrain is both hilly and flat.

== Ellicott Unit ==
The Ellicott Unit is one of the two units that has a pond. The Ellicott pond is breeding habitat for the Santa Cruz long-toed salamander. Ecosystems in the area include northern coastal scrub, San Andreas coastal live oak woodland, riparian woodland, closed-coned coniferous forest and California coastal prairie. There are a few houses and farms nearby

== Calabasas Unit ==
The Calabasas Unit is the northernmost unit. A man-made water reservoir was largely destroyed in 1980 and the remaining dam and outflow were reinforced in 1994 and 2006. Homes surround the unit.

== Harkins Slough Unit ==
The Harkins Slough Unit is the southernmost unit, adjacent to the Buena Vista Landfill. The unit contains some buildings and houses that are neglected and in need of repair. It is habitat for seabirds such as gulls and white pelicans.

== Buena Vista Property ==
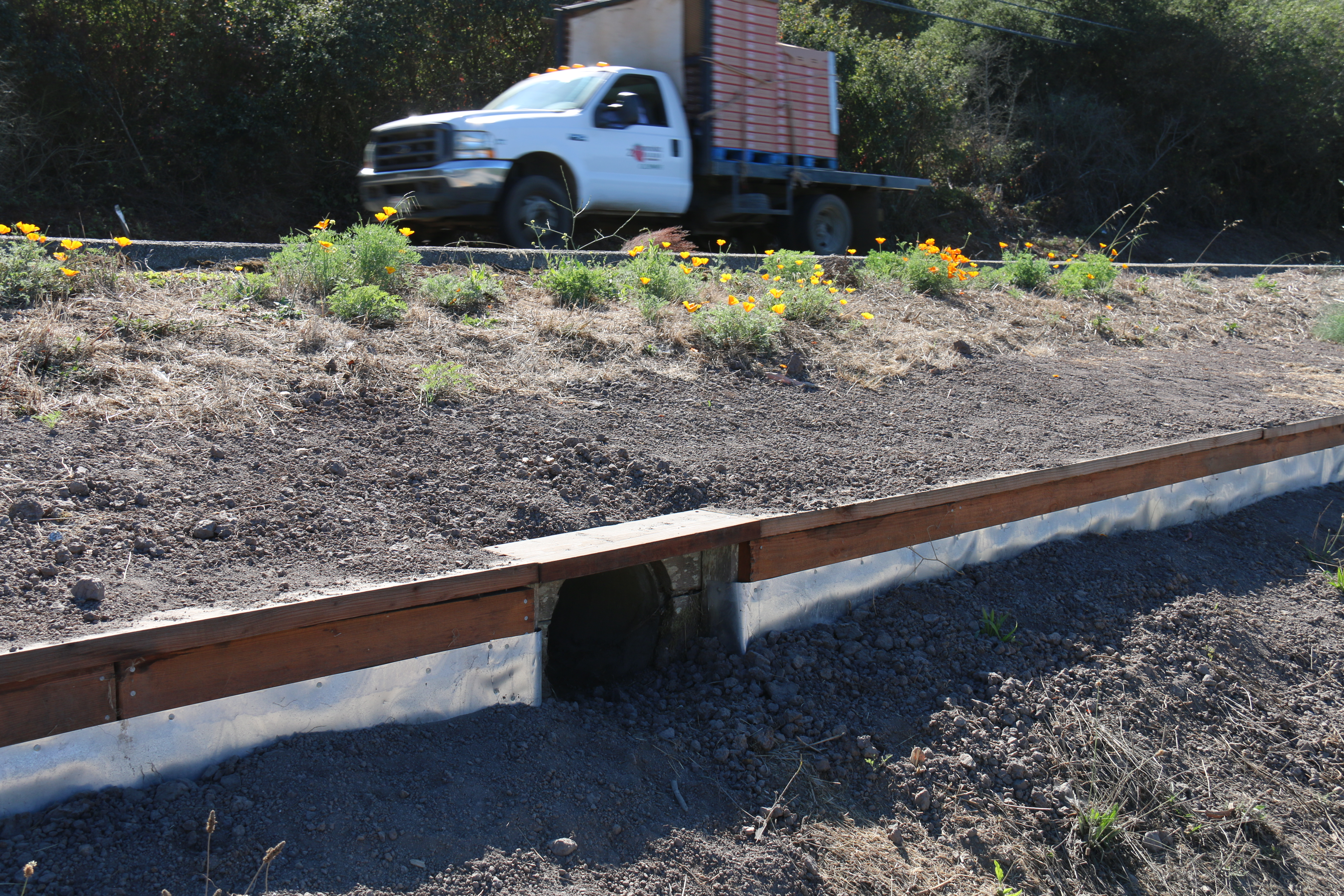
Amphibian and reptile tunnel in California near the Ellicott Slough National Wildlife Refuge

The Buena Vista Unit is adjacent to California State Route 1 and is mostly undisturbed with the exception of one house and one garage that were built in 1951. It is the location of the other strip of Santa Cruz long-toed salamander breeding habitat.
