= Eden Landing, California =

Former settlement in Alameda County, California, U.S.

Coordinates: 37°38′40.76″N 122°9′21.87″W

Eden Landing (also Mount Eden Landing, Edendale, Barrons Landing, Barron's Landing, and Peterman's Landing) is a former settlement in Alameda County, California, United States. Eden Landing was located west-southwest of Mount Eden. Its site is now located within the corporate limits of Hayward. Eden Landing was established in 1854 by farmers who were dissatisfied with the freight charges at Allen's Landing, which was one-quarter of a mile (400 m) west. The place was bought by Richard Barron in 1855, and renamed Barrons Landing. Henry Louis Petermann and Mary F. Petermann operated their salt works here. Stokes Landing was located east of Eden Landing on Alameda Creek.

A post office operated at Edendale from 1873 to 1875. Coordinates were obtained from USGS GNIS for Barron's Landing.

== See also ==
- Eden Landing Ecological Reserve, in the same region
- Eden Township, a former township that includes the present-day cities of Hayward and San Leandro
- Mt. Eden, an area of Hayward
