= Don Edwards San Francisco Bay National Wildlife Refuge =

United States National Wildlife Reserve in San Francisco Bay

- IUCN category IV (habitat/species management area)
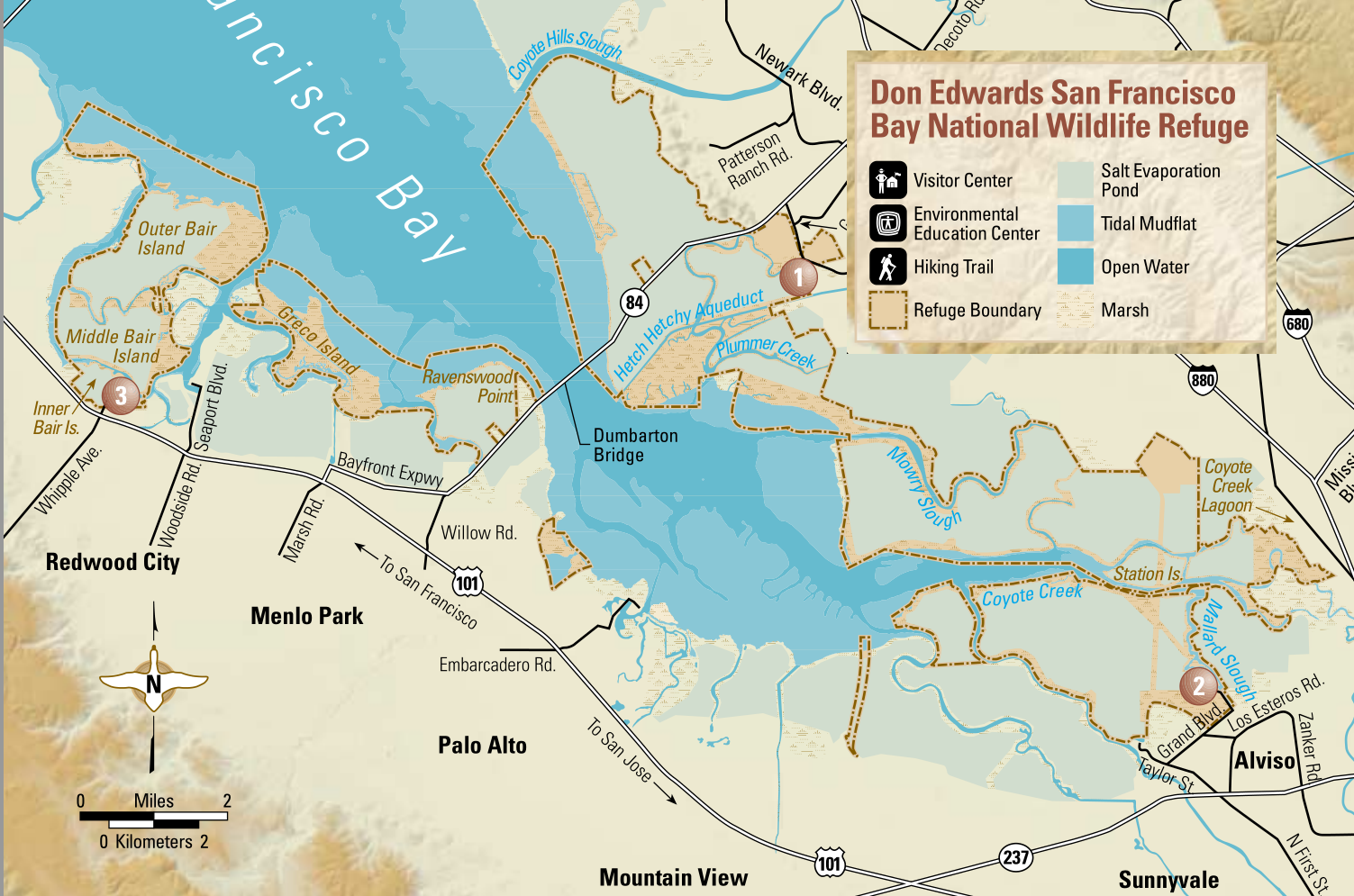
- Map of the DESFBNWR (2003)

- Location within San Francisco Bay Area Location within California Location within the United States
- Location: Alameda County, San Mateo County, Santa Clara County, California, United States
- Nearest city: Newark, California
- Coordinates: 37°30′00″N 122°07′00″W
- Area: 30,000 acres (120 km^{2})
- Established: 1974; 52 years ago
- Governing body: U.S. Fish and Wildlife Service
- Website: www.fws.gov/refuge/don_edwards_san_francisco_bay/

Don Edwards San Francisco Bay National Wildlife Refuge (DESFBNWR) is a United States National Wildlife Refuge located in the southern part of San Francisco Bay, California. Its headquarters and visitor center are in the Baylands district of Fremont, next to Coyote Hills Regional Park, in Alameda County. The visitor center is on Marshlands Rd, off Thornton Ave.

Most of the refuge stretches along the marshy shoreline north and south of the Dumbarton Bridge, but Bair Island, in San Mateo County, is also part of the system. The southernmost extent is in northern Santa Clara County.

== History ==
It was founded in 1974 as the first urban National Wildlife Refuge established in the United States, amidst a growing public interest in environmental protection. The refuge's lands had previously been extremely profitable for oyster growers in the nineteenth century and later salt producers. During the late 1950s, there was an effort to fill the bay and its tidelands in order to create land for urban development, as articulated in the “2020 plan”, an U.S. Department of Commerce report. In response, local activists advocated for the protection and public access of the land, much of which was privately owned by companies like Leslie Salt.

In 1965, activists’ efforts culminated in the McAteer-Petris Act, which created the San Francisco Bay Conservation and Development Commission (BCDC) to develop a plan for the conservation and use of the bay. In 1969, the Commission became a permanent state agency with new regulatory and enforcement abilities over the tidelands; however, the commission was soon caught up in lawsuits filed by private investors and local governments seeking to develop land.

Alongside other Bay Area locals, Arthur Ogilvie, a member of the Santa Clara Planning Department, grew concerned about the commission's limited power in protecting privately owned salt ponds. Ogilvie helped organize the South San Francisco Bay Lands Planning Conservation and National Wildlife Refuge Committee to advocate for the use of land as a wildlife refuge rather than for development. Influenced by public pressure, the Bureau of Outdoor Recreation and the Bureau of Sport Fisheries and Wildlife produced a joint report in 1971 calling for the creation of a San Francisco Bay National Wildlife Refuge. The report pushed for the federal purchase of 22,000 acres of salt ponds to permanently protect wildlife habitats and create opportunities for human recreation and education.

A 1972 bill allocated federal, state, and local governmental funding to purchase the initial land and create the refuge. From 1977 through 2003, the refuge continued to grow with additional funding from Congress to purchase more salt ponds from Cargill, the company that bought the mineral rights to the salt ponds from Leslie Salt Company.

The refuge is dedicated to preserving and enhancing wildlife habitat, protecting migratory birds, protecting threatened and endangered species, and providing opportunities for wildlife-oriented recreation and nature study for the surrounding communities.

As of 2004, the refuge spanned 30,000 acres (120 km^{2}) of open bay, salt pond, salt marsh, mudflat, upland and vernal pool habitats located throughout south San Francisco Bay. This area includes the traditional lands of the Lamchin, Puichon, Alson, and Tuibun indigenous groups. About 9,000 acres (36 km^{2}) of salt ponds within the refuge are managed by Cargill Salt, which has perpetual salt-making rights. Cargill uses the salt ponds to concentrate brines as part of its solar salt operation which produces salt for food, agriculture, medical, and industrial uses throughout the Western United States.

Located along the Pacific Flyway, the refuge hosts over 280 species of birds each year. The variety of birds that may call the refuge home or use it as a stopover include white pelicans, white-tailed kites, hawks, ospreys, and eagles. Millions of shorebirds and waterfowl stop to refuel here during the spring and fall migration. It also provides critical habitat to resident species like the endangered California clapper rail and salt marsh harvest mouse. Hundreds of thousands of people visit its diverse wildlife and habitats each year.

The DESFBNWR is one of six wildlife refuges in the San Francisco Bay Area. The others are: Antioch Dunes, Ellicott Slough, Farallon, Marin Islands, and San Pablo Bay. It was renamed in 1995 in recognition of Congressman Don Edwards and his efforts to protect sensitive wetlands in south San Francisco Bay.

== Salt Pond Spills ==
The refuge's area includes a notable portion of the South Bay salt ponds, which have been used for salt by the native Ohlone populations, Spanish missionaries, and later settlers and commercial businesses throughout the nineteenth century. Cargill Corporation holds the majority of the mineral rights on the salt ponds as of 2023.

The commercial salt making process produces bittern, an extremely concentrated liquid byproduct that can be ten times as salty as ocean water. Because of its toxic nature, bittern can be lethal to many forms of aquatic wildlife. Cargill has stored bittern in the South Bay. From 1999 through 2006, Cargill was responsible for six major spills of toxic brine in the Bay Area marshes, sloughs, and wetlands, including land in the DESFBNWR. This amounted to roughly a total of 565,000 gallons of toxic material spilled. In 2000, 3,000 gallons of brine were blown from Cargill's storage ponds into Mowry Slough, a slough within the DESFBNWR. In 2005, a Cargill worker mistakenly opened a valve in a rail car, resulting in thousands of gallons of bittern spilled into Newark Slough. In 2006, a pipe blowout led to 218,000 gallons of bittern spilling into the Newark Marsh, which killed fish and vegetation in the Refuge.

In 2003, Cargill transferred 16,500 acres of salt ponds to government management. The majority of this land was added to the DESFBNWR, kicking off the beginning of the South Bay Salt Pond Restoration Project in 2004. The goal of the project is to restore 15,100 acres of industrial salt evaporation ponds into tidal marshland. The project encompasses three sites, two of which are in the DESFBNWR. The project's three main focuses are restoration, recreation, and protection.

As of 2023, amidst concerns about sea level rise or earthquakes leading to spillage into the DESFBNWR, Cargill has proposed a new pipeline project to dispose of bittern. The pipe would funnel bittern to the East Bay Dischargers Authority's wastewater treatment system in San Leandro, where the bittern would be diluted with treated wastewater. This processing would allow the resulting liquid to be safely released back into the bay.

== Gallery ==
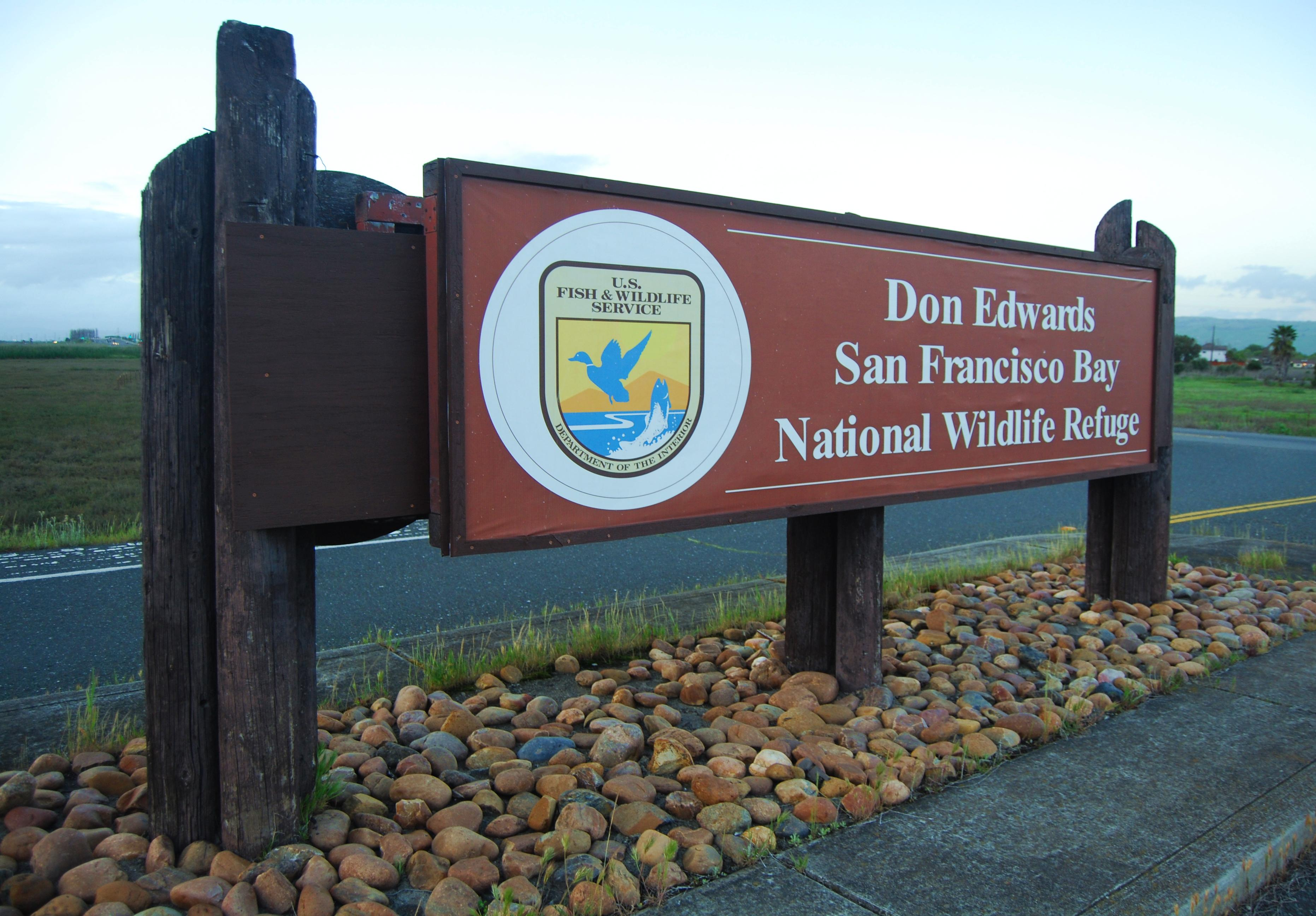
The sign at the refuge's entrance

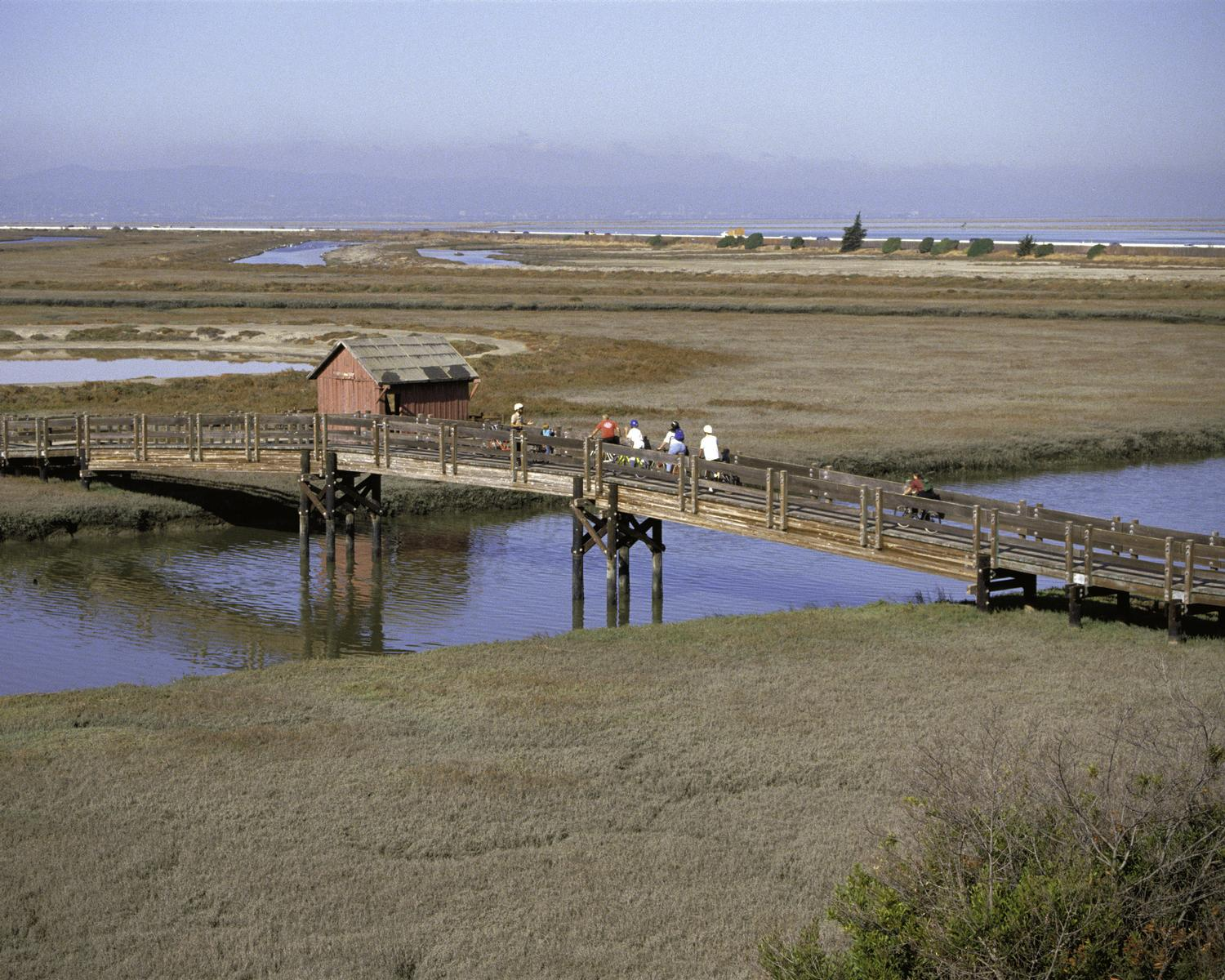
Near the visitors' center

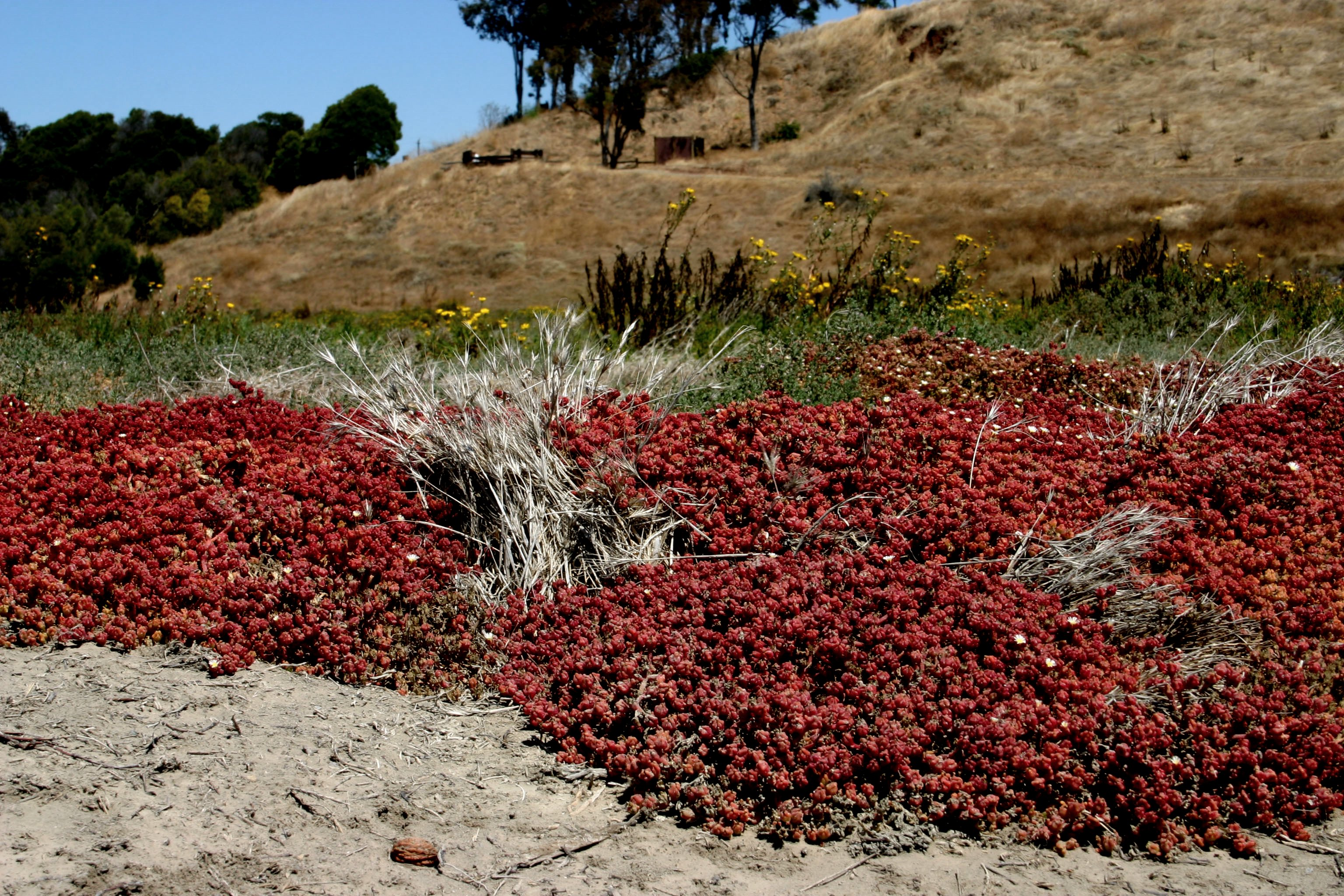
Ecotone, 2005

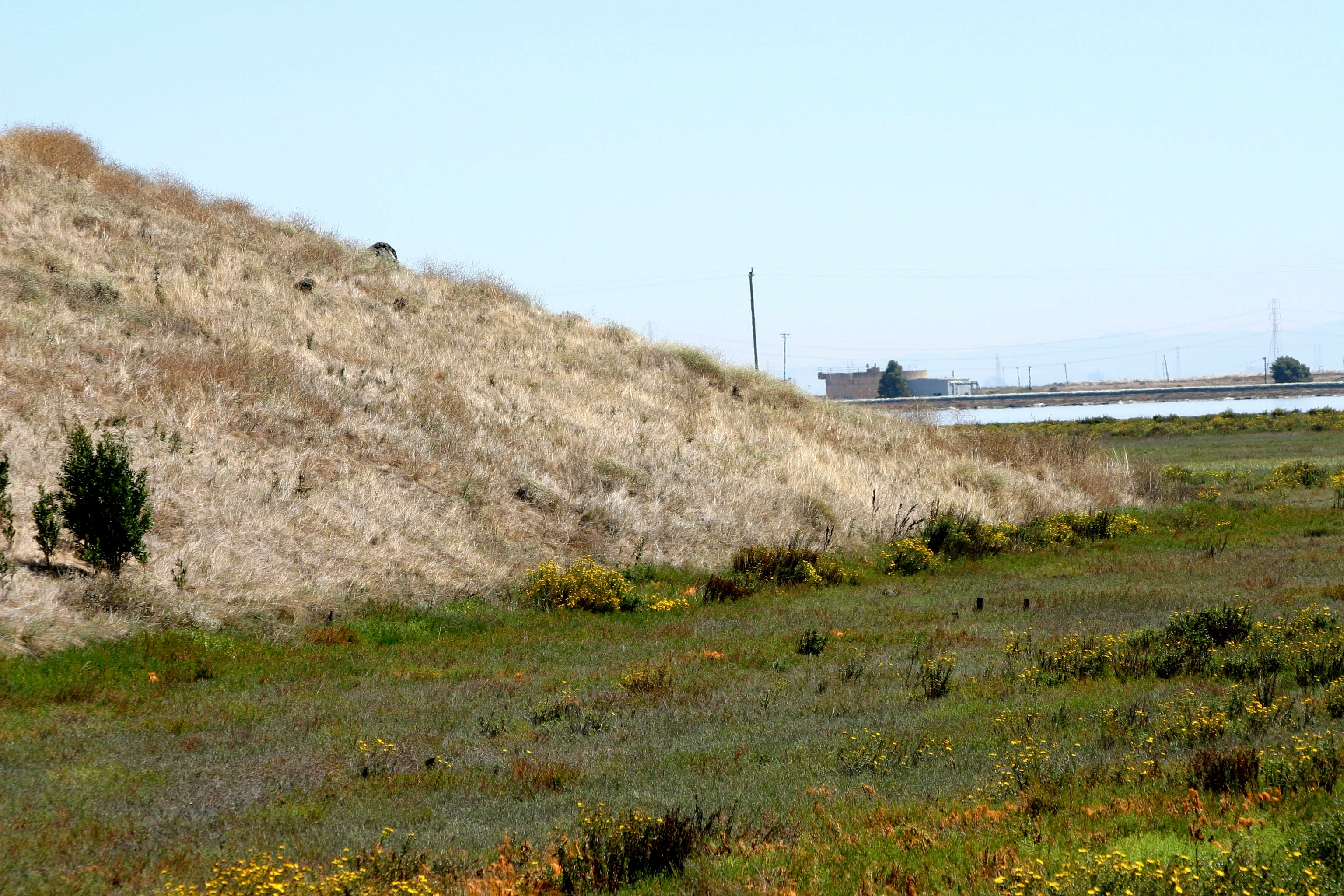
Freshwater slough and dry hill, Summer, 2005

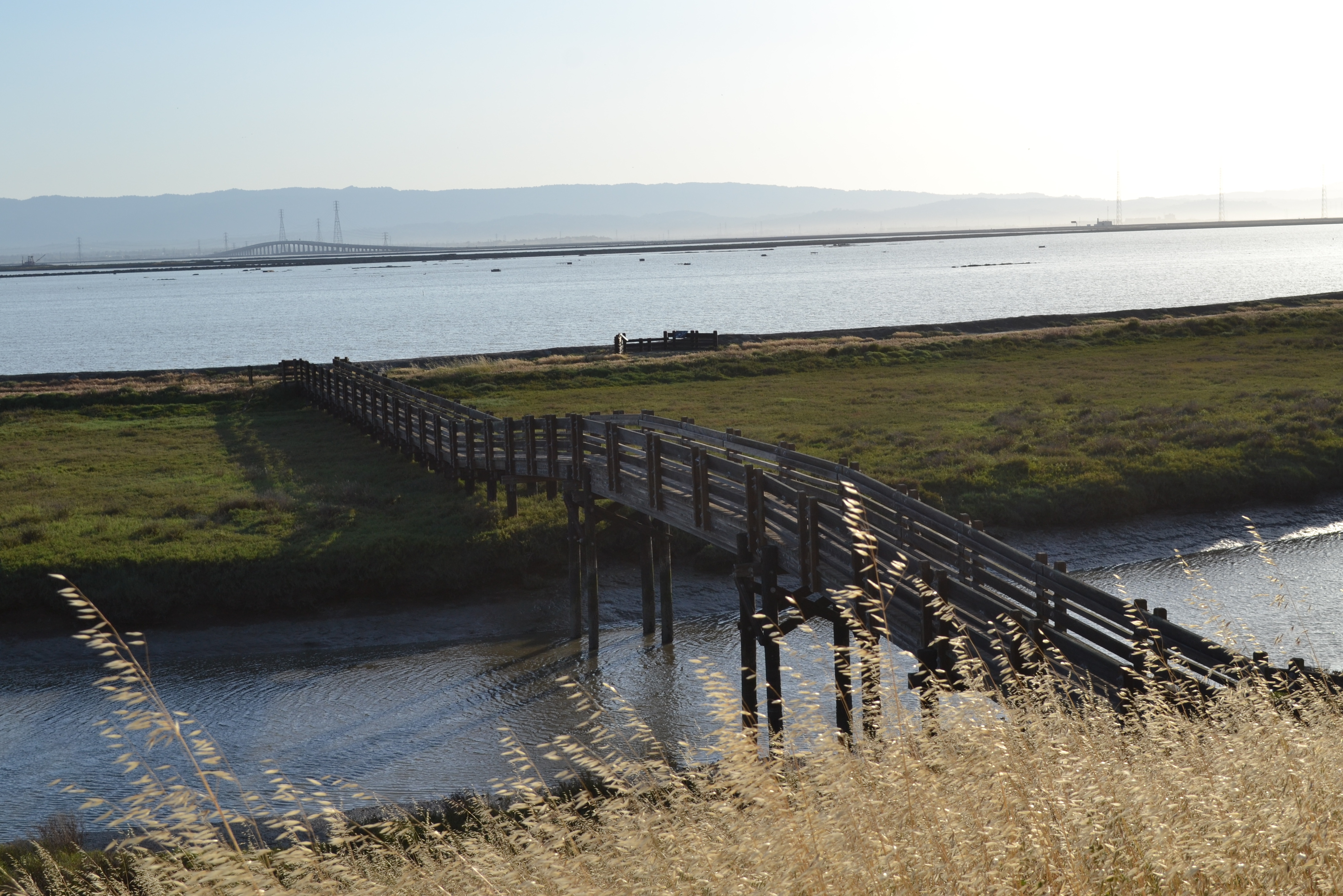
Salt evaporation ponds, with the Dumbarton Bridge in the background

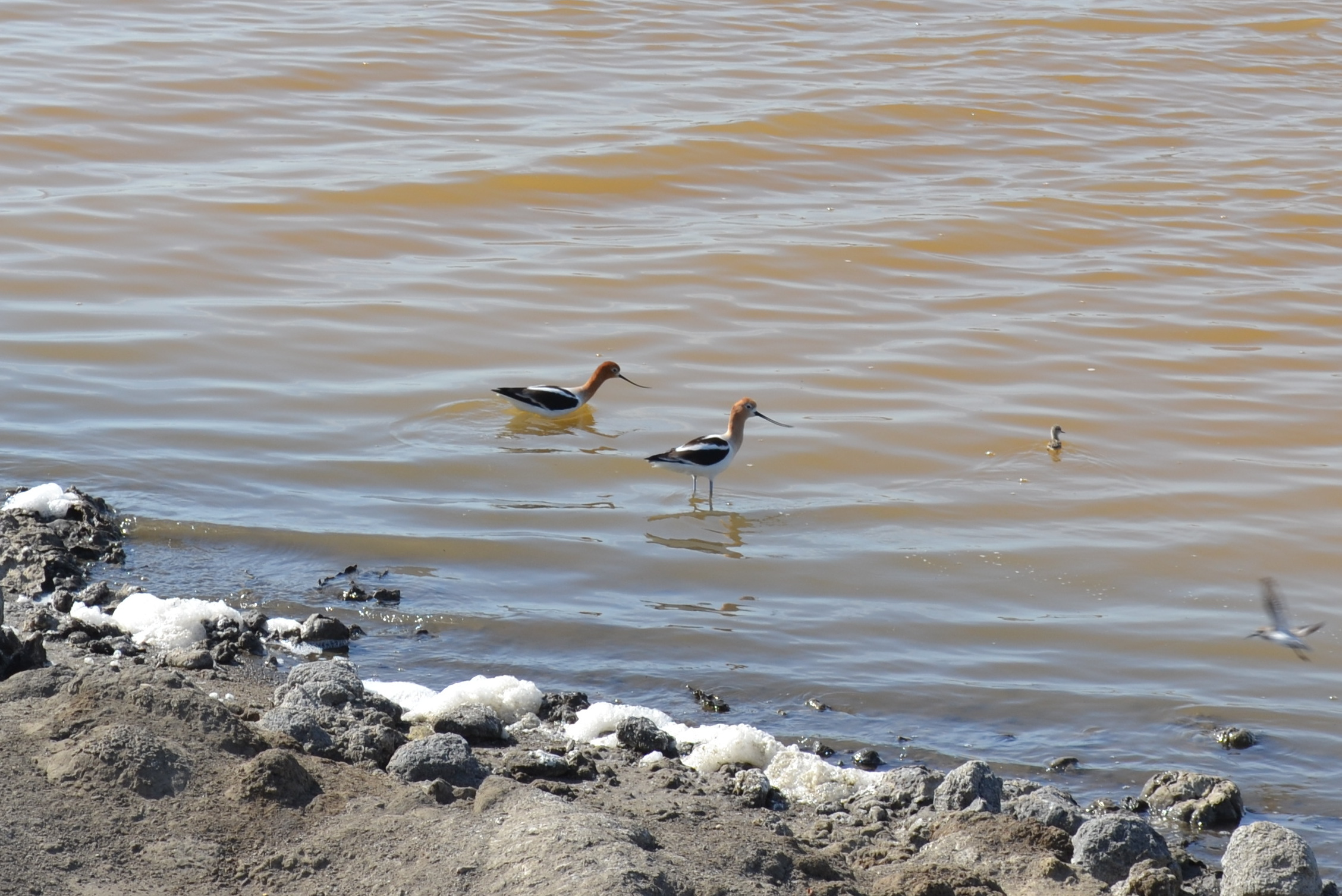
Birds in the salt pond

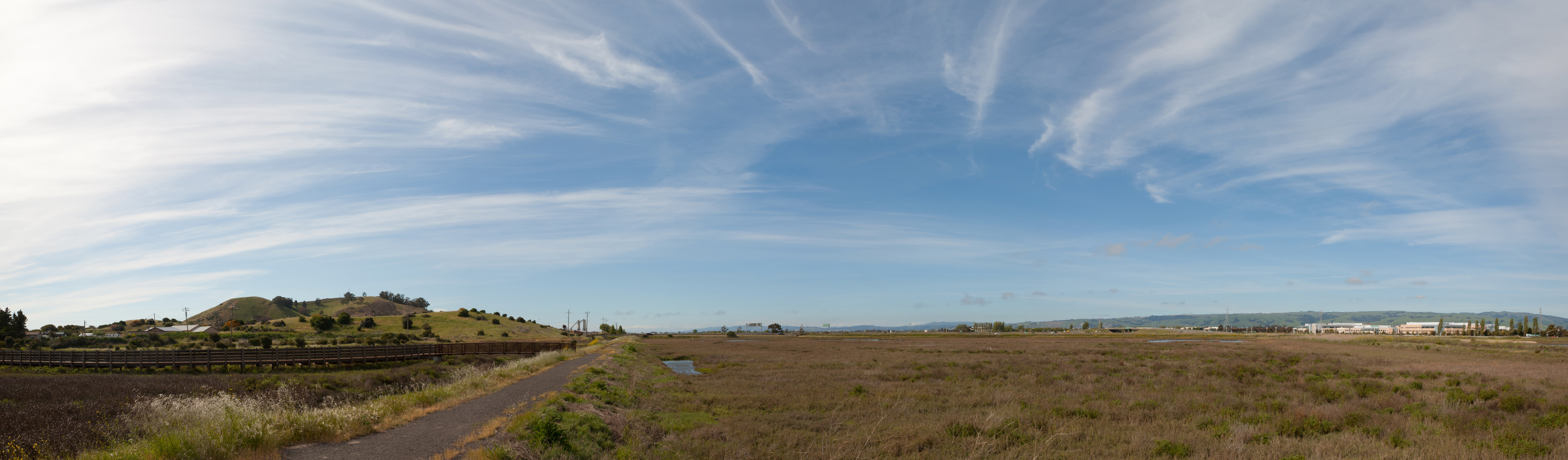
Panorama of La Riviere Marsh, a salt marsh, near Marshlands Rd.
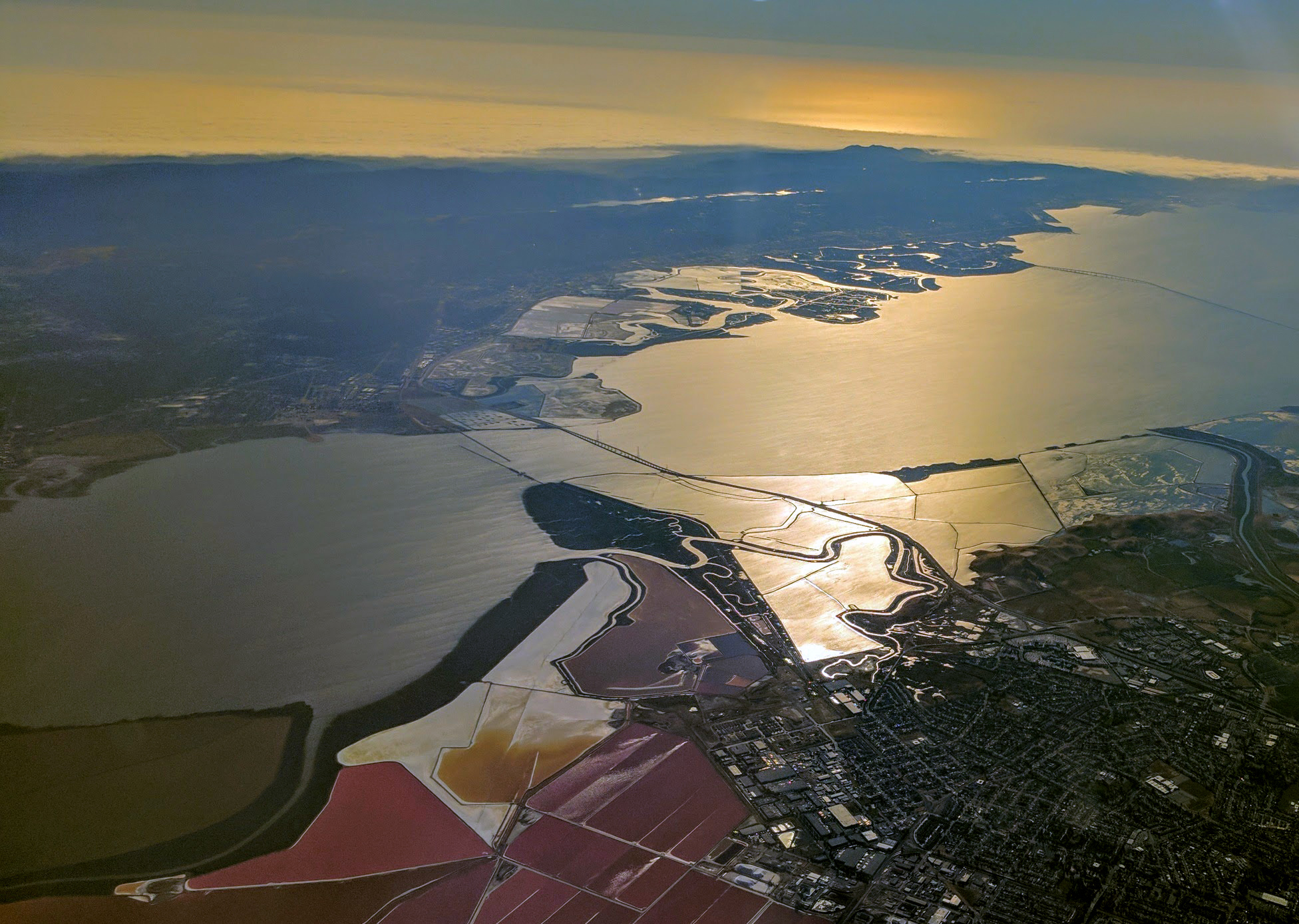
Aerial view looking west, into the evening sun, across the Don Edwards San Francisco Bay National Wildlife Refuge. With the exception of the red ponds in the foreground, most of the wetlands visible are in the refuge, including the dark green area by the Mowry Slough in the lower left, the area on both sides of the meandering Plummer Creek near the east end of the Dumbarton bridge, and areas on the far side of the bridge on both sides of the bay, up through the brightly reflecting Bair Island area in the top center.

== See also ==
- Bair Island
- Mowry Slough
- Greco Island
- Newby Island landfill
- Coyote Hills Regional Park
- Drawbridge, California
