= List of tunnels in California =

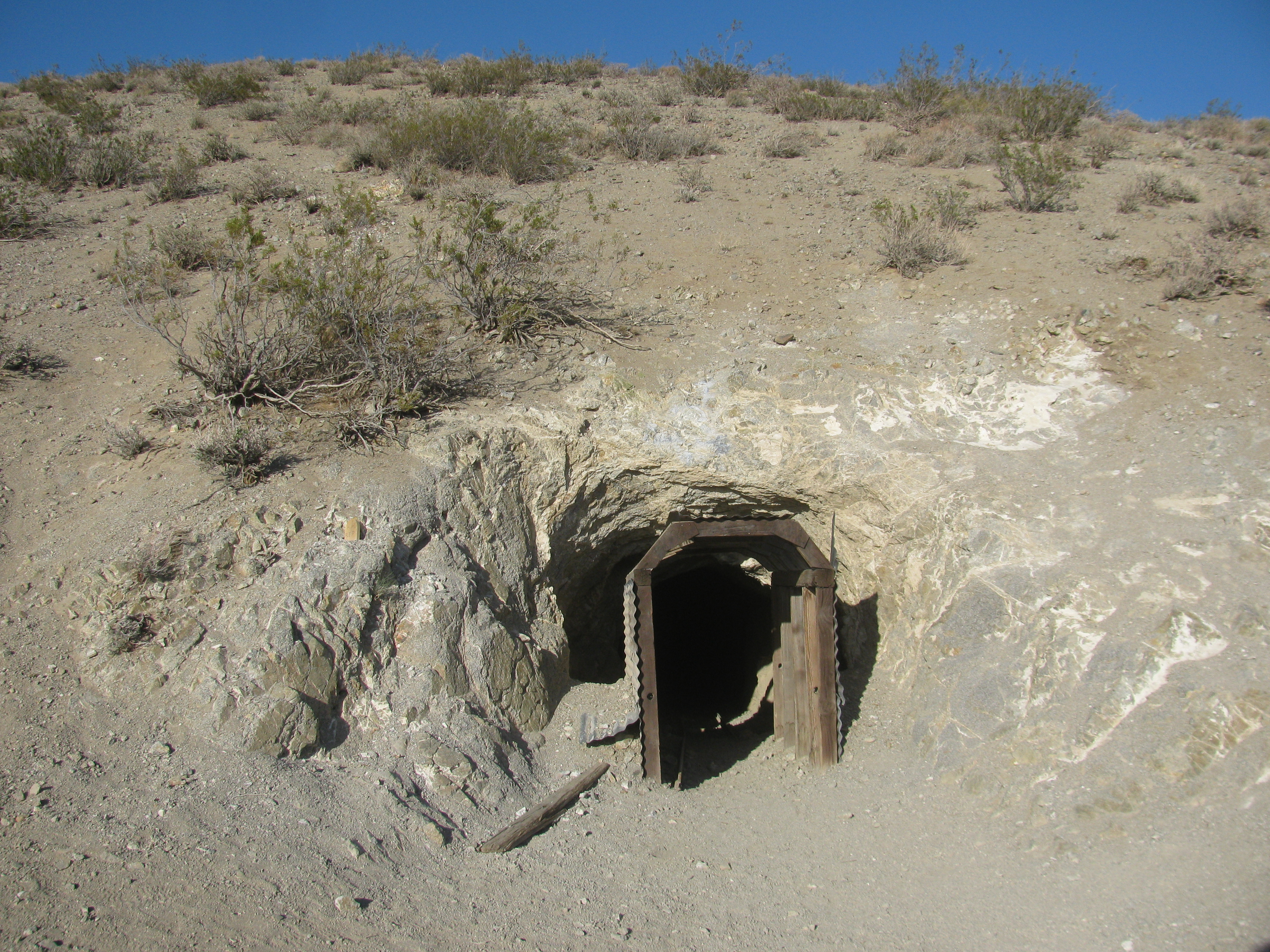
Burro Schmidt Tunnel, Kern County

The following is a list of tunnels in California.

== Rail ==
=== Mass transit ===
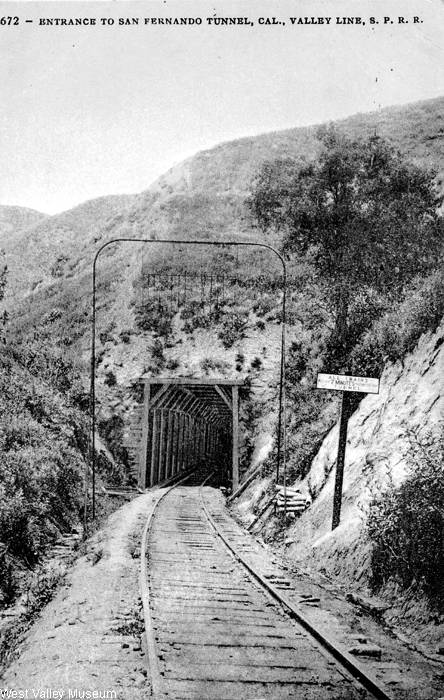
San Fernando Tunnel c. 1900

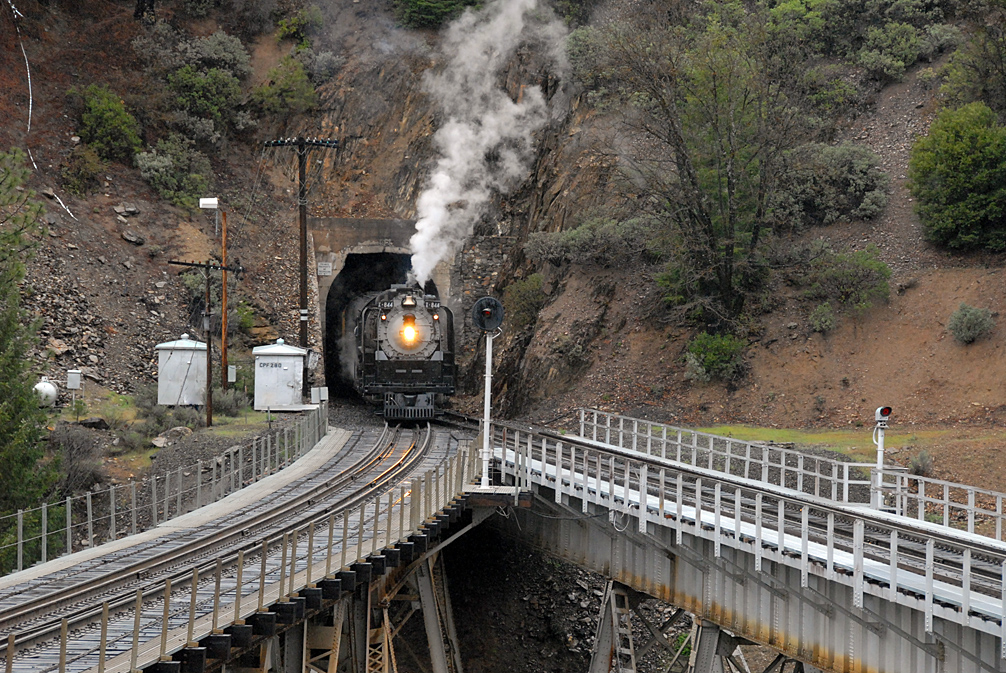
UP 844 emerges from Tunnel 31 (May 2009)

- Altamont Corridor Express
  - (two) Union Pacific Railroad (formerly Western Pacific Railroad) in Niles Canyon, Alameda County: one 4,500 feet (1,400 m) long and the other 450 feet (140 m) long
- BART
  - Balboa Park station complex
  - Berkeley Hills Tunnel, rapid transit tunnel, BART beneath Grizzly Peak between Orinda and Oakland
  - Berkeley Subway, beneath Berkeley
  - Broadway Subway in Oakland, including the Oakland Wye
  - Fremont Central Park Subway, underneath Lake Elizabeth
  - Market Street subway twin-level rapid transit and light rail tunnel beneath Market Street in San Francisco (shared with Muni Metro)
  - Milpitas station
  - Lundy/Sierra tunnel
  - Silicon Valley BART extension Phase 3 (planned)
  - Transbay Tube, rapid transit tunnel, BART beneath San Francisco Bay between Oakland and San Francisco
  - San Francisco International Airport extension
- Caltrain
  - (five) Bayshore Cutoff, originally built by the Southern Pacific railroad, tunnel 5 abandoned in 1956
  - The Portal (proposed)
    - Salesforce Transit Center train box
- Los Angeles Metro Rail
  - (three) K Line (under construction)
  - Figueroa Tunnel, on the E Line
  - Flower Street tunnel, carrying the A and E Lines to the 7th Street/Metro Center station
  - L Line subway, between Indiana and Pico/Aliso stations
  - Los Angeles Subway, including the B Line and D Line
  - Regional Connector
- Metrolink
  - San Fernando Tunnel, rail tunnel, Union Pacific Railroad (formerly Southern Pacific Railroad), Santa Clarita
  - (three) Simi Valley Tunnels/Santa Susana Tunnels, rail tunnels, Union Pacific Railroad (formerly Southern Pacific Railroad), between Los Angeles and Simi Valley through the Santa Susana Mountains; the longest and westernmost is Tunnel No. 26
- San Francisco Municipal Railway (Muni Metro)
  - Central Subway
  - Sunset Tunnel, light rail tunnel beneath Buena Vista Park
  - Twin Peaks Tunnel, light rail tunnel beneath Twin Peaks
  - Market Street subway twin-level rapid transit and light rail tunnel beneath Market Street in San Francisco (shared with BART)
- Sonoma–Marin Area Rail Transit
  - Cal Park Hill Tunnel, beneath California Park, also features a pedestrian/bicycle path
  - Puerto Suello Hill Tunnel, commuter rail tunnel
- SDSU Transit Center, the only subway station in the San Diego Trolley system
- VTA light rail tunnel under San Jose Diridon station

==== Abandoned ====
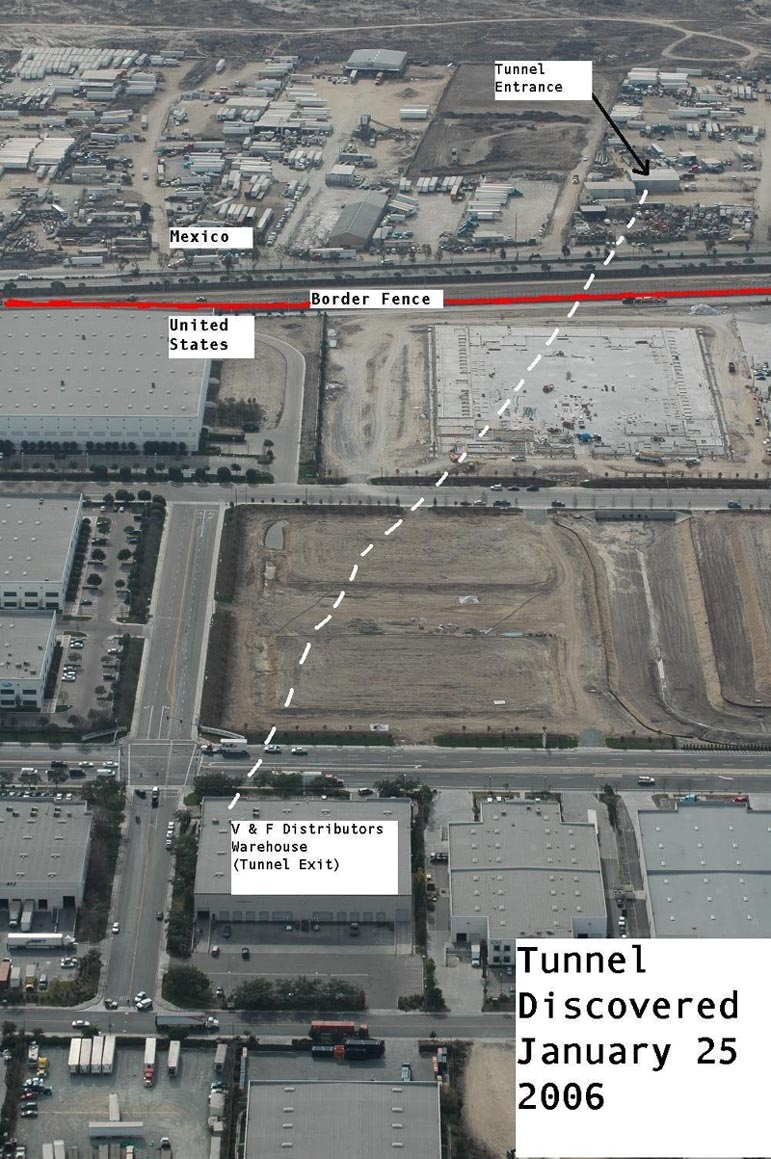
Sinaloa Cartel Drug Rail Tunnel, San Diego-Tijuana

- Belmont Tunnel/Toluca Substation and Yard
- (five) North Pacific Coast Railroad tunnels, including:
  - Alto Tunnel
- Tunnel 8, former Northwestern Pacific Railroad tunnel
- Shepherd Canyon, used by the Sacramento Northern Railway
- (five) Wrights, Laurel, Zayante, Tunnel 5, and Mountain Charlie Tunnels; built by the South Pacific Coast Railroad (Tunnel 7 daylighted c. 1950s)

=== Freight and intercity rail ===
- Fort Mason Tunnel, former rail tunnel beneath Fort Mason, San Francisco
- Point Richmond Tunnel, carrying BNSF freight parallel to the road tunnel in Point Richmond
- Summit Tunnel (Tunnel No. 6), abandoned rail tunnel, Central Pacific Railroad, one of a number through the Donner Pass area of the Sierra Nevada
- The Big Hole, Tunnel No. 41, built to replace Tunnel No. 6 through the Donner Pass and carrying the Union Pacific Railroad
- (34) Feather River Route, including:
  - Chilcoot Tunnel
  - Spring Garden Tunnel
  - Keddie Wye, tunnels Tunnel No. 31 and No. 32 in the wye complex
- Mission Tunnel, below Mission Santa Cruz and used by the Santa Cruz, Big Trees and Pacific Railway
- (three) BNSF Gateway Subdivision
- (three) BNSF Stockton Subdivision, including:
  - Franklin Tunnel
- (six) Union Pacific Coast Subdivision
  - Tunnel No. 6 (Coast Line)
- Tehachapi Loop Tunnel, rail tunnel, 1876, Union Pacific Railroad (formerly, Southern Pacific Railroad), just north of State Route 58 between Tehachapi and Bakersfield

=== Excursion ===
- (two) California Western Railroad, popularly called the Skunk Train

== Automotive ==
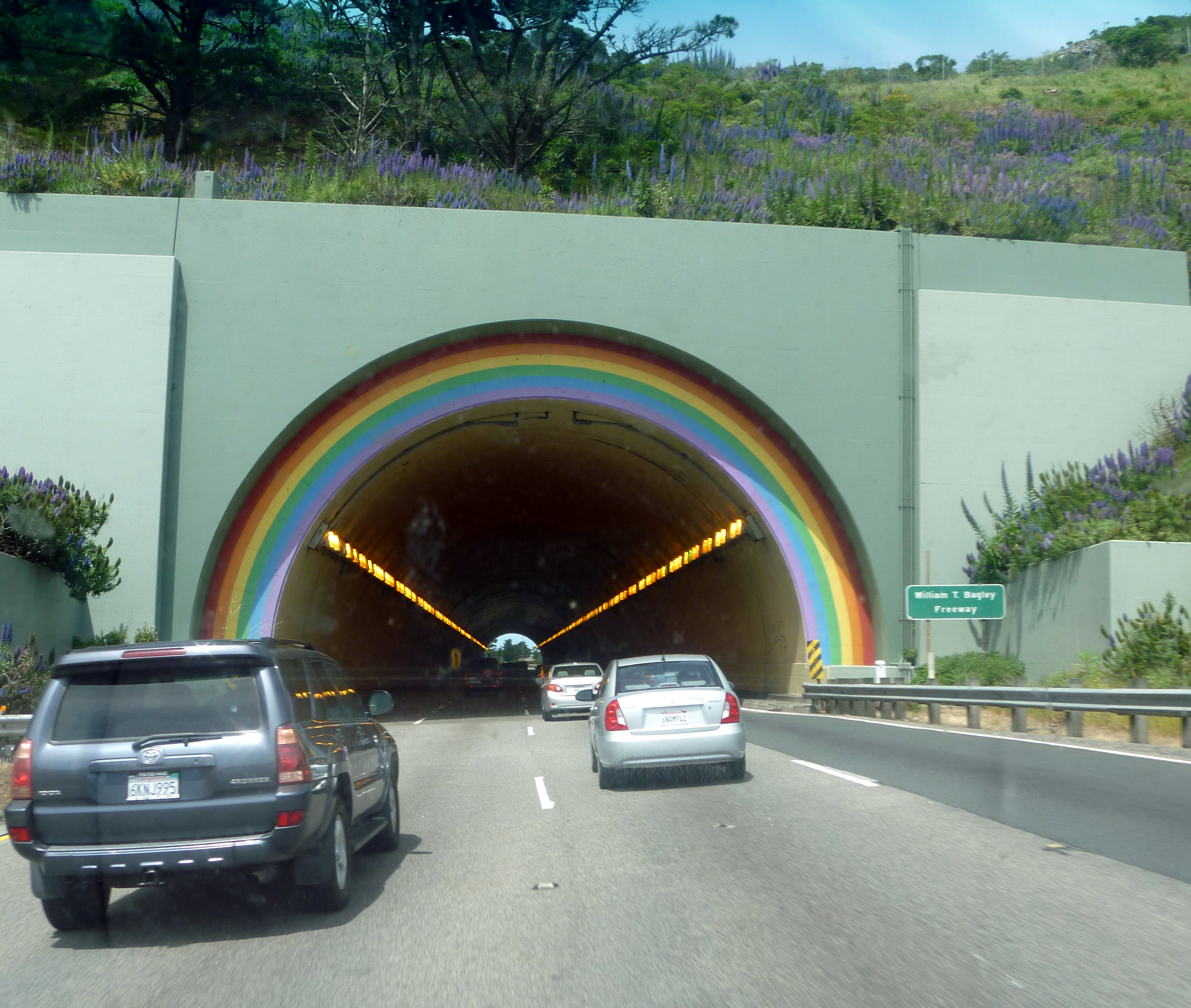
Robin Williams Tunnel, southern portal

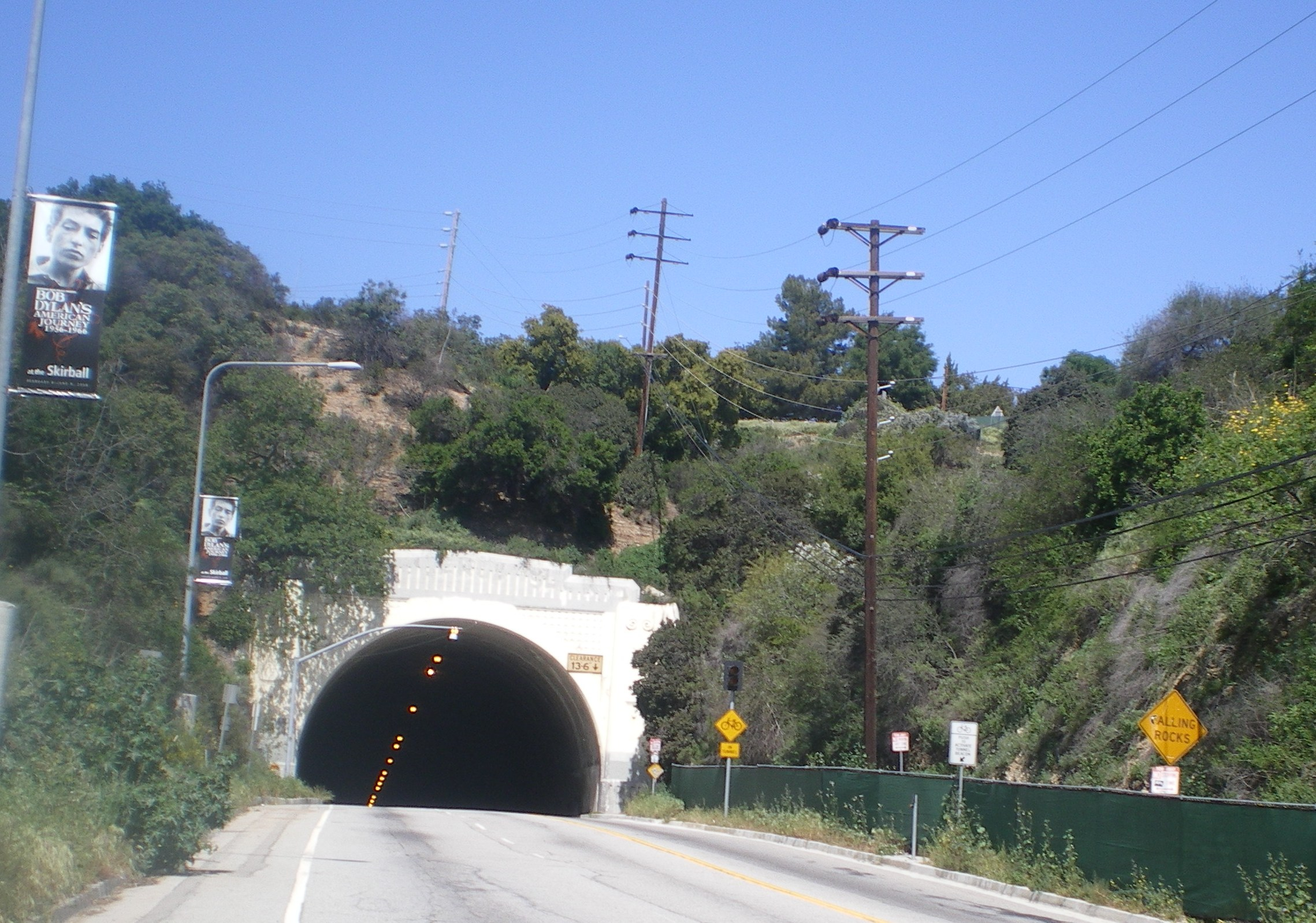
Sepulveda Boulevard Tunnel

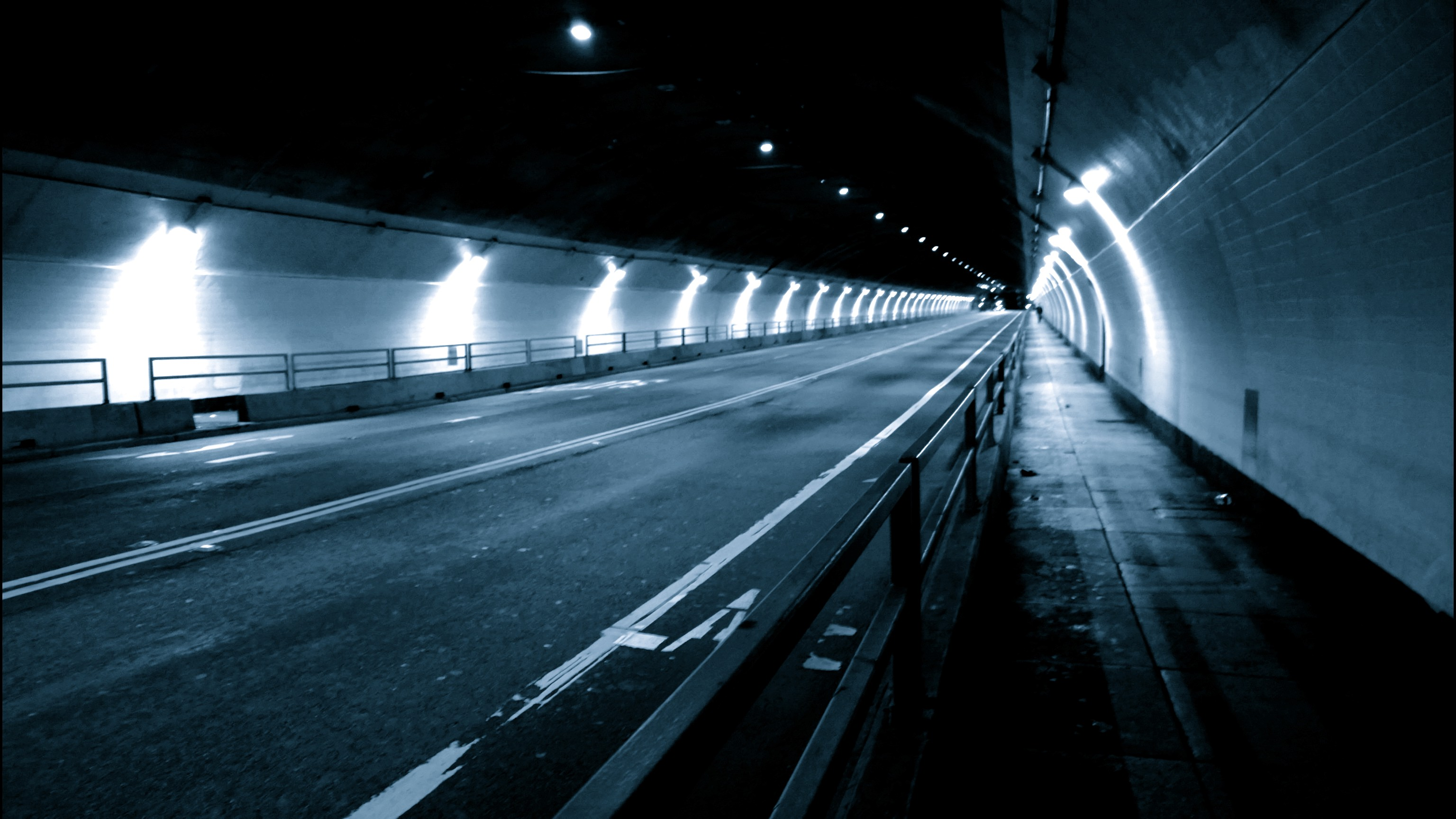
Stockton Street Tunnel

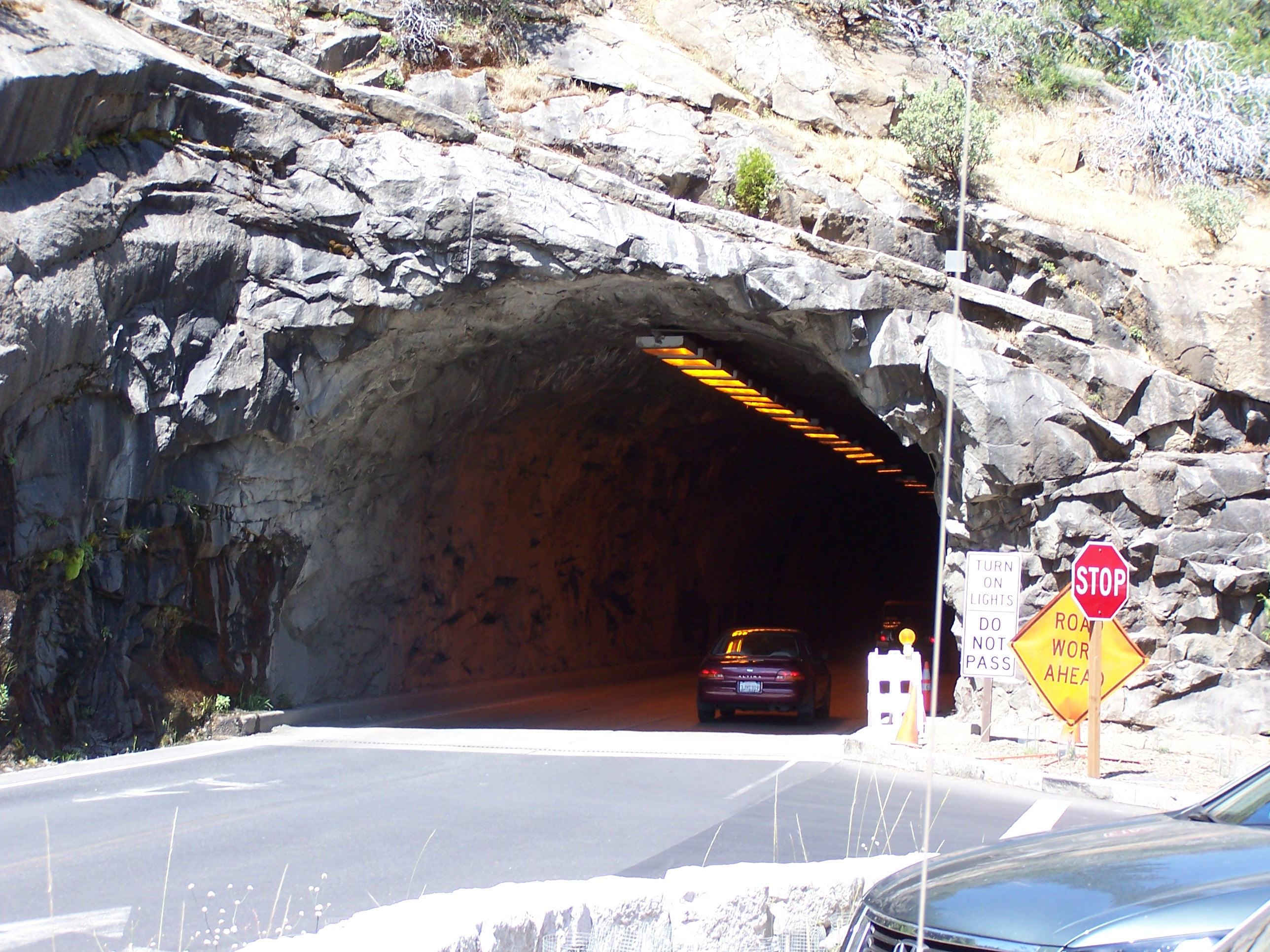
Wawona Tunnel

- Collier Tunnel, Redwood Highway (US 199), Del Norte County
- Dornan Tunnel, carrying Gerrard Avenue in Point Richmond parallel to the rail tunnel
- Escondido Freeway (SR 15), cut-and-cover tunnel between Polk and Orange Avenues in East San Diego (Teralta Park covers the freeway)
- Feather River Highway (SR-70), three tunnels, Feather River Canyon (west to east):
  - Arch Rock Tunnel
  - Grizzly Dome Tunnel
  - Elephant Butte Tunnel
- Gaviota Tunnel, northbound US 101, Santa Barbara County
- Harry Crabb Tunnel, ramp to eastbound Interstate 80 (Alan S. Hart Freeway) from northbound Sunrise Avenue (south of Douglas Boulevard) in Roseville
- John F. Foran Freeway (I-280), (southbound only) at its interchange with the 19th Avenue (SR 1) in Daly City
- Lighthouse Avenue Tunnel, Monterey
- Tom Lantos Tunnels/Devil's Slide Tunnels, twin tunnels, SR 1 beneath Devil's Slide between Pacifica and Montara
- Tunnels to Nowhere, two tunnels, Shoemaker Canyon Road (unpaved), San Gabriel Mountains
- Big Oak Flat Road, three tunnels, Yosemite National Park
- Wawona Tunnel, Wawona Road (SR 41), Yosemite National Park, the longest road tunnel in California at 4,233 feet (1,290 m)

=== Alameda County ===
- 11th Street Tunnel, under the Oakland Museum of California in Oakland
- Caldecott Tunnel, quad tunnels, SR 24 beneath Grizzly Peak between Orinda and Oakland
- Northbrae Tunnel, former East Bay Electric Lines rail tunnel, current road tunnel joining Solano Avenue and Sutter Street beneath Marin Circle, Berkeley
- Posey and Webster Street Tubes, twin immersed tubes, SR 61 beneath the Oakland Estuary between Alameda and Oakland

=== Los Angeles County ===
- Airport Tunnel, twin tunnels, Sepulveda Boulevard (SR 1) beneath Runways 7L/25R and 7R/25L at Los Angeles International Airport, Los Angeles
- Angeles Crest Highway (State Route 2), two tunnels in the San Gabriel Mountains National Monument northeast Los Angeles County between La Cañada Flintridge and Wrightwood
- Angeles Forest Highway Tunnel/Singing Springs Tunnel/Hidden Springs Tunnel, Angeles Forest Highway/County Road N3, San Gabriel Mountains National Monument, north Los Angeles County between La Cañada Flintridge and Palmdale
- Broadway Tunnel extended Broadway further north, later demolished
- Kanan Dume Tunnel, twin tunnels on Kanan Dume Road north of Malibu
- Malibu Canyon Tunnel, Malibu Canyon Road north of Malibu
- Figueroa Street Tunnels, northbound Arroyo Seco Parkway (SR 110), four tunnels beneath Elysian Park, Los Angeles
- Foothill Freeway (I-210)
  - Cut-and-cover tunnel between Glendale Freeway and Angeles Crest Highway (both part of State Highway 2) in La Cañada Flintridge (Memorial Park covers the freeway)
  - Two short tunnels (eastbound only) under SR 710 and Ventura Freeway (SR 134) in Pasadena
- Griffith Park Tunnel, Vermont Canyon Road/Mount Hollywood Drive in Griffith Park, Los Angeles (tunnel to fictional Toontown in Who Framed Roger Rabbit)
- Long Beach Airport tunnels, two sets of twin tunnels for Lakewood Boulevard (SR 19) and Spring Street under runway 12/30 at Long Beach Airport, Long Beach
- McClure Tunnel, SR 1 located at the western terminus of I-10 in Santa Monica
- Mount Baldy Road, two tunnels, north of Claremont
- Newhall Pass Tunnels, two tunnels about 550 feet (170 m) each, southbound truck bypass lanes of the Golden State Freeway (I‑5), in Santa Clarita and Los Angeles
- Orange Freeway (SR 57), (northbound only) at its interchange with the Pomona Freeway (SR 60) in Diamond Bar
- Santa Ana Freeway portion of US 101 (northbound only), at its interchange with the San Bernardino Freeway (SR 10) in downtown Los Angeles
- Second Street Tunnel, beneath Bunker Hill, downtown Los Angeles (tunnel from the movie Blade Runner)
- Tunnel on Soledad Canyon Road, east of Santa Clarita (tunnel from the movie Duel)
- Third Street Tunnel, beneath Bunker Hill, downtown Los Angeles
- Sepulveda Boulevard Tunnel, Sepulveda Boulevard under Mulholland Drive at the north end of Sepulveda Pass, Los Angeles
- Van Nuys Airport Tunnel, twin tunnels, Sherman Way under runway 16R/34L at Van Nuys Airport, west San Fernando Valley, Los Angeles

=== Marin County ===
- Baker-Barry Tunnel, single lane tunnel, Bunker Rd, Sausalito
- Robin Williams Tunnel/Waldo Tunnel, twin tunnels, US 101 and SR 1, Sausalito

=== Orange County ===
- Main Street under the Santa Ana Freeway (I‑5) in Tustin, California
- SR 133 segment of the Eastern Transportation Corridor toll road, (northbound only) at its interchange with the SR 241 (Foothill Transportation Corridor) in Irvine
- SR 261 segment of the Eastern Transportation Corridor toll road, (northbound only) at its interchange with the SR 241 (Eastern Transportation Corridor) in Orange

=== San Francisco ===
- Broadway Tunnel, twin tunnels, Broadway beneath Russian Hill
- MacArthur Tunnel, SR 1 beneath the Presidio of San Francisco (Golden Gate National Recreation Area)
- Masonic Tunnel, carrying Geary Boulevard under Masonic Avenue
- Presidio Parkway, US 101 through the Presidio of San Francisco (replacement for the elevated Doyle Drive)
- Stockton Street Tunnel, beneath a portion of Chinatown
- Yerba Buena Tunnel, twin tunnels, I-80 near the middle of the San Francisco–Oakland Bay Bridge complex, Yerba Buena Island

=== Abandoned ===
- Kennedy Tunnel, former road above the extant Caldecott Tunnel (see above)

== Utility ==
- Angeles Tunnel
- Claremont Tunnel
- Hetch Hetchy Coast Range tunnel
- (three) Inland Feeder
  - Arrowhead West Tunnel
  - Arrowhead East Tunnel
  - Riverside Badlands Tunnel
- Mile Rock
- San Jacinto Tunnel
- South Bay Aqueduct
- Trinity Diversion Tunnel: a 10.7-mile (17.2 km) tunnel diverting water from the Trinity Basin to the Sacramento Valley.

== Mining ==
- Burro Schmidt Tunnel, mining tunnel, east of Red Rock Canyon State Park, eastern Kern County

== Military and Industry ==
- SpaceX constructed a 1.4-mile (2.3 km) test tunnel underneath the parking lot of its Hawthorne plant for experimental transportation technology.
- United States Airforce Plant 42 in Palmdale is rumored to have an underground network of tunnels connecting to nearby defense plants including Lockheed's Skunk works.
- Fort McArthur Tunnel Complex: an abandoned World War II network connecting fortifications in San Pedro.
- The Lawson Adit is a tunnel constructed underneath UC Berkeley into the Berkeley Hills in the early 1900s for student mining research.
- US Dept. of Defense Tunnel Warfare Center, China Lake
- The Stanford Linear Accelerator operates in a 10,000-foot (3,000 m) concrete tunnel, 25 feet (7.6 m) underground.
- Vandenberg Space Force Base has a number of underground tunnels to support rocket-launch operations.

== See also ==
- List of tunnels in the United States
