= Laguna Creek watershed =

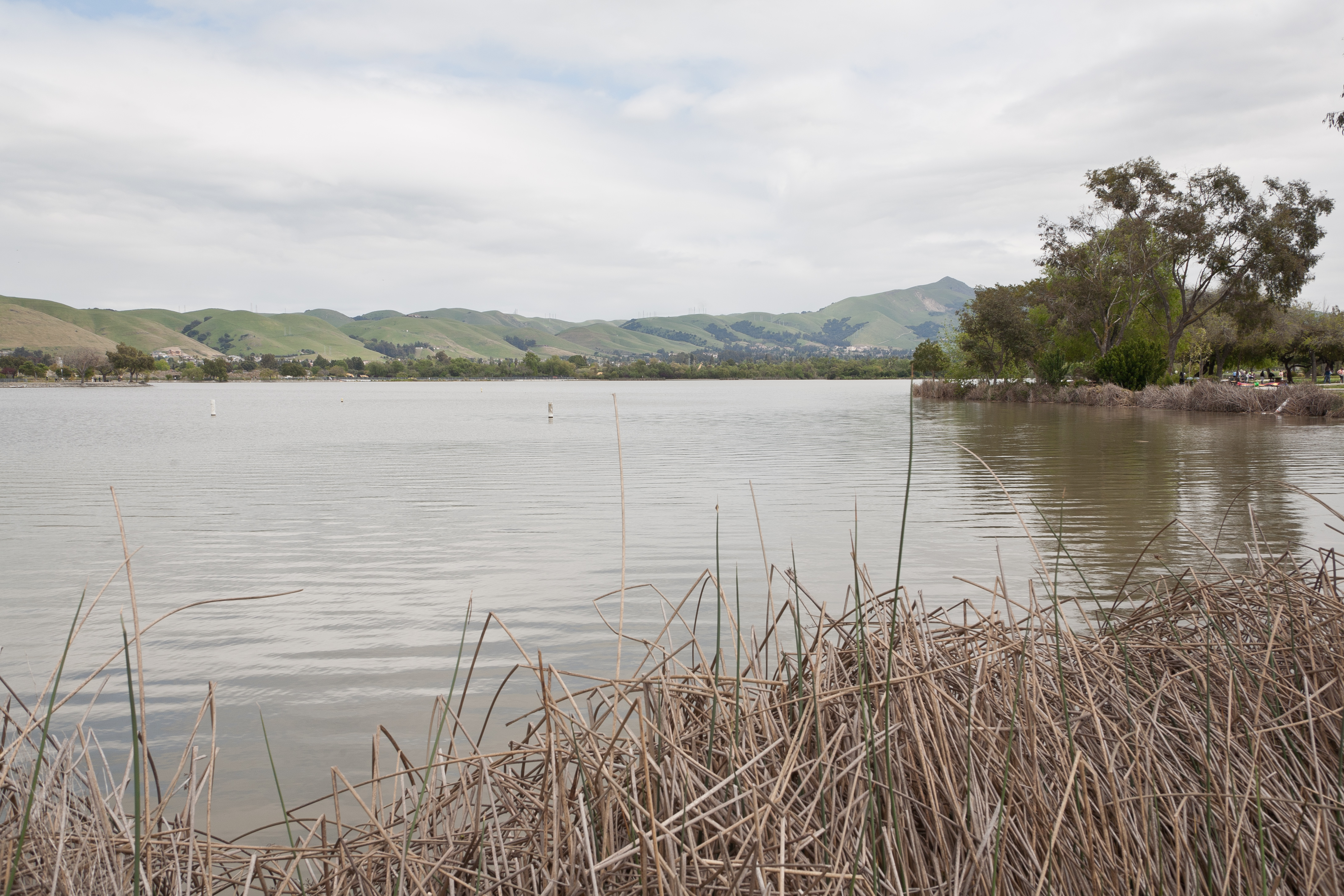
- Lake Elizabeth (Fremont, California)

Location
- Country: United States
- State: California
- Region: Alameda County

Physical characteristics
- Source
  - coordinates: 37.52615121410835°N 121.90883531017474°W
- Mouth: San Francisco Bay
  - elevation: 0 ft (0 m)

The Laguna Creek watershed consists of 25.1 square miles (100 km^{2}) of land within northern California's Alameda County. The watershed drains the foothills of the Diablo Range south of Niles Canyon. To the southeast, the area of Mission Peak Regional Preserve around Mission Peak is included. Agua Caliente, Canada del Aliso, Mission, Morrison, Sabercat, Vargas, and Washington creeks drain the area of the watershed. They drain into Laguna Creek and eventually Mud Slough.

Water from winter and spring storms feed the creeks and the watershed. Natural springs along Mission Peak are also a source of water. Many of the creeks are dry when there is no rain.

== Background ==
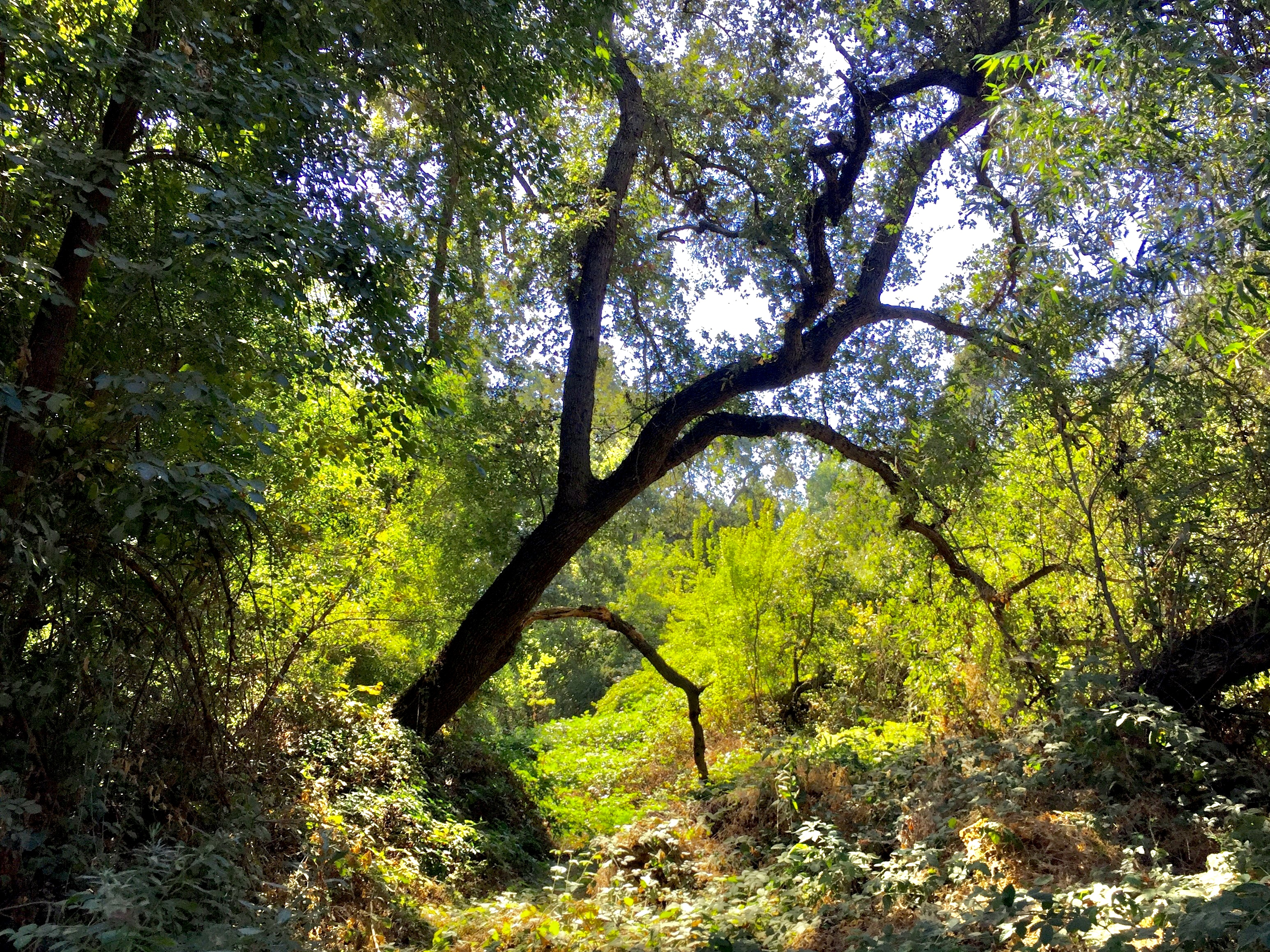
Valley Oak

Morrison Creek and Mission Creek meet just before Mission Creek flows into Lake Elizabeth on the lake's southern shore. Much of what is now the Fremont Central Park was once the Stivers Lagoon. Water leaving the park divides between Laguna Creek and Irvington Creek. Irvington Creek is also known as Line G, or the Laguna Creek bypass flood control channel.

At the time of the Spanish settlement and the construction of Mission San José, groundwater was still readily available through the porous sandstone in the area. Development of water systems, and later residential and industrial development drained the water table, depleting the underground springs and leaving ground water sources only in areas close to the creeks.

Prior to settlement, the area was filled with wildlife. Sabercat Creek derives its name from pre-historic fossils found in that area. The watershed still has many of the plants and trees native to the area, including valley oak, Frémont's cottonwood, and California sycamore.

Mud Slough debouches into the San Francisco Bay near the site of the ghost town of Drawbridge. Its proximity to the bay means its marshy end is affected by tidal action. It goes from freshwater, to brackish to saline. The slough passes the salt evaporation ponds made by the Leslie Salt Company, where it joins the larger Coyote Creek and the bay.

Laguna Creek is the site of several flood control projects.

== See also ==
- List of watercourses in the San Francisco Bay Area
- Don Edwards San Francisco Bay National Wildlife Refuge
