= Aqua Adventure =

Waterpark located in Fremont, CA

- Interactive map of Aqua Adventure
- Location: Fremont, California, United States
- Coordinates: 37.54394°N 121.9609°W
- Opened: May 23, 2009; 17 years ago
- Website: Official Website

Aqua Adventure is a water park located in Central Park in Fremont, California.

== History ==
In 2001, the City Council approved a project to utilize the site of the Puerto Penasco Swim Lagoon into a modern, family-oriented water play facility that would serve both the residents of Fremont as well as the surrounding region. The Family Water Play Facility (also known as the "Water Park") was proposed to be developed on approximately four of the seven acres of the site, which had provided water-oriented recreation to the citizens of Fremont for 32 years prior to closing in 2001. The Water Park would be focused on family fun.

Construction was completed in early 2009 and was open to the general public on the Memorial Day weekend in May 2009.

== Facilities ==
Currently, there are two open and two enclosed slides that twist and turn from a height of 40 feet (12 m) above pools and slide-stopping water gates called run-outs. A 700-square-foot (65 m^{2}), 3-foot-deep (0.91 m) lazy river surrounds much of the complex, while a splash zone of water features water jets and sprays.

In addition, the 25-yard long Oasis Pool is five lanes wide and functions as a swimming and exercise venue. A zero depth entry to the water course and a water bucket spray area has a depth of only one foot of water. Fremont Director of Parks and Recreation, Annabell Holland noted, "The deepest section of the entire park is four feet in the middle of the utility (lap) pool." Twelve shade structures will provide relief from the sun on hot days.

Locker rooms, concession stands, food service, picnic areas, offices and other park amenities are available for use.

Guests are not allowed to bring food into the park, but food shops are provided. Wristbands facilitate multiple entries such that entrance and re-entrance can be permitted. Groups that would like to reserve Aqua Adventure for private functions have an opportunity to do so.

== Additional programs ==
Aqua Adventure also holds swim lessons and Junior Lifeguard camps during its summer operating hours. Swim lessons are offered in both the morning and evening in 2-week long sessions that run Monday-Thursday. Private lessons are available, along with Saturday morning sessions. Jr. Lifeguard camps are held approximately 3 times a summer, with emphasis on introducing campers to the basics of being a professional lifeguard. CPR, rescue breathing, shallow water rescues, and first aid are among the topics covered in this week-long course.

Lap swim has most recently been held in the afternoon after the park closes for the day, alongside swim lessons in the Oasis Pool, Monday-Thursday. Lap swim is also offered Saturday mornings.

== See also ==
- List of waterparks
- Recreation in Fremont, California
