= Cuesta Pass =

Mountain pass in San Luis Obispo County, California, United States

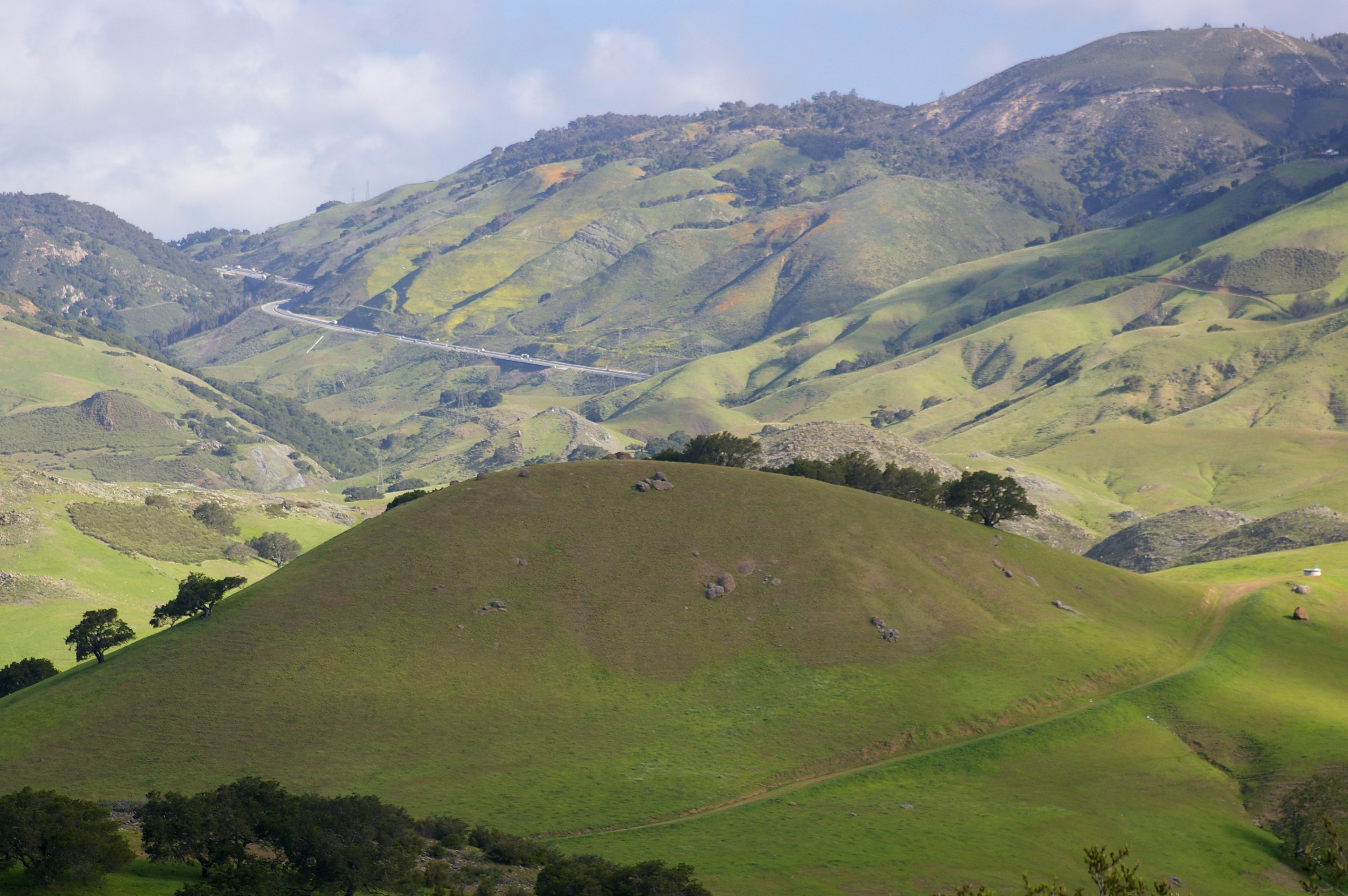
- Cuesta Pass from Reservoir Canyon south of the pass, with U.S. 101 visible in the upper left
- Interactive map of Cuesta Pass
- Elevation: 1,522 feet (464 m)
- Traversed by: U.S. Route 101; Coast Line (Union Pacific RR)

Third Approach
- Location: San Luis Obispo County, California
- Range: Santa Lucia Range
- Coordinates: 35.3488°N 120.6313°W

Cuesta Pass or La Cuesta Pass (Spanish for "the slope"), colloquially referred to as simply the grade, is a low mountain pass in San Luis Obispo County on California's Central Coast. It crosses the southern Santa Lucia Range at an altitude of 1,522 feet (464 m), and connects San Luis Obispo, roughly 5 miles (8.0 km) to the south, with Atascadero, Paso Robles, and the Salinas Valley to the north. It is traversed by U.S. Route 101 and the Coast Line of the Union Pacific Railroad, and is better known for the long slope up to the pass from San Luis Obispo, in the canyon of San Luis Obispo Creek, which is redundantly named the "Cuesta Grade".

The railroad line through the pass includes a segment with a 2.2% grade, the steepest point of the coast line between Los Angeles and San Francisco. It traverses six tunnels, including one at an altitude of 1,380 feet (420 m) bypassing the summit of the pass.

== History ==
The pass was long used by indigenous people, and lies on the boundary between the historical homelands of the Northern Chumash, to the south of the pass, and Salinans, to the north. Sources disagree on whether the Portolá expedition in 1769–1770 crossed the pass or found it impassible; however, soon afterwards, it was crossed by two expeditions led by Juan Bautista de Anza in 1774 and 1775–1776. It later became part of El Camino Real connecting the Spanish missions of California. Although stagecoach traffic used the trail from the 1840s, it remained rough, and passengers were advised to get out and walk in the steepest parts. In 1876 the city of San Luis Obispo funded the construction of an improved and smoother stagecoach road across the pass.

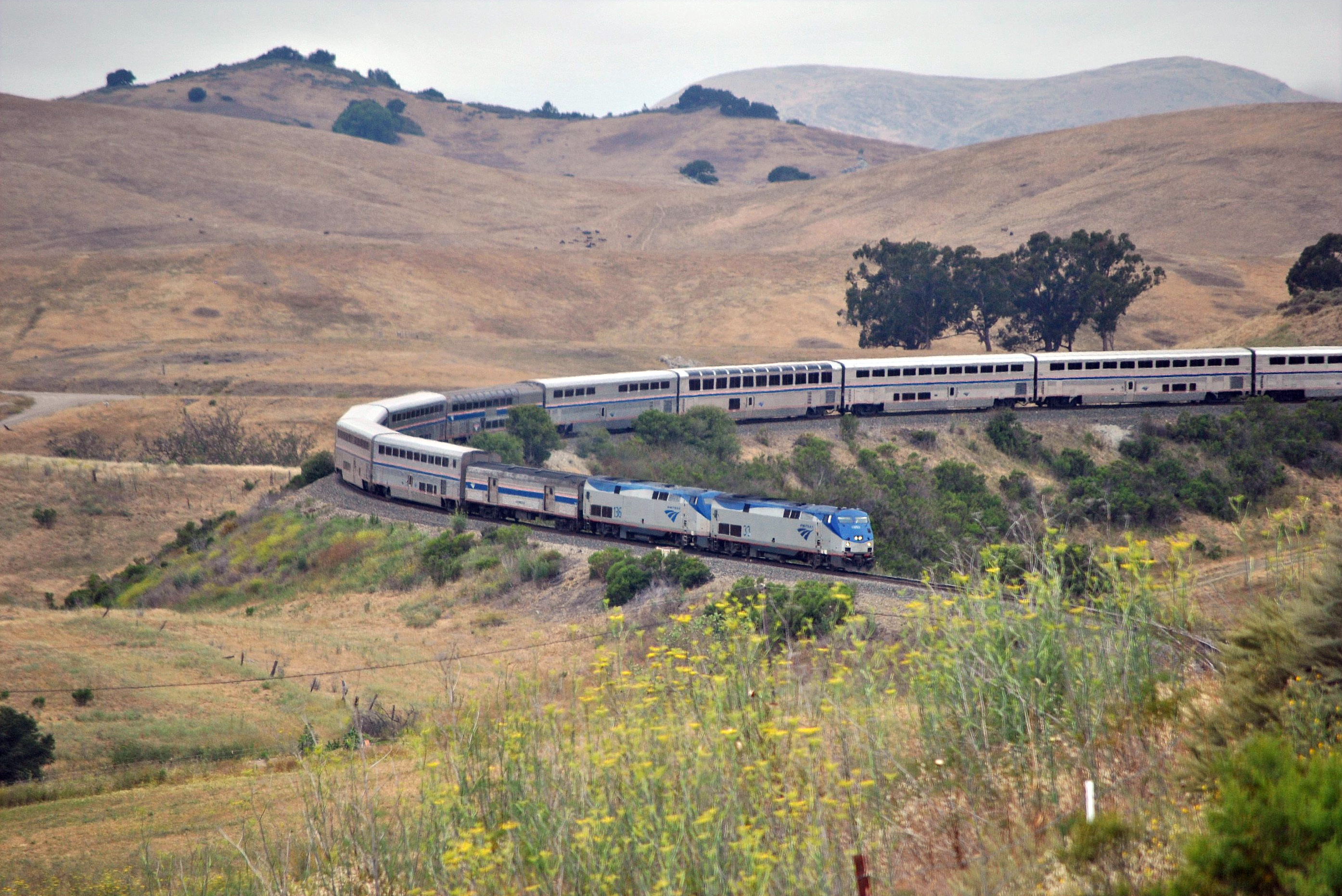
Southbound Coast Starlight at Horseshoe Curve, on the lower Cuesta Grade

The Southern Pacific Railroad line from San Francisco south through the Salinas Valley reached Santa Margarita, near the top of the pass, in 1889, and a continuation of the line over the pass, connecting to San Luis Obispo, was completed in 1894. The construction of its original seven tunnels included the removal of a record 1.1 million cubic yards (0.84×10^{6} m^{3}) of hand-drilled rock. One of the tunnels caved in, and was bypassed, in 1910. The tunnels were widened and reinforced with concrete in a long piecemeal process from 1940 to 1960. A fire in the summit tunnel in 1987 led to additional relining. In 1996, the Southern Pacific Railroad merged into the Union Pacific Railroad.

In 1914 the former route of the road from San Luis Obispo to the pass, on the west side of the canyon, was realigned to the bottom of the canyon, and widened to a full two-lane road. It was repaved in concrete in 1923, and named as part of U.S. Route 101 in 1926. In 1938, the highway was realigned again, to the east side of the canyon, and widened to four lanes; portions of the two older alignments can still be found. Another widening was made in 2004.
