= Alto tunnel =

Tunnel in California

Alto Tunnel
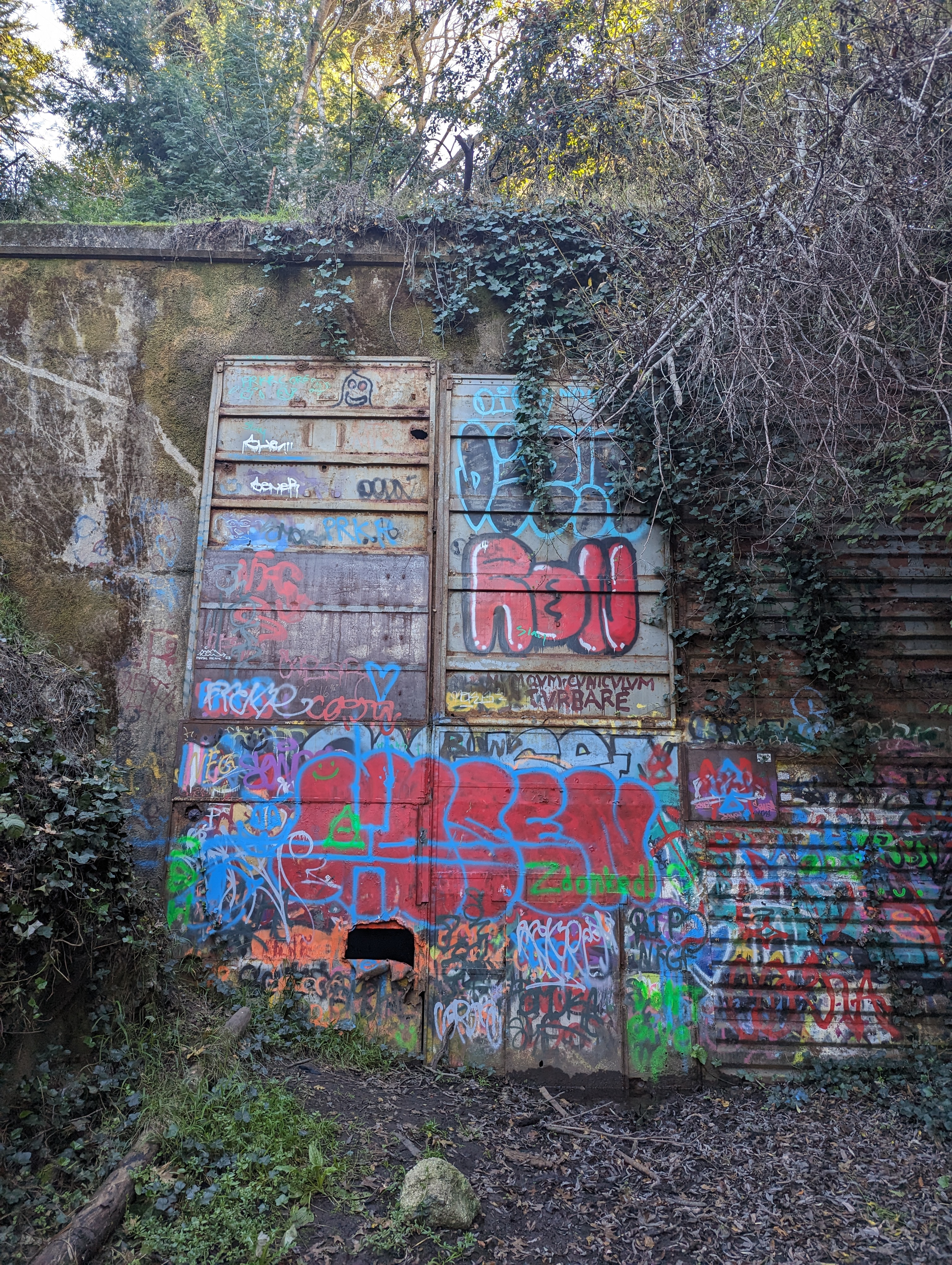
- The north portal of the tunnel in 2023
- Interactive map of Alto Tunnel

Overview
- Line: Corte Madera-Sausalito Line
- Location: Marin County, California
- Coordinates: 37.91954°N 122.52709°W (north portal); 37.91411°N 122.52403°W (south portal)
- Status: Unsafe, sealed
- System: Northwestern Pacific Railroad
- Crosses: Camino Alto
- Start: Corte Madera, California (north)
- End: Mill Valley, California (south)

Operation
- Opened: April 1884
- Closed: November 1971
- Traffic: Railway
- Character: Passenger and freight

Technical
- Length: 2,173 feet (662 m)
- No. of tracks: 1 single-track
- Track gauge: Narrow-gauge
- Tunnel clearance: 20 feet (6.1 m)
- Width: 16 feet (4.9 m)

The Alto tunnel is a disused railway tunnel in Marin County, California that connects the towns of Mill Valley and Corte Madera. It was built in 1884 by the Northwestern Pacific Railroad as part of the Corte Madera-Sausalito line. The tunnel is narrow-gauge and single tracked, with a length of 2,173 feet (662 m) and a cross section 16 feet (4.9 m) wide by 20 feet (6.1 m) high.

== History ==
=== Operation ===
The Alto tunnel was built in 1884 to connect Mill Valley and Corte Madera as part of the Corte Madera-Sausalito line, which connected the docks in Sausalito with the cities to the north. The tunnel began operation in April of the same year. In 1929, the Southern Pacific Railroad became the sole owner of the tunnel. Passenger service through the tunnel ceased in 1940 with the decline of the Northwestern Pacific interurban system, although freight traffic still continued along the line. In 1971, rail traffic in the tunnel ceased altogether with the final train being run through on November 23, 1971 and the tunnel was shut down.

=== Closure ===
Following the closure, two heavy bulkheads were installed at the tunnel portals to prevent entry. One year later, the Golden Gate Transit District attempted to purchase the entire line, including the Alto tunnel for use as a commuter rail line. The purchase was shut down due to local worries, specifically in relation to noise and safety. Then in the late 1970s, the County of Marin purchased an additional part of the right of way from Southern Pacific, but left the Alto Tunnel in their hands.

In 1975, a 124 feet (38 m) long concrete plug was installed in the tunnel to address stability concerns. Southern Pacific officially sealed the tunnel in 1979. Two years later, part of the tunnel collapsed, destroying a house and multiple underground utilities in the process. As a result, 400 feet (120 m) of the tunnel was filled with concrete and gravel to further improve stability and safety.

=== Viability as a bike path ===
In 1994, the Marin County Department of Parks and Open Space made the decision to hire Brady and Associates to assess the tunnel's viability as a bike path. Multiple feasibility studies were carried out, notably in 2001, 2008, and 2010, the most recent of which produced a rehabilitation cost estimate based on the project costs of the Cal Park Hill Tunnel rehabilitation. In addition to providing cost estimates, the 2010 study estimated tunnel use figures. The study concluded that the tunnel would have 850,000-1,850,000 annual users.

The rehabilitation and permanent closure cost estimates were refined in 2016-2017. The 2016-2017 study, which totaled a cost of $646,000 despite an estimated cost of $558,620, quoted a base case cost of 46.8 million dollars, with a best to worst case range of 42.1-50.5 million dollars for rehabilitation. The total estimated product cost of filling and closure was estimated at 8.5 million dollars, with an estimated annual maintenance cost of 308,000 dollars.

Multiple organizations, namely the Friends of Alto Tunnel organization have been petitioning for the tunnel's reopening.

== Structure ==
The original tunnel supports were made of redwood timber, specifically 10in by 14in sets in a 7-segment configuration spaced 1–5 ft apart. As their condition got worse, they were replaced by 5-segment sets of similar dimensions. The tunnel has a concrete portal barrel with a length of 30.9 feet (9.4 m) located at the north portal.

The tunnel was dug through rock of the Franciscan group, consisting mainly of sandstone, conglomerates, and shales.

As it stands, the southern part of the tunnel is in a significantly worse state than the northern part. The geology in the southern half is generally weaker, stronger supports were needed during initial construction of the tunnel, and the southern half has been the location of many collapses and other accidents. The 2017 investigation revealed that most of the southern half of the tunnel was flooded with rubble.
