= Lake Elizabeth (Fremont, California) =

Artificial lake in the East Bay

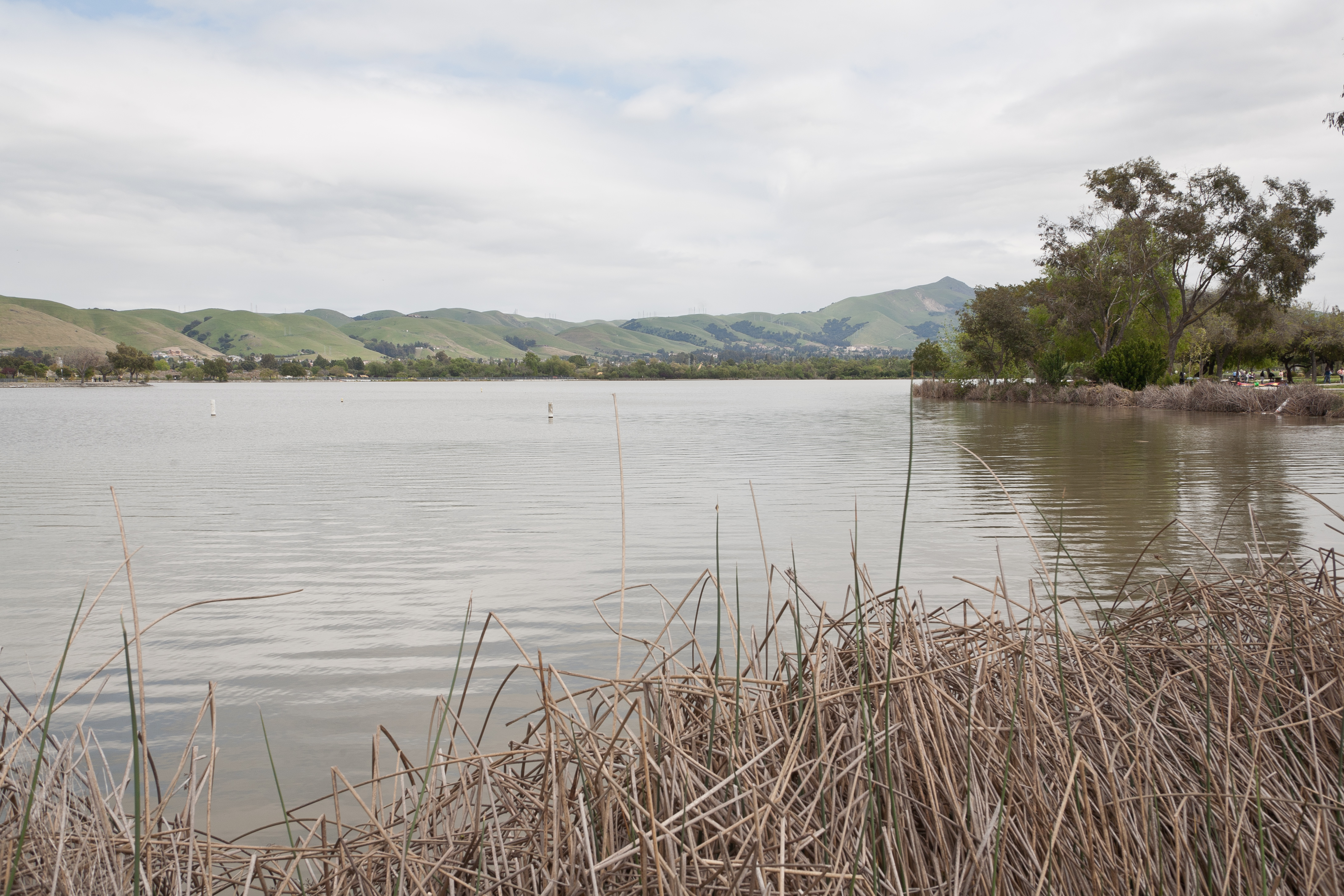
- Lake Elizabeth, with reeds in the foreground and mountains in the background.

- Location within California
- Location: Fremont, California
- Coordinates: 37°32′55″N 121°57′44″W
- Type: Reservoir
- Surface area: 83 acres (34 ha)
- Max. depth: 7 feet (2.1 m)
- Water volume: 580 acre-feet (720,000 m^{3})
- Frozen: Never
- Islands: Duck Island

Lake Elizabeth, located in Central Park of Fremont, California, is a man-made 83-acre (34 ha) lake with a 2-mile (3.2 km) walkway around the lake. When at average capacity, water rises to a depth of about 7 feet (2.1 m).

== About ==
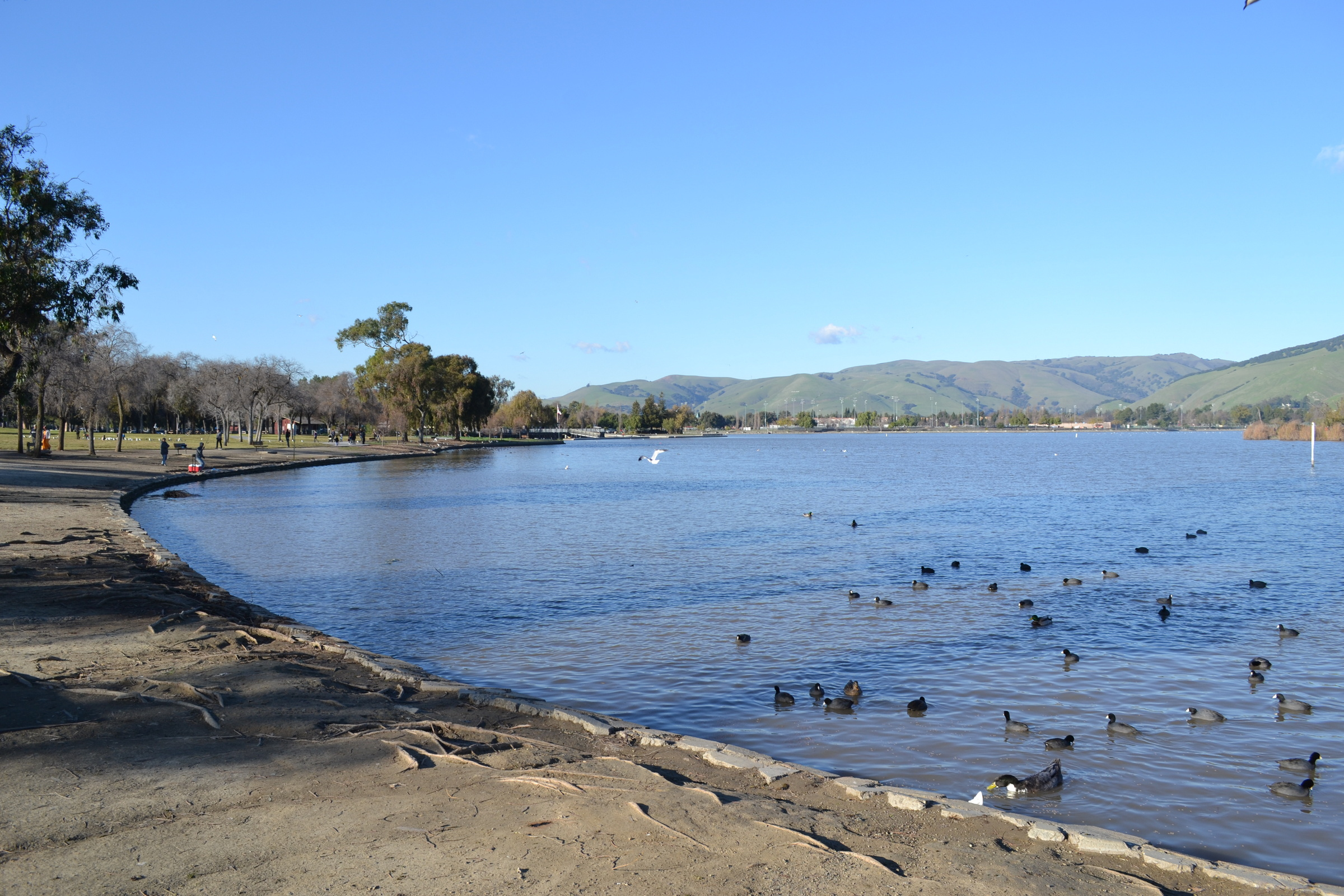
Another view of the lake

Lake Elizabeth was named when it and the surrounding Central Park were dedicated to Fremont's sister city, Elizabeth, South Australia, on March 22, 1969. Central Park and Lake Elizabeth began development in 1960.

Central Park and the lake are visited by hundreds of people every day, and the lake is commonly used for boating and other recreational activities too. The park is home to a large number of birds such as American coots, mallards, gulls, and also some very unusual birds who live near the small forest on the northern side of the park or on the small island (often called Duck Island), inaccessible to land-bound visitors, in the center of the lake. Many people come to bicycle or jog around the lake's perimeter, and many families come for the two playgrounds in the park and the other three that it connects to by walkway. Many people also enjoy fishing at the lake, as it is free. Fishes that could be caught include sunfish, trout, catfish, and largemouth bass. The Aqua Adventure water park lies in Central Park on the southern shore of Lake Elizabeth.

== Hydrology ==
Lake Elizabeth has one island, named Duck Island, located in the eastern part of the lake. Mission Creek flows into Lake Elizabeth on the southern shore.

== Tunnel ==
As part of the Warm Springs BART expansion, a 1.25-mile (2.01 km) cut-and-cover tunnel was built across Fremont Central Park and under Lake Elizabeth at a cost of $137 million. Underground tracks are more expensive than surface tracks, but this lessens the impact of train operations on the park. Construction began in 2009, and was completed in 2012. The tunnel did not open for revenue service until March 2017.

== See also ==
- List of lakes in California
