= Drawbridge, California =

Ghost town in the San Francisco Bay

Drawbridge
- Ghost town
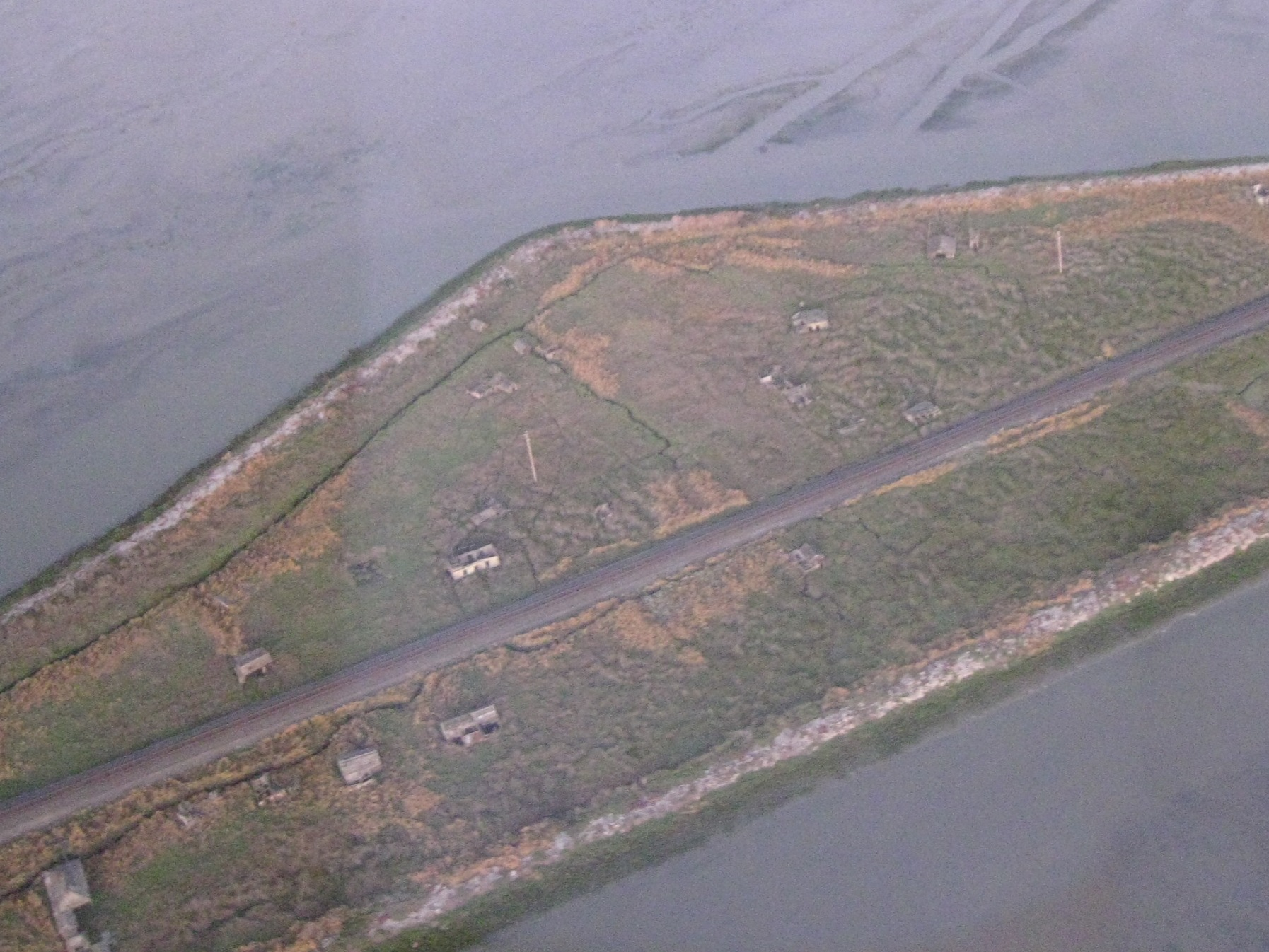
- Aerial image of Drawbridge

- Location in the San Francisco Bay Area
- Coordinates: 37°27′54″N 121°58′28″W
- Country: United States
- State: California
- County: Alameda
- City: Fremont
- Elevation: 6.6 ft (2 m)

Drawbridge (formerly Saline City) is a ghost town with an abandoned railroad station located at the southern end of the San Francisco Bay, next to Station Island, now a part of the city of Fremont, California, United States. It is located on the Union Pacific Railroad 6 miles (10 km) south of downtown Fremont, at an elevation of 7 feet (2 m). Formerly used as a hunting village, it has been a ghost town since 1975 and is slowly sinking into the marshlands. It is now part of the Don Edwards San Francisco Bay National Wildlife Refuge and is illegal to visit.

== History ==
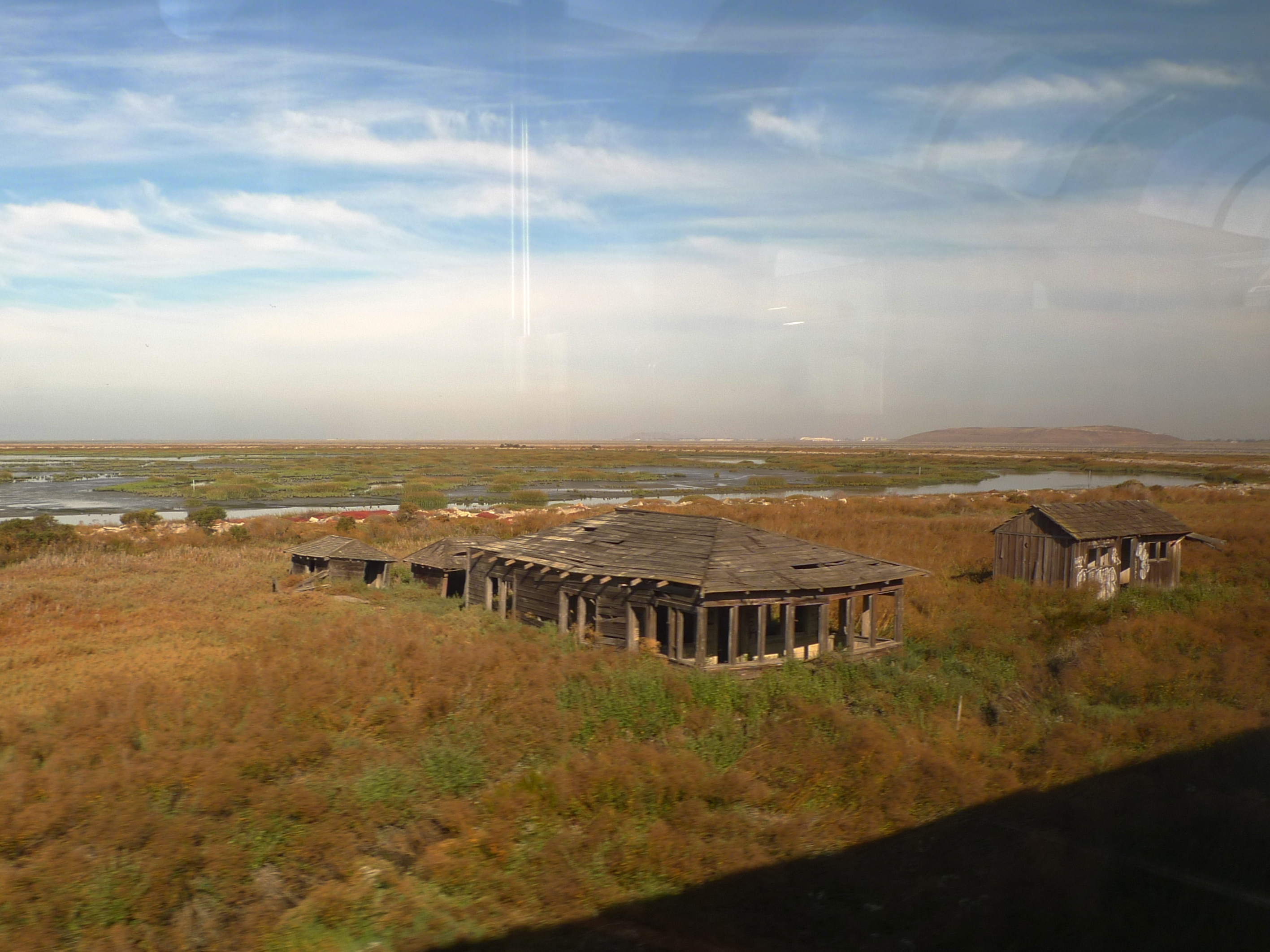
Abandoned buildings in Drawbridge in 2012

Drawbridge was created by the narrow-gauge South Pacific Coast Railroad on Station Island in 1876 and consisted of one small cabin for the operator of the railroad's two drawbridges crossing Mud Slough and Coyote Creek to connect Newark with Alviso and San Jose. At one time 10 passenger trains stopped there per day, five going north and five going south. The drawbridges were removed long ago. The only path leading into Drawbridge is the Union Pacific Railroad track.

In the 1880s, on weekends nearly 1,000 visitors flocked to the town. By the 1920s, although the town had no roads, it did have 90 buildings, and was divided into two neighborhoods: the predominantly Roman Catholic South Drawbridge, and the predominantly Protestant North Drawbridge.

After the drawbridges were removed and most of the residents had left, the San Jose Mercury News for years incorrectly reported that the town was a ghost town and that the residents left valuables behind. As a result, the people still living there had their homes vandalized. The town was observed to be abandoned by 1975, when no structures were inhabited, and none were habitable. Drawbridge is considered to be the San Francisco Bay Area's only ghost town. Drawbridge is now part of the Don Edwards San Francisco Bay National Wildlife Refuge and is no longer open to the public due to restoration efforts, though it can still briefly be viewed from Altamont Corridor Express, Capitol Corridor, and Coast Starlight trains.

== See also ==
- Lexington, California
- Patchen, California
- Wingo, California
