= Tunnel No. 6 (Coast Line) =

Tunnel Number 6
- Interactive map of Tunnel Number 6

Overview
- Other name: Summit Tunnel
- Line: UP Coast Subdivision
- Location: Santa Margarita, California
- Coordinates: 35°21′06″N 120°38′06″W
- Crosses: Cuesta Pass

Operation
- Constructed: 1893–1894
- Owner: Union Pacific Railroad
- Traffic: Freight and passenger trains

Technical
- Length: 3,610 ft (1,100 m)
- No. of tracks: 1
- Track gauge: 4 ft 8 1/2 in (1,435 mm) standard gauge
- Max elevation: 1,323 ft (403 m)

Tunnel Number 6, or the Summit Tunnel, is a railway tunnel between Santa Margarita, California and San Luis Obispo, California. It is the longest tunnel along the Union Pacific Railroad Coast Line at 3,610 feet (1.10 km) in length and is wide enough to carry a single track. The tunnel under the Cuesta Pass represents the highest point along the line at 1,323 feet (403 m) above sea level.

The tunnel was constructed between 1893 and 1894 by the Southern Pacific Railroad. It was enlarged between 1940 and 1959. One daily passenger train, the Coast Starlight, operates through the tunnel.
