= Franklin Tunnel =

Rail underpass in Contra Costa County, California

- Interactive map of Franklin Tunnel

Overview
- Line: Stockton Subdivision
- Location: Contra Costa County, California
- Coordinates: 37°59′48.1″N 122°10′48.8″W

Operation
- Constructed: concrete-lined
- Opened: 1900
- Rebuilt: 1907
- Owner: BNSF Railway
- Character: freight

Technical
- Design engineer: William Benson Storey
- Length: 5,680 feet (1.076 mi; 1.73 km)
- No. of tracks: single
- Track gauge: 4 ft 8 1/2 in (1,435 mm) standard gauge
- Tunnel clearance: 18 feet (5.5 m)
- Width: 13 feet (4.0 m)

Franklin Tunnel is a railway tunnel near Martinez, California. It carries the BNSF Railway Stockton Subdivision under the Briones Hills between Glen Frazer and the railroad's approach to the San Francisco Bay. It was built by the San Francisco and San Joaquin Valley Railroad just prior to the company's acquisition by the Atchison, Topeka and Santa Fe Railway. It opened for service in 1900 as the company's longest tunnel.

The tunnel is 5,680 feet (1.076 mi; 1.73 km) in length, with a maximum depth of 300 feet (91 m) below the summit. Its cross section is 18 feet (5.5 m) tall and 13 feet (4.0 m) wide, carrying a single track.

The tunnel was closed for several weeks in early 1907 as a persistent fire ate away at the supporting timbers, causing a cave-in.
