= Grizzly Peak (Berkeley Hills) =

Summit in California, United States

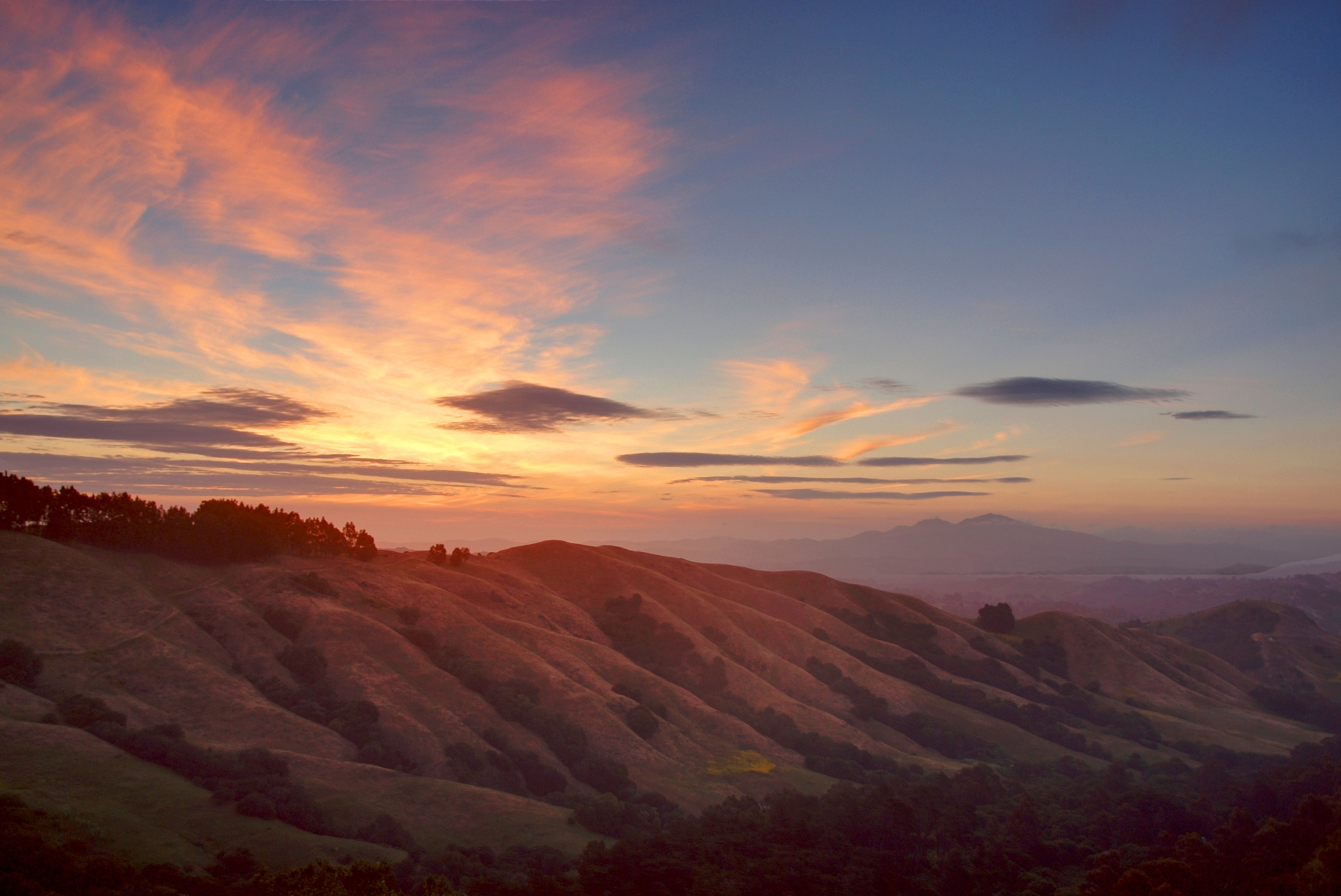
- Looking east from Grizzly Peak Boulevard with Mt. Diablo in the distance

Highest point
- Elevation: 1,758 ft (536 m) NAVD 88
- Prominence: 100 ft (30 m)
- Coordinates: 37°52′55″N 122°14′02″W

Geography
- Location within California
- Location: Alameda and Contra Costa counties, California, U.S.
- Parent range: Berkeley Hills
- Topo map: USGS Briones Valley

Grizzly Peak is a summit in the Berkeley Hills above Berkeley, California. The peak is located on the border between Alameda and Contra Costa counties, within the boundaries of Tilden Regional Park, and directly behind the University of California, Berkeley campus.

The peak was named for the California grizzly bear which inhabited the local area until the late 1800s. The last sighting locally was by a man who was reportedly killed by a grizzly in Strawberry Canyon below Grizzly Peak in the 1860s. The first local killing of a grizzly by a European occurred in 1772, also along Strawberry Creek just west of the location of the modern UC Berkeley campus within downtown Berkeley. The shooting by Spanish soldiers was recorded by Father Juan Crespi. The last grizzly in all of California was killed in the Sierra foothills east of Fresno in August 1922.

Grizzly Peak became more accessible in 1932 when Grizzly Peak Boulevard was constructed along the ridge line of the Berkeley Hills. The name was extended to the previously constructed ridge line stretch of Euclid Avenue to the north shortly thereafter. This portion was and remains a residential area of Berkeley while the original stretch is largely undeveloped. Grizzly Peak Boulevard extends from Kenyon Avenue in Kensington in the north, through Berkeley and Oakland to an intersection with Skyline Blvd. above Oakland to the south. Before Grizzly Peak Boulevard was constructed, the location of its intersection with Claremont (before 1892 known as Telegraph Road) and Fish Ranch Road was historically an important pass through the Berkeley Hills, before the tunnel that preceded Caldecott Tunnel was constructed through the hills in 1903; an inn and stage stop called the Summit House was located here. Grizzly Peak is a popular location for people to get a unique view of the Golden Gate Bridge and the surrounding Bay Area. It is also common to see street luge enthusiasts in this area and down the canyon into Berkeley from Skyline Boulevard and Claremont Avenue.

== See also ==
- List of summits of the San Francisco Bay Area
