= California Park, California =

Unincorporated community in California, United States

California Park is an unincorporated community in Marin County, California, United States, and a suburb of San Rafael. It lies north of San Quentin State Prison. Marin Sanitary Service is the largest tenant in the area.

The community is served by ZIP code 94901 and area codes 415 and 628.

== Cal Park Hill Tunnel ==
Cal Park Hill Tunnel
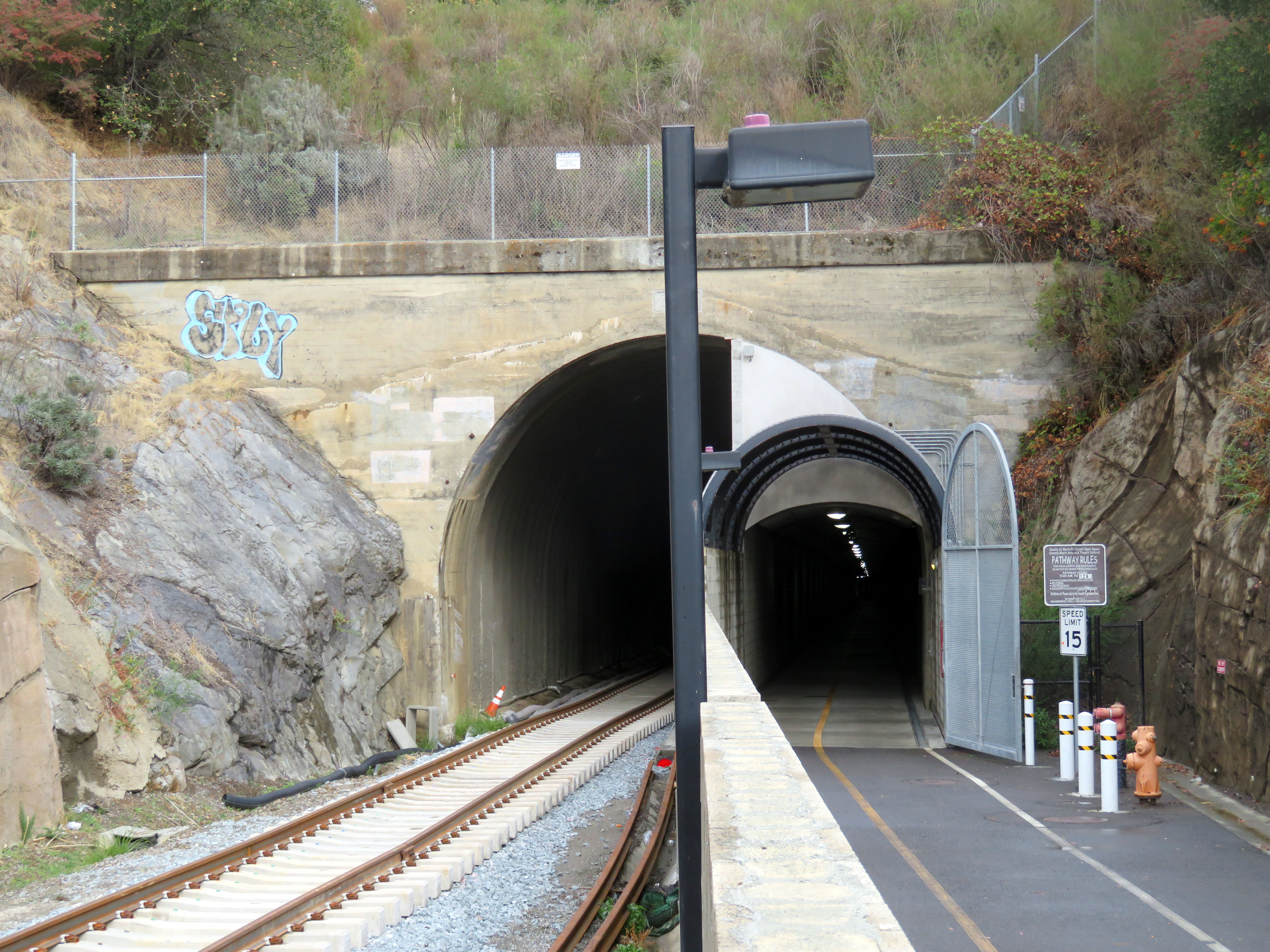
- Southern portal of the Cal Park Hill Tunnel, November 2018
- Interactive map of Cal Park Hill Tunnel

Overview
- Location: California Park, California
- Coordinates: 37°57′03″N 122°30′37″W
- Start: California Park
- End: Larkspur

Operation
- Opened: 1884
- Closed: c. 1960s
- Rebuilt: 1924
- Reopened: 2010 (pedestrian path); 2019 (rail)
- Owner: Sonoma–Marin Area Rail Transit
- Operator: Sonoma–Marin Area Rail Transit
- Character: single bore parallel rail/pedestrian pathway tunnel

Technical
- Length: 1,106 feet (337 m)
- No. of tracks: 1 (formerly 2)
- Track gauge: 4 ft 8 1/2 in (1,435 mm) standard gauge

The Cal Park Hill Tunnel runs for 1,106 feet (337 m) through the hill to Larkspur. It opened in 1884 and was a double-track train tunnel owned by Northwestern Pacific Railroad. Train service stopped in the 1960s. It is now owned by Sonoma–Marin Area Rail Transit (SMART). After a $27-million project, jointly funded by SMART and Marin County, half of the tunnel reopened on December 10, 2010, as a bicycle and pedestrian path. Sonoma–Marin Area Rail Transit uses the other half to connect the line from downtown San Rafael to the Larkspur Ferry Terminal. Originally estimated to cost $4 million, the tunnel was rehabilitated for pedestrian access at a cost of $28 million in 2010; additionally the rail line was extended from its temporary terminal at San Rafael Transit Center at a cost of $55.4 million.
