= Fremont Central Park =

Large public space in the East Bay

Coordinates: 37°33′0″N 121°57′50″W

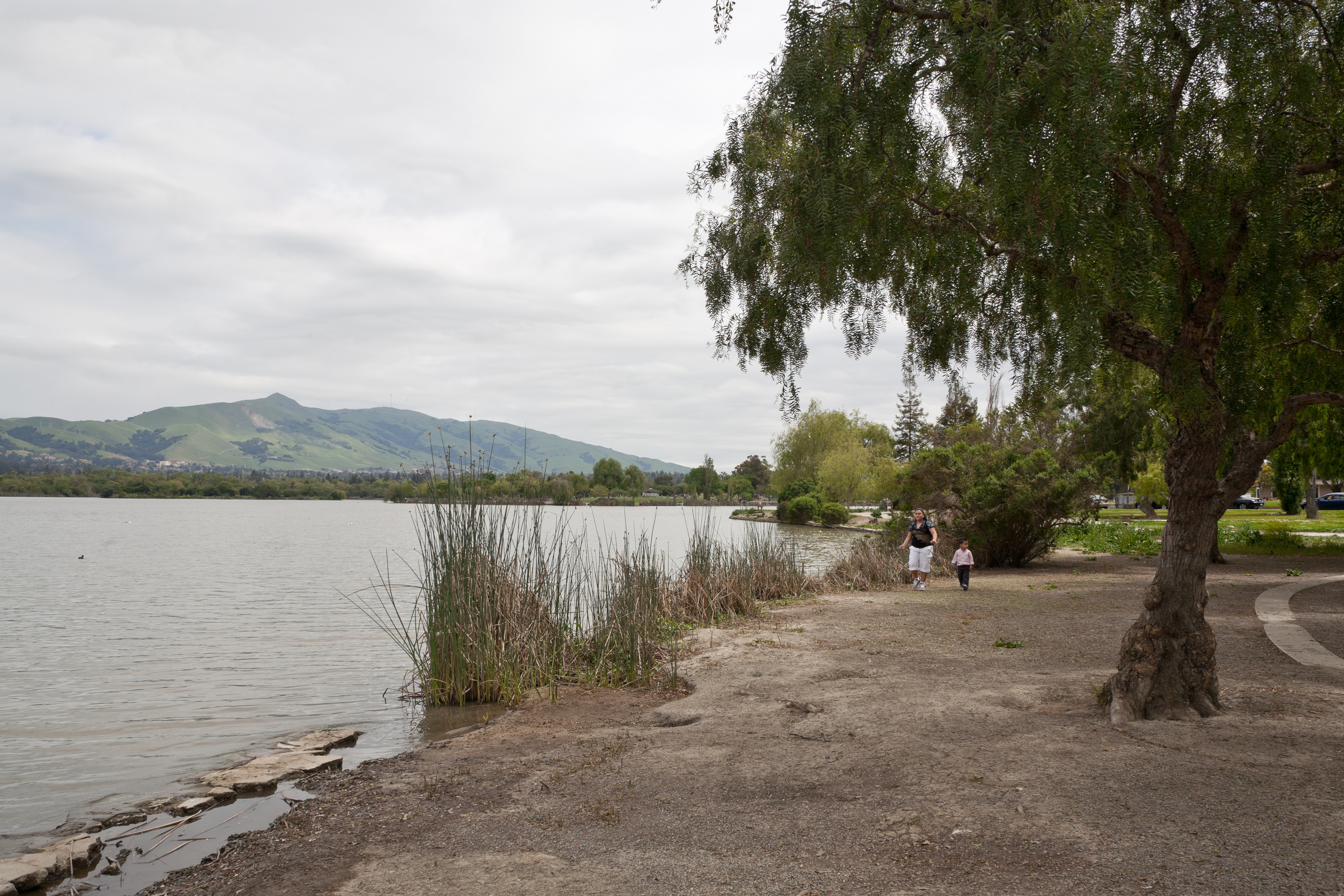
Fremont Central Park, with Lake Elizabeth at the left and the park at Mission Peak in the background.

Fremont Central Park is a 450-acre (180 ha) manmade park in the central area of Fremont, California on Paseo Padre Parkway at Stevenson Boulevard. It is accessible from I-880 and I-680. It began development in 1960, and contains Lake Elizabeth, a shallow 83-acre (34 ha) man made lake surrounded by picnic areas, sports fields, and walking and biking paths. The lake was dedicated to Fremont's sister city, Elizabeth, South Australia in 1969. A nine-hole golf course, driving range, and a path leading to Gomes Elementary is northeast of the park, while a skateboarding park and water slide swimming facility are southwest. The ecosystem and area around the park promotes diverse flora and fauna. Fremont Central Park is traversable on foot, and can be accessed by public roads. Much of the park was once the Stivers Lagoon and is part of the Laguna Creek Watershed.

== Background ==
A visitor center offers information on the several sites of Fremont and the East Bay. The park lies directly adjacent to the Hayward Fault Line, and is bordered by Stevenson Boulevard and Paseo Padre Parkway. Visitors are able to rent out boats for hourly use at varying rates. The park offers one person and two person Kayaks, paddle boats for up to four passengers, stand-up paddle boards and sailboats. Park guests are also permitted to bring their private boats for use on the lake for a $7 launch fee. The park often offers coupons for discounted boat rentals on their site.

=== BART tunnel ===
As part of the Warm Springs BART expansion, a 1.25 mi (2.01 km) cut-and-cover tunnel was built across the park and under Lake Elizabeth at a cost of $137 million. Underground tracks are more expensive than surface tracks, but this lessens the impact of train operations on the park. Construction began in 2009, and was completed in 2012. The tunnel did not open for revenue service until March 2017.

== Recreational Activities ==
Central Park provides nature, community, and recreation for its visitors. Some facilities in the area include the Fremont Golf Course, Fremont Skate Park, Fremont Main Library, Aqua Adventure Water Park, and Fremont Teen Center. The park also provides a kayak service, including paddle boats.

== Transportation ==
Most visitors drive or walk to the park, however parking lots overflow on busy weekends. Parking on the curb south of Stevenson and east of Paseo Padre Parkway is prohibited. The Fremont BART station is 1.5 miles (2.4 km) away from the park, and AC Transit provides bus service to the park.
